= Athletics at the 2002 Commonwealth Games – Women's 200 metres =

Women's 200 metres at the Commonwealth Games

The women's 200 metres event at the 2002 Commonwealth Games was held in Manchester City on 28–29 July 2002.

== Medalists ==
Gold	Silver	Bronze
Debbie Ferguson; Bahamas	Juliet Campbell; Jamaica	Lauren Hewitt; Australia

== Results ==
=== Heats ===
Qualification: First 3 of each heat (Q) and the next 4 fastest (q) qualified for the semifinals.

Wind:
Heat 1: +0.2 m/s, Heat 2: 0.0 m/s, Heat 3: +0.1 m/s, Heat 4: +0.4 m/s

Rank	Heat	Name	Nationality	Time	Notes
1	1	Juliet Campbell	Jamaica	22.87	Q
2	1	Joice Maduaka	England	23.00	Q, SB
3	1	Natasha Mayers	Saint Vincent and the Grenadines	23.02	Q
3	4	Beverly McDonald	Jamaica	23.02	Q
5	2	Debbie Ferguson	Bahamas	23.05	Q
6	3	Lauren Hewitt	Australia	23.13	Q
7	3	Cydonie Mothersille	Cayman Islands	23.14	Q
8	1	Sharon Cripps	Australia	23.36	q
9	4	Shani Anderson	England	23.38	Q
10	2	Astia Walker	Jamaica	23.48	Q
11	2	Lami Oyewumi	Canada	23.60	Q
12	3	Emily Freeman	England	23.64	Q
13	3	Damayanthi Darsha	Sri Lanka	23.69	q, SB
14	4	Winneth Dube	Zimbabwe	23.91	Q
15	4	Pauline Ibeagha	Nigeria	24.18	q
16	2	Makelesi Bulikiobo	Fiji	24.34	q, PB
17	1	Elisa Cossa	Mozambique	24.47	
18	1	Lineo Shoai	Lesotho	24.80	
19	1	Geraldine Elysee	Mauritius	24.86	PB
20	2	Pulane Sekonyana	Lesotho	25.85	
21	4	Aminata Kargbo	Sierra Leone	26.24	
22	3	Shyrone Hughes	Anguilla	26.33	
	3	Tennah Kargbo	Sierra Leone	DQ	
	4	Susanthika Jayasinghe	Sri Lanka	DQ	
	1	Myriam Léonie Mani	Cameroon	DNS	
	2	Tahesia Harrigan	British Virgin Islands	DNS	
	2	Tamsin Stephens	Northern Ireland	DNS	
	3	Yetunde Aikhena	Nigeria	DNS	
	3	Jenny Keni	Solomon Islands	DNS	
	4	Heather Samuel	Antigua and Barbuda	DNS	
	4	Emma Wade	Belize	DNS	

=== Semifinals ===
Qualification: First 4 of each heat qualified directly (Q) for the final.

Wind:
Heat 1: +0.2 m/s, Heat 2: –0.2 m/s

Rank	Heat	Name	Nationality	Time	Notes
1	1	Debbie Ferguson	Bahamas	22.67	Q
2	1	Beverly McDonald	Jamaica	23.01	Q
2	2	Juliet Campbell	Jamaica	23.01	Q
4	1	Cydonie Mothersille	Cayman Islands	23.07	Q
5	2	Natasha Mayers	Saint Vincent and the Grenadines	23.09	Q
6	2	Lauren Hewitt	Australia	23.21	Q
7	1	Sharon Cripps	Australia	23.24	Q
8	2	Joice Maduaka	England	23.25	Q
9	2	Astia Walker	Jamaica	23.31	
10	1	Lami Oyewumi	Canada	23.47	
11	1	Shani Anderson	England	23.60	
12	1	Emily Freeman	England	23.79	
13	1	Pauline Ibeagha	Nigeria	23.99	
14	2	Damayanthi Darsha	Sri Lanka	24.18	
15	2	Winneth Dube	Zimbabwe	24.44	
16	2	Makelesi Bulikiobo	Fiji	24.50	

=== Final ===
Wind: 0.0 m/s

Rank	Name	Nationality	Time	Notes
1st place, gold medalist(s)	Debbie Ferguson	Bahamas	22.20	GR
2nd place, silver medalist(s)	Juliet Campbell	Jamaica	22.54	SB
3rd place, bronze medalist(s)	Lauren Hewitt	Australia	22.69	SB
4	Natasha Mayers	Saint Vincent and the Grenadines	22.84	
5	Cydonie Mothersille	Cayman Islands	22.95	
6	Joice Maduaka	England	23.04	
7	Sharon Cripps	Australia	23.04	
	Beverly McDonald	Jamaica	DNS	
