= Athletics at the 2002 Commonwealth Games – Women's 4 × 100 metres relay =

Women's 4 × 100 metres relay at the Commonwealth Games

The women's 4 × 100 metres relay event at the 2002 Commonwealth Games was held on July 31.

== Results ==
Rank	Nation	Athletes	Time	Notes
1st place, gold medalist(s)	Bahamas	Tamicka Clarke, Sevatheda Fynes, Chandra Sturrup, Debbie Ferguson	42.44	GR
2nd place, silver medalist(s)	Jamaica	Elva Goulbourne, Juliet Campbell, Astia Walker, Veronica Campbell	42.73	
3rd place, bronze medalist(s)	England	Joice Maduaka, Shani Anderson, Vernicha James, Abiodun Oyepitan	42.84	
4	Australia	Melanie Kleeberg, Jodi Lambert, Sharon Cripps, Lauren Hewitt	43.72	
5	Nigeria	Patient Edem Emem, Uduak Ekah, Pauline Ibeagha, Chinedu Odozor	44.10	
6	Sri Lanka	Pradeepa Herath, Sriyani Kulawansa, Damayanthi Darsha, Susanthika Jayasinghe	44.25	
7	Fiji	Mereoni Raluve, Makelesi Bulikiobo, Vaciseva Tavaga, Vasiti Vatureba	47.02	
8	Sierra Leone	Fatmata Bash-Koroma, Ekundayo Williams, Tennah Kargbo, Aminata Kargbo	47.45	
