= 2004 IAAF World Indoor Championships – Women's 60 metres =

The Women's 60 metres event at the 2004 IAAF World Indoor Championships was held on March 5.

== Medalists ==
Gold	Silver	Bronze
Gail Devers; United States	Kim Gevaert; Belgium	Yulia Nestsiarenka; Belarus

== Results ==
=== Heat ===
First 4 of each heat (Q) and next 4 fastest (q) qualified for the semifinals.

Rank	Heat	Name	Nationality	Time	Notes
1	2	Christine Arron	France	7.15	Q
1	5	Gail Devers	United States	7.15	Q
3	4	Kim Gevaert	Belgium	7.16	Q
4	1	Yulia Nestsiarenka	Belarus	7.18	Q
4	3	Muriel Hurtis-Houairi	France	7.18	Q, SB
6	3	Debbie Ferguson-McKenzie	Bahamas	7.27	Q
6	5	Merlene Ottey	Slovenia	7.27	Q
8	2	Vida Anim	Ghana	7.28	Q
8	3	Yuliya Tabakova	Russia	7.28	Q
10	2	Yeoryia Kokloni	Greece	7.29	Q
10	4	Torri Edwards	United States	7.29	Q
12	2	Natasha Mayers	Saint Vincent and the Grenadines	7.30	Q, SB
13	1	Bettina Müller-Weissina	Austria	7.32	Q
13	5	Natallia Safronnikava	Belarus	7.32	Q
15	1	Brigitte Foster	Jamaica	7.33	Q, PB
16	1	Alenka Bikar	Slovenia	7.34	Q
17	1	Iryna Kozhemyakina	Ukraine	7.35	q
18	3	Joice Maduaka	Great Britain	7.37	Q
18	5	Enikő Szabó	Hungary	7.37	Q, PB
20	2	Manuela Levorato	Italy	7.38	q
20	4	Johanna Manninen	Finland	7.38	Q
22	4	Larisa Kruglova	Russia	7.39	Q
23	5	Agné Eggerth	Lithuania	7.42	q
24	4	Kadiatou Camara	Mali	7.43	q
25	5	Endurance Ojokolo	Nigeria	7.44	
26	1	Elvira Pančić	Serbia and Montenegro	7.47	
27	2	Carmen Blay	Spain	7.52	
28	1	Valma Bass	United States Virgin Islands	7.53	PB
29	4	Aksel Gürcan	Turkey	7.56	SB
30	4	Roxana Mercado	Puerto Rico	7.58	
31	3	Elena Bobrovskaya	Kyrgyzstan	7.64	
32	5	Antónia Margarete de Jesus	Angola	7.75	
33	3	Joanna Hoareau	Seychelles	8.18	
34	3	Carol Mokola	Zambia	8.20	NR
99	2	Robina Muqim Yaar	Afghanistan	DNS	
99	4	Michelle Banga Moundzoula	Republic of the Congo	DNS	
99	5	Heather Samuel	Antigua and Barbuda	DNS	

=== Semifinals ===
First 2 of each semifinal (Q) and next 2 fastest (q) qualified for the final.

Rank	Heat	Name	Nationality	Time	Notes
1	2	Kim Gevaert	Belgium	7.13	Q, NR
2	3	Christine Arron	France	7.14	Q
3	1	Gail Devers	United States	7.15	Q
4	1	Yuliya Tabakova	Russia	7.16	Q
4	2	Yulia Nestsiarenka	Belarus	7.16	Q
6	1	Muriel Hurtis-Houairi	France	7.18	q
6	3	Natallia Safronnikava	Belarus	7.18	Q
8	2	Torri Edwards	United States	7.21	q
8	3	Merlene Ottey	Slovenia	7.21	SB
10	2	Manuela Levorato	Italy	7.24	
11	1	Vida Anim	Ghana	7.25	
11	2	Natasha Mayers	Saint Vincent and the Grenadines	7.25	SB
13	2	Johanna Manninen	Finland	7.30	
14	1	Brigitte Foster	Jamaica	7.32	PB
14	3	Debbie Ferguson-McKenzie	Bahamas	7.32	
16	3	Yeoryia Kokloni	Greece	7.33	
17	1	Alenka Bikar	Slovenia	7.34	
18	3	Joice Maduaka	Great Britain	7.36	
19	2	Larisa Kruglova	Russia	7.37	
20	1	Iryna Kozhemyakina	Ukraine	7.40	
20	3	Enikő Szabó	Hungary	7.40	
22	1	Agné Eggerth	Lithuania	7.41	SB
23	2	Bettina Müller-Weissina	Austria	7.42	
24	3	Kadiatou Camara	Mali	7.47	

=== Final ===
Rank	Lane	Name	Nationality	Time	React	Notes
1st place, gold medalist(s)	4	Gail Devers	United States	7.08	0.144	SB
2nd place, silver medalist(s)	3	Kim Gevaert	Belgium	7.12	0.120	NR
3rd place, bronze medalist(s)	6	Yulia Nestsiarenka	Belarus	7.12	0.155	
4	2	Torri Edwards	United States	7.16	0.138	
5	1	Muriel Hurtis-Houairi	France	7.17	0.149	SB
6	7	Yuliya Tabakova	Russia	7.17	0.154	
7	5	Christine Arron	France	7.21	0.178	
8	8	Natallia Safronnikava	Belarus	7.23	0.162	
