= Athletics at the 1998 Commonwealth Games – Women's 100 metres =

Women's 100 metres at the Commonwealth Games

The women's 100 metres event at the 1998 Commonwealth Games was held on 16–17 September on National Stadium, Bukit Jalil.

== Medalists ==
Gold	Silver	Bronze
Chandra Sturrup; Bahamas	Philomena Mensah; Canada	Tania Van Heer; Australia

== Results ==
=== Heats ===
Qualification: First 3 of each heat (Q) and the next four fastest qualified for the semifinals.

Wind:
Heat 1: 0.0 m/s, Heat 2: 0.0 m/s, Heat 3: 0.0 m/s, Heat 4: -0.1 m/s

Rank	Heat	Name	Nationality	Time	Notes
1	3	Chandra Sturrup	Bahamas	11.14	Q
2	2	Philomena Mensah	Canada	11.20	Q
3	2	Joice Maduaka	England	11.32	Q
4	4	Vida Nsiah	Ghana	11.34	Q
5	2	Tania Van Heer	Australia	11.36	Q
6	2	Myriam Léonie Mani	Cameroon	11.38	q
7	4	Nova Maree Peris-Kneebone	Australia	11.42	Q
8	3	Lauren Hewitt	Australia	11.43	Q
9	4	Marcia Richardson	England	11.45	Q
10	4	Heather Samuel	Antigua and Barbuda	11.53	q
11	4	Govindasamy Shanti	Malaysia	11.58	q
12	1	Tamara Perry	Canada	11.59	Q
13	3	Martha Adusei	Canada	11.61	Q
14	1	Monica Twum	Ghana	11.62	Q
15	2	Malgorzata Rostek	Scotland	11.69	q
15	3	Sonia Williams	Antigua and Barbuda	11.69	q
17	1	Simmone Jacobs	England	11.74	Q
18	3	Anne-Marie Mouri	Cameroon	11.92	
19	3	Adi Waqanitoga	Fiji	12.15	
20	2	Marang Kinteh	Gambia	12.33	
21	1	Elisa Cossa	Mozambique	12.38	
22	3	Ekunddayo Williams	Sierra Leone	12.44	
23	1	Desiree Cocks	Anguilla	12.72	
24	4	Tricia Flores	Belize	13.23	
	1	Edwige Abena Fouda	Cameroon	DNS	

=== Semifinals ===
Qualification: First 4 of each heat qualified directly (Q) for the final.

Wind:
Heat 1: -0.6 m/s, Heat 2: -0.1 m/s

Rank	Heat	Name	Nationality	Time	Notes
1	1	Chandra Sturrup	Bahamas	11.22	Q
1	2	Philomena Mensah	Canada	11.22	Q
3	1	Tania Van Heer	Australia	11.35	Q, PB
4	2	Vida Nsiah	Ghana	11.39	Q
5	2	Nova Maree Peris-Kneebone	Australia	11.41	Q, PB
6	2	Lauren Hewitt	Australia	11.44	Q
7	1	Joice Maduaka	England	11.46	Q
8	2	Marcia Richardson	England	11.47	
9	1	Myriam Léonie Mani	Cameroon	11.53	Q
10	2	Govindasamy Shanti	Malaysia	11.58	
11	1	Tamara Perry	Canada	11.61	
12	2	Martha Adusei	Canada	11.68	
13	2	Heather Samuel	Antigua and Barbuda	11.69	
14	1	Simmone Jacobs	England	11.71	
15	1	Monica Twum	Ghana	11.72	
16	2	Sonia Williams	Antigua and Barbuda	11.82	
17	1	Malgorzata Rostek	Scotland	11.83	

=== Final ===
Wind: -0.3 m/s

Rank	Lane	Name	Nationality	Time	Notes
1st place, gold medalist(s)	5	Chandra Sturrup	Bahamas	11.06	
2nd place, silver medalist(s)	3	Philomena Mensah	Canada	11.19	
3rd place, bronze medalist(s)	4	Tania Van Heer	Australia	11.29	PB
4	8	Lauren Hewitt	Australia	11.37	
5	6	Vida Nsiah	Ghana	11.39	
6	1	Nova Maree Peris-Kneebone	Australia	11.41	
7	7	Joice Maduaka	England	11.50	
8	2	Myriam Léonie Mani	Cameroon	11.63	
