= 2001 World Championships in Athletics – Women's 100 metres =

These are the official results of the Women's 100 metres event at the 2001 IAAF World Championships in Edmonton, Canada.

== Medalists ==
Gold	Zhanna Pintusevich-Block; Ukraine (UKR)
Silver	Ekaterini Thanou; Greece (GRE)
Bronze	(The Bahamas) Chandra Sturrup; Bahamas (BAH)

== Results ==
=== Heats ===
First 3 of each Heat (Q) and the next 8 fastest (q) qualified for the quarterfinals.

Wind:
Heat 1: -0.9 m/s, Heat 2: +0.1 m/s, Heat 3: -0.5 m/s, Heat 4: -1.3 m/s, Heat 5: -0.6 m/s, Heat 6: -0.2 m/s, Heat 7: +0.6 m/s, Heat 8: -0.2 m/s

Rank	Heat	Name	Nationality	Time	Notes
	6	Marion Jones	United States	~~10.93~~	DQ
1	5	Ekaterini Thanou	Greece	11.12	Q
2	6	Endurance Ojokolo	Nigeria	11.13	Q, SB
3	3	Zhanna Pintusevich-Block	Ukraine	11.14	Q
4	2	Chandra Sturrup	Bahamas	11.26	Q
5	8	Mercy Nku	Nigeria	11.27	Q
6	6	Alenka Bikar	Slovenia	11.31	Q
7	7	Kim Gevaert	Belgium	11.35	Q
	1	Kelli White	United States	~~11.36~~	DQ
8	5	Astia Walker	Jamaica	11.36	Q
8	7	Chryste Gaines	United States	11.36	Q
10	4	Myriam Leonie Mani	Cameroon	11.37	Q
11	3	Gabi Rockmeier	Germany	11.38	Q
12	3	Mary Onyali-Omagbemi	Nigeria	11.39	Q
12	5	Marina Kislova	Russia	11.39	Q
12	8	Debbie Ferguson	Bahamas	11.39	Q
15	2	Frederique Bangue	France	11.41	Q
15	2	Angela Williams	United States	11.41	Q
15	7	Martha Adusei	Canada	11.41	Q, SB
18	6	Marion Wagner	Germany	11.43	q
19	1	Natalya Safronnikova	Belarus	11.44	Q
20	1	Natalya Ignatova	Russia	11.45	Q
20	8	Abiodun Oyepitan	Great Britain	11.45	Q
22	4	Manuela Levorato	Italy	11.46	Q
23	7	Katia Benth	France	11.47	q
	8	Venolyn Clarke	Canada	~~11.48~~	DQ
24	4	Johanna Manninen	Finland	11.49	Q
24	7	Liliana Allen	Mexico	11.49	q
26	4	Melanie Paschke	Germany	11.51	q
27	1	Natasha Mayers	Saint Vincent and the Grenadines	11.52	q
27	3	Marcia Richardson	Great Britain	11.52	q
29	2	Effrosini Patsou	Greece	11.53	q
30	2	Louise Ayetotche	Ivory Coast	11.53	
31	6	Shani Anderson	Great Britain	11.54	
32	1	Vida Nsiah	Ghana	11.56	SB
33	4	Dikeledi Moropane	South Africa	11.63	
34	5	Lyubov Perepelova	Uzbekistan	11.65	
35	8	Viktoriya Koviyreva	Kazakhstan	11.86	
36	5	Lerma Bulauitan	Philippines	11.87	
37	3	Peta-Gay Barrett	Jamaica	11.88	
38	8	Valma Bass	Saint Kitts and Nevis	11.89	
39	8	Kadiatou Camara	Mali	11.89	
40	2	Shamha Ahmed	Maldives	12.27	NR
41	1	Hermahayu	Indonesia	12.51	
42	7	Lai Choi Iok	Macau	12.74	
43	2	Aseel Danan	Jordan	12.77	
44	5	Shyrome Hughes	Anguilla	12.99	
45	7	Mari Paz Mosanga Motanga	Equatorial Guinea	13.04	
46	6	Marie-Jeanne Ceran-Jerusalemy	French Polynesia	13.31	
47	6	Ellysa William	Cook Islands	13.37	
48	3	Montserrat Pujol	Andorra	13.38	
49	5	Joanne Hallen	Samoa	13.40	
50	4	Peoria Koshiba	Palau	13.50	
51	8	Ana Pouhila	Tonga	13.57	
52	3	Twinsanne Sam	Federated States of Micronesia	13.87	
53	1	Detsalena Ollson	Nauru	14.04	
54	4	Priscilla Walenenea	Solomon Islands	14.43	

=== Quarterfinals ===
First 3 of each Heat (Q) and the next 4 fastest (q) qualified for the semifinals.

Wind:
Heat 1: 0.0 m/s, Heat 2: -3.4 m/s, Heat 3: +0.8 m/s, Heat 4: -1.3 m/s

Rank	Heat	Name	Nationality	Time	Notes
	1	Marion Jones	United States	~~10.97~~	DQ
1	4	Ekaterini Thanou	Greece	10.97	Q, SB
2	3	Chandra Sturrup	Bahamas	11.08	Q
	4	Kelli White	United States	~~11.11~~	DQ
3	1	Endurance Ojokolo	Nigeria	11.13	Q, SB
4	3	Mercy Nku	Nigeria	11.14	Q
5	1	Myriam Léonie Mani	Cameroon	11.15	Q
6	2	Zhanna Pintusevich-Block	Ukraine	11.16	Q
7	3	Angela Williams	United States	11.24	Q
8	1	Manuela Levorato	Italy	11.29	q
8	4	Mary Onyali-Omagbemi	Nigeria	11.29	Q
9	2	Chryste Gaines	United States	11.31	Q
9	3	Natasha Mayers	Saint Vincent and the Grenadines	11.31	q
10	1	Johanna Manninen	Finland	11.33	q, PB
10	3	Gabi Rockmeier	Germany	11.33	q
12	1	Alenka Bikar	Slovenia	11.34	
13	2	Debbie Ferguson	Bahamas	11.35	Q
13	3	Frederique Bangue	France	11.35	
17	4	Astia Walker	Jamaica	11.39	
18	4	Natalya Safronnikova	Belarus	11.40	
19	1	Marion Wagner	Germany	11.43	
19	3	Martha Adusei	Canada	11.43	
19	3	Liliana Allen	Mexico	11.43	
22	4	Natalya Ignatova	Russia	11.46	
23	4	Katia Benth	France	11.54	
24	2	Kim Gevaert	Belgium	11.56	
25	2	Marina Kislova	Russia	11.58	
26	4	Marcia Richardson	Great Britain	11.59	
27	2	Melanie Paschke	Germany	11.60	
28	2	Abiodun Oyepitan	Great Britain	11.61	
29	1	Effrosini Patsou	Greece	11.66	
	2	Venolyn Clarke	Canada	~~11.68~~	DQ

=== Semifinals ===
First 4 of each Semifinal qualified directly (Q) for the final.

Wind:
Heat 1: -2.3 m/s, Heat 2: +0.3 m/s

Rank	Heat	Name	Nationality	Time	Notes
1	1	Zhanna Pintusevich-Block	Ukraine	10.94	Q
	1	Marion Jones	United States	~~10.95~~	DQ
2	2	Ekaterini Thanou	Greece	11.05	Q
3	1	Debbie Ferguson	Bahamas	11.10	Q
4	1	Chryste Gaines	United States	11.12	Q
5	2	Chandra Sturrup	Bahamas	11.17	Q
	2	Kelli White	United States	~~11.19~~	DQ
6	1	Endurance Ojokolo	Nigeria	11.20	
7	1	Myriam Léonie Mani	Cameroon	11.26	
8	2	Mercy Nku	Nigeria	11.27	Q
9	2	Mary Onyali-Omagbemi	Nigeria	11.29	
10	2	Angela Williams	United States	11.31	
11	2	Natasha Mayers	Saint Vincent and the Grenadines	11.35	
12	2	Johanna Manninen	Finland	11.46	
13	1	Gabi Rockmeier	Germany	11.48	
14	1	Manuela Levorato	Italy	11.50	

=== Final ===
Wind: -0.3 m/s

Rank	Lane	Name	Nationality	React	Time	Notes
1st place, gold medalist(s)	4	Zhanna Pintusevich-Block	Ukraine	0.123	10.82	WL
	3	Marion Jones	United States	0.146	~~10.85~~	DQ
2nd place, silver medalist(s)	5	Ekaterini Thanou	Greece	0.145	10.91	SB
3rd place, bronze medalist(s)	6	Chandra Sturrup	Bahamas	0.154	11.02	
4	1	Chryste Gaines	United States	0.141	11.06	
5	8	Debbie Ferguson	Bahamas	0.189	11.13	
	7	Kelli White	United States	0.151	~~11.15~~	DQ
6	2	Mercy Nku	Nigeria	0.142	11.17	
