= Athletics at the 2002 Commonwealth Games – Women's 100 metres =

Women's 100 metres at the Commonwealth Games

The women's 100 metres event at the 2002 Commonwealth Games was held on 26–27 July.

== Medalists ==
| Gold | Silver | Bronze |
|---|---|---|
| Debbie Ferguson; Bahamas | Veronica Campbell; Jamaica | Sevatheda Fynes; Bahamas |

== Results ==
=== Heats ===
Qualification: First 3 of each heat (Q) and the next 4 fastest (q) qualified for the semifinals.

Wind:
Heat 1: –0.5 m/s, Heat 2: +0.5 m/s, Heat 3: –0.3 m/s, Heat 4: –1.1 m/s

| Rank | Heat | Name | Nationality | Time | Notes |
|---|---|---|---|---|---|
| 1 | 4 | Debbie Ferguson | Bahamas | 11.23 | Q |
| 2 | 3 | Susanthika Jayasinghe | Sri Lanka | 11.27 | Q |
| 3 | 2 | Sevatheda Fynes | Bahamas | 11.30 | Q |
| 4 | 1 | Veronica Campbell | Jamaica | 11.32 | Q |
| 5 | 3 | Natasha Mayers | Saint Vincent and the Grenadines | 11.35 | Q |
| 6 | 3 | Abiodun Oyepitan | England | 11.37 | Q, SB |
| 7 | 2 | Fana Ashby | Trinidad and Tobago | 11.42 | Q, PB |
| 8 | 1 | Amanda Forrester | England | 11.44 | Q, SB |
| 9 | 2 | Shani Anderson | England | 11.50 | Q |
| 10 | 1 | Lauren Hewitt | Australia | 11.51 | Q |
| 11 | 4 | Uduak Ekah | Nigeria | 11.56 | Q |
| 12 | 1 | Heather Samuel | Antigua and Barbuda | 11.62 | q |
| 13 | 3 | Pauline Ibeagha | Nigeria | 11.63 | q |
| 14 | 1 | Tahesia Harrigan | British Virgin Islands | 11.71 | q |
| 15 | 1 | Winneth Dube | Zimbabwe | 11.72 | q, NR |
| 15 | 3 | Tamicka Clarke | Bahamas | 11.72 | |
| 17 | 4 | Peta Barrett | Jamaica | 11.75 | Q |
| 18 | 4 | Makelesi Bulikiobo | Fiji | 12.01 | |
| 19 | 4 | Elisa Cossa | Mozambique | 12.07 | |
| 20 | 2 | Emma Wade | Belize | 12.19 | |
| 21 | 4 | Vida Anim | Ghana | 12.27 | |
| 22 | 1 | Ekundayo Williams | Sierra Leone | 12.36 | |
| 23 | 2 | Aminata Kargbo | Sierra Leone | 12.48 | |
| 24 | 1 | Vaciseva Tavaga | Fiji | 12.72 | |
| 25 | 3 | Tennah Kargbo | Sierra Leone | 12.86 | |
| 26 | 4 | Desiree Cocks | Anguilla | 12.88 | |
| 27 | 3 | Jenny Keni | Solomon Islands | 13.02 | |
| 28 | 2 | Kaitinano Mwemweata | Kiribati | 13.58 | NR |
| | 2 | Mercy Nku | Nigeria | DNS | |
| | 4 | Myriam Léonie Mani | Cameroon | DNS | |

=== Semifinals ===
Qualification: First 4 of each heat qualified directly (Q) for the final.

Wind:
Heat 1: +0.3 m/s, Heat 2: +0.8 m/s

| Rank | Heat | Name | Nationality | Time | Notes |
|---|---|---|---|---|---|
| 1 | 1 | Debbie Ferguson | Bahamas | 11.08 | Q, SB |
| 2 | 2 | Sevatheda Fynes | Bahamas | 11.13 | Q, SB |
| 3 | 2 | Susanthika Jayasinghe | Sri Lanka | 11.15 | Q |
| 4 | 1 | Veronica Campbell | Jamaica | 11.21 | Q |
| 5 | 1 | Natasha Mayers | Saint Vincent and the Grenadines | 11.22 | Q |
| 6 | 1 | Abiodun Oyepitan | England | 11.36 | Q, SB |
| 7 | 2 | Amanda Forrester | England | 11.37 | Q, PB |
| 8 | 2 | Shani Anderson | England | 11.39 | Q |
| 9 | 2 | Lauren Hewitt | Australia | 11.45 | |
| 10 | 2 | Fana Ashby | Trinidad and Tobago | 11.46 | |
| 11 | 2 | Pauline Ibeagha | Nigeria | 11.51 | |
| 12 | 1 | Uduak Ekah | Nigeria | 11.54 | |
| 13 | 1 | Heather Samuel | Antigua and Barbuda | 11.56 | |
| 14 | 2 | Peta Barrett | Jamaica | 11.60 | |
| 15 | 1 | Tahesia Harrigan | British Virgin Islands | 11.62 | |
| 16 | 1 | Winneth Dube | Zimbabwe | 11.65 | NR |

=== Final ===
Wind: +1.5 m/s

| Rank | Name | Nationality | Time | Notes |
|---|---|---|---|---|
| 1st place, gold medalist(s) | Debbie Ferguson | Bahamas | 10.91 | GR |
| 2nd place, silver medalist(s) | Veronica Campbell | Jamaica | 11.00 | PB |
| 3rd place, bronze medalist(s) | Sevatheda Fynes | Bahamas | 11.07 | SB |
| 4 | Susanthika Jayasinghe | Sri Lanka | 11.08 | SB |
| 5 | Amanda Forrester | England | 11.34 | PB |
| 6 | Shani Anderson | England | 11.36 | SB |
| 7 | Abiodun Oyepitan | England | 11.37 | |
| 8 | Natasha Mayers | Saint Vincent and the Grenadines | 11.38 | |
