= Athletics at the 1998 Commonwealth Games – Women's 4 × 100 metres relay =

Women's 4 × 100 metres relay at the Commonwealth Games

The women's 4 × 100 metres relay event at the 1998 Commonwealth Games was held on 21 September on National Stadium, Bukit Jalil.

== Results ==
Rank	Nation	Athletes	Time	Notes
1st place, gold medalist(s)	Australia	Tania Van Heer, Lauren Hewitt, Nova Maree Peris-Kneebone, Sharon Cripps	43.39	
2nd place, silver medalist(s)	Jamaica	Donnette Brown, Juliet Campbell, Gillian Russell, Brigitte Foster	43.49	
3rd place, bronze medalist(s)	England	Marcia Richardson, Donna Fraser, Simmone Jacobs, Joice Maduaka	43.69	
4	Ghana	Mavis Akoto, Monica Twum, Veronica Bawuah, Vida Nsiah	43.81	SB
5	Canada	Keturah Anderson, Tamara Perry, Philomena Mensah, Martha Adusei	44.23	
6	Cameroon	Anne-Marie Mouri, Mireille Nguimgo, Claudine Komgang, Myriam Léonie Mani	45.26	
