= Athletics at the 1999 Pan American Games – Women's 200 metres =

Women's 200 metres at the Pan American Games

The women's 200 metres event at the 1999 Pan American Games was held July 27–28.

== Medalists ==
Gold	Silver	Bronze
Debbie Ferguson; Bahamas	Lucimar de Moura; Brazil	Felipa Palacios; Colombia

== Results ==
=== Heats ===
Qualification: First 3 of each heat (Q) and the next 2 fastest (q) qualified for the final.

Wind:
Heat 1: +1.3 m/s, Heat 2: +0.7 m/s

Rank	Heat	Name	Nationality	Time	Notes
1	2	Debbie Ferguson	Bahamas	22.94	Q
2	1	Felipa Palacios	Colombia	23.11	Q
3	2	Cydonie Mothersille	Cayman Islands	23.14	Q
4	1	Lucimar de Moura	Brazil	23.20	Q
5	1	Pauline Davis-Thompson	Bahamas	23.22	Q
6	1	Beverly Grant	Jamaica	23.50	q
7	2	Heather Samuel	Antigua and Barbuda	23.81	Q
8	2	Tara Perry	Canada	23.82	q
9	1	Tanya Oxley	Barbados	23.90	
10	1	Chandra Burns	United States	23.96	
11	2	Patricia Rodríguez	Colombia	24.33	
12	2	Marcela Sarabia	Mexico	24.39	
	2	Juliet Campbell	Jamaica	DNS	

=== Final ===
Wind: -1.3 m/s

Rank	Name	Nationality	Time	Notes
1st place, gold medalist(s)	Debbie Ferguson	Bahamas	22.83	
2nd place, silver medalist(s)	Lucimar de Moura	Brazil	23.03	
3rd place, bronze medalist(s)	Felipa Palacios	Colombia	23.05	
4	Pauline Davis-Thompson	Bahamas	23.07	
5	Cydonie Mothersille	Cayman Islands	23.40	
6	Beverly Grant	Jamaica	23.75	
7	Heather Samuel	Antigua and Barbuda	23.88	
8	Tara Perry	Canada	23.99	
