= 2003 World Championships in Athletics – Women's 100 metres =

These are the official results of the Women's 100 metres event at the 2003 IAAF World Championships in Paris, France. There were a total number of 59 participating athletes, with eight qualifying heats, four quarter-finals, two semi-finals and the final held on Sunday 24 August 2003 at 19:45h.

== Heats ==
Held on Saturday 23 August 2003

RANK	HEAT 1	TIME
1.	Chandra Sturrup (BAH)	11.08
2.	Lyubov Perepelova (UZB)	11.30
3.	Vida Anim (GHA)	11.35
4.	Mercy Nku (NGR)	11.52
5.	Kadiatou Camara (MLI)	11.70
6.	Olympia Zacharias (NRU)	14.07
7.	Joanne Hallen (SAM)	14.33

RANK	HEAT 2	TIME
1.	Torri Edwards (USA)	11.13
2.	Geraldine Pillay (RSA)	11.40
3.	Endurance Ojokolo (NGR)	11.50
4.	Winneth Dube (ZIM)	11.71
5.	Shams-Un-Nahar Chumky (BAN)	12.27
6.	Yahanatou Ibrahim (NIG)	12.97
7.	Temreta Martin (KIR)	14.42

RANK	HEAT 3	TIME
1.	Merlene Ottey (SLO)	11.26
2.	Kim Gevaert (BEL)	11.30
3.	Savatheda Fynes (BAH)	11.49
4.	Grace Dinkins (LBR)	11.90
5.	Irma Navarrete (NCA)	12.93
6.	Lima Azimi (AFG)	18.37
—	Kelli White (USA)	DQ

RANK	HEAT 4	TIME
1.	Susanthika Jayasinghe (SRI)	11.20
2.	Mary Onyali-Omagbemi (NGR)	11.50
3.	Lerma Gabito (PHI)	11.99
4.	Mariam Inashvili (GEO)	12.64
5.	Svetlana Pessova (TKM)	13.05
6.	Tricia Flores (BIZ)	13.89
—	Liliana Allen (MEX)	DNS
—	Zhanna Block (UKR)	DQ

RANK	HEAT 5	TIME
1.	Marina Kislova (RUS)	11.26
2.	Joice Maduaka (GBR)	11.31
3.	Agné Eggerth (LTU)	11.44
4.	Natasha Mayers (VIN)	11.81
5.	Nadesca Sprockel (AHO)	12.61
6.	Jenny Keni (SOL)	12.64
7.	Marie-Jeanne Binga (GAB)	12.88
8.	Vladislava Ovcharenko (TJK)	13.34

RANK	HEAT 6	TIME
1.	Ekaterini Thanou (GRE)	11.09
2.	Yuliya Tabakova (RUS)	11.24
3.	Olena Pastushenko-Sinyavina (UKR)	11.30
4.	Debbie Ferguson-McKenzie (BAH)	11.32
5.	Heather Samuel (ATG)	12.24
6.	Ngerak Florencio (PLW)	12.85
7.	Liovalia Lopes (GBS)	13.43

RANK	HEAT 7	TIME
1.	Christine Arron (FRA)	11.15
2.	Gail Devers (USA)	11.17
3.	Judyth Kitson (JAM)	11.70
4.	Makaridja Sanganoko (CIV)	11.79
5.	Saira Fazal (PAK)	12.75
6.	Rima Taha (JOR)	13.00
7.	Aminata Kamissoko (MTN)	13.70

RANK	HEAT 8	TIME
1.	Aleen Bailey (JAM)	11.23
2.	Karin Mayr-Krifka (AUT)	11.31
3.	Guzel Khubbieva (UZB)	11.35
4.	Virgen Benavides (CUB)	11.41
5.	Kin Yee Wan (HKG)	12.27
6.	Mari Paz Mosanga Motanga (GEQ)	12.73
7.	Chandra Kala Thapa (NEP)	13.02
8.	Susan Tama (VAN)	13.45

== Quarter-finals ==
- Held on Saturday 23 August 2003

RANK	HEAT 1	TIME
1.	Chandra Sturrup (BAH)	10.98
2.	Gail Devers (USA)	11.16
3.	Kim Gevaert (BEL)	11.23
4.	Marina Kislova (RUS)	11.26
5.	Virgen Benavides (CUB)	11.40
6.	Geraldine Pillay (RSA)	11.47
7.	Judyth Kitson (JAM)	11.61
—	Natasha Mayers (VIN)	DNS

RANK	HEAT 2	TIME
1.	Christine Arron (FRA)	11.08
2.	Merlene Ottey (SLO)	11.31
3.	Lyubov Perepelova (UZB)	11.35
4.	Agné Eggerth (LTU)	11.36
5.	Endurance Ojokolo (NGR)	11.55
6.	Winneth Dube (ZIM)	11.69
7.	Kadiatou Camara (MLI)	11.73
—	Zhanna Block (UKR)	DQ

RANK	HEAT 3	TIME
1.	Ekaterini Thanou (GRE)	11.11
2.	Debbie Ferguson-McKenzie (BAH)	11.26
3.	Mary Onyali-Omagbemi (NGR)	11.31
4.	Karin Mayr-Krifka (AUT)	11.34
5.	Olena Pastushenko-Sinyavina (UKR)	11.36
—	Kelli White (USA)	DQ
—	Susanthika Jayasinghe (SRI)	DNF
—	Makaridja Sanganoko (CIV)	DNS

RANK	HEAT 4	TIME
1.	Torri Edwards (USA)	11.08
2.	Aleen Bailey (JAM)	11.16
3.	Yuliya Tabakova (RUS)	11.25
4.	Joice Maduaka (GBR)	11.29
5.	Vida Anim (GHA)	11.29
6.	Savatheda Fynes (BAH)	11.36
7.	Mercy Nku (NGR)	11.37
8.	Guzel Khubbieva (UZB)	11.42

== Semi-final ==
- Held on Sunday 24 August 2003

RANK	HEAT 1	TIME
1.	Christine Arron (FRA)	11.01
2.	Aleen Bailey (JAM)	11.15
3.	Marina Kislova (RUS)	11.15
4.	Merlene Ottey (SLO)	11.26
5.	Kim Gevaert (BEL)	11.32
—	Kelli White (USA)	DQ
—	Zhanna Block (UKR)	DQ
—	Lyubov Perepelova (UZB)	DNS

RANK	HEAT 2	TIME
1.	Chandra Sturrup (BAH)	11.06
2.	Ekaterini Thanou (GRE)	11.08
3.	Torri Edwards (USA)	11.11
4.	Gail Devers (USA)	11.12
5.	Debbie Ferguson-McKenzie (BAH)	11.27
6.	Mary Onyali-Omagbemi (NGR)	11.35
7.	Yuliya Tabakova (RUS)	11.36
8.	Joice Maduaka (GBR)	11.40

== Final ==
RANK	FINAL	TIME
	Torri Edwards (USA)	10.93
	Chandra Sturrup (BAH)	11.02
	Ekaterini Thanou (GRE)	11.03
4.	Christine Arron (FRA)	11.06
5.	Aleen Bailey (JAM)	11.07
6.	Gail Devers (USA)	11.11
—	Kelli White (USA)	DQ
—	Zhanna Block (UKR)	DQ

Kelli White crossed the finish line in first place in a time of 10.85 seconds, and Zhanna Block finished third in 10.99 seconds. However, both were later disqualified for anti-doping violations.
