= Sharon Cripps =

Australian sprinter

Medal record

Women's athletics

Representing Australia

Commonwealth Games
Gold medal – first place	1998 Kuala Lumpur	4 × 100 m relay

Sharon Lee Cripps (born 29 June 1977 in Brisbane, Queensland) is a former track and field sprinter from Australia. She attended Ferny Grove State High School in Brisbane.

== Athletics career ==
Cripps represented Australia in two Summer Olympics (1996 and 2000) and two Commonwealth Games (1998 and 2002), as well as the 2003 World Championships.

At the 1996 Olympics, as a 19-year-old, she made the final of the women's 4 x 100 metres relay, finishing seventh. She was part of the Australian team that won the gold medal in the women's 4 × 100 metres relay at the 1998 Commonwealth Games along with Tania Van Heer, Lauren Hewitt and Nova Peris-Kneebone in a time of 43.39 seconds. At the 2002 Commonwealth Games she made the final of both the 200 metres and 4 × 100 metres relay, finishing seventh and fourth respectively. In 2003, she was Australia's national champion in the women's 100 and 200 metres.

=== Personal bests ===
Event	Time	Place	Date
100 m	11.38	Darwin, Australia	22 June 2002
200 m	22.84	Adelaide, Australia	6 February 2003
