= Athletics at the 2010 Commonwealth Games – Women's 200 metres =

Women's 200 metres at the Commonwealth Games

The Women's 200 metres at the 2010 Commonwealth Games as part of the athletics programme was held at the Jawaharlal Nehru Stadium on and Sunday 10 October and Monday 11 October 2010.

== Records ==
World Record	21.34	(United States) Florence Griffith-Joyner	United States	Seoul, South Korea	29 September 1988
Games Record	22.19	(Jamaica) Merlene Ottey	JAM	Brisbane, Australia	1982

== Round 1 ==
First 4 in each heat (Q) and 4 best performers (q) advance to the Semifinals.

=== Heat 1 ===
Rank	Lane	Name	Reaction Time	Result	Notes
1	8	Eleni Artymata (CYP)	0.273	23.23	Q
2	2	Abiodun Oyepitan (ENG)	0.174	23.86	Q
3	6	Justine Bayigga (UGA)	0.268	24.35	Q
4	3	Fanny Shonobi (GAM)	0.159	25.36	Q, PB
–	5	Elizabeth Amolofo (GHA)			DNS
–	7	Dee-Ann Rogers (AIA)			DNS
–	4	Tameka Williams (SKN)			DNS

=== Heat 2 ===
Rank	Lane	Name	Reaction Time	Result	Notes
1	6	Toea Wisil (PNG)	0.181	23.65	Q
2	3	Lee McConnell (SCO)	0.352	23.78	Q
3	7	Sathi Geetha (IND)	0.191	23.99	Q, SB
4	8	Laura Turner (ENG)	0.294	23.99	Q
5	4	Nadia Cunningham (JAM)	0.248	24.76	q
6	2	Leticia Macauley (SLE)	0.184	25.36	PB
7	5	Saruba Colley (GAM)		25.52	

=== Heat 3 ===
Rank	Lane	Name	Reaction Time	Result	Notes
1	7	Joice Maduaka (ENG)	0.200	23.75	Q
2	6	Audria Segree (JAM)	0.226	23.91	Q
3	8	Amy Foster (NIR)	0.186	24.19	Q, SB
4	2	Alison George (GRN)	0.200	24.78	Q
5	4	Kaina Martinez (BIZ)	0.229	25.65	
6	3	Mirfath Mirfath (MDV)	0.282	26.87	PB
–	5	Blessing Okagbare (NGR)			DNS

=== Heat 4 ===
Rank	Lane	Name	Reaction Time	Result	Notes
1	2	Cydonie Mothersill (CAY)	0.237	23.30	Q
2	8	Bertille Atangana (CMR)	0.173	23.83	Q
3	6	Hiriyur Jyothi (IND)	0.198	24.25	Q
4	7	Sefakor Anipah (GHA)	0.305	24.76	Q
5	4	Michaela Kargbo (SLE)	0.207	25.12	q
–	5	Endurance Abinuwa (NGR)			DNS
–	3	Elisa Cossa (MOZ)			DNS

=== Heat 5 ===
Rank	Lane	Name	Reaction Time	Result	Notes
1	9	Monique Williams (NZL)	0.254	23.61	Q, SB
2	2	Adrienne Power (CAN)	0.200	23.67	Q
3	7	Elaine O´Neill (WAL)	0.196	23.83	Q, =SB
4	6	Oludamola Osayomi (NGR)	0.191	23.93	Q
5	3	Janet Amponsah (GHA)	0.224	24.46	q, PB
6	5	Mary Vincent (MRI)	0.250	24.76	q
7	4	Rebecca Ansumana (SLE)	0.178	25.18	
8	8	Susan Tengatenga (MAW)	0.247	25.36	SB

== Semifinals ==
First 2 in each heat (Q) and 2 best performers (q) advance to the Final.

=== Semifinal 1 ===
Rank	Lane	Name	Reaction Time	Result	Notes
1	9	Lee McConnell (SCO)	0.219	23.56	Q, SB
2	2	Adrienne Power (CAN)	0.178	23.59	Q
3	7	Alison George (GRN)	0.186	24.38	
4	6	Sefakor Anipah (GHA)	0.305	25.08	
5	3	Michaela Kargbo (SLE)	0.212	25.33	
–	5	Eleni Artymata (CYP)	F^{1}		DSQ
–	4	Sathi Geetha (IND)	F^{1}		DSQ
–	8	Laura Turner (ENG)			DNS

=== Semifinal 2 ===
Rank	Lane	Name	Reaction Time	Result	Notes
1	6	Abiodun Oyepitan (ENG)	0.168	23.33	Q, SB
2	4	Monique Williams (NZL)	0.228	23.63	Q
3	7	Toea Wisil (PNG)	0.177	23.68	q
4	9	Oludamola Osayomi (NGR)	0.227	23.95	
5	5	Audria Segree (JAM)	0.215	24.38	
6	8	Justine Bayigga (UGA)	0.196	24.39	
7	3	Janet Amponsah (GHA)	0.201	24.44	PB
8	2	Mary Vincent (MRI)	0.229	25.04	

=== Semifinal 3 ===
Rank	Lane	Name	Reaction Time	Result	Notes
1	5	Cydonie Mothersill (CAY)	0.270	23.20	Q
2	4	Joice Maduaka (ENG)	0.177	23.56	Q
3	7	Elaine O´Neill (WAL)	0.170	23.77	q, SB
4	6	Bertille Atangana (CMR)	0.171	23.78	
5	9	Amy Foster (NIR)	0.196	23.83	SB
6	8	Hiriyur Jyothi (IND)	0.243	24.52	
7	2	Nadia Cunningham (JAM)	0.329	24.85	
8	3	Fanny Shonobi (GAM)	0.149	25.11	PB

== Final ==
Rank	Lane	Name	Reaction Time	Result	Notes
1st place, gold medalist(s)	6	Cydonie Mothersill (CAY)	0.267	22.89	
2nd place, silver medalist(s)	4	Abiodun Oyepitan (ENG)	0.155	23.26	SB
3rd place, bronze medalist(s)	8	Adrienne Power (CAN)	0.195	23.52	
4	5	Joice Maduaka (ENG)	0.169	23.57	
5	7	Lee McConnell (SCO)	0.255	23.68	
6	9	Monique Williams (NZL)	0.231	23.71	
7	3	Toea Wisil (PNG)	0.169	23.84	
8	2	Elaine O´Neill (WAL)	0.162	23.88	
