= Tania Van Heer =

Australian former sprinter (born 1970)

Personal information
- Born: 30 December 1970 (age 55) Colombo, Sri Lanka

Sport
- Country: Australia
- Sport: Track and field
- Events: Sprints, relays

Achievements and titles
- Personal bests: 100 m: 11.29 (Kuala Lumpur 1998); 200 m: 22.42 (Canberra 1999); 400 m: 51.28 (Melbourne 1999)
Medal record
Women's athletics
Representing Australia
Commonwealth Games
Gold medal – first place	Kuala Lumpur 1998	4 × 100 m relay
Gold medal – first place	Kuala Lumpur 1998	4 × 400 m relay
Bronze medal – third place	Kuala Lumpur 1998	100 m
World Indoor Championships
Silver medal – second place	Maebashi 1999	4 × 400 m relay

Tania Van Heer (born 30 December 1970) is an Australian former sprinter who competed in the 100 metres, 200 metres, 400 metres and relay events. A two-time Commonwealth Games champion, she won gold in both the 4 × 100 metres and 4 × 400 metres relays and bronze in the 100 metres at the 1998 Commonwealth Games.

== Early life ==
Van Heer was born in Colombo, Sri Lanka. Her family left Sri Lanka amid political tensions and settled in Adelaide, South Australia, in the mid-1980s.

== Career ==
=== 1987–1993 ===
Van Heer won the under-18 100 metres, 200 metres and 400 metres at the 1987 Australian Junior Championships. The following year, she won all three events at under-20 level, before retaining the 200 m and 400 m titles in 1989. Van Heer also represented Oceania in the 4 × 400 metres relay at the 1989 and 1992 IAAF World Cups, finishing sixth on both occasions. In 1993, she reached the senior Australian podium in both short sprints, placing third in the 100 metres and 200 metres at the national championships in Brisbane.

=== 1998–1999 ===
Coached by Alastair Gordon during this period, Van Heer finished second in the 100 metres at the Australian trials for the 1998 Commonwealth Games in Sydney, running 11.84 seconds behind Lauren Hewitt and ahead of Nova Peris. Peris subsequently challenged Van Heer's selection, but the appeal was unsuccessful. In September, Van Heer represented Oceania at the 1998 IAAF World Cup in Johannesburg, finishing seventh in the 200 metres and sixth in both relays. Later that month, at the Commonwealth Games in Kuala Lumpur, she won bronze in the 100 metres in a personal-best 11.29 seconds (−0.3 m/s), before leading off Australia's gold medal-winning 4 × 100 metres relay team alongside Hewitt, Peris and Sharon Cripps. She added a second gold in the 4 × 400 metres relay with Lee Naylor, Tamsyn Lewis and Susan Andrews.

Van Heer opened 1999 by setting a personal best of 22.42 seconds (+2.0 m/s) for the 200 metres in Canberra in February. At the World Indoor Championships in Maebashi the following month, she combined with Andrews, Lewis and Cathy Freeman to win silver in the 4 × 400 metres relay, with their time of 3:26.87 setting Australian and Oceanian indoor records. Later in March, she ran a personal best of 51.28 seconds while finishing second behind Freeman in the 400 metres at the Australian Championships in Melbourne.

At the 1999 World Championships in Athletics in Seville, Van Heer won her opening 200 metres heat in 22.67 seconds and progressed through the quarter-finals before finishing fifth in her semi-final in 22.57 seconds, one place short of the final. She also ran the opening leg of Australia's 4 × 400 metres relay team with Naylor, Andrews and Freeman, which finished sixth in the final in 3:28.04.

=== 2000–2006 ===
Van Heer withdrew from the 2000 Australian Championships in February with a virus. In August, she was omitted from Australia's team for the 2000 Summer Olympics in Sydney despite having achieved the Olympic qualifying standards in the 100 metres, 200 metres and 400 metres.

After several years away from top-level competition, Van Heer returned to athletics with the aim of competing at the 2006 Commonwealth Games in Melbourne. At the 2006 Australian Championships, she finished fourth in the 100 metres in 11.83 seconds and fifth in the 200 metres in 23.90 seconds. She was subsequently included in Australia's 4 × 100 metres relay squad for the Commonwealth Games, but did not compete.

== Personal life ==
Van Heer is the mother of Australian sprinter Aidan Murphy.

== Personal bests ==
Event	Mark	Wind (m/s)	Location	Date	Notes
100 metres	11.29	(−0.3 m/s)	Kuala Lumpur, Malaysia	17 September 1998	South Australian record
200 metres	22.42	(+2.0 m/s)	Canberra, Australia	6 February 1999	South Australian record
400 metres	51.28	—N/a	Melbourne, Australia	19 March 1999	South Australian record
4 × 100 m	43.39	—N/a	Kuala Lumpur, Malaysia	21 September 1998	
4 × 400 m (short track)	3:26.87	—N/a	Maebashi, Japan	7 March 1999	NR, AR
