= 1994 World Junior Championships in Athletics – Women's 200 metres =

The women's 200 metres event at the 1994 World Junior Championships in Athletics was held in Lisbon, Portugal, at Estádio Universitário de Lisboa on 22 and 23 July.

== Medalists ==
Gold	Heide Seÿerling; South Africa
Silver	Lakeisha Backus; United States
Bronze	Tatyana Tkalich; Ukraine

== Results ==
=== Final ===
23 July
Wind: +2.2 m/s

Rank	Name	Nationality	Time	Notes
1st place, gold medalist(s)	Heide Seÿerling	South Africa	22.80 w	
2nd place, silver medalist(s)	Lakeisha Backus	United States	22.86 w	
3rd place, bronze medalist(s)	Tatyana Tkalich	Ukraine	23.35 w	
4	Debbie Ferguson	Bahamas	23.59 w	
5	Sylviane Félix	France	23.61 w	
6	Fabé Dia	France	23.67 w	
7	Huang Mei	China	24.11 w	
	Astia Walker	Jamaica	DQ	

=== Semifinals ===
23 July

==== Semifinal 1 ====
Wind: +0.2 m/s

Rank	Name	Nationality	Time	Notes
1	Heide Seÿerling	South Africa	23.36	Q
2	Lakeisha Backus	United States	23.51	Q
3	Sylviane Félix	France	23.90	Q
4	Huang Mei	China	24.15	Q
5	Melissa Straker	Barbados	24.36	
6	Tonique Williams	Bahamas	24.45	
7	Tatyana Kotelnikova	Uzbekistan	24.51	
8	Susan Williams	United Kingdom	24.72	

==== Semifinal 2 ====
Wind: +1.0 m/s

Rank	Name	Nationality	Time	Notes
1	Astia Walker	Jamaica	23.46	Q
2	Tatyana Tkalich	Ukraine	23.63	Q
3	Debbie Ferguson	Bahamas	23.84	Q
4	Fabé Dia	France	23.84	Q
5	Karen Boone	United States	24.03	
6	Štepánka Klapácová	Czech Republic	24.14	
7	Bindee Goon Chew	Australia	24.57	
8	Militza Castro	Puerto Rico	24.62	

=== Quarterfinals ===
22 July

==== Quarterfinal 1 ====
Wind: +2.1 m/s

Rank	Name	Nationality	Time	Notes
1	Lakeisha Backus	United States	23.74 w	Q
2	Huang Mei	China	24.00 w	Q
3	Tonique Williams	Bahamas	24.11 w	Q
4	Melissa Straker	Barbados	24.28 w	Q
5	Janette Wise	New Zealand	24.67 w	
6	Cathy Rejouis	Canada	24.84 w	
	Nora Ivanova	Bulgaria	DQ	
	Cydonie Mothersill	Cayman Islands	DNS	

==== Quarterfinal 2 ====
Wind: -0.4 m/s

Rank	Name	Nationality	Time	Notes
1	Heide Seÿerling	South Africa	23.51	Q
2	Sylviane Félix	France	23.75	Q
3	Militza Castro	Puerto Rico	24.23	Q
4	Bindee Goon Chew	Australia	24.38	Q
5	Radana Volná	Czech Republic	24.43	
6	Agnė Visockaitė	Lithuania	24.45	
7	Fabiana Cosolo	Italy	24.63	
8	Monica Marin	Spain	24.74	

==== Quarterfinal 3 ====
Wind: +0.8 m/s

Rank	Name	Nationality	Time	Notes
1	Astia Walker	Jamaica	23.55	Q
2	Štepánka Klapácová	Czech Republic	23.98	Q
3	Karen Boone	United States	24.25	Q
4	Tatyana Kotelnikova	Uzbekistan	24.28	Q
5	Esmari Le Roux	South Africa	24.63	
6	Elona Reinalda	Australia	24.69	
7	Natalya Drozdova	Russia	24.73	
8	Karen Shinkins	Ireland	25.20	

==== Quarterfinal 4 ====
Wind: +0.4 m/s

Rank	Name	Nationality	Time	Notes
1	Debbie Ferguson	Bahamas	23.67	Q
2	Tatyana Tkalich	Ukraine	23.77	Q
3	Fabé Dia	France	24.35	Q
4	Susan Williams	United Kingdom	24.45	Q
5	Valentina Cuccia	Italy	24.55	
6	Olga Kotlyarova	Russia	24.58	
7	Jane Arnott	New Zealand	24.68	
8	Marion Wagner	Germany	24.70	

=== Heats ===
22 July

==== Heat 1 ====
Wind: +1.0 m/s

Rank	Name	Nationality	Time	Notes
1	Heide Seÿerling	South Africa	23.86	Q
2	Bindee Goon Chew	Australia	24.58	Q
3	Karen Boone	United States	24.60	Q
4	Jane Arnott	New Zealand	24.68	Q
5	Mercy Nku	Nigeria	24.97	
6	Marie Westerlund	Sweden	25.12	
7	Bina Shrestha	Nepal	28.45	

==== Heat 2 ====
Wind: +1.5 m/s

Rank	Name	Nationality	Time	Notes
1	Debbie Ferguson	Bahamas	23.77	Q
2	Huang Mei	China	24.43	Q
3	Karen Shinkins	Ireland	24.57	Q
4	Cathy Rejouis	Canada	24.65	Q
5	Monica Marin	Spain	24.66	q
6	Olga Kotlyarova	Russia	24.68	q
7	Daniele Janzen	Brazil	24.95	
8	Kaltouma Nadjina	Chad	24.99	

==== Heat 3 ====
Wind: +1.0 m/s

Rank	Name	Nationality	Time	Notes
1	Nora Ivanova	Bulgaria	24.14	Q
2	Tatyana Kotelnikova	Uzbekistan	24.21	Q
3	Militza Castro	Puerto Rico	24.52	Q
4	Marion Wagner	Germany	24.64	Q
5	Cydonie Mothersill	Cayman Islands	24.65	q
6	Sunna Gestsdóttir	Iceland	25.24	
	Sinead Dudgeon	United Kingdom	DQ	

==== Heat 4 ====
Wind: +0.2 m/s

Rank	Name	Nationality	Time	Notes
1	Sylviane Félix	France	23.82	Q
2	Štepánka Klapácová	Czech Republic	24.11	Q
3	Agnė Visockaitė	Lithuania	24.28	Q
4	Tonique Williams	Bahamas	24.43	Q
5	Esmari Le Roux	South Africa	24.52	q
6	Elona Reinalda	Australia	24.79	q
7	Mame Twumasi	Canada	24.87	
8	Verica Dimitrovska	North Macedonia	26.32	

==== Heat 5 ====
Wind: +0.2 m/s

Rank	Name	Nationality	Time	Notes
1	Lakeisha Backus	United States	23.77	Q
2	Fabé Dia	France	24.24	Q
3	Valentina Cuccia	Italy	24.43	Q
4	Susan Williams	United Kingdom	24.51	Q
5	Natalya Drozdova	Russia	24.56	q
6	Radana Volná	Czech Republic	24.61	q

==== Heat 6 ====
Wind: +0.9 m/s

Rank	Name	Nationality	Time	Notes
1	Astia Walker	Jamaica	23.49	Q
2	Tatyana Tkalich	Ukraine	23.77	Q
3	Melissa Straker	Barbados	24.39	Q
4	Fabiana Cosolo	Italy	24.57	Q
5	Janette Wise	New Zealand	24.59	q
6	Onica Fraser	Guyana	25.04	

== Participation ==
According to an unofficial count, 42 athletes from 31 countries participated in the event.

- Australia (2)
- Bahamas (2)
- Barbados (1)
- Brazil (1)
- Bulgaria (1)
- Canada (2)
- Cayman Islands (1)
- Chad (1)
- China (1)
- Czech Republic (2)
- France (2)
- Germany (1)
- Guyana (1)
- Iceland (1)
- Ireland (1)
- Italy (2)
- Jamaica (1)
- Lithuania (1)
- North Macedonia (1)
- Nepal (1)
- New Zealand (2)
- Nigeria (1)
- Puerto Rico (1)
- Russia (2)
- South Africa (2)
- Spain (1)
- Sweden (1)
- Ukraine (1)
- United Kingdom (2)
- United States (2)
- Uzbekistan (1)
