= 2004 African Championships in Athletics – Women's 200 metres =

The women's 200 metres event at the 2004 African Championships in Athletics was held in Brazzaville, Republic of the Congo on July 16–18.

== Medalists ==
Gold	Silver	Bronze
Geraldine Pillay; South Africa	Kadiatou Camara; Mali	Kaltouma Nadjina; Chad

== Results ==
=== Heats ===
Wind:
Heat 1: -0.5 m/s, Heat 2: -0.3 m/s, Heat 3: +0.2 m/s, Heat 4: +0.9 m/s

Rank	Heat	Name	Nationality	Time	Notes
1	1	Kaltouma Nadjina	Chad	23.63	Q
2	1	Pauline Ibeagha	Nigeria	24.24	Q
3	1	Charlotte Mebenga	Cameroon	25.26	Q
4	1	Gladys Thomson	Liberia	27.40	
1	2	Delphine Atangana	Cameroon	23.68	Q
2	2	Winneth Dube	Zimbabwe	23.99	Q
3	2	Kadiatou Camara	Mali	24.45	Q
4	2	Assetou Bamba	Ivory Coast	24.63	q
5	2	Carol Mokola	Zambia	26.02	
1	3	Aminata Diouf	Senegal	23.48	Q
2	3	Amandine Allou Affoue	Ivory Coast	23.69	Q
3	3	Michelle Banga Moundzoula	Republic of the Congo	24.94	Q
4	3	Sidi Gbadamassi Bayo	Benin	25.17	q
5	3	Mariama Soumah	Guinea	26.03	
1	4	Aïda Diop	Senegal	23.49	Q
2	4	Geraldine Pillay	South Africa	23.61	Q
3	4	Justine Bayigga	Uganda	24.81	Q
4	4	Mercy Tabiri	Ghana	24.84	q
5	4	Gifty Addy	Ghana	25.20	q
6	4	Melanie Atsio-Gouamali	Republic of the Congo	25.80	
7	4	Fortune Omar	Somalia	29.38	

=== Semifinals ===
Wind:
Heat 1: +0.4 m/s, Heat 2: -1.1 m/s

Rank	Heat	Name	Nationality	Time	Notes
1	2	Kaltouma Nadjina	Chad	23.18	Q
2	1	Kadiatou Camara	Mali	23.21	Q, NR
3	1	Geraldine Pillay	South Africa	23.27	Q
4	2	Aïda Diop	Senegal	23.31	Q
5	1	Aminata Diouf	Senegal	23.34	Q
6	1	Delphine Atangana	Cameroon	23.58	Q
7	2	Amandine Allou Affoue	Ivory Coast	23.59	Q
8	2	Winneth Dube	Zimbabwe	24.00	Q
9	1	Pauline Ibeagha	Nigeria	24.04	
10	1	Assetou Bamba	Ivory Coast	24.58	
11	2	Justine Bayigga	Uganda	24.65	
12	2	Gifty Addy	Ghana	24.69	
13	1	Sidi Gbadamassi Bayo	Benin	24.87	
14	2	Michelle Banga Moundzoula	Republic of the Congo	25.01	
15	1	Mercy Tabiri	Ghana	25.18	
16	2	Charlotte Mebenga	Cameroon	25.47	

=== Final ===
Wind: -1.2 m/s

Rank	Name	Nationality	Time	Notes
1st place, gold medalist(s)	Geraldine Pillay	South Africa	23.18	
2nd place, silver medalist(s)	Kadiatou Camara	Mali	23.22	
3rd place, bronze medalist(s)	Kaltouma Nadjina	Chad	23.29	
4	Aïda Diop	Senegal	23.58	
5	Amandine Allou Affoue	Ivory Coast	23.74	
6	Winneth Dube	Zimbabwe	24.02	
	Delphine Atangana	Cameroon	DNF	
	Aminata Diouf	Senegal	DNS	
