= Astia Walker =

Jamaican athlete

Astia Walker-Eastwood (born 4 April 1975 in Trelawny Parish) is a retired Jamaican athlete who competed mostly in the sprinting and hurdling events. She represented her country in the 200 metres at the 2000 Summer Olympics reaching the second round. Most of her successes came in the 4 × 100 metres relay. Walker-Eastwood ran track collegiately Riverside Community College and Louisiana State University. She was inducted into the Riverside Community College Sports Hall of Fame in 2015.

== Competition record ==
Year	Competition	Venue	Position	Event	Notes
Representing Jamaica
1993	CARIFTA Games (U20)	Fort-de-France, Martinique	2nd	200 m	23.65
1993	CARIFTA Games (U20)	Fort-de-France, Martinique	–	100 m H	DQ
1994	Central American and Caribbean Junior Championships (U20)	Port of Spain, Trinidad and Tobago	1st	200 m	23.5
1994	Central American and Caribbean Junior Championships (U20)	Port of Spain, Trinidad and Tobago	1st	100 m H	13.5
1994	World Junior Championships	Lisbon, Portugal	2nd (sf)	200 m	23.46 (wind: +1.0 m/s)
1994	World Junior Championships	Lisbon, Portugal	4th (sf)	100 m H	13.37 (wind: +1.0 m/s)
1994	World Junior Championships	Lisbon, Portugal	1st	4 × 100 m	44.01
1997	World Championships	Athens, Greece	12th (sf)	100 m H	13.00
2000	Olympic Games	Sydney, Australia	27th (h)	200 m	23.33
2001	Central American and Caribbean Championships	Guatemala City, Guatemala	1st	4 × 100 m	43.83 A
2001	Central American and Caribbean Championships	Guatemala City, Guatemala	2nd	100 m	11.41
2001	Central American and Caribbean Championships	Guatemala City, Guatemala	2nd	100 m H	13.32
2001	World Championships	Edmonton, Canada	17th (qf)	100 m	11.39
2001	World Championships	Edmonton, Canada	3rd	4 × 100 m	42.40
2001	Goodwill Games	Brisbane, Australia	3rd	4 × 100 m	43.13
2002	Commonwealth Games	Manchester, United Kingdom	9th (sf)	200 m	23.31
2002	Commonwealth Games	Manchester, United Kingdom	2nd	4 × 100 m	42.73

== Personal bests ==
Outdoor

- 100 metres – 11.28 (+0.2 m/s) (Kingston 2001)
- 200 metres – 22.79 (+0.7 m/s) (Linz 2000)
- 100 metres hurdles – 12.82 (+0.8 m/s) (Leverkusen 2000)

Indoor

- 60 metres – 7.41 (Baton Rouge 1999)
- 200 metres – 23.15 (Baton Rouge 1998)
- 60 metres hurdles – 8.07 (Chemnitz 2003)
