= Marine Ghazaryan =

Armenian sprinter

Marine Ghazaryan (Armenian: Մարինէ Ղազարյան, born November 28, 1985, in Armenian SSR) is an Armenian sprinter. She competed at the 2004 Summer Olympics in the women's 100 metres. Ghazaryan's best 100 meter timing is 11.8, achieved in 2003.
