= Winneth Dube =

Zimbabwean sprinter

Winneth Dube (born 10 May 1972) is a Zimbabwean retired athlete specialising in the sprinting events. She competed in the 100 metres at the 2004 Olympic Games without reaching the second round.

== Competition record ==
Year	Competition	Venue	Position	Event	Notes
Representing Zimbabwe
2002	Commonwealth Games	Manchester, United Kingdom	16th (sf)	100 m	11.65
2002	Commonwealth Games	Manchester, United Kingdom	15th (sf)	200 m	24.44
2002	African Championships	Radès, Tunisia	5th	200 m	23.72
2003	World Championships	Paris, France	27th (qf)	100 m	11.69
2003	All-Africa Games	Abuja, Nigeria	8th	100 m	11.62
2003	All-Africa Games	Abuja, Nigeria	10th (sf)	200 m	23.79
2004	African Championships	Brazzaville, Republic of the Congo	7th	100 m	11.73
2004	African Championships	Brazzaville, Republic of the Congo	6th	200 m	24.02
2004	Olympic Games	Athens, Greece	39th (h)	100 m	11.56

== Personal bests ==
Outdoor

- 100 metres – 11.36 (+1.2 m/s) (Durban 2003) NR
- 200 metres – 23.23 (0.0 m/s) (Pretoria 2003) NR
- 400 metres – 54.86 (Calgary 2009)

Indoor

- 60 metres – 7.52 (Calgary 2008, 2010) NR
- 200 metres – 24.81 (Winnipeg 2005) NR
