= Natasha Mayers =

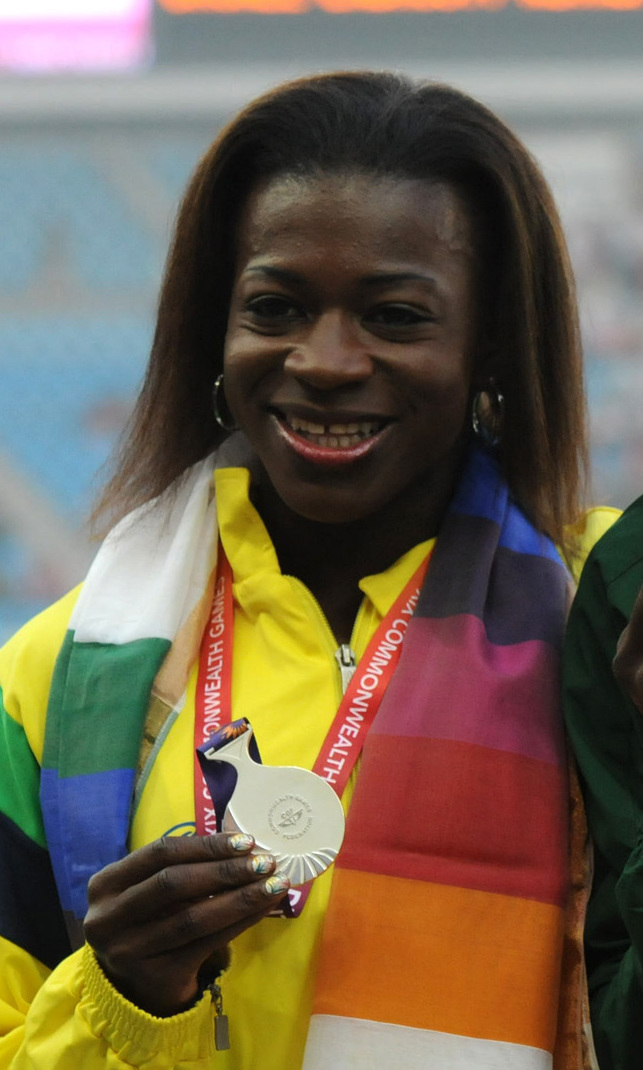

Personal information
- Born: 10 March 1979 (age 47)

Sport
- Country: Saint Vincent and the Grenadines
- Sport: Track and field
- Events: 60 metres, 100 metres, 200 metres
Medal record
Commonwealth Games
Representing Saint Vincent and the Grenadines
| Gold medal – first place | 2010 New Delhi | 100 m |

Natasha Laren Mayers (born 10 March 1979 in Saint Vincent) is a professional track and field sprinter who competes internationally for Saint Vincent and the Grenadines. She is the national record holder over 60 metres, 100 metres, and 200 metres. She represented her country at the Summer Olympic Games in 2000 and 2004 and had the honour of being the national flag bearer at the latter edition. She has also appeared at the IAAF World Championships in Athletics in 2001 and 2003, as well as taking part in the IAAF World Indoor Championships.

She won the 2002 NCAA women's 200 m title, running for the USC Trojans. Mayers received a two-year competitive ban from athletics after testing positive for excess testosterone in July 2005. She returned to international competition in 2010 and won the 100 m gold medal at the 2010 Commonwealth Games – An initial bronze medallist, she was twice upgraded as both of the other two original medallists were disqualified.

== Career ==
=== Early career ===
She was educated in the United States, attending Inglewood High School in California, before moving on to Los Angeles Southwest College. She made her Olympic debut at the 2000 Sydney Olympics and was just one of four competitors selected for the national Olympic team that year. Her next global appearances came at the 2001 World Championships in Athletics and she entered both the 100 metres and 200 metres competitions. Although she was eliminated in the heats of the latter event, she managed to reach the semi-finals of the 100 m and placed sixth in her heat.

Mayers gained a place at University of Southern California and began competing for the USC Trojans women's track team. She was cleared to race in May 2002 after initial eligibility issues and ran in the 100 m and 200 m at that year's NCAA Outdoor Women's Track and Field Championship. Her Trojan's teammate Angela Williams won in the 100 m and Mayers finished one hundredth of a second behind her for second place. She had a personal record run of 22.80 seconds in the 200 m qualifiers, the third fastest ever time for a USC athlete, and then went on to secure the 200 m NCAA title in the final. Later that year, she ran a 100 m best of 11.09 seconds at the Mt. SAC Relays. She represented her country at the 2002 Commonwealth Games and reached the finals of both the short sprints. She was eighth in the 100 m but was fourth over 200 m, missing the medals by a margin of 0.15 seconds.

=== Olympic flag bearer and doping ban ===
At the 2003 IAAF World Indoor Championships, she ran in the 60 metres and just missed out on a spot in the final, finishing third in her semi-final. She equalled her personal best of 11.09 seconds at the Mt. SAC Relays but did not get past the heats in her race at the 2003 World Championships in the outdoor season. She reached the 60 m semi-finals at the 2004 IAAF World Indoor Championships and again ran over 100 m at the major outdoor championship – her second Olympic performance at the 2004 Athens Games came to an abrupt end after she suffered a hamstring injury after reaching the quarter-finals stage. She was the Olympic national flag bearer at the Games opening ceremony and was chosen at the St. Vincent Sports Personality of the Year for her achievements later that year.

She returned to St. Vincent in early 2005 and, while there, gave talks at local schools, promoting hard work and encouraging children to avoid the dangers of illegal drugs. In June of that year, she tested positive for excess testosterone against her epitestosterone levels, and the IAAF gave her a two-year ban from the sport, stretching from June 2005 to June 2007. Later, reflecting on the ban, she said: "I just didn't know what to do. I went about it all wrong. I should have sought some help...I accepted the ban and that's that." She made her competitive return at the Athens Grand Prix Tsiklitiria, where she was runner-up in the 100 m behind Brianna Glenn.

=== 2010 Commonwealth champion ===
After a break from the sport, she returned a few years and won the gold medal in the women's 100 m final at the 2010 Commonwealth Games in New Delhi. The eventual medalists bore little relation to the finishing positions at the end of the race. After a dual false start by Laura Turner and Sally Pearson, Turner was disqualified but Pearson was allowed to run. Pearson finished first, followed by Nigeria's Oludamola Osayomi and then Mayers. Pearson was then disqualified on appeal, and Mayers was elevated to the silver medal. Osayomi was disqualified later after failing a drug test, leaving Mayers as the event winner. This made her the first woman to win at the Commonwealth Games for Saint Vincent and Grenadines, the country's only medallist at the Games, and only their second gold medallist ever after Frankie Lucas's middleweight title at the 1974 edition.

She competed sparingly after her Commonwealth Games win. She ran at the 2011 Central American and Caribbean Championships but did not start in the final. She was a non-starter at the 2011 World Championships in Athletics. Her fastest run in 2012 was 11.50 seconds for the 100 m and in 2013, she slowed further to 11.80 seconds. With the 2014 Commonwealth Games forthcoming, she raised awareness that she lacked the funds to return to defend her title. She received a grant from the Prime Minister in 2011 but criticised the lack of support from her sporting federation otherwise.

== Personal bests ==
- 60 metres – 7.18A (2002) NR
- 100 metres – 11.09 (2002) NR
- 200 metres – 22.80 (2002) NR
- 400 metres – 54.34 (2003)

== International competition record ==
| Year | Competition | Venue | Position | Event | Notes |
|---|---|---|---|---|---|
| 2000 | Olympic Games | Sydney, Australia | 40th (heats) | 100 metres | |
| 2001 | World Championships | Edmonton, Canada | 11th | 100 metres | 11.35 |
| 2001 | World Championships | Edmonton, Canada | 30th (heats) | 200 metres | 24.91 |
| 2002 | Commonwealth Games | Manchester, England | 8th | 100 metres | 11.38 |
| 2002 | Commonwealth Games | Manchester, England | 4th | 200 metres | 22.84 |
| 2003 | World Indoor Championships | Birmingham, United Kingdom | 9th (semis) | 60 metres | 7.23 |
| 2003 | World Championships | Paris, France | DNS (q-finals) | 100 metres | — |
| 2004 | Olympic Games | Athens, Greece | DNS (q-finals) | 100 metres | — |
| 2004 | World Indoor Championships | Budapest, Hungary | 11th (semis) | 60 metres | 7.25 |
| 2010 | Commonwealth Games | New Delhi, India | 1st | 100 metres | 11.37 |
| 2011 | Central American and Caribbean Championships | Mayagüez, Puerto Rico | DNS (final) | 100 metres | — |
| 2011 | World Championships | Daegu, South Korea | DNS (heats) | 100 metres | — |

== See also ==
- List of doping cases in athletics

Olympic Games
| Preceded by Pamenos Ballantyne | Flagbearer for Saint Vincent and the Grenadines; Athens 2004 | Succeeded by Kineke Alexander |
