= Kadiatou Camara =

Malian sprinter (born 1981)

Medal record

Women's athletics

Representing Mali

African Championships
| Silver medal – second place | 2004 Brazzaville | 200 m |
| Silver medal – second place | 2004 Brazzaville | Long jump |
| Silver medal – second place | 2008 Addis Ababa | 200 m |

Kadiatou Camara (born 4 May 1981 in Ségou) is a retired Malian sprinter who specialized in the 200 metres. She formerly competed in the long jump.

== Competition record ==
| Year | Competition | Venue | Position | Event | Notes |
Representing Mali
| 1998 | World Junior Championships | Annecy, France | 41st (h) | 200m | 25.88 (wind: -0.2 m/s) |
| 1999 | All-Africa Games | Johannesburg, South Africa | 16th (sf) | 100 m | 11.99 |
| 1999 | All-Africa Games | Johannesburg, South Africa | 11th | Long jump | 5.90 m |
| 2000 | Olympic Games | Sydney, Australia | 46th (h) | 100 m | 11.65 |
| 2000 | World Junior Championships | Santiago, Chile | 20th (qf) | 100m | 11.93 (wind: +0.3 m/s) |
| 2001 | Jeux de la Francophonie | Ottawa, Canada | 11th (sf) | 100 m | 11.87 |
| 2001 | Jeux de la Francophonie | Ottawa, Canada | 10th (h) | 200 m | 24.05 |
| 2001 | World Championships | Edmonton, Canada | 38th (h) | 100 m | 11.89 |
| 2002 | African Championships | Radès, Tunisia | 12th (h) | 100 m | 11.86 |
| 2002 | African Championships | Radès, Tunisia | 7th | Long jump | 5.71 m |
| 2003 | World Indoor Championships | Birmingham, United Kingdom | 27th (h) | 60 m | 7.42 |
| 2003 | World Championships | Paris, France | 28th (qf) | 100 m | 11.73 |
| 2003 | All-Africa Games | Abuja, Nigeria | 10th (sf) | 100 m | 11.67 |
| 2003 | All-Africa Games | Abuja, Nigeria | 5th | Long jump | 6.18 m |
| 2003 | Afro-Asian Games | Hyderabad, India | 4th | Long jump | 6.30 m |
| 2004 | World Indoor Championships | Budapest, Hungary | 24th (sf) | 60 m | 7.47 |
| 2004 | African Championships | Brazzaville, Congo | 7th (sf) | 100 m | 11.57 |
| 2004 | African Championships | Brazzaville, Congo | 2nd | 200 m | 23.22 |
| 2004 | African Championships | Brazzaville, Congo | 2nd | Long jump | 6.29 m |
| 2004 | Olympic Games | Athens, Greece | 36th (h) | 200 m | 23.56 |
| 2006 | African Championships | Bambous, Mauritius | 6th | 100 m | 12.10 |
| 2006 | African Championships | Bambous, Mauritius | 4th | 200 m | 23.47 |
| 2007 | World Championships | Osaka, Japan | 32nd (h) | 200 m | 23.48 |
| 2008 | African Championships | Addis Ababa, Ethiopia | 2nd | 200 m | 22.70 |
| 2008 | Olympic Games | Beijing, China | 17th (qf) | 200 m | 23.06 |
| 2009 | Jeux de la Francophonie | Beirut, Lebanon | 2nd | 100 m | 11.73 (w) |
| 2009 | Jeux de la Francophonie | Beirut, Lebanon | 4th | 200 m | 23.88 |

=== Personal bests ===
- 60 metres – 7.35 s (2003, indoor)
- 100 metres – 11.48 s (2005)
- 200 metres – 22.70 s (2008)
- Long jump – 6.53 m (2003)
- Triple jump – 12.90 m (2004)

Olympic Games
| Preceded by Brahima Guindo | Flagbearer for Mali; 2004 Athens | Succeeded by Daba Modibo Keita |
