= Pauline Ibeagha =

Nigerian sprinter

Medal record

Women's athletics

Representing Nigeria

African Championships
Silver medal – second place	2002 Radès	4×400 m

Pauline Ibeagha (born 13 May 1978) is a retired Nigerian sprinter.

Her career peaking in 2002, she competed at the 2002 Commonwealth Games, reaching the semi-final of the 100 and 200 metres and finishing fifth in the 4 × 100 metres relay. At the 2002 African Championships the Nigerian team did not finish the 4 × 100 metres relay, but won silver in the 4 × 400 metres relay. Ibeagha later reached the 200 metres semi-final at the 2004 African Championships.

Her personal best times were 11.38 seconds in the 100 metres, achieved in March 2002 in Enugu; and 23.99 seconds in the 200 metres, achieved at the 2002 Commonwealth Games in Manchester.
