= Martha Adusei =

Ghanaian-Canadian sprinter (born 1976)

Personal information
- Nationality: Ghanaian, Canadian
- Born: 8 June 1976 (age 49) Kumasi, Ghana
- Height: 1.65 m (5 ft 5 in)

Sport
- Country: CANADA
- Sport: Sprinting
- Event: 100 metres

Martha Adusei (born 8 June 1976) is a Ghanaian-Canadian sprinter.

Born in Kumasi, she originally represented Ghana, including at the 1994 Commonwealth Games.

She competed in her first Canadian Championships in 1997, winning the bronze medal in the 100 metre dash. In individual international competitions, she competed in the 100 metres at the Athletics at the 1998 Commonwealth Games, the 1999 World Championships, the 2000 Olympic Games and the 2001 World Championships without reaching the final.

In the 4 × 100 metres relay with the Canadian national team, she finished fifth at the 1998 Commonwealth Games, sixth at the 1999 World Championships and won a gold medal at the 2001 Jeux de la Francophonie. She also competed at the 2000 Olympic Games and the 2001 World Championships without reaching the final. Shortly before the 2001 World Championships, one of the relay team members Venolyn Clarke was ousted for a doping violation.

Her personal best time was 11.29 seconds, first achieved in July 1998 in Flagstaff and then equalled in June 2000 in Helsinki. She recorded 7.27 seconds in the 60 metres in February 2001 in Halle.
