= Athletics at the 2004 Summer Olympics – Women's 100 metres =

Women's 100 metres at the Games of the XXVIII Olympiad
- Olympic Athletics
- Venue: Athens Olympic Stadium
- Date: 20–21 August
- Competitors: 63 from 56 nations
- Winning time: 10.93 s

Medalists
1st place, gold medalist(s)		Yulia Nestsiarenka	Belarus
2nd place, silver medalist(s)		Lauryn Williams	United States
3rd place, bronze medalist(s)		Veronica Campbell	Jamaica

The women's 100 metres at the 2004 Summer Olympics as part of the athletics program were held at the Athens Olympic Stadium from August 20 to 21.

In the first round, the first three runners from each of the eight heats, together with the eight next fastest overall runners (8×3+8=32), automatically qualified for the second round. In the second round, these thirty-two runners competed in four heats, with the first three from each heat and the four next fastest overall (4×3+4=16) advancing to the semifinals. In the semifinals, only the first four runners from each of the two heats move on to the final (2×4=8).

With some of the world's most promising sprinters, including 2000 Olympic champion Marion Jones and home favorite Ekaterini Thanou, absent, the race had become widely open in the final. The start was notably uneven as Bulgaria's Ivet Lalova and Jamaica's Sherone Simpson jumped into upright running positions quickly from the blocks, while Simpson's Jamaican teammates Aleen Bailey and Veronica Campbell and American favorite Lauryn Williams got out behind. Campbell further seemed to stumble while Williams powerfully overstride from last into the lead in the middle of the track by the halfway mark. Simpson faded quickly from her fast start being overtaken by Belarusian sprinter Yulia Nestsiarenka, who attempted to find her stride with just 30 metres into the race on the outside. While Williams and Campbell found their stride to maintain a commanding lead towards the 60-metre mark, Nestsiarenka held off a late charge to continue her march past the field and produce a storming finish with a Belarusian record of 10.93 seconds, making her the nation's first Olympic champion in this event. Following an unexpected victory from Nestsiarenka, Williams edged the fast closing Campbell for a silver medal by a hundredth of a second, finishing at 10.96.

== Records ==
Prior to the competition, the existing World record, Olympic record, and world leading time were as follows:

World record	Florence Griffith-Joyner (USA)	10.49 s	Indianapolis, United States	16 July 1988
Olympic record	Florence Griffith-Joyner (USA)	10.62 s	Seoul, South Korea	24 September 1988
World Leading	Ivet Lalova-Collio (BUL)	10.77	Plovdiv, Bulgaria	19 June 2004

No new records were set during the competition.

== Qualification ==
The qualification period for Athletics was 1 January 2003 to 9 August 2004. For the women's 200 metres, each National Olympic Committee was permitted to enter up to three athletes that had run the race in 11.30 seconds or faster during the qualification period. If an NOC had no athletes that qualified under that standard, one athlete that had run the race in 11.40 seconds or faster could be entered.

== Schedule ==
All times are Eastern European Summer Time (UTC+3)

Date	Time	Round
Friday, 20 August 2004	10:50; 20:10	Round 1 Quarterfinals
Saturday, 21 August 2004	20:20; 22:55	Semifinals; Final

== Results ==
=== Round 1 ===
Qualification rule: The first three finishers in each heat (Q) plus the next eight fastest overall runners (q) qualified for the next round.

==== Heat 1 ====
Wind: +0.5 m/s

Rank	Lane	Athlete	Nation	Reaction	Time	Notes
1	2	Aleen Bailey	Jamaica	0.232	11.20	Q
2	3	Véronique Mang	France	0.186	11.24	Q, PB
3	8	Debbie Ferguson	Bahamas	0.189	11.30	Q
4	7	Mercy Nku	Nigeria	0.164	11.37	q
5	5	Liliana Allen	Mexico	0.154	11.42	q, SB
6	1	Geraldine Pillay	South Africa	0.178	11.44	
7	6	Tit Linda Sou	Cambodia	0.235	13.47	PB
8	4	Katura Marae	Vanuatu		13.49	SB

==== Heat 2 ====
Wind: +0.9 m/s

Rank	Lane	Athlete	Nation	Reaction	Time	Notes
1	3	Yulia Nestsiarenka	Belarus	0.240	10.94	Q, NR
2	4	Merlene Ottey	Slovenia	0.195	11.14	Q
3	2	Larisa Kruglova	Russia	0.207	11.23	Q, =PB
4	6	Guzel Khubbieva	Uzbekistan	0.153	11.31	q
5	5	Rakia Al-Gassra	Bahrain	0.250	11.49	NR
6	7	Winneth Dube	Zimbabwe	0.211	11.56	
7	1	Evangeleen Ikelap	Federated States of Micronesia	0.221	13.50	=PB
8	8	Danah Al-Nasrallah	Kuwait		13.92	NR

==== Heat 3 ====
Wind: −0.7 m/s

Rank	Lane	Athlete	Nation	Reaction	Time	Notes
1	7	Lauryn Williams	United States	0.247	11.16	Q
2	1	Irina Khabarova	Russia	0.154	11.32	Q
3	4	Fana Ashby	Trinidad and Tobago	0.177	11.43	Q
4	8	Affoué Amandine Allou	Ivory Coast	0.182	11.46	
5	2	Melisa Murillo	Colombia	0.185	11.67	
6	6	Elena Bobrovskaya	Kyrgyzstan	0.180	11.76	
7	5	Ngerak Florencio	Palau	0.222	12.76	PB
8	3	Aminata Kamissoko	Mauritania	0.179	13.49	

==== Heat 4 ====
Wind: −0.1 m/s

Rank	Lane	Athlete	Nation	Reaction	Time	Notes
1	8	Yuliya Tabakova	Russia	0.217	11.22	Q
2	5	Sherone Simpson	Jamaica	0.173	11.27	Q
3	2	Chandra Sturrup	Bahamas	0.138	11.37	Q, SB
4	6	Bettina Müller	Austria	0.162	11.39	q
5	1	Johanna Manninen	Finland	0.157	11.45	
6	7	Sina Schielke	Germany	0.194	11.46	
7	4	Kaitinano Mwemweata	Kiribati	0.257	13.07	PB
8	3	Philaylack Sackpraseuth	Laos		13.42	

==== Heat 5 ====
Wind: −0.8 m/s

Rank	Lane	Athlete	Nation	Reaction	Time	Notes
1	1	LaTasha Colander	United States	0.178	11.31	Q
2	7	Endurance Ojokolo	Nigeria	0.203	11.36	Q
3	2	Natasha Mayers	Saint Vincent and the Grenadines	0.158	11.45	Q
4	4	Tetyana Tkalich	Ukraine	0.210	11.58	
5	6	Basma Al-Eshosh	Jordan	0.199	12.09	NR
6	8	Aleksandra Vojnevska	Macedonia	0.193	12.15	
7	3	Li Xuemei	China	0.190	12.21	
8	5	Jenny Keni	Solomon Islands		12.76	

==== Heat 6 ====
Wind: −0.3 m/s

Rank	Lane	Athlete	Nation	Reaction	Time	Notes
1	1	Veronica Campbell	Jamaica	0.166	11.17	Q
2	4	Zhanna Block	Ukraine	0.186	11.27	Q
3	6	Gail Devers	United States	0.215	11.29	Q
4	7	La Verne Jones	Virgin Islands	0.246	11.38	q
5	3	Agnė Eggerth	Lithuania	0.177	11.44	
6	8	Heather Samuel	Antigua and Barbuda	0.158	12.05	
7	2	Robina Muqim Yaar	Afghanistan	0.241	14.14	NR
8	5	Fartun Abukar Omar	Somalia		14.29	PB

==== Heat 7 ====
Wind: 0.0 m/s

Rank	Lane	Athlete	Nation	Reaction	Time	Notes
1	6	Vida Anim	Ghana	0.174	11.14	Q, NR
1	2	Christine Arron	France	0.172	11.14	Q
3	1	Kim Gevaert	Belgium	0.148	11.18	Q
4	4	Karin Mayr-Krifka	Austria	0.165	11.40	q
5	7	Rosemar Coelho Neto	Brazil	0.237	11.43	q
6	3	Mae Koime	Papua New Guinea	0.195	12.00	NR
7	8	Hawanatu Bangura	Sierra Leone	0.176	12.11	
8	5	Alaa Jassim	Iraq		12.70	

==== Heat 8 ====
Wind: −0.3 m/s

Rank	Lane	Athlete	Nation	Reaction	Time	Notes
1	4	Ivet Lalova	Bulgaria	0.159	11.16	Q
2	3	Abi Oyepitan	Great Britain	0.181	11.23	Q
3	8	Lyubov Perepelova	Uzbekistan	0.208	11.30	Q
4	2	Delphine Atangana	Cameroon	0.166	11.40	q
5	7	Viktoriya Koviyreva	Kazakhstan	0.207	11.62	
6	5	Marine Ghazaryan	Armenia	0.177	12.29	
7	6	Carol Mokola	Zambia	0.210	12.35	

=== Quarterfinals ===
Qualification rule: The first three finishers in each heat (Q) plus the next four fastest overall runners (q) advance to the semifinals.

==== Quarterfinal 1 ====
Wind: +0.2 m/s

Rank	Lane	Athlete	Nation	Reaction	Time	Notes
1	6	Christine Arron	France	0.192	11.10	Q
2	4	Veronica Campbell	Jamaica	0.212	11.18	Q
3	3	Abi Oyepitan	Great Britain	0.198	11.28	Q
4	7	Gail Devers	United States	0.207	11.31	q
5	5	Irina Khabarova	Russia	0.189	11.32	
6	2	La Verne Jones	Virgin Islands	0.249	11.44	
7	1	Chandra Sturrup	Bahamas	0.185	11.46	
8	8	Delphine Atangana	Cameroon	0.189	11.60	

==== Quarterfinal 2 ====
Wind: 0.0 m/s

Rank	Lane	Athlete	Nation	Reaction	Time	Notes
1	5	Lauryn Williams	United States	0.214	11.03	Q
2	6	Ivet Lalova	Bulgaria	0.162	11.09	Q
3	8	Debbie Ferguson	Bahamas	0.188	11.16	Q
4	2	Lyubov Perepelova	Uzbekistan	0.212	11.26	q
5	4	Zhanna Block	Ukraine	0.186	11.27	q
6	3	Véronique Mang	France	0.190	11.39	
7	7	Bettina Müller	Austria	0.196	11.50	
8	1	Karin Mayr-Krifka	Austria	0.203	11.55	

==== Quarterfinal 3 ====
Wind: −0.1 m/s

Rank	Lane	Athlete	Nation	Reaction	Time	Notes
1	4	Sherone Simpson	Jamaica	0.157	11.09	Q
2	6	Aleen Bailey	Jamaica	0.220	11.12	Q
3	5	Merlene Ottey	Slovenia	0.179	11.24	Q
4	8	Larisa Kruglova	Russia	0.196	11.36	
5	1	Mercy Nku	Nigeria	0.154	11.39	
6	7	Liliana Allen	Mexico	0.175	11.52	
7	2	Fana Ashby	Trinidad and Tobago	0.178	11.54	
—	3	Vida Anim	Ghana	0.175	DNF	

==== Quarterfinal 4 ====
Wind: +0.3 m/s

Rank	Lane	Athlete	Nation	Reaction	Time	Notes
1	4	Yulia Nestsiarenka	Belarus	0.206	10.99	Q
2	2	Kim Gevaert	Belgium	0.155	11.17	Q
3	3	LaTasha Colander	United States	0.176	11.20	Q
4	5	Yuliya Tabakova	Russia	0.204	11.25	q
5	6	Endurance Ojokolo	Nigeria	0.171	11.35	
6	8	Guzel Khubbieva	Uzbekistan	0.147	11.35	
7	1	Rosemar Coelho Neto	Brazil	0.194	11.45	
—	7	Natasha Mayers	Saint Vincent and the Grenadines		DNS	

=== Semifinals ===
Qualification rule: The first four runners in each semifinal heat (Q) moves on to the final.

==== Semifinal 1 ====
Wind: +0.1 m/s

Rank	Lane	Athlete	Nation	Reaction	Time	Notes
1	5	Yulia Nestsiarenka	Belarus	0.167	10.92	Q, NR
2	6	Veronica Campbell	Jamaica	0.165	10.93	Q, PB
3	3	Ivet Lalova	Bulgaria	0.155	11.04	Q
4	7	Debbie Ferguson	Bahamas	0.168	11.04	Q, SB
5	1	Abi Oyepitan	Great Britain	0.140	11.18	
6	4	Christine Arron	France	0.175	11.21	
7	2	Gail Devers	United States	0.165	11.22	
8	8	Yuliya Tabakova	Russia	0.179	11.25	

==== Semifinal 2 ====
Wind: −0.1 m/s

Rank	Lane	Athlete	Nation	Reaction	Time	Notes
1	6	Lauryn Williams	United States	0.205	11.01	Q
2	4	Sherone Simpson	Jamaica	0.154	11.03	Q
3	5	Aleen Bailey	Jamaica	0.206	11.13	Q
4	7	LaTasha Colander	United States	0.181	11.18	Q
5	1	Merlene Ottey	Slovenia	0.165	11.21	
6	2	Zhanna Block	Ukraine	0.159	11.23	SB
7	3	Kim Gevaert	Belgium	0.200	11.40	
8	8	Lyubov Perepelova	Uzbekistan	0.158	11.40	

=== Final ===
Wind: −0.1 m/s

Rank	Lane	Athlete	Nation	Reaction	Time	Notes
1st place, gold medalist(s)	6	Yulia Nestsiarenka	Belarus	0.186	10.93	
2nd place, silver medalist(s)	4	Lauryn Williams	United States	0.212	10.96	PB
3rd place, bronze medalist(s)	3	Veronica Campbell	Jamaica	0.199	10.97	
4	1	Ivet Lalova	Bulgaria	0.154	11.00	
5	2	Aleen Bailey	Jamaica	0.208	11.05	
6	5	Sherone Simpson	Jamaica	0.164	11.07	
7	8	Debbie Ferguson	Bahamas	0.177	11.16	
8	7	LaTasha Colander	United States	0.183	11.18	
