= 2004 African Championships in Athletics – Women's long jump =

The women's long jump event at the 2004 African Championships in Athletics was held in Brazzaville, Republic of the Congo on July 16.

== Results ==
Rank	Name	Nationality	Result	Notes
1st place, gold medalist(s)	Kéné Ndoye	Senegal	6.64	NR
2nd place, silver medalist(s)	Kadiatou Camara	Mali	6.29	
3rd place, bronze medalist(s)	Yah Koïta	Mali	6.27	
4	Joséphine Mbarga-Bikié	Cameroon	6.06	
5	Georgina Sowah	Ghana	5.91	
6	Chinedu Odozor	Nigeria	5.90	
7	Béatrice Kamboulé	Burkina Faso	5.82	
8	Estelle Brou	Ivory Coast	5.78	
