= Tetyana Tkalich =

Ukrainian sprinter

Medal record
Men's athletics
Representing Ukraine
World Junior Championships
Bronze medal – third place	1994 Lisbon	200 m

Tetyana Tkalich (Ukrainian: Тетяна Ткаліч, born 30 May 1975) is a retired Ukrainian sprinter who specialized in the 100 metres.

She won the bronze medal in the 200 metres at the 1994 World Junior Championships. She competed in the 100 metres at the 2004 Olympic Games without reaching the final. In the 4 x 100 metres relay she finished fifth at the 2002 European Championships, and fourth at the 2003 World Championships. She also competed at the 2004 Olympic Games without reaching the final.

Her personal best times are 7.15 seconds in the 60 metres (indoor), achieved in January 2004 in Zaporizhzhia; and 11.25 seconds in the 100 metres, achieved in May 2003 in Kharkiv; and 23.07 seconds in the 200 metres, achieved in September 1999 in Kyiv. She co-holds the Ukrainian record in the 4 x 100 metres relay.
