= Cydonie Mothersille =

Caymanian sprinter

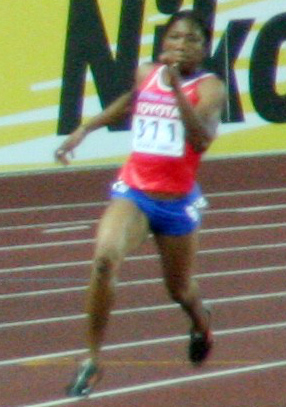
- Mothersille at the 2007 World Athletic Championships in Osaka

Personal information
- Born: 19 March 1978 (age 48) Jamaica
- Height: 1.71 m (5 ft 7 1/2 in)
- Weight: 57 kg (126 lb)

Sport
- Country: Cayman Islands
Medal record
Representing Cayman Islands
Women's athletics
World Championships
Bronze medal – third place	2001 Edmonton	200 m
Commonwealth Games
Gold medal – first place	2010 Delhi	200 m
Pan American Games
Silver medal – second place	2003 Santo Domingo	200 m
Central American and Caribbean Games
Gold medal – first place	2010 Mayagüez	200 m
Continental Cup
Bronze medal – third place	2010 Split	200 m
- Updated on 22 July 2012

Cydonie Camille Mothersille (born 19 March 1978) is a female former track and field sprinter from the Cayman Islands. Her speciality at the beginning of her career was the 100 metres, while the 200 metres gradually became her main event. She represented her country at four Olympic Games from 1996 to 2008, six World Championships in Athletics, and three Commonwealth Games. Her greatest achievements were in the 200 m, including a bronze at the 2001 World Championships in Athletics), Commonwealth gold in 2010 and a silver at the 2003 Pan American Games. Her World Championship medal was the first ever for her nation. It was achieved several years after the event, following doping disqualifications of Marion Jones and Kelli White of the United States.

Mothersille was born in Jamaica in 1978 and moved to Grand Cayman, Cayman Islands at age 7. While in high school, she was discovered by her high school's physical education teacher Evelyn Rockette and began her track career. Mothersille began competing for the Cayman Islands by competing in the CARIFTA Games, where she performed well with a 100/200 m sprint double in 1996. In 1996, she was awarded the Austin Sealy Trophy for the most outstanding athlete of the 1996 CARIFTA Games.

While in college she competed in the 100 m, 200 m, 4 × 100 m relay and 4 × 400 m relay for Clemson University. She was a part of the Clemson All American 4 x 100 and 4 x 400 team. She also later competed for the George Mason Patriots track and field team.

In 2011, Cydonie was the highest paid athlete from the Cayman Islands (male or female) making $85,000 (USD). Mothersille is married to Ato Stephens.

Mothersille was coached by Henry Rolle.

== International competitions ==
Year	Competition	Venue	Position	Event	Notes
Representing the Cayman Islands
1992	CARIFTA Games (U-17)	Nassau, Bahamas	8th	200 m	27.12 w
1993	CARIFTA Games (U-17)	Fort-de-France, Martinique	8th	100 m	12.52 (−0.6 m/s)
1994	CARIFTA Games (U-17)	Bridgetown, Barbados	3rd	100 m	11.97
1994	CARIFTA Games (U-17)	Bridgetown, Barbados	2nd	200 m	24.31
1994	Central American and Caribbean Junior Championships (U-17)	Port of Spain, Trinidad and Tobago	8th	100 m	12.1 (−0.4 m/s)
1994	Central American and Caribbean Junior Championships (U-17)	Port of Spain, Trinidad and Tobago	2nd	200 m	24.8 (−2.3 m/s)
1994	World Junior Championships	Lisbon, Portugal	27th (h)	200m	24.65 (wind: +1.0 m/s)
1995	CARIFTA Games (U-20)	George Town, Cayman Island	3rd	100 m	11.72
1995	CARIFTA Games (U-20)	George Town, Cayman Island	3rd	200 m	23.83
1996	CARIFTA Games (U-20)	Kingston, Jamaica	1st	100 m	11.35 (0.9 m/s)
1996	CARIFTA Games (U-20)	Kingston, Jamaica	1st	200 m	23.77 (−4.4 m/s)
1996	Olympic Games	Atlanta, United States	6th (h)	100 m	11.61 (0.6 m/s)
1996	World Junior Championships	Sydney, Australia	6th	100m	11.51 (wind: +0.6 m/s)
1996	World Junior Championships	Sydney, Australia	11th (qf)	200m	24.20 (wind: -3.1 m/s)
1997	CARIFTA Games (U-20)	Bridgetown, Barbados	1st	100 m	11.54 (0.0 m/s)
1997	World Championships	Athens, Greece	6th (h)	100 m	11.87 (−1.5 m/s)
1998	Central American and Caribbean Games	Maracaibo, Venezuela	12th (h)	100 m	11.65
1998	Central American and Caribbean Games	Maracaibo, Venezuela	8th (h)	200 m	24.16
2000	NACAC U-25 Championships	Monterrey, Mexico	3rd	100 m	11.83 (wind: -1.6 m/s)
2000	NACAC U-25 Championships	Monterrey, Mexico	2nd	200 m	23.72 (wind: -3.1 m/s)
2000	Olympic Games	Sydney, Australia	4th (h)	100 m	11.38 (−0.4 m/s)
2000	Olympic Games	Sydney, Australia	4th (h)	200 m	22.78 (0.2 m/s)
2001	World Championships	Edmonton, Canada	3rd	200 m	22.88 (−0.3 m/s)
2002	Commonwealth Games	Manchester, England	5th	200 m	
2003	World Indoor Championships	Birmingham, United Kingdom	5th	200 m	
2003	World Championships	Paris, France	7th (sf)	200 m	23.07 (−0.2 m/s)
2003	World Athletics Final	Monte Carlo, Monaco	7th	200 m	
2003	Pan American Games	Santo Domingo, Dominican Republic	2nd	200 m	
2004	Olympic Games	Athens, Greece	5th (sf)	200 m	22.76 (1.1 m/s)
2004	World Athletics Final	Monte Carlo, Monaco	6th	200 m	
2005	World Championships	Helsinki, Finland	8th	200 m	23.00 (0.2 m/s)
2007	World Championships	Osaka, Japan	8th	200 m	23.08 (1.7 m/s)
2008	Olympic Games	Beijing, China	8th	200 m	22.68 (0.6 m/s)
2009	World Championships	Berlin, Germany	4th (sf)	200 m	22.80 (0.3 m/s)
2010	Commonwealth Games	New Delhi, India	1st	200 m	22.89
