= Bettina Müller-Weissina =

Austrian sprinter

Bettina Müller-Weissina (born July 12, 1973) is a retired Austrian sprinter.

== 2004 Olympics ==
At the 2004 Olympics she reached the quarterfinals in the Women's 100 metres.

== World Championships ==
She made three appearances at the IAAF World Indoor Championships - 2003, 2004, and 2008 - finishing as a semi-finalist each time.

== European Championships ==
She competed in the 2002 European Athletics Championships and 2006 European Athletics Championships, but did not advance. She advanced to the semi-finals and narrowly lost an opportunity to reach the finals of the 60 meters at the 2009 European Athletics Indoor Championships and also competed in the 2002 European Athletics Indoor Championships and the 2007 European Athletics Indoor Championships.

== Military career ==
She was also a silver medalist in the 100 meters at the 2007 Military World Games.

She was also a silver medalist in the 100 meters at the 2009 World Military Track and Field Championships.

== Doping allegations ==
In 2010, she came under doping suspicion.
