= Debbie Ferguson-McKenzie =

Bahamian sprinter (born 1976)

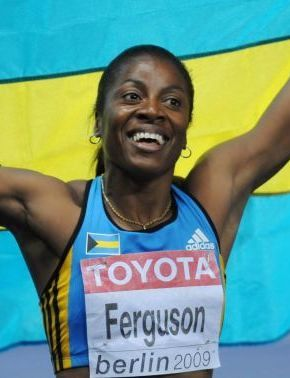
- Ferguson-McKenzie at the 2009 World Championships

Personal information
- Born: January 16, 1976 (age 50) Nassau, Bahamas

Sport
- Sport: Track and field
- College team: Georgia Bulldogs
Medal record
Women's Athletics
Representing Bahamas
Olympic Games
Gold medal – first place	2000 Sydney	4 × 100 m relay
Silver medal – second place	1996 Atlanta	4 × 100 m relay
Bronze medal – third place	2004 Athens	200 m
World Championships
Gold medal – first place	1999 Seville	4 × 100 m relay
Gold medal – first place	2001 Edmonton	200 m
Silver medal – second place	2009 Berlin	4 × 100 m relay
Bronze medal – third place	2009 Berlin	200 m
Pan American Games
Gold medal – first place	1999 Winnipeg	200 m
World Athletics Final
Silver medal – second place	2004 Monaco	200 m
Silver medal – second place	2007 Stuttgart	200 m
CAC Championships In Athletics
Gold medal – first place	1997 San Juan	100 m
Gold medal – first place	1997 Grenada	4 × 100 m relay
Gold medal – first place	2003 Grenada	4 × 100 m relay
Gold medal – first place	2008 Cali	200 m
Silver medal – second place	1993 Cali	200 m
Silver medal – second place	1993 Cali	4 × 100 m relay
Bronze medal – third place	2008 Cali	4 × 100 m relay
Bronze medal – third place	2013 Morelia	4 × 100 m relay
Commonwealth Games
Gold medal – first place	2002 Manchester	100 m
Gold medal – first place	2002 Manchester	200 m
Gold medal – first place	2002 Manchester	4 × 100 m relay
Continental Cup
Gold medal – first place	2002 Madrid	200 m
Gold medal – first place	2002 Madrid	4 × 100 m relay
Gold medal – first place	2006 Athens	4 × 100 m relay
Gold medal – first place	2010 Split	4 × 100 m relay
Goodwill Games
Gold medal – first place	1998 Uniondale	4 × 100 m relay
Gold medal – first place	2001 Brisbane	200 m
CAC Junior Championships (U20)
Gold medal – first place	1994 Port of Spain	100 m
Silver medal – second place	1994 Port of Spain	200 m
CAC Junior Championships (U17)
Gold medal – first place	1990 Havana	4 × 400 m relay
Gold medal – first place	1992 Tegucigalpa	100 m
Gold medal – first place	1992 Tegucigalpa	200 m
Bronze medal – third place	1990 Havana	Pentathlon
Bronze medal – third place	1990 Havana	4 × 100 m relay
CARIFTA Games Junior (U20)
Gold medal – first place	1994 Bridgetown	100 m
Gold medal – first place	1994 Bridgetown	200 m
Gold medal – first place	1995 George Town	100 m
Gold medal – first place	1995 George Town	200 m
Gold medal – first place	1995 George Town	4 × 100 m relay
Silver medal – second place	1992 Nassau	4 × 100 m relay
Silver medal – second place	1992 Nassau	4 × 400 m relay
Silver medal – second place	1993 Fort-de-France	4 × 100 m relay
Silver medal – second place	1993 Fort-de-France	4 × 400 m relay
Silver medal – second place	1994 Bridgetown	4 × 100 m relay
Silver medal – second place	1994 Bridgetown	4 × 400 m relay
Silver medal – second place	1995 George Town	4 × 400 m relay
Bronze medal – third place	1993 Fort-de-France	100 m
CARIFTA Games Youth (U17)
Gold medal – first place	1991 Port of Spain	100 m
Gold medal – first place	1992 Nassau	100 m
Silver medal – second place	1992 Nassau	200 m
Silver medal – second place	1992 Nassau	400 m
Bronze medal – third place	1991 Port of Spain	200 m

Debbie Ferguson-McKenzie, née Debbie Ferguson, (16 January 1976) is a former Bahamian sprinter who specialised in the 100 and 200 metres. Ferguson-McKenzie participated in five Olympics.

Ferguson-McKenzie is assistant coach of track and field at University of Kentucky. Previously, she coached for four years at the University of Houston.

In 1995, she was awarded the Austin Sealy Trophy for the most outstanding athlete of the 1995 CARIFTA Games. In total she won 7 gold, 9 silver, and 2 bronze CARIFTA Games medals.

She had her first major successes with the Bahamian 4 × 100 metres relay team, winning gold at the Pan American Games and World Championships in Athletics in 1999, and taking another gold at the Olympic Games the following year. She won her first individual gold medal at the 2001 World Championships – having initially won silver, gold medallist Marion Jones was later disqualified.

The 2002 season was a career high for Ferguson-McKenzie: she won five gold medals, with victories at the IAAF World Cup and Grand Prix Final, and a 100 m, 200 m and relay gold at the 2002 Commonwealth Games. Her performance in the 100 m remains a personal best, and her time in the 200 m was a commonwealth games record and fastest by any athlete that year. She won her only individual Olympic medal in 2004, taking bronze in the 200 m. Injury ruled her out for the whole of 2005. She failed to reach the finals at the 2007 World Championships, unable to compete with the new generation of American and Jamaican sprinters. However, she managed to reach the 100 and 200 metres finals at the 2008 Beijing Olympics.

She was the previous 200 m national record holder with a best of 22.19 seconds. Her record was broken by Shaunae Miller-Uibo (22.05 seconds) at the 2016 Jamaica Grand Prix. Her 100 m best (10.91) is the second fastest time by a Bahamian after Chandra Sturrup.

In 2014 Ferguson-McKenzie became the women's sprints and hurdles coach for the track and field program at the University of Houston.

Ferguson-McKenzie was coached some part of her professional career by Henry Rolle.

== Career ==
Ferguson attended St Andrew's School in Nassau, Bahamas and graduated in 1994.

Ferguson graduated from University of Georgia from where she launched her senior athletics career since which she has gained medals at the Summer Olympics, IAAF World Championships in Athletics, Commonwealth Games and Pan American Games.

In 2002, she was appointed as an ambassador for the United Nations Food and Agriculture Organization. At the 2002 Commonwealth Games in Manchester, England, she set the championship record in the 100 metres and in the 4 × 100 m relay with the Bahamian team, recording a personal best of 10.91 seconds in the individual event.

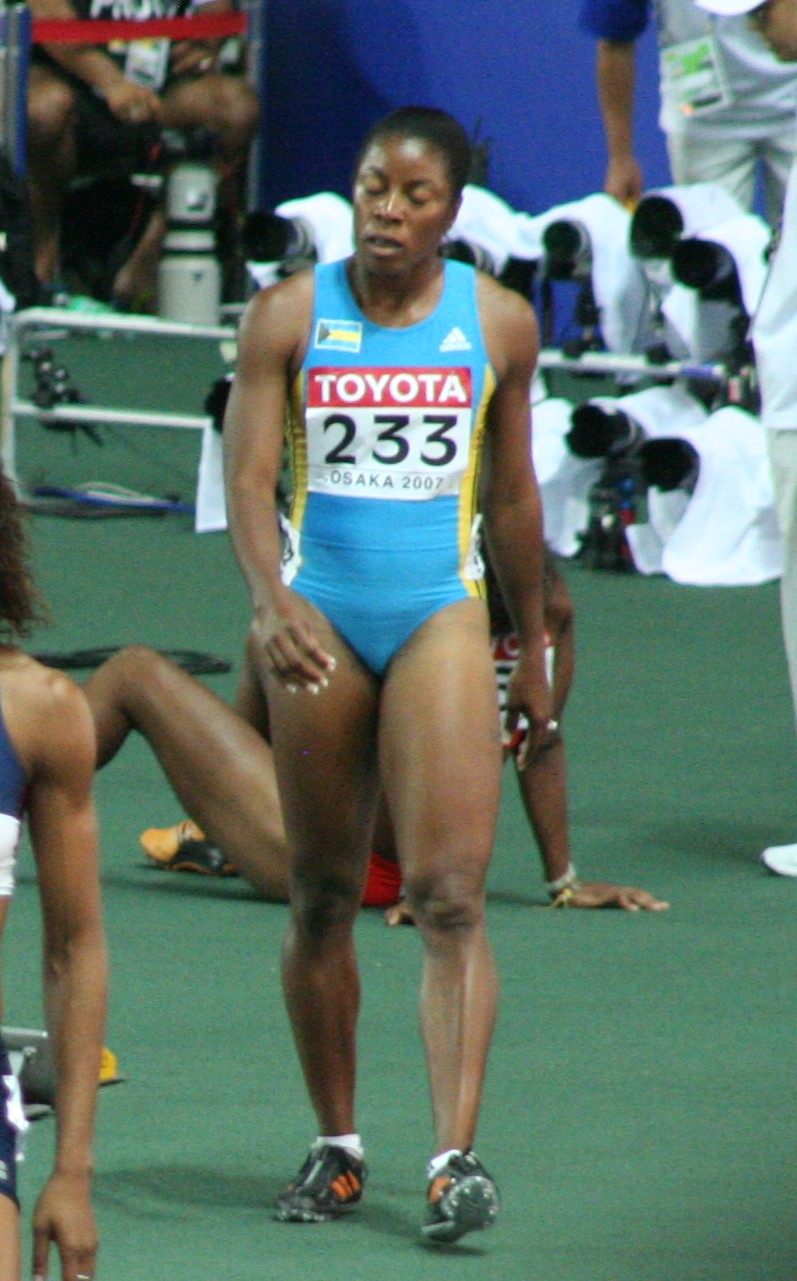
Ferguson-McKenzie in competition at the 2007 World Championships.

At the 2008 Summer Olympics in Beijing she competed at the 100 metres sprint. In her first round heat she placed second behind Oludamola Osayomi in a time of 11.17 to advance to the second round. There she won her series to qualify for the semi-finals in a time of 11.21, this time finishing in front of Osayomi. Despite fellow Bahamian Chandra Sturrup being unable to qualify for the final with a time of 11.22 in the first semi final, Ferguson managed to qualify with the same time as she finished fourth in her race, while Sturrup finished fifth in hers. In the final Ferguson came to 11.19 seconds, which was the 7th position.

She competed at the 2009 Manchester City Games, winning the 150 metres final in 16.54 seconds. She followed this up with a win in the 200 m at the Meeting Mohammed VI d' Athlétisme in Rabat. At the 25th Vardinoyiannia in Rethymno, Greece, she ran a world-leading time of 22.32 seconds to win the 200 m and set a meeting record. Now trains in Clermont, Florida, at the NTC.

== Major competition record ==
Year	Competition	Venue	Position	Event	Notes
Representing the Bahamas
1990	Central American and Caribbean Junior Championships (U-17)	Havana, Cuba	3rd	Pentathlon	3015pts
1990	Central American and Caribbean Junior Championships (U-17)	Havana, Cuba	3rd	4 × 100 m relay	47.66
1990	Central American and Caribbean Junior Championships (U-17)	Havana, Cuba	1st	4 × 400 m relay	3:47.22
1991	CARIFTA Games (U-17)	Port of Spain, Trinidad and Tobago	1st	100 m	11.89 w (2.4 m/s)
1991	CARIFTA Games (U-17)	Port of Spain, Trinidad and Tobago	3rd	200 m	24.86
1992	CARIFTA Games (U-17)	Nassau, Bahamas	1st	100 m	11.79
1992	CARIFTA Games (U-17)	Nassau, Bahamas	2nd	200 m	23.97 w
1992	CARIFTA Games (U-17)	Nassau, Bahamas	2nd	400 m	54.68
1992	CARIFTA Games (U-20)	Nassau, Bahamas	2nd	4 × 100 m relay	45.61
1992	CARIFTA Games (U-20)	Nassau, Bahamas	2nd	4 × 400 m relay	3:42.37
1992	Central American and Caribbean Junior Championships (U-17)	Tegucigalpa, Honduras	1st	100 m	12.0 (0.0 m/s)
1992	Central American and Caribbean Junior Championships (U-17)	Tegucigalpa, Honduras	1st	200 m	24.2 (-0.1 m/s)
1992	World Junior Championships	Seoul, South Korea	21st (qf)	100 m	11.92 (wind: +1.9 m/s)
1992	World Junior Championships	Seoul, South Korea	23rd (sf)	200 m	24.74 (wind: +0.7 m/s)
1993	CARIFTA Games (U-20)	Fort-de-France, Martinique	3rd	100 m	11.79 (0.3 m/s)
1993	CARIFTA Games (U-20)	Fort-de-France, Martinique	4th	200 m	24.09 (-1.2 m/s)
1993	CARIFTA Games (U-20)	Fort-de-France, Martinique	2nd	4 × 100 m relay	45.53
1993	CARIFTA Games (U-20)	Fort-de-France, Martinique	2nd	4 × 400 m relay	3:39.32
1993	Central American and Caribbean Championships	Cali, Colombia	2nd	200 m	23.32 w
1993	Central American and Caribbean Championships	Cali, Colombia	2nd	4 × 100 m relay	44.28
1994	CARIFTA Games (U-20)	Bridgetown, Barbados	1st	100 m	11.58
1994	CARIFTA Games (U-20)	Bridgetown, Barbados	1st	200 m	23.53
1994	CARIFTA Games (U-20)	Bridgetown, Barbados	2nd	4 × 100 m relay	45.66
1994	CARIFTA Games (U-20)	Bridgetown, Barbados	2nd	4 × 400 m relay	3:36.53
1994	Central American and Caribbean Junior Championships (U-20)	Port of Spain, Trinidad and Tobago	1st	100 m	11.1 (-1.8 m/s)
1994	Central American and Caribbean Junior Championships (U-20)	Port of Spain, Trinidad and Tobago	2nd	200 m	23.8 (-1.8 m/s)
1994	World Junior Championships	Lisbon, Portugal	5th	100 m	11.48 (wind: +2.0 m/s)
1994	World Junior Championships	Lisbon, Portugal	4th	200 m	23.59 w (wind: +2.2 m/s)
1994	World Junior Championships	Lisbon, Portugal	12th (h)	4 × 400 m relay	3:44.67
1994	Commonwealth Games	Victoria, Canada	12th (sf)	200 m	23.68
1994	Commonwealth Games	Victoria, Canada	5th	4 × 100 m relay	44.89
1995	CARIFTA Games (U-20)	George Town, Cayman Islands	1st	100 m	11.35
1995	CARIFTA Games (U-20)	George Town, Cayman Islands	1st	200 m	23.17
1995	CARIFTA Games (U-20)	George Town, Cayman Islands	1st	4 × 100 m relay	45.00
1995	CARIFTA Games (U-20)	George Town, Cayman Islands	2nd	4 × 400 m relay	3:39.46
1995	World Championships	Gothenburg, Sweden	27th (h)	200 m	23.33 (0.0 m/s)
1995	World Championships	Gothenburg, Sweden	4th	4 × 100 m relay	43.14
1996	Olympic Games	Atlanta, United States	13th (sf)	100 m	11.28 (0.4 m/s)
1996	Olympic Games	Atlanta, United States	2nd	4 × 100 m relay	43.14 (h)
1997	Central American and Caribbean Championships	San Juan, Puerto Rico	1st	100 m	11.29
1997	Central American and Caribbean Championships	San Juan, Puerto Rico	1st	4 × 100 m relay	44.00
1997	World Championships	Athens, Greece	7th (sf)	100 m	11.39 (-0.1 m/s)
1997	World Championships	Athens, Greece	6th	4 × 100 m relay	42.77
1999	World Championships	Seville, Spain	9th (sf)	100 m	11.12 (-0.1 m/s)
1999	World Championships	Seville, Spain	5th	200 m	22.28 (0.6 m/s)
1999	World Championships	Seville, Spain	1st	4 × 100 m relay	41.92 WL
1999	Pan American Games	Winnipeg, Canada	1st	200 m	22.83 (0.7 m/s)
2000	Olympic Games	Sydney, Australia	8th	100 m	11.29 (-0.4 m/s)
2000	Olympic Games	Sydney, Australia	4th	200 m	22.37 (0.7 m/s)
2000	Olympic Games	Sydney, Australia	1st	4 × 100 m relay	41.95 SB
2001	World Championships	Edmonton, Canada	5th	100 m	11.13 (-0.3 m/s)
2001	World Championships	Edmonton, Canada	1st	200 m	22.52
2001	IAAF Grand Prix Final	Melbourne, Australia	2nd	200 m	23.00
2002	Commonwealth Games	Manchester, England	1st	100 m	10.91 GR
2002	Commonwealth Games	Manchester, England	1st	200 m	22.20 GR
2002	Commonwealth Games	Manchester, England	1st	4 × 100 m relay	42.44 GR
2002	IAAF World Cup	Madrid, Spain	1st	200 m	22.49
2002	IAAF Grand Prix Final	Paris, France	1st	100 m	10.97
2003	Central American and Caribbean Championships	St. George's, Grenada	1st	4 × 100 m relay	43.06
2003	World Championships	Paris, France	10th (sf)	100 m	11.27 (0.4 m/s)
2003	World Championships	Paris, France	12th (qf)	200 m	22.98 (-0.2 m/s)
2003	World Championships	Paris, France	8th (h)	4 × 100 m relay	43.64
2004	Olympic Games	Athens, Greece	7th	100 m	11.16 (-0.1 m/s)
2004	Olympic Games	Athens, Greece	3rd	200 m	22.30
2004	Olympic Games	Athens, Greece	4th	4 × 100 m relay	42.69
2004	World Athletics Final	Monaco	2nd	200 m	22.66
2007	World Championships	Osaka, Japan	14th (sf)	100 m	11.25 (-0.1 m/s)
2007	World Championships	Osaka, Japan	14th (sf)	200 m	23.27 (-0.4 m/s)
2007	World Athletics Final	Stuttgart, Germany	2nd	200 m	22.74
2008	Central American and Caribbean Championships	Cali, Colombia	1st	200 m	22.78
2008	Central American and Caribbean Championships	Cali, Colombia	3rd	4 × 100 m relay	44.03
2008	Olympic Games	Beijing, China	7th	100 m	11.19
2008	Olympic Games	Beijing, China	7th	200 m	22.61
2009	World Championships	Berlin, Germany	6th	100 m	11.05 (0.1 m/s)
2009	World Championships	Berlin, Germany	3rd	200 m	22.41 (-0.1 m/s)
2009	World Championships	Berlin, Germany	2nd	4 × 100 m relay	42.29 SB
2011	World Championships	Daegu, South Korea	6th	200 m	22.96 (-1.0 m/s)
2011	World Championships	Daegu, South Korea	17th (h)	4 × 100 m relay	50.62
2012	Olympic Games	London, United Kingdom	24th (h)	100 m	11.32
2012	Olympic Games	London, United Kingdom	38th (h)	200 m	22.61
2013	Central American and Caribbean Championships	Morelia, Mexico	7th	100 m	11.85
2013	Central American and Caribbean Championships	Morelia, Mexico	3rd	4 × 100 m relay	44.08

On 16 October 2002 Debbie Ferguson-McKenzie was nominated Goodwill Ambassador of the Food and Agriculture Organization of the United Nations (FAO).

Sporting positions
Preceded by (United States) Marion Jones	Women's 200 m Best Year Performance; 2001 – 2002	Succeeded by (United States) Allyson Felix
Olympic Games
Preceded by Pauline Davis-Thompson	Flagbearer for Bahamas; Athens 2004; Beijing 2008	Succeeded by Chris Brown
