= Chandra Sturrup =

Bahamian sprinter

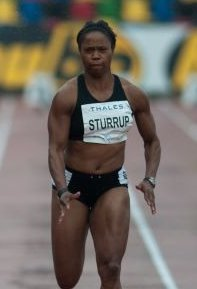

Personal information
- Born: September 12, 1971 (age 55) Nassau, Bahamas

Sport
- Sport: Track and field
Medal record
Representing Bahamas
Olympic Games
Gold medal – first place	2000 Sydney	4 × 100 m relay
Silver medal – second place	1996 Atlanta	4 × 100 m relay
World Championships
Gold medal – first place	1999 Seville	4 × 100 m relay
Silver medal – second place	2009 Berlin	4 × 100 m relay
Bronze medal – third place	2001 Edmonton	100 m
Silver medal – second place	2003 Paris	100 m
Pan American Games
Gold medal – first place	1999 Winnipeg	100 m
Bronze medal – third place	2007 Rio de Janeiro	100 m
Central American and Caribbean Games
Gold medal – first place	1998 Maracaibo	100 m
Bronze medal – third place	1993 Ponce	100 m
Central American and Caribbean Championships in Athletics
Gold medal – first place	1997 San Juan	4 × 100 m relay
Gold medal – first place	2005 Nassau	100 m
Gold medal – first place	2008 Cali	100 m
Silver medal – second place	1989 San Juan	4 × 100 m relay
Silver medal – second place	1993 Cali	4 × 100 m relay
Silver medal – second place	2005 Nassau	4 × 100 m relay
Bronze medal – third place	2008 Cali	4 × 100 m relay
Commonwealth Games
Gold medal – first place	1998 Kuala Lumpur	100 m
Gold medal – first place	2002 Manchester	4 × 100 m relay
World Indoor Championships
Gold medal – first place	2001 Lisbon	60 metres
Continental Cup
Silver medal – second place	1998 Johannesburg	100 m
Silver medal – second place	1998 Johannesburg	4 × 100 m relay
CAC Junior Championships (U20)
Gold medal – first place	1988 Nassau	100 m
Silver medal – second place	1988 Nassau	200 m
Silver medal – second place	1988 Nassau	4 × 100 m relay
Bronze medal – third place	1990 Havana	100 m
Bronze medal – third place	1990 Havana	4 × 100 m relay
Bronze medal – third place	1990 Havana	4 × 400 m relay
CARIFTA Games Junior (U20)
Silver medal – second place	1989 Bridgetown	200 m
Bronze medal – third place	1988 Kingston	200 m
Bronze medal – third place	1990 Kingston	100 m
Bronze medal – third place	1990 Kingston	200 m

Chandra Vanessa Sturrup (born September 12, 1971) is a Bahamian track and field sprint athlete.

== Career ==
She is a 100 m specialist and the Bahamian record holder for the women's 100 m with a personal best of 10.84 set in Lausanne, Switzerland on July 5, 2005. Sturrup is an alumnus of Norfolk State University, and has taken part in almost every major event since 1991 after the birth of her son, Shawn Murray Jr. For most of her career, she was coached by Trevor Graham.

Sturrup competed at the 2008 Summer Olympics in Beijing at the 100 metres sprint. In her first-round heat she placed first in front of Kelly-Ann Baptiste and Lina Grincikaite in a time of 11.30 to advance to the second round. There she improved her time to 11.16 and placed third behind Sherone Simpson and Muna Lee. In her semi final Sturrup finished in fifth position with 11.22 seconds, causing elimination. Her fellow Bahamian Debbie Ferguson qualified for the final with the same time, but she finished fourth in her semi final.

== Achievements ==
Chandra Vanessa Sturrup athletic achievements
Year	Event		Place
2005	World Championships	100 m	fourth place
2003	World Championships	100 m	bronze medal
2002	Commonwealth Games	4 × 100 m relay	gold medal
2001	World Championships	100 m	bronze medal
2001	World Indoor Championships	60 m	gold medal
2000	Summer Olympics	4 × 100 m relay	gold medal
2000	Summer Olympics	100 m	sixth place
1999	World Championships	4 × 100 m relay	gold medal
1999	World Championships	100 m	seventh place
1998	Commonwealth Games	100 m	gold medal
1997	World Indoor Championships	60 m	silver medal
1996	Summer Olympics	4 × 100 m relay	silver medal
1996	Summer Olympics	100 m	fourth place

=== Record in major international events ===
Year	Competition	Venue	Position	Event	Notes
Representing the Bahamas
1988	CARIFTA Games (U-20)	Kingston, Jamaica	3rd	200 m	24.6
1988	Central American and Caribbean Junior Championships (U-20)	Nassau, Bahamas	1st	100 m	11.96
1988	Central American and Caribbean Junior Championships (U-20)	Nassau, Bahamas	2nd	200 m	24.27 (-0.3 m/s)
1988	Central American and Caribbean Junior Championships (U-20)	Nassau, Bahamas	2nd	4 × 100 m relay	46.77
1988	World Junior Championships	Sudbury, Canada	15th (sf)	100 m	11.93 (wind: -0.7 m/s)
1988	World Junior Championships	Sudbury, Canada	11th (sf)	200 m	23.96 w (wind: +2.7 m/s)
1989	CARIFTA Games (U-20)	Bridgetown, Barbados	2nd	200 m	24.1
1990	CARIFTA Games (U-20)	Kingston, Jamaica	3rd	100 m	11.84 (1.3 m/s)
1990	CARIFTA Games (U-20)	Kingston, Jamaica	3rd	200 m	24.15 (-0.2 m/s)
1990	Central American and Caribbean Junior Championships (U-20)	Havana, Cuba	3rd	100 m	11.89 (-0.4 m/s)
1990	Central American and Caribbean Junior Championships (U-20)	Havana, Cuba	4th	200 m	24.22 (-0.5 m/s)
1990	Central American and Caribbean Junior Championships (U-20)	Havana, Cuba	3rd	4 × 100 m relay	47.44
1990	Central American and Caribbean Junior Championships (U-20)	Havana, Cuba	3rd	4 × 400 m relay	3:54.54
1990	World Junior Championships	Plovdiv, Bulgaria	6th (sf)	100 m	11.62 (wind: +1.0 m/s)
1990	World Junior Championships	Plovdiv, Bulgaria	6th	200 m	23.81 (wind: +1.3 m/s)
1993	Central American and Caribbean Championships	Cali, Colombia	2nd	4 × 100 m relay	44.28
1993	Central American and Caribbean Games	Ponce, Puerto Rico	3rd	100 m	11.89
1993	Central American and Caribbean Games	Ponce, Puerto Rico	5th	200 m	23.94
1995	World Championships	Gothenburg, Sweden	5th (h)	100 m	11.59 (0.5 m/s)
1996	Summer Olympics	Atlanta, United States	4th	100 m	11.00 (-0.7 m/s)
1996	Summer Olympics	Atlanta, United States	6th	200 m	22.54 (0.3 m/s)
1996	Summer Olympics	Atlanta, United States	2nd	4 × 100 m relay	42.14
1997	World Championships	Athens, Greece	6th (qf)	200 m	23.07 (0.3 m/s)
1998	Central American and Caribbean Games	Maracaibo, Venezuela	1st	100 m	11.14
1998	Central American and Caribbean Games	Maracaibo, Venezuela	–	4 × 100 m relay	DQ
1999	World Championships	Seville, Spain	7th	100 m	11.06 (-0.1 m/s)
1999	World Championships	Seville, Spain	6th (sf)	200 m	22.75 (0.5 m/s)
1999	World Championships	Seville, Spain	1st	4 × 100 m relay	41.92 WL
2000	Summer Olympics	Sydney, Australia	6th	100 m	11.21 (-0.4 m/s)
2000	Summer Olympics	Sydney, Australia	3rd (h)	200 m	23.09 (1.6 m/s)
2000	Summer Olympics	Sydney, Australia	1st	4 × 100 m relay	41.95 SB
2001	World Championships	Edmonton, Canada	3rd	100 m	11.02 (-0.3 m/s)
2003	World Championships	Paris, France	3rd	100 m	11.02 (0.9 m/s)
2004	Summer Olympics	Athens, Greece	7th (qf)	100 m	11.46 (0.2 m/s)
2004	Summer Olympics	Athens, Greece	4th	4 × 100 m relay	42.69 SB
2005	World Championships	Helsinki, Finland	4th	100 m	11.09 (1.3 m/s)
2005	World Championships	Helsinki, Finland	—	4 × 100 m relay	DNF (h)
2007	World Championships	Osaka, Japan	6th (sf)	100 m	11.22 (-0.3 m/s)
2008	Summer Olympics	Beijing, China	5th (sf)	100 m	11.22 (-0.7 m/s)
2009	World Championships	Berlin, Germany	7th	100 m	11.05 (0.1 m/s)
2009	World Championships	Berlin, Germany	2nd	4 × 100 m relay	42.29 SB
