= Carol Mokola =

Zambian sprinter

Personal information
- Nationality: Zambian
- Born: 1 January 1977 (age 48)

Sport
- Sport: Sprinting
- Event: 100 metres

Carol Mokola (born 1 January 1977) is a Zambian sprinter. She competed in the women's 100 metres at the 2004 Summer Olympics.
