= Tara Perry (athlete) =

Canadian sprinter (born 1974)

Personal information
- Nationality: Canadian
- Born: 20 November 1974 (age 51) New Westminster, British Columbia, Canada

Sport
- Sport: Sprinting
- Event: 200 metres
Medal record
Representing Canada
Summer Universiade
Bronze medal – third place	1997 Catania	4x100m relay

Tamara Constantia "Tara" Perry (born 20 November 1974) is a Canadian sprinter. She competed in the women's 200 metres at the 1996 Summer Olympics.
