= Abi Oyepitan =

British sprinter

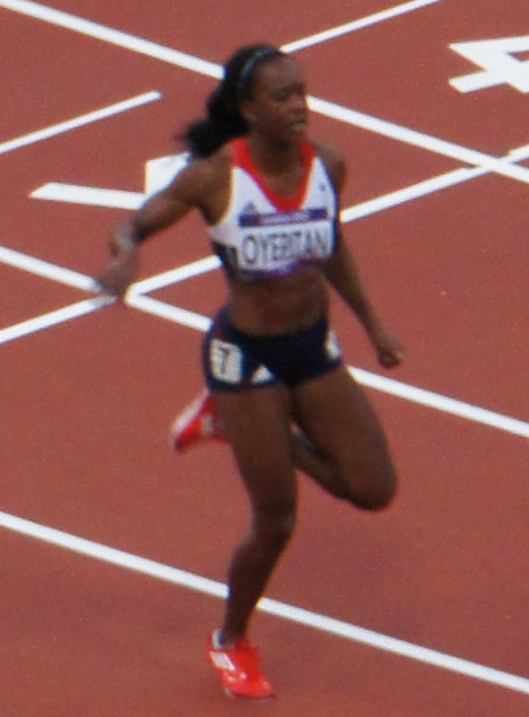
- Oyepitan at the 2012 Summer Olympics

Personal information
- Full name: Abiodun Adesola Oyepitan
- Nationality: British (English)
- Born: 30 December 1979 (age 46) London, England

Sport
- Sport: Women's athletics
- Events: 100 metres, 200 metres
Medal record
Representing England
Commonwealth Games
Gold medal – first place	2010 Delhi	4×100 m relay
Silver medal – second place	2010 Delhi	200 m
Bronze medal – third place	2002 Manchester	4×100 m relay
Representing Great Britain
Universiade
Gold medal – first place	2001 Beijing	100 m

Abiodun Adesola "Abi" Oyepitan (born 30 December 1979) is a British sprint athlete, who specialises in the 100 and 200 metres. She won the 100 m at the 2001 Summer Universiade and at the 2002 Commonwealth Games she took a bronze medal with the 4 × 100 m team. She became the first British female to reach an Olympic final in a sprint event since Kathy Cook. However, following her performance in the 2004 Athens Olympics, she suffered an injury, which all but brought her career to a halt.
She made a winning comeback in 2010, competing in the Diamond League and winning a silver medal for England at the Commonwealth Games in Delhi in the 200 m and a gold medal when she anchored the 4 × 100 m relay team to a win.

== Early career ==
Oyepitan was born in Westminster, London to Nigerian parents. Her name "Adesola" means "crowned with wealth" in Yoruba. She attended Bentley Wood High School. A member of the Shaftesbury Barnet Harriers, her first outing to a major athletics came at the 1998 World Junior Athletics Championships, where she finished fourth as part of the British 4 × 100 m relay team. She continued to perform well at the junior level, but her progress was interrupted in 2000 by an injury. She managed to bounce back the following year, with her comeback including a silver medal at the European under-23 Championships.

She was again part of the 4 × 100 m relay squad at the 2001 World Championships. Although the squad came away empty handed, they set the second fastest time ever by a British squad. She went on to take gold at the World Student Games that same year.

In 2002, Oyepitan represented the England Commonwealth Games team and made the 100 metres final of the 2002 Commonwealth Games in Manchester and improved on this in the relay by taking silver behind an Australian team. She also made the final of the European Athletics Championships, where Ekaterini Thanou took the gold.

She continued to improve and in 2003 broke her 200 m personal best in becoming the British 200 metres champion after winning the British AAA Championships title at the 2003 AAA Championships.

In 2004, at a meeting in Kalamata, Greece, in May, Oyepitan won the 100 m, then beat the reigning European Champion Muriel Hurtis in the 200 m. Then Oyepitan won the British 100 metres title at the 2004 AAA Championships.

== 2004 Athens Olympics ==
At the 2004 Summer Olympics Oyepitan did not make the 100 m final. Running in the faster of the two semi-finals, she finished fifth in her heat with a time of 11.18 s, that equalled LaTasha Colander's fourth placed time that saw her through in the second semi.

In the 200 m Oyepitan set a personal best in the first round, then comfortably progressed through round two and the semi-final, finishing second in both to Allyson Felix. She was passed early on in the final by eventual winner Veronica Campbell and eventually finished joint 7th, but happy with her overall performance.

Her appearance in the 200 m final was the first women's Olympic sprint final (100 + 200 m) to feature a Briton since Kathy Smallwood-Cook at the Los Angeles Olympics twenty years previously. She was also the only Briton to reach the sprint finals, all of the men failing for the first time in twenty-eight years, despite later going on to win the 4 × 100 m relay.

== After 2004 ==
Following the Olympics, a stress fracture injury caused her to miss the 2005 athletics season. She returned to the track in 2006, but the injury continued to limit her performances.

In 2010, she returned to take silver in the 200 m and a gold in the 4 × 100 m relay at the Commonwealth Games in Delhi.

== 2012 London Olympics ==
In 2012, Oyepitan came 2nd in the Oslo leg of the Diamond League 200 m Women in 22.71s. She then qualified for 2012 Olympics in London, where she competed in the 100 m and 200 m, making the semi-finals in both events.

In 2014, she announced her retirement.

== National titles ==
- AAAs (of England) National 100 metres Champion – 2004 (2nd in 2002, 2003)
- AAAs National 200 metres Champion – 2003 (2nd in 2004)

== International competitions ==
Year	Competition	Venue	Position	Event	Notes
Representing Great Britain
1998	World Junior Championships	Annecy, France	4th	4 × 100 m relay	44.65
1999	European U23 Championships	Gothenburg, Sweden	18th (h)	100m	25.00 (wind: -0.2 m/s)
2001	World Student Games	Beijing, China	1st	100 m	11.42
2001	European U23 Championships	Amsterdam, Netherlands	2nd	100m	11.58 (wind: -1.2 m/s)
2001	European U23 Championships	Amsterdam, Netherlands	1st	4 × 100 m relay	44.31
2004	Olympic Games	Athens, Greece	semi-final	100 m	11.18
2004	Olympic Games	Athens, Greece	7th	200 m	22.87
2012	Olympic Games	London, England	semi-final	100 m	11.36
2012	Olympic Games	London, England	semi-final	200 m	23.14
Representing England
2002	Commonwealth Games	Manchester, England	3rd	4×100 m relay	42.84
2010	Commonwealth Games	Delhi, India	2nd	200 m	23.26
2010	Commonwealth Games	Delhi, India	1st	4×100 m relay	44.19

=== Personal bests ===
Event	Best	Location	Date
60 metres	7.27 s	Glasgow, Scotland	24 January 2004
100 metres	11.17 s	Birmingham, England	23 July 2004
200 metres	22.50 s	Athens, Greece	23 August 2004

- All information taken from IAAF profile.
