= Kelli White =

American sprinter

Personal information
- Born: April 1, 1977 (age 49) Oakland, California, United States

Sport
- Sport: Track and field
Medal record
Representing United States
World Championships
Disqualified	2001 Edmonton	200 m
Disqualified	2001 Edmonton	4x100 m relay
Disqualified	2003 Paris	100 m
Disqualified	2003 Paris	200 m

Kelli White (born April 1, 1977) is an American former sprinter. She won two gold medals in the World Championships in Paris in 2003. However, on June 18, 2004, she was stripped of her medals, because she tested positive on a drug test. She retired from professional track in 2006.

== Early life and education ==
White's parents had both been sprinters. Her mother, Debbie Byfield, competed at the 1972 Summer Olympics. She attended James Logan High School in Union City, California, where she was on the track team. In 1994, when she was 17, a fellow student slashed her face with a knife; 300 stitches were required to close the wounds. White continued competing that season. Although she never won a state championship, at the time of her graduation in 1995 she held the top time in the 200 meters and the second best time in the 100 meters in the North Coast Section. She received a scholarship to the University of Tennessee, graduating in 1999.

== Doping case and work with USADA ==
After her positive test, White admitted guilt and testified before the Court of Arbitration for Sport (CAS). All her performances since December 15, 2000, were annulled. She was banned for two years by the United States Anti-Doping Agency, effective May 17, 2004.

Her doping was linked to the BALCO doping scandal. After returning from college to the San Francisco Bay Area in 2000, White's long-time coach, Remi Korchemny, introduced her to BALCO head Victor Conte. White has reported that Conte provided her with products that he identified as supplements and vitamins at first; when he informed her that one was a steroid, she declined to use it then and did not begin doping until after an injury-plagued, losing year in 2002. After being confronted with evidence seized from BALCO, she admitted using tetrahydrogestrinone (THG) and erythropoietin (EPO) in addition to modafinil.

White has since given lectures on drug abuse in sports around the world. She became the first athlete to work directly with the United States Anti-Doping Agency to help it understand the system and culture of doping at the elite competition level.

While banned from competition, she has taught at track clinics at James Logan High. She announced her retirement in May 2006.

== See also ==
- List of doping cases in athletics
