= Shani Anderson =

English sprinter (born 1975)

Personal information
- Nationality: British/Vincentian
- Born: 7 August 1975 (age 51) St Vincent
- Height: 176 cm (5 ft 9 in)
- Weight: 64 kg (141 lb)

Sport
- Sport: Athletics
- Event: sprints
- Club: Shaftesbury Barnet Harriers
Medal record
Representing England
Commonwealth Games
Bronze medal – third place	2002 Manchester	4x100 m relay

Shani Anderson (born 7 August 1975) is a British/Vincentian former sprinter who competed at the 2000 Summer Olympics.

== Biography ==
Anderson was born in St Vincent but was educated in Dulwich, South London at James Allen's Girls' School and was a resident of Catford, London.

Anderson finished third three times at the AAA Championships, behind Jamaican Evadnie McKenzie in the 100 metres event at the 1997 AAA Championships, third behind Joice Maduaka in the 200 metres at the 1999 AAA Championships and third behind Sarah Wilhelmy at the 2000 AAA Championships.

At the 2000 Olympic Games in Sydney, Anderson represented Great Britain in the 100 metres and 4×100 metres events.

After a second place finish behind Sarah Reilly at the 2001 AAAs, she finally became the British 200 metres champion after winning the AAA Championships title at the 2002 AAA Championships.

Shani now coaches athletics from club to Olympic level and started her own personal training company, Anderson Fitness Consultants. She has a personal training studio at The Armitage on Great Portland Street where she trains clients and she also runs corporate health & wellbeing events and programmes.
