= Lauren Hewitt =

Australian sprinter (born 1978)

Medal record

Commonwealth Games
Gold medal – first place	1998 Kuala Lumpur	4×100 metres
Gold medal – first place	2002 Manchester	4×400 metres
Bronze medal – third place	1998 Kuala Lumpur	200 metres
Bronze medal – third place	2002 Manchester	200 metres
Bronze medal – third place	2006 Melbourne	4×100 metres

World Junior Championships
Silver medal – second place	1996 Sydney	200 Metres

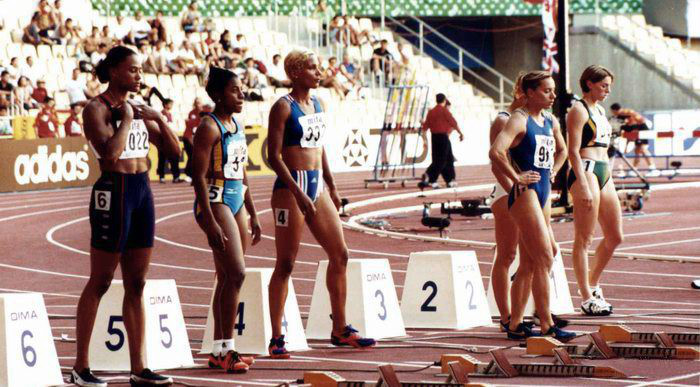
Tgalindo-100sevilla99.jpg

Lauren Katherine Hewitt (born 25 November 1978) is a track and field sprinter from Australia. She competed in three consecutive Summer Olympics, starting in 1996, and won the bronze medal in the women's 200 metres at the 1998 Commonwealth Games.

In 1998 Lauren won the Commonwealth 100/200 Trials in Sydney.

In 1999 Lauren was Australian 100/200 metre champion.

Then in 2000 Lauren won the Olympic 100 trials, defeating Melinda Gainsford Taylor in Sydney, and finished 2nd in the 200m.

She won further Australian 100/200 titles in 2001, 2002, and 200 in 2004, and 2005.
