= Joice Maduaka =

British sprinter (born 1973)

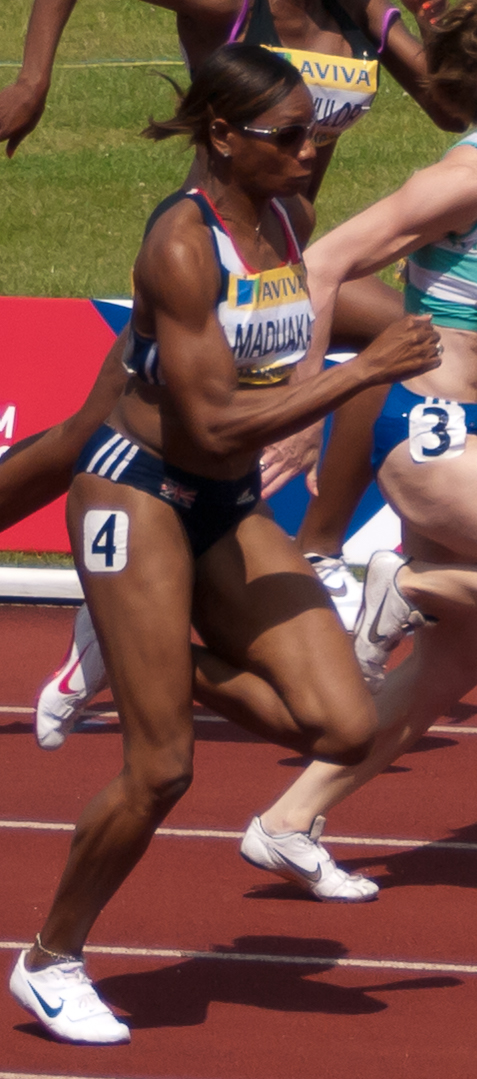
- Joice Maduaka in 2010

Personal information
- Born: 30 September 1973 (age 53) London, England
- Height: 1.72 m (5 ft 8 in)
- Weight: 63 kg (9 st 13 lb; 139 lb)

Sport
- Country: Great Britain; England
- Sport: Women's athletics
- Event: 100 metres
- Club: Woodford Green with Essex Ladies
- Turned pro: 1997

Achievements and titles
- Highest world ranking: 100 m: 18 (2003); 200 m: 16 (2003)
- Personal bests: 100 m 11.23; 200 m 22.83
Medal record
Representing England
Commonwealth Games
Bronze medal – third place	1998 Kuala Lumpur	4x100m relay
Bronze medal – third place	2002 Manchester	4x100m relay

Amuilka Joy (Joice) Maduaka (born 30 September 1973) is a British former track and field athlete, who competed over the 100, 200 and occasionally 400 metres. She holds the record for winning the most medals of any athlete at the British Athletics Championships, with 22 medals, including being the 100 metres champion six times, and the 200 metres champion a further three times.

== Athletics career ==
Maduaka finished third behind Catherine Murphy in the 200 metres event at the 1995 AAA Championships but it was not until 1998 that she returned to the podium becoming the British 100 metres champion after winning the British AAA Championships title at the 1998 AAA Championships. Later that September, she represented England and won a bronze medal in the 4 x 100 metres relay event, at the 1998 Commonwealth Games in Kuala Lumpur, Malaysia.

In 1999, Maduaka won both the 100 and 200 titles at the 1999 AAA Championships. This led to selection for the Great Britain team in the 2000 Summer Olympics.

Maduaka regained the 100 metres AAA title in 2002, followed by a second Commonwealth Games appearance when she was selected to represent England at the 2002 Commonwealth Games in Manchester, which resulted in a second bronze medal in the 4 x 100 metres relay.

Another 100 metres AAA title was added in 2003 and the 200 metres title in 2004. At the 2004 Olympic Games in Athens, Maduaka represented Great Britain again in the 200 metres event.

There was a general improvement in the overall standard of women's sprinting in Britain and Maduaka was faced with domestic challenges from athletes such as Abi Oyepitan. In 2006, Maduaka was not selected for the Commonwealth Games, but instead ran in the World Indoor Athletics Championships. During 2006, she burst back onto the scene, setting new personal bests.

She went on to represent Great Britain at the 2006 European Championships in Athletics, finishing 4th in the final of the 100 m and finishing 2nd in the 4 × 100 m relay and became the British champion again, over 100 m and 200 m at the 2006 AAA Championships, beating her opposition by a considerable margin.

At the end of the year, Maduaka was ranked as the fastest British athlete over 100 m and the second fastest over 200 m. At the 2007 British Athletics Championships she failed to defend her 100 m crown, finishing third behind Jeanette Kwakye, and also had to pull out of the final of the 200 m, despite winning her heat very convincingly, due to illness. The 200 m was also won by Kwakye.

At the 2007 European Cup first division, Maduaka finished 2nd in the individual 100 m, 1st in the 200 m and anchored the British team home to first place in the relay, winning 23 points altogether, for her team. This is the most any British athlete has ever done for their country at these championships.

Maduaka was later chosen to represent her country at the 2007 World Championships in Athletics. She was excluded from the 100 m list, as Montell Douglas was the only British athlete who had obtained the A-standard whilst, Laura Turner had been selected as an improving athlete. Maduaka and Jeanette Kwakye were to be the only British representatives in the 200 m. However, Turner went on to achieve the A standard for the 100 m, meaning that GBR were permitted another athlete in the event. The committee chose Kwakye, and then replaced her in the 200 m with Emily Freeman.

== Controversy ==
In late 2006, Maduaka and the rest of the British Women's Relay Team, represented the Europe team at the 2006 World Athletics Cup. However, the officials had placed the Europe team and the USA team in the wrong lanes, so when it came to pass the baton, they would have been passing them to the opposition. Team USA passed the batons, but team GBR (Europe) were unsure, but in the end did make a change. Both teams finished. USA was disqualified, but Europe wasn't. The race was not rerun, despite being rescheduled.

== Personal bests ==
100 metres — 11.23 At Manchester on 15 July 2006
200 metres — 22.83 At Birmingham on 25 July 1999

== Major championships ==
=== Olympic Games ===
Athens 2004

- Women's 200 m: Round 1 – 23.15, Round 2 – 23.30

Sydney 2000

- Women's 100 m: Round 1 – 11.51
- Women's 200 m: Round 1 – 23.36, Round 2 – 23.57
- Women's 4 × 100 m Relay: Round 1 – 43.26, Semi-final – 43.19

=== World Championships ===
Osaka 2007

- Women's 200 m: Round 1 – 23.22, Round 2 – 23.62
- Women's 4 × 100 m Relay: Round 1 – 42.82 (SB), Final – 42.87 (4th)

Paris 2003

- Women's 100 m: Round 1 – 11.31, Round 2 – 11.29, Semi-final – 11.40
- Women's 200 m: Round 1 – 23.11, Round 2 – 23.50

Seville 1999

- Women's 100 m: Round 1 – 11.43, Round 2 – 11.28
- Women's 200 m: Round 1 – 23.27, Round 2 – 23.33
- Women's 4 × 100 m Relay: Round 1 – 43.31, Final – 43.52 (8th)
