= 2008 African Championships in Athletics – Women's 200 metres =

The women's 200 metres event at the 2008 African Championships in Athletics was held at the Addis Ababa Stadium on May 3–4.

== Medalists ==
Gold	Silver	Bronze
Isabel le Roux; South Africa	Kadiatou Camara; Mali	Oludamola Osayomi; Nigeria

== Results ==
=== Heats ===
Qualification: First 4 of each heat (Q) and the next 4 fastest (q) qualified for the semifinals.

Wind: Heat 1: -3.0 m/s, Heat 2: -1.4 m/s, Heat 3: -2.9 m/s, Heat 4: -1.8 m/s, Heat 5: -1.8 m/s

Rank	Heat	Name	Nationality	Time	Notes
1	3	Isabel Le Roux	South Africa	23.69	Q
2	5	Kadiatou Camara	Mali	23.82	Q
3	3	Vida Anim	Ghana	23.86	Q
4	3	Helen Emedolu	Nigeria	24.01	Q
5	2	Gifty Addy	Ghana	24.07	Q
6	1	Myriam Léonie Mani	Cameroon	24.12	Q
7	4	Geraldine Pillay	South Africa	24.20	Q
8	1	Oludamola Osayomi	Nigeria	24.35	Q
9	2	Joy Sakari	Kenya	24.45	Q
10	4	Delphine Atangana	Cameroon	24.55	Q
11	2	Susan Akene	Nigeria	24.74	Q
12	5	Amandine Allou Affoué	Ivory Coast	24.77	Q
13	5	Elizabeth Amolofo	Ghana	24.82	Q
14	5	Charlotte Mebenga Amombo	Cameroon	24.97	Q
15	4	Leaynet Alemu	Ethiopia	25.18	Q
16	2	Lorène Bazolo	Republic of the Congo	25.35	Q
17	3	Atikilt Wobshet	Ethiopia	25.61	Q
18	1	Souliatou Saka	Benin	25.67	Q
19	2	Betelhem Shewatatek	Ethiopia	25.68	q
20	4	Fatoumata Coulibaly	Ivory Coast	25.70	Q
21	1	Goitsemodimo Dikinya	Botswana	25.86	Q
22	5	Kensa Sylla	Guinea	26.15	q
23	1	Hinikissia Albertine Ndikert	Chad	26.36	q
24	2	Judith Djaman	Ivory Coast	26.40	q
25	4	Tumelano Amuchilane	Botswana	26.58	
26	3	Blague Neloumta	Chad	26.68	
27	4	Mariama Bah	Guinea	26.76	
28	3	Sophie Kanakuzé	Rwanda	27.75	
29	5	Fathia Ali Bourrale	Djibouti	28.01	NR
30	5	Fowzia Abdikarin Sheikh	Somalia	31.76	
	1	Aminata Diouf	Senegal	DNS	
	1	Kou Luogon	Liberia	DNS	
	2	Justine Bayigga	Uganda	DNS	
	3	Ruddy Zang Milama	Gabon	DNS	
	4	Elisa Cossa	Mozambique	DNS	
	5	Ene Franca Idoko	Nigeria	DNS	

=== Semifinals ===
Qualification: First 2 of each semifinal (Q) and the next 2 fastest (q) qualified for the final.

Wind: Heat 1: -1.7 m/s, Heat 2: -2.9 m/s, Heat 3: -1.6 m/s

Rank	Heat	Name	Nationality	Time	Notes
1	3	Kadiatou Camara	Mali	22.87	Q, NR
2	2	Oludamola Osayomi	Nigeria	23.47	Q
3	2	Isabel Le Roux	South Africa	23.52	Q
4	3	Geraldine Pillay	South Africa	23.65	Q
5	3	Helen Emedolu	Nigeria	23.72	q
6	2	Vida Anim	Ghana	23.76	q
7	1	Myriam Léonie Mani	Cameroon	23.86	Q
8	1	Joy Sakari	Kenya	23.95	Q
9	3	Delphine Atangana	Cameroon	23.98	
10	1	Gifty Addy	Ghana	24.12	
11	2	Amandine Allou Affoué	Ivory Coast	24.18	
12	1	Susan Akene	Nigeria	24.27	
13	3	Elizabeth Amolofo	Ghana	24.44	
14	2	Charlotte Mebenga Amombo	Cameroon	25.03	
15	3	Lorène Bazolo	Republic of the Congo	25.23	
16	3	Betelhem Shewatatek	Ethiopia	25.27	
17	1	Atikilt Wobshet	Ethiopia	25.29	
18	2	Leaynet Alemu	Ethiopia	25.42	
19	1	Souliatou Saka	Benin	25.62	
20	2	Goitsemodimo Dikinya	Botswana	25.68	
21	1	Fatoumata Coulibaly	Ivory Coast	25.78	
22	1	Kensa Sylla	Guinea	26.01	
23	2	Hinikissia Albertine Ndikert	Chad	26.41	
24	3	Judith Djaman	Ivory Coast	26.43	

=== Final ===
Wind: +1.5 m/s

Rank	Lane	Name	Nationality	Time	Notes
1st place, gold medalist(s)	5	Isabel Le Roux	South Africa	22.69	
2nd place, silver medalist(s)	4	Kadiatou Camara	Mali	22.70	NR
3rd place, bronze medalist(s)	6	Oludamola Osayomi	Nigeria	22.83	
4	7	Geraldine Pillay	South Africa	23.40	
5	3	Myriam Léonie Mani	Cameroon	23.55	
6	8	Joy Sakari	Kenya	23.78	
	2	Vida Anim	Ghana	DNS	
	1	Helen Emedolu	Nigeria	DNS	
