= Athletics at the 2007 All-Africa Games – Women's 200 metres =

The women's 200 metres at the 2007 All-Africa Games were held on July 21–22.

== Medalists ==
Gold	Silver	Bronze
Damola Osayomi; Nigeria	Vida Anim; Ghana	Amandine Allou Affoue; Ivory Coast

== Results ==
=== Heats ===
Qualification: First 3 of each heat (Q) and the next 4 fastest (q) qualified for the semifinals.

Wind:
Heat 1: +2.4 m/s, Heat 2: -1.6 m/s, Heat 3: -1.3 m/s, Heat 4: -0.5 m/s

Rank	Heat	Name	Nationality	Time	Notes
1	1	Damola Osayomi	Nigeria	23.15	Q
2	1	Constance Mkenku	South Africa	23.57	Q
2	3	Vida Anim	Ghana	23.57	Q
4	1	Amantle Montsho	Botswana	23.76	Q
5	3	Amandine Allou Affoue	Ivory Coast	23.82	Q
6	4	Louise Ayetotche	Ivory Coast	23.85	Q
7	2	Kadiatou Camara	Mali	23.87	Q
8	1	Aminata Diouf	Senegal	23.89	q
9	1	Elizabeth Amolofo	Ghana	24.06	q
10	2	Cynthia Niako	Ivory Coast	24.15	Q
11	2	Myriam Leonie Mani	Cameroon	24.16	Q
12	2	Sandra Chimwanza	Zimbabwe	24.24	q
12	4	Esther Dankwah	Ghana	24.24	Q
14	2	Cindy Stewart	South Africa	24.32	q
15	2	Elisa Cossa	Mozambique	24.42	
16	4	Justine Bayiga	Uganda	24.55	Q
17	2	Gladys Nwaubani	Nigeria	24.59	
18	3	Nobuhle Ncube	Zimbabwe	24.75	Q
19	3	Ruddy Zang Milama	Gabon	24.84	
20	3	Nadège Lucie Feumba	Cameroon	24.87	
21	2	Nadia Remaoune	Algeria	25.37	
22	4	Kadidja Ahmat	Chad	26.03	
23	3	Alice Tiklo	Liberia	26.32	
24	4	Nsele Lukaku	Democratic Republic of the Congo	26.82	
25	1	Teresa Sina	Angola	26.96	
	1	Fabienne Feraez	Benin	DNS	
	1	Joy Sakari	Kenya	DNS	
	3	Francisca Idoko	Nigeria	DNS	
	4	Delphine Atangana	Cameroon	DNS	
	4	Racheal Nachula	Zambia	DNS	

=== Semifinals ===
Qualification: First 4 of each semifinal qualified (Q) directly for the final.

Wind:
Heat 1: +1.8 m/s, Heat 2: -0.6 m/s

Rank	Heat	Name	Nationality	Time	Notes
1	1	Damola Osayomi	Nigeria	23.23	Q
2	1	Kadiatou Camara	Mali	23.34	Q
3	2	Vida Anim	Ghana	23.36	Q
4	2	Amandine Allou Affoue	Ivory Coast	23.48	Q
5	2	Constance Mkenku	South Africa	23.56	Q
6	2	Louise Ayetotche	Ivory Coast	23.59	Q
7	1	Amantle Montsho	Botswana	23.66	Q
8	2	Myriam Leonie Mani	Cameroon	23.77	
9	1	Cindy Stewart	South Africa	23.83	Q
10	1	Cynthia Niako	Ivory Coast	23.86	
11	1	Aminata Diouf	Senegal	23.92	
12	2	Elizabeth Amolofo	Ghana	24.12	
13	2	Sandra Chimwanza	Zimbabwe	24.20	
14	1	Esther Dankwah	Ghana	24.24	
15	2	Justine Bayiga	Uganda	24.28	
16	1	Nobuhle Ncube	Zimbabwe	24.62	

=== Final ===
Wind: -0.8 m/s

Rank	Name	Nationality	Time	Notes
1st place, gold medalist(s)	Damola Osayomi	Nigeria	23.21	
2nd place, silver medalist(s)	Vida Anim	Ghana	23.29	
3rd place, bronze medalist(s)	Amandine Allou Affoue	Ivory Coast	23.44	
4	Kadiatou Camara	Mali	23.48	
5	Amantle Montsho	Botswana	23.71	
6	Constance Mkenku	South Africa	23.74	
7	Louise Ayetotche	Ivory Coast	23.88	
8	Cindy Stewart	South Africa	24.04	
