= Athletics at the 2007 All-Africa Games – Women's 100 metres =

The women's 100 metres at the 2007 All-Africa Games were held on July 18–19.

== Medalists ==
Gold	Silver	Bronze
Damola Osayomi; Nigeria	Constance Mkenku; South Africa	Vida Anim; Ghana

== Results ==
=== Heats ===
Qualification: First 3 of each heat (Q) and the next 4 fastest (q) qualified for the semifinals.

Wind:
Heat 1: 0.0 m/s, Heat 2: +1.0 m/s, Heat 3: +0.8 m/s, Heat 4: -1.4 m/s

Rank	Heat	Name	Nationality	Time	Notes
1	4	Francisca Idoko	Nigeria	11.29	Q
2	1	Constance Mkenku	South Africa	11.40	Q
2	3	Vida Anim	Ghana	11.40	Q
4	3	Delphine Atangana	Cameroon	11.49	Q
5	1	Damola Osayomi	Nigeria	11.53	Q
6	4	Myriam Leonie Mani	Cameroon	11.54	Q
7	1	Amandine Allou Affoue	Ivory Coast	11.62	Q
8	4	Louise Ayétotché	Ivory Coast	11.63	Q
9	2	Cynthia Niako	Ivory Coast	11.67	Q
10	2	Gloria Kemasuode	Nigeria	11.67	Q
11	4	Esther Dankwah	Ghana	11.70	q
12	2	Aminata Diouf	Senegal	11.77	Q
13	3	Souheir Bouali	Algeria	11.79	Q
14	1	Gifty Addy	Ghana	11.82	q
15	1	Ruddy Zang Milama	Gabon	11.83	q
16	2	Joy Sakari	Kenya	11.89	q
17	2	Sergine Kouanga	Cameroon	11.90	
18	2	Cindy Stewart	South Africa	11.91	
19	4	Sarah Tondé	Burkina Faso	12.05	
20	4	Maty Salame	Senegal	12.05	
21	3	Nobuhle Ncube	Zimbabwe	12.07	
22	3	Amatercia Quiue	Mozambique	12.08	
23	1	Sandra Chimwanza	Zimbabwe	12.16	
24	1	Lucie Mendy	Senegal	12.30	
25	2	Wubshet Atkilt	Ethiopia	12.39	
26	2	Alice Tiklo	Liberia	12.54	
27	1	Kadidja Ahmat	Chad	12.67	
28	3	Melina Kazabanga	Central African Republic	12.86	
29	4	Amili Botowa Mungu	Democratic Republic of the Congo	12.93	
30	3	Teresa Sina	Angola	13.02	

=== Semifinals ===
Qualification: First 4 of each semifinal qualified (Q) directly for the final.

Wind:
Heat 1: +0.6 m/s, Heat 2: +0.5 m/s

Rank	Heat	Name	Nationality	Time	Notes
1	1	Damola Osayomi	Nigeria	11.21	Q
2	1	Francisca Idoko	Nigeria	11.28	Q
3	2	Constance Mkenku	South Africa	11.34	Q
4	1	Vida Anim	Ghana	11.40	Q
5	1	Amandine Allou Affoue	Ivory Coast	11.43	Q
6	1	Myriam Leonie Mani	Cameroon	11.44	
7	2	Delphine Atangana	Cameroon	11.54	Q
8	2	Gloria Kemasuode	Nigeria	11.58	Q
9	2	Cynthia Niako	Ivory Coast	11.63	Q
10	1	Aminata Diouf	Senegal	11.67	
11	2	Louise Ayétotché	Ivory Coast	11.70	
12	1	Ruddy Zang Milama	Gabon	11.81	
13	1	Gifty Addy	Ghana	11.85	
14	2	Joy Sakari	Kenya	11.92	
15	2	Esther Dankwah	Ghana	11.92	
16	2	Souheir Bouali	Algeria	12.77	

=== Final ===
Wind: +0.6 m/s

Rank	Name	Nationality	Time	Notes
1st place, gold medalist(s)	Damola Osayomi	Nigeria	11.20	
2nd place, silver medalist(s)	Constance Mkenku	South Africa	11.27	
3rd place, bronze medalist(s)	Vida Anim	Ghana	11.33	
4	Francisca Idoko	Nigeria	11.46	
5	Amandine Allou Affoue	Ivory Coast	11.52	
6	Gloria Kemasuode	Nigeria	11.53	
7	Delphine Atangana	Cameroon	11.53	
8	Cynthia Niako	Ivory Coast	11.59	
