= Athletics at the 2007 All-Africa Games – Women's 4 × 100 metres relay =

The women's 4 x 100 metres relay at the 2007 All-Africa Games was held on July 19–20.

== Medalists ==
Gold	Silver	Bronze
Ghana; Mariama Salifu; Esther Dankwah; Gifty Addy; Vida Anim	Nigeria; Gladys Nwabani; Endurance Ojokolo; Francisca Idoko; Damola Osayomi	Ivory Coast; Brali Judith Djaman; Louise Ayétotché; Cynthia Niako; Amandine Allou Affoue

== Results ==
=== Heats ===
Qualification: First 3 teams of each heat (Q) plus the next 2 fastest (q) qualified for the final.

Rank	Heat	Nation	Athletes	Time	Notes
1	1	Ghana	Mariama Salifu, Esther Dankwah, Gifty Addy, Vida Anim	44.31	Q
2	1	Nigeria	Gladys Nwabani, Endurance Ojokolo, Francisca Idoko, Damola Osayomi	44.33	Q
3	2	Ivory Coast	Brali Judith Djaman, Louise Ayétotché, Cynthia Niako, Amandine Allou Affoue	44.78	Q
4	1	Cameroon	Sergine Kouanga, Nadege Feumba, Joséphine Mbarga-Bikié, Delphine Atangana	45.02	Q
5	2	Zimbabwe	Tamla Denise Pietersen, Sandra Chimwaza, Sophia Chirairo, Nobuhle Ncube	46.08	Q
6	2	Kenya	Joy Sakari, Ziporah Ratemo, Florence Wasike, Elisabeth Muthoka	46.19	Q
7	1	Senegal	Gnima Faye, Fatou Bintou Fall, Maty Salame, Aminata Diouf	46.46	q
	1	Algeria		DNF	
	2	Burkina Faso		DNF	

=== Final ===
Rank	Nation	Athletes	Time	Notes
1st place, gold medalist(s)	Ghana	Mariama Salifu, Esther Dankwah, Gifty Addy, Vida Anim	43.84	
2nd place, silver medalist(s)	Nigeria	Gladys Nwabani, Endurance Ojokolo, Francisca Idoko, Damola Osayomi	43.85	
3rd place, bronze medalist(s)	Ivory Coast	Brali Judith Djaman, Louise Ayétotché, Cynthia Niako, Amandine Allou Affoue	44.48	
4	Senegal	Gnima Faye, Fatou Bintou Fall, Maty Salame, Aminata Diouf	45.26	
5	Zimbabwe	Tamla Denise Pietersen, Sandra Chimwaza, Sophia Chirairo, Nobuhle Ncube	45.84	
6	Kenya	Joy Sakari, Ziporah Ratemo, Florence Wasike, Elisabeth Muthoka	46.24	
	Cameroon	Sergine Kouanga, Nadege Feumba, Joséphine Mbarga-Bikié, Delphine Atangana	DNF	
