= 2006 African Championships in Athletics – Women's 100 metres =

African Championships in Athletics

The women's 100 metres event at the 2006 African Championships in Athletics was held at the Stade Germain Comarmond on August 9–10.

== Medalists ==
Gold	Silver	Bronze
Vida Anim; Ghana	Geraldine Pillay; South Africa	Endurance Ojokolo; Nigeria

== Results ==
=== Heats ===
Wind: Heat 1: -3.6 m/s, Heat 2: -2.9 m/s, Heat 3: -3.4 m/s

Rank	Heat	Name	Nationality	Time	Notes
1	2	Vida Anim	Ghana	11.64	Q
2	2	Endurance Ojokolo	Nigeria	11.82	Q
3	1	Geraldine Pillay	South Africa	11.87	Q
4	3	Gloria Kemasuode	Nigeria	11.97	Q
5	2	Kadiatou Camara	Mali	12.00	q
6	2	Louise Ayétotché	Ivory Coast	12.03	q
7	1	Amandine Allou Affoue	Ivory Coast	12.04	Q
8	3	Myriam Léonie Mani	Cameroon	12.06	Q
9	2	Sarah Tondé	Burkina Faso	12.22	
10	3	Cynthia Evelyne Niako	Ivory Coast	12.29	
11	3	Esther Dankwah	Ghana	12.35	
12	1	Lucie Mendy	Senegal	12.40	
13	2	Aneterica Quive	Mozambique	12.52	
14	3	Justine Bayigga	Uganda	12.56	
15	3	Elisa Cossa	Mozambique	12.69	
16	1	Kibouanga	Republic of the Congo	12.76	
17	1	Mary Jane Vincent	Mauritius	12.83	
18	1	Flings Owusu-Agyapong	Ghana	12.85	
19	1	Esther Solange Ndoumbe	Cameroon	12.85	
20	2	Atikilt Wubshet	Ethiopia	13.04	
	3	Joanna Hoareau	Seychelles	DQ	
	1	Ene Franca Idoko	Nigeria	DNS	
	2	Aminata Diouf	Senegal	DNS	
	3	Khadidja Ahmat	Chad	DNS	

=== Final ===
Wind: -3.8 m/s

Rank	Lane	Name	Nationality	Time	Notes
1st place, gold medalist(s)	4	Vida Anim	Ghana	11.58	
2nd place, silver medalist(s)	3	Geraldine Pillay	South Africa	11.67	
3rd place, bronze medalist(s)	6	Endurance Ojokolo	Nigeria	11.95	
4	1	Amandine Allou Affoue	Ivory Coast	12.03	
5	2	Myriam Léonie Mani	Cameroon	12.04	
6	7	Kadiatou Camara	Mali	12.10	
7	5	Gloria Kemasuode	Nigeria	12.14	
8	8	Louise Ayétotché	Ivory Coast	12.18	
