= 2006 African Championships in Athletics – Women's 200 metres =

The women's 200 metres event at the 2006 African Championships in Athletics was held at the Stade Germain Comarmond on August 12–13.

== Medalists ==
| Gold | Silver | Bronze |
|---|---|---|
| Vida Anim; Ghana | Geraldine Pillay; South Africa | Fabienne Feraez; Benin |

== Results ==
=== Heats ===
Wind: Heat 1: -3.9 m/s, Heat 2: -1.6 m/s, Heat 3: -2.7 m/s

| Rank | Heat | Name | Nationality | Time | Notes |
|---|---|---|---|---|---|
| 1 | 2 | Vida Anim | Ghana | 23.34 | Q |
| 2 | 2 | Kadiatou Camara | Mali | 23.68 | Q |
| 3 | 3 | Fabienne Feraez | Benin | 23.77 | Q |
| 4 | 1 | Louise Ayétotché | Ivory Coast | 23.84 | Q |
| 5 | 2 | Amandine Allou Affoue | Ivory Coast | 23.88 | q |
| 6 | 1 | Geraldine Pillay | South Africa | 23.93 | Q |
| 7 | 3 | Cynthia Niako | Ivory Coast | 24.11 | Q |
| 8 | 3 | Myriam Léonie Mani | Cameroon | 24.37 | q |
| 9 | 3 | Gloria Kemasuode | Nigeria | 24.38 | |
| 10 | 1 | Elizabeth Amolofo | Ghana | 24.66 | |
| 10 | 3 | Gifty Addy | Ghana | 24.66 | |
| 12 | 3 | Elisa Cossa | Mozambique | 25.29 | |
| 13 | 1 | Justine Bayigga | Uganda | 25.39 | |
| 14 | 1 | Mary Jane Vincent | Mauritius | 26.06 | |
| 15 | 2 | Joanna Hoareau | Seychelles | 26.13 | |
| 16 | 3 | Atikilt Wubshet | Ethiopia | 26.23 | |
| 17 | 1 | Nomvula Dlamini | Swaziland | 27.48 | |
| | 2 | Nadège Essama Foe | Cameroon | DNF | |
| | 1 | Joséphine Mbarga-Bikié | Cameroon | DNS | |
| | 2 | Sarah Bona | Sierra Leone | DNS | |

=== Final ===
Wind: -2.6 m/s

| Rank | Lane | Name | Nationality | Time | Notes |
|---|---|---|---|---|---|
| 1st place, gold medalist(s) | 4 | Vida Anim | Ghana | 22.90 | |
| 2nd place, silver medalist(s) | 7 | Geraldine Pillay | South Africa | 23.11 | |
| 3rd place, bronze medalist(s) | 6 | Fabienne Feraez | Benin | 23.15 | |
| 4 | 3 | Kadiatou Camara | Mali | 23.47 | |
| 5 | 5 | Louise Ayétotché | Ivory Coast | 23.53 | |
| 6 | 2 | Amandine Allou Affoue | Ivory Coast | 23.58 | |
| 7 | 1 | Cynthia Niako | Ivory Coast | 23.90 | |
| 8 | 8 | Myriam Léonie Mani | Cameroon | 24.12 | |
