= Athletics at the 2003 All-Africa Games – Women's 200 metres =

The women's 200 metres at the 2003 All-Africa Games were held on October 13–14.

== Medalists ==
Gold	Silver	Bronze
Mary Onyali-Omagbemi; Nigeria (NGR)	Vida Anim; Ghana (GHA)	Estie Wittstock; South Africa (RSA)

== Results ==
=== Heats ===
Qualification: First 2 of each heat (Q) and the next 2 fastest (q) qualified for the semifinal.

Wind:
Heat 1: -0.5 m/s, Heat 2: +0.4 m/s, Heat 3: 0.0 m/s

Rank	Heat	Name	Nationality	Time	Notes
1	1	Mary Onyali-Omagbemi	Nigeria	22.87	Q
2	2	Vida Anim	Ghana	23.15	Q
3	1	Delphine Atangana	Cameroon	23.27	Q
4	1	Estie Wittstock	South Africa	23.34	q
4	3	Geraldine Pillay	South Africa	23.34	Q
6	1	Louise Ayétotché	Ivory Coast	23.38	q
7	2	Joan Uduak Ekah	Nigeria	23.43	Q
8	3	Fabienne Feraez	Benin	23.46	Q
9	3	Amandine Allou Affoue	Ivory Coast	23.70	
10	3	Winneth Dube	Zimbabwe	23.79	
11	3	Damola Osayomi	Nigeria	23.97	
12	1	Aïda Diop	Senegal	24.27	
13	2	Justine Bayiga	Uganda	24.55	
14	3	Sarah Bona	Sierra Leone	24.81	
15	1	Veronica Wabukawo	Uganda	24.93	
16	2	Michelle Banga Moundzoula	Republic of the Congo	25.17	
17	1	Marang Kinteh	Gambia	26.00	
18	1	Bridget Gbanie	Sierra Leone	26.45	
19	2	Hawanatu Bangura	Sierra Leone	27.88	
	3	Shewit Tesfagebriel	Eritrea	DNF	
	2	M'Mah Touré	Guinea	DNS	
	2	Elisa Cossa	Mozambique	DNS	
	2	Aminata Diouf	Senegal	DNS	
	3	Ivonne Dhato	Chad	DNS	

=== Final ===
Wind: -0.3 m/s

Rank	Name	Nationality	Time	Notes
1st place, gold medalist(s)	Mary Onyali-Omagbemi	Nigeria	23.09	
2nd place, silver medalist(s)	Vida Anim	Ghana	23.17	
3rd place, bronze medalist(s)	Estie Wittstock	South Africa	23.46	
4	Delphine Atangana	Cameroon	23.50	
5	Geraldine Pillay	South Africa	23.73	
6	Louise Ayétotché	Ivory Coast	23.76	
7	Joan Uduak Ekah	Nigeria	23.84	
8	Fabienne Feraez	Benin	23.89	
