= 2008 African Championships in Athletics – Women's 100 metres =

The women's 100 metres event at the 2008 African Championships in Athletics was held at the Addis Ababa Stadium on April 30–May 1.

== Medalists ==
Gold	Silver	Bronze
Oludamola Osayomi; Nigeria	Vida Anim; Ghana	Delphine Atangana; Cameroon

== Results ==
=== Heats ===
Qualification: First 3 of each heat (Q) and the next 4 fastest (q) qualified for the semifinals.

Wind: Heat 1: -2.0 m/s, Heat 2: -0.7 m/s, Heat 3: -0.7 m/s, Heat 4: -3.1 m/s

Rank	Heat	Name	Nationality	Time	Notes
1	3	Vida Anim	Ghana	11.55	Q
2	1	Oludamola Osayomi	Nigeria	11.56	Q
3	4	Aminata Diouf	Senegal	11.66	Q
4	1	Geraldine Pillay	South Africa	11.69	Q
4	2	Myriam Léonie Mani	Cameroon	11.69	Q
4	3	Gloria Kemasuode	Nigeria	11.69	Q
7	1	Delphine Atangana	Cameroon	11.71	Q
8	4	Sergine Kouanga	Cameroon	11.73	Q
9	4	Ene Franca Idoko	Nigeria	11.78	Q
10	1	Gifty Addy	Ghana	11.81	q
11	4	Amandine Allou Affoué	Ivory Coast	11.83	q
12	2	Esther Dankwah	Ghana	11.90	Q
13	2	Joy Sakari	Kenya	11.96	Q
14	3	Sahara Tonde	Burkina Faso	12.29	Q
15	2	Atikilt Wobshet	Ethiopia	12.36	q, NR
16	3	Leaynet Alemu	Ethiopia	12.40	q
17	3	Fatou Tiyana	Gambia	12.56	
18	1	Lorène Bazolo	Republic of the Congo	12.58	
19	2	Anatercia Quive	Mozambique	12.60	
20	4	Fadoua Adili	Morocco	12.69	
21	1	Betelhem Shewatatek	Ethiopia	12.71	
22	1	Mariama Bah	Guinea	12.94	
23	4	Sophie Kanakuzé	Rwanda	13.26	
24	4	Fathia Ali Bourrale	Djibouti	13.45	NR
25	1	Samia Yusuf Omar	Somalia	15.64	
26	2	Hani Mahied Aiman	Somalia	15.72	
	2	Hinikissia Albertine Ndikert	Chad	DNS	
	2	Sandra Chimwaza	Zimbabwe	DNS	
	3	Malkana Maguy Safi	Democratic Republic of the Congo	DNS	
	3	Nirinaharifidy Ramilijaona	Madagascar	DNS	
	3	Kadiatou Camara	Mali	DNS	
	4	Ruddy Zang Milama	Gabon	DNS	

=== Semifinals ===
Qualification: First 3 of each semifinal (Q) and the next 2 fastest (q) qualified for the final.

Wind: Heat 1: +0.3 m/s, Heat 2: +0.8 m/s

Rank	Heat	Name	Nationality	Time	Notes
1	1	Oludamola Osayomi	Nigeria	11.41	Q
2	2	Vida Anim	Ghana	11.41	Q
3	1	Aminata Diouf	Senegal	11.46	Q
4	2	Gloria Kemasuode	Nigeria	11.48	Q
5	2	Delphine Atangana	Cameroon	11.49	Q
6	1	Geraldine Pillay	South Africa	11.58	Q
7	2	Myriam Léonie Mani	Cameroon	11.59	q
8	1	Ene Franca Idoko	Nigeria	11.61	q
9	2	Amandine Allou Affoué	Ivory Coast	11.64	
10	1	Gifty Addy	Ghana	11.78	
11	2	Esther Dankwah	Ghana	11.81	
12	1	Sergine Kouanga	Cameroon	11.90	
13	1	Joy Sakari	Kenya	12.06	
14	2	Sahara Tonde	Burkina Faso	12.21	
15	2	Leaynet Alemu	Ethiopia	12.39	
16	1	Atikilt Wobshet	Ethiopia	12.41	

=== Final ===
Wind: +0.1 m/s

Rank	Lane	Name	Nationality	Time	Notes
1st place, gold medalist(s)	5	Oludamola Osayomi	Nigeria	11.22	
2nd place, silver medalist(s)	4	Vida Anim	Ghana	11.43	
3rd place, bronze medalist(s)	8	Delphine Atangana	Cameroon	11.46	
4	8	Ene Franca Idoko	Nigeria	11.47	
5	8	Gloria Kemasuode	Nigeria	11.47	
6	7	Geraldine Pillay	South Africa	11.53	F1
7	2	Myriam Léonie Mani	Cameroon	11.60	
	3	Aminata Diouf	Senegal	DQ	
