= 2008 African Championships in Athletics – Women's 4 × 100 metres relay =

The women's 4 x 100 metres relay at the 2008 African Championships in Athletics was held on May 1–2.

== Medalists ==
Gold	Silver	Bronze
Nigeria; Endurance Ojokolo; Gloria Kemasuode; Susan Akene; Oludamola Osayomi	Ghana; Gifty Addy; Elizabeth Amolofo; Esther Dankwah; Vida Anim	South Africa; Tsholofelo Thipe; Isabel Le Roux; Christine Ras; Geraldine Pillay

== Results ==
=== Heats ===
Qualification: First 3 teams of each heat (Q) plus the next 2 fastest (q) qualified for the final.

Rank	Heat	Nation	Athletes	Time	Notes
1	2	Ghana	Gifty Addy, Elizabeth Amolofo, Esther Dankwah, Vida Anim	44.17	Q
2	2	Nigeria	Endurance Ojokolo, Gloria Kemasuode, Susan Akene, Oludamola Osayomi	44.25	Q
3	2	South Africa	Tsholofelo Thipe, Isabel Le Roux, Christine Ras, Geraldine Pillay	44.63	Q
4	2	Cameroon	Sergine Kouanga, Myriam Léonie Mani, Esther Solange Ndoumbe, Delphine Atangana	45.32	q
5	1	Senegal	Adja Arette Ndiaye, Mame Fatou Faye, Maty Salame, Aminata Diouf	45.70	Q
6	2	Burkina Faso	Mariette Mien, Kadi Traoré, Sahara Tonde, Béatrice Kamboulé	46.37	q
7	1	Ivory Coast	Fatoumata Coulibaly, Patricia Soman, Estelle Brou, Amandine Allou Affoué	46.44	Q
8	1	Ethiopia	Betelhem Shewatatek, Mantegbosh Melese, Leaynet Alemu, Atikilt Wobshet	47.04	Q
9	1	Chad	Hinikissia Albertine Ndikert, Kadidja Ahmat, Blague Neloumta, Florence Dembert	48.88	NR

=== Final ===
Rank	Lane	Nation	Competitors	Time	Notes
1st place, gold medalist(s)	5	Nigeria	Endurance Ojokolo, Gloria Kemasuode, Susan Akene, Oludamola Osayomi	43.79	
2nd place, silver medalist(s)	4	Ghana	Gifty Addy, Elizabeth Amolofo, Esther Dankwah, Vida Anim	44.12	
3rd place, bronze medalist(s)	8	South Africa	Tsholofelo Thipe, Isabel Le Roux, Christine Ras, Geraldine Pillay	44.28	
4	3	Senegal	Adja Arette Ndiaye, Mame Fatou Faye, Ndeye Fatou Soumah, Maty Salame	45.63	
5	6	Ivory Coast	Fatoumata Coulibaly, Patricia Soman, Estelle Brou, Amandine Allou Affoué	46.64	
6	7	Ethiopia	Betelhem Shewatatek, Mantegbosh Melese, Leaynet Alemu, Atikilt Wobshet	47.41	
7	1	Burkina Faso	Mariette Mien, Kadi Traoré, Sahara Tonde, Béatrice Kamboulé	50.37	
	2	Cameroon	Sergine Kouanga, Myriam Léonie Mani, Esther Solange Ndoumbe, Delphine Atangana	DNF	
