= Athletics at the 2006 Commonwealth Games – Women's 4 × 100 metres relay =

Women's 4 × 100 metres relay at the Commonwealth Games

The women's 4 × 100 metres relay event at the 2006 Commonwealth Games was held on March 25, 2006

== Results ==
Rank	Lane	Nation	Athletes	Time	Notes
1st place, gold medalist(s)	4	Jamaica	Danielle Browning, Sheri-Ann Brooks, Peta Dowdie, Sherone Simpson	43.10	
2nd place, silver medalist(s)	2	England	Anyika Onuora, Kim Wall, Laura Turner, Emma Ania	43.43	
3rd place, bronze medalist(s)	7	Australia	Sally McLellan, Melanie Kleeberg, Lauren Hewitt, Crystal Attenborough	44.25	
4	3	Nigeria	Jane Dike, Endurance Ojokolo, Funmilola Ogundana, Mercy Nku	44.37	
	6	Ghana	Gifty Addy, Elizabeth Amolofo, Mariama Salifu, Vida Anim	DNF	
	5	Cameroon	Delphine Atangana, Carole Kaboud Mebam, Myriam Léonie Mani, Sylvie Mballa Éloundou	DNS	
