= Athletics at the 2006 Commonwealth Games – Women's 200 metres =

Women's 200 metres at the Commonwealth Games

The women's 200 metres event at the 2006 Commonwealth Games was held on March 22–23.

== Medalists ==
Gold	Silver	Bronze
Sherone Simpson; Jamaica	Veronica Campbell; Jamaica	Geraldine Pillay; South Africa

== Results ==
=== Heats ===
Qualification: First 3 of each heat (Q) and the next 4 fastest (q) qualified for the semifinals.

Wind:
Heat 1: +0.8 m/s, Heat 2: +0.9 m/s, Heat 3: –0.2 m/s, Heat 4: –0.5 m/s

Rank	Heat	Name	Nationality	Time	Notes
1	4	Cydonie Mothersill	Cayman Islands	23.11	Q
2	3	Veronica Campbell	Jamaica	23.17	Q
3	2	Sheri-Ann Brooks	Jamaica	23.19	Q
4	2	Geraldine Pillay	South Africa	23.26	Q
5	1	Sherone Simpson	Jamaica	23.28	Q
6	2	Delphine Atangana	Cameroon	23.32	Q, PB
6	4	Erica Broomfield	Canada	23.32	Q, SB
8	3	Vida Anim	Ghana	23.47	Q, SB
9	4	Melanie Kleeberg	Australia	23.51	Q
10	1	Myriam Léonie Mani	Cameroon	23.55	Q, SB
11	1	Damayanthi Darsha	Sri Lanka	23.55	Q
12	3	Crystal Attenborough	Australia	23.64	Q
13	4	Mercy Nku	Nigeria	23.74	q
14	2	Anna Boyle	Northern Ireland	23.85	q
15	1	Eleni Artymata	Cyprus	23.88	q
16	4	Emma Wade	Belize	24.00	q
17	4	Gifty Addy	Ghana	24.18	
18	3	Mae Koime	Papua New Guinea	24.20	PB
19	2	Rachel Nachula	Zambia	24.38	PB
20	4	Catherine Murphy	Wales	24.55	
21	2	Sarah Bona	Sierra Leone	25.07	PB
22	1	Susan Tengatenga	Malawi	25.67	
23	1	Fatmata Bangura	Sierra Leone	26.27	
	3	Jane Dike	Nigeria	DQ	
	3	Isha Conteh	Sierra Leone	DNS	
	3	Curlee Gumbs	Anguilla	DNS	

=== Semifinals ===
Qualification: First 4 of each semifinal (Q) qualified directly for the final.

Wind:
Heat 1: +0.3 m/s, Heat 2: –0.5 m/s

Rank	Heat	Name	Nationality	Time	Notes
1	2	Sherone Simpson	Jamaica	23.18	Q
2	2	Cydonie Mothersill	Cayman Islands	23.19	Q
3	1	Veronica Campbell	Jamaica	23.23	Q
4	2	Geraldine Pillay	South Africa	23.29	Q
5	2	Sheri-Ann Brooks	Jamaica	23.39	Q
6	1	Vida Anim	Ghana	23.47	Q
7	2	Myriam Léonie Mani	Cameroon	23.52	Q, SB
8	1	Delphine Atangana	Cameroon	23.61	Q, PB
9	1	Erica Broomfield	Canada	23.83	
10	2	Crystal Attenborough	Australia	23.88	
11	2	Mercy Nku	Nigeria	23.90	
12	1	Melanie Kleeberg	Australia	23.96	
13	2	Anna Boyle	Northern Ireland	24.03	
14	2	Emma Wade	Belize	24.05	
15	1	Eleni Artymata	Cyprus	24.21	
16	1	Damayanthi Darsha	Sri Lanka	24.22	

=== Final ===
Wind: +0.6 m/s

Rank	Lane	Name	Nationality	Time	Notes
1st place, gold medalist(s)	3	Sherone Simpson	Jamaica	22.59	
2nd place, silver medalist(s)	4	Veronica Campbell	Jamaica	22.72	
3rd place, bronze medalist(s)	8	Geraldine Pillay	South Africa	22.92	
4	6	Cydonie Mothersill	Cayman Islands	23.01	
5	5	Sheri-Ann Brooks	Jamaica	23.07	
6	2	Vida Anim	Ghana	23.34	SB
7	7	Delphine Atangana	Cameroon	23.45	PB
8	1	Myriam Léonie Mani	Cameroon	23.78	
