= 2008 African Championships in Athletics – Women's 4 × 400 metres relay =

The women's 4 x 400 metres relay at the 2008 African Championships in Athletics was held on May 3–4.

== Medalists ==
Gold	Silver	Bronze
Nigeria; Oluoma Nwoke; Folashade Abugan; Endurance Abinuwa; Joy Eze; Ngozi Nwokocha*	Kenya; Florence Wasike; Charity Wandia; Joy Sakari; Pamela Jelimo; Elizabeth Muthuka*	Senegal; Fatou Diabaye; Maty Salame; Ndèye Fatou Soumah; Mame Fatou Faye

* Athletes who participated in heats only.

== Results ==
=== Heats ===
Qualification: First 3 teams of each heat (Q) plus the next 2 fastest (q) qualified for the final.

Rank	Heat	Nation	Athletes	Time	Notes
1	2	Nigeria	Oluoma Nwoke, Ngozi Nwokocha, Endurance Abinuwa, Joy Eze	3:34.90	Q
2	1	Botswana	Seonyatseng Nthompe, Amantle Montsho, Irene Mutunge, Kgalalelo Sefo	3:41.40	Q
3	2	Sudan	Faiza Omar, Hind Musa, Nawal El Jack, Amina Bakhit	3:42.24	Q
4	1	Senegal	Fatou Diabaye, Mame Fatou Faye, Maty Salame, Ndèye Fatou Soumah	3:42.24	Q
5	2	Ghana	V.S. Kantanka, Charity Boahemaa, Ayisha Mitchel, Elizabeth Amolofo	3:46.39	Q
6	1	Kenya	Florence Wasike, Joy Sakari, Charity Wandia, Elizabeth Muthuka	3:47.27	Q
7	1	Morocco	Hayat Lambarki, Saïda El Mehdi, Fadoua Adili, Malika Abaakil	3:48.44	q
8	2	Ethiopia	Wesene Daba, Mulu Diriba, Feyine Gudeto, Wesene Belay	3:50.14	q
	1	Cameroon	Sergine Kouanga, Thérese Ngono Etoundi, Esther Solange Ndoumbe, Charlotte Mebenga Amombo	DQ	
	2	South Africa	Geraldine Pillay, Isabel Le Roux, Tihanna Vorster, Tsholofelo Thipe	DNS	

=== Final ===
Rank	Nation	Competitors	Time	Notes
1st place, gold medalist(s)	Nigeria	Oluoma Nwoke, Folashade Abugan, Endurance Abinuwa, Joy Eze	3:30.07	
2nd place, silver medalist(s)	Kenya	Florence Wasike, Charity Wandia, Joy Sakari, Pamela Jelimo	3:37.67	
3rd place, bronze medalist(s)	Senegal	Fatou Diabaye, Mame Fatou Faye, Maty Salame, Ndèye Fatou Soumah	3:38.42	
4	Morocco	Hayat Lambarki, Malika Abaakil, Hanane Skhyi, Lamiae Lhabze	3:41.54	
5	Ghana	V.S. Kantanka, Charity Boahemaa, Janet Amponsah, Elizabeth Amolofo	3:42.36	
6	Sudan	Faiza Omar, Hind Musa, Nawal El Jack, Amina Bakhit	3:45.07	
7	Ethiopia	Wesene Daba, Mulu Diriba, Feyine Gudeto, Wesene Belay	3:51.68	
	Botswana	Seonyatseng Nthompe, Kgalalelo Sefo, Irene Mutunge, Amantle Montsho	DNF	
