= Amandine Allou Affoue =

Ivorian sprinter (born 1980)

Medal record

Women's athletics

Representing Ivory Coast

African Championships
Silver medal – second place	2002 Radès	4×100 m
Bronze medal – third place	2012 Porto-Novo	4×100 m

Amandine Allou Affoué (born 29 August 1980 in Botro) is a Côte d'Ivoire sprinter who specializes in the 100 and 200 metres.

Allou represented Côte d'Ivoire at the 2008 Summer Olympics in Beijing competing at the 100 metres sprint. In her first round heat she placed fifth in a time of 11.75 which was not enough to advance to the second round.

== Competition record ==
Year	Competition	Venue	Position	Event	Notes
Representing Ivory Coast
2000	Olympic Games	Athens, Greece	18th (h)	4 × 100 m relay	44.34 (NR)
2001	Jeux de la Francophonie	Ottawa, Canada	14th (sf)	100 m	12.09
2001	Jeux de la Francophonie	Ottawa, Canada	12th (h)	200 m	24.82
2001	Jeux de la Francophonie	Ottawa, Canada	2nd	4 × 100 m relay	43.89
2001	World Championships	Edmonton, Canada	9th (h)	4 × 100 m relay	44.05
2002	African Championships	Radès, Tunisia	5th	100 m	11.66
2002	African Championships	Radès, Tunisia	6th	200 m	23.93
2002	African Championships	Radès, Tunisia	2nd	4 × 100 m relay	47.15
2003	World Championships	Paris, France	15th (h)	4 × 100 m relay	45.60
2003	All-Africa Games	Abuja, Nigeria	7th	100 m	11.57
2003	All-Africa Games	Abuja, Nigeria	9th (h)	200 m	23.70
2003	All-Africa Games	Abuja, Nigeria	4th	4 × 100 m relay	45.69
2004	African Championships	Brazzaville, Republic of the Congo	5th	100 m	11.54
2004	African Championships	Brazzaville, Republic of the Congo	5th	200 m	23.74
2004	Olympic Games	Athens, Greece	36th (h)	100 m	11.46
2005	World Championships	Helsinki, Finland	28th (qf)	100 m	11.57
2005	Jeux de la Francophonie	Niamey, Niger	2nd	100 m	11.67
2005	Jeux de la Francophonie	Niamey, Niger	2nd	4 × 100 m relay	45.36
2006	World Indoor Championships	Moscow, Russia	15th (h)	60 m	7.37
2006	African Championships	Bambous, Mauritius	4th	100 m	12.03
2006	African Championships	Bambous, Mauritius	6th	200 m	23.58
2007	All-Africa Games	Algiers, Algeria	5th	100 m	11.52
2007	All-Africa Games	Algiers, Algeria	3rd	200 m	23.44
2007	All-Africa Games	Algiers, Algeria	3rd	4 × 100 m relay	44.48
2007	World Championships	Osaka, Japan	28th (qf)	100 m	11.57
2007	World Championships	Osaka, Japan	25th (qf)	200 m	23.46
2008	World Indoor Championships	Valencia, Spain	25th (h)	60 m	7.57
2008	African Championships	Addis Ababa, Ethiopia	9th (sf)	100 m	11.64
2008	African Championships	Addis Ababa, Ethiopia	11th (sf)	200 m	24.18
2008	African Championships	Addis Ababa, Ethiopia	5th	4 × 100 m relay	46.64
2008	Olympic Games	Beijing, China	48th (h)	100 m	11.75
2012	African Championships	Porto-Novo, Benin	22nd (sf)	100 m	12.69
2012	African Championships	Porto-Novo, Benin	3rd	4 × 100 m relay	45.29

== Personal bests ==
- 60 metres - 7.34 s (2006, indoor)
- 100 metres - 11.27 s (2007)
- 200 metres - 23.08 s (2005)
- 4 x 100 metres relay - 43.89 s (2001) - national record.

Olympic Games
Preceded by Mariam Bah	Flagbearer for Ivory Coast; Beijing 2008	Succeeded by Ben Youssef Meite
