= 2007 World Championships in Athletics – Women's 200 metres =

The women's 200 metres event at the 2007 World Championships in Athletics took place on 29–31 August (final) at the Nagai Stadium.

Having run the fastest time in the world this year, Allyson Felix entered as the favorite to retain her World Championship title. Her rival Veronica Campbell-Brown was her only threat from retaining her title.

In the final both Felix and Campbell-Brown shot out of the blocks like rockets, matching each other stride for stride, it was a bloody battle for the gold medal position. Coming into the straight, at the midpoint of the race, Veronica seemed to have a slight advantage over Allyson. Then Felix produced a display of speed and strength endurance that was simply astonishing, pulling away from the reigning olympic champion to win by a five-metre margin. Veronica and Susanthika Jayasinghe took second and third place respectively.

At 21 years old Felix ran under 22 seconds for the first time, winning in 21.81 seconds. The only athlete to run under 22 seconds for this race - making it the time of the Century at the time. Felix is the most decorated track and field athlete in history.

As of 2024, Felix's winning margin of 0.53 seconds remains the only time the women's 200 metres has been won by more than half a second at these championships.

== Medalists ==
Gold	Allyson Felix; United States (USA)
Silver	Veronica Campbell; Jamaica (JAM)
Bronze	Susanthika Jayasinghe; Sri Lanka (SRI)

== Records ==
World record	21.34	Florence Griffith-Joyner	Seoul, South Korea	September 29, 1988
Championship Record	21.74	Silke Gladisch	Rome, Italy	September 3, 1987

== Results ==
=== Heats ===
Qualification: First 4 in each heat(Q) and the next 8 fastest (q) advance to the quarterfinals.

==== Heat 1 ====
Rank	Lane	Athlete	Nation	Time (sec)	Notes
1	4	Allyson Felix	United States	22.50	Q
2	8	Susanthika Jayasinghe	Sri Lanka	22.55	Q, SB
3	3	Sherry Fletcher	Grenada	22.94	Q
4	7	Roxana Díaz	Cuba	23.06	Q
5	5	Tahesia Harrigan	Cayman Islands	23.46	q
6	6	Myriam Léonie Mani	Cameroon	23.66	
-	2	Fabienne Féraez	Benin	DNS	

==== Heat 2 ====
Rank	Lane	Athlete	Nation	Time (sec)	Notes
1	2	LaShauntea Moore	United States	22.93	Q
2	6	Debbie Ferguson-McKenzie	Bahamas	23.07	Q
3	5	Yelena Bolsun	Russia	23.11	Q
4	4	Zudikey Rodríguez	Mexico	23.96	Q
5	3	Kay Khine Lwin	Myanmar	24.50	SB
6	8	Abdikarim Sheikh Fowzio	Somalia	30.87	PB
-	7	Emily Freeman	Great Britain & N.I.	DSQ	
-	9	Rakia Al-Gassra	Bahrain	DNS	

==== Heat 3 ====
Rank	Lane	Athlete	Nation	Time (sec)	Notes
1	2	Tezzhan Naimova	Bulgaria	22.84	Q
2	4	LaVerne Jones	U.S. Virgin Islands	23.04	Q
3	7	Yuliya Chermoshanskaya	Russia	23.21	Q
4	3	Iryna Shtanhyeyeva	Ukraine	23.23	Q
5	5	Geraldine Pillay	South Africa	23.39	q
6	6	Gretta Taslakian	Lebanon	24.35	
-	8	Monika Bejnar	Poland	DNS	

==== Heat 4 ====
Rank	Lane	Athlete	Nation	Time (sec)	Notes
1	4	Sanya Richards	United States	22.74	Q
2	8	Cydonie Mothersill	British Virgin Islands	22.86	Q
3	7	Aleen Bailey	Jamaica	22.94	Q
4	2	Vida Anim	Ghana	23.16	Q
5	3	Guzel Khubbieva	Uzbekistan	23.25	q, SB
6	6	Louise Ayétotché	Ivory Coast	23.34	q
7	8	Ewelina Klocek	Poland	23.38	q
8	9	Kirsten Nieuwendam	Suriname	24.52	NR

==== Heat 5 ====
Rank	Lane	Athlete	Nation	Time (sec)	Notes
1	3	Muriel Hurtis-Houairi	France	22.83	Q
2	2	Kim Gevaert	Belgium	22.91	Q
3	4	Virgil Hodge	Saint Kitts and Nevis	23.00	Q
4	7	Cathleen Tschirch	Germany	23.30	Q
5	5	Felipa Palacios	Colombia	23.32	q
6	8	Olena Chebanu	Ukraine	23.40	q, SB
7	6	Kadiatou Camara	Mali	23.48	

==== Heat 6 ====
Rank	Lane	Athlete	Nation	Time (sec)	Notes
1	5	Veronica Campbell	Jamaica	22.87	Q
2	2	Torri Edwards	United States	22.90	Q
3	4	Joice Maduaka	Great Britain & N.I.	23.22	Q
4	3	Affoué Amandine Allou	Ivory Coast	23.24	Q, SB
5	7	Natalia Rusakova	Russia	23.24	q
6	8	Ionela Târlea-Manolache	Romania	23.48	
7	6	Sakie Nobuoka	Japan	23.74	SB

=== Quarterfinals ===
First 4 of each Quarterfinal qualifies (Q).

==== Heat 1 ====
Rank	Lane	Athlete	Nation	Time (sec)	Notes
1	6	Sanya Richards	United States	22.31	Q, SB
2	7	Susanthika Jayasinghe	Sri Lanka	22.55	Q, SB
3	4	Virgil Hodge	Saint Kitts and Nevis	22.84	Q
4	5	LaVerne Jones	U.S. Virgin Islands	23.03	Q
5	8	Yuliya Chermoshanskaya	Russia	23.15	
6	3	Olena Chebanu	Ukraine	23.21	SB
7	9	Felipa Palacios	Colombia	23.24	
8	2	Cathleen Tschirch	Germany	23.50	

==== Heat 2 ====
Rank	Lane	Athlete	Nation	Time (sec)	Notes
1	5	Allyson Felix	United States	22.61	Q
2	7	Yelena Bolsun	Russia	22.80	Q
3	4	Cydonie Mothersill	Cayman Islands	22.82	Q
4	6	Kim Gevaert	Belgium	22.96	Q
5	3	Guzel Khubbieva	Uzbekistan	23.28	
6	2	Tahesia Harrigan	British Virgin Islands	23.52	
7	8	Joice Maduaka	Great Britain & N.I.	23.62	
8	9	Zudikey Rodríguez	Mexico	24.31	

==== Heat 3 ====
Rank	Lane	Athlete	Nation	Time (sec)	Notes
1	5	Veronica Campbell	Jamaica	22.55	Q
2	6	Torri Edwards	United States	22.62	Q
3	7	Tezzhan Naimova	Bulgaria	22.87	Q
4	3	Sherry Fletcher	Grenada	23.02	Q
5	8	Iryna Shtanhyeyeva	Ukraine	23.17	
6	9	Ewelina Klocek	Poland	23.26	PB
7	2	Vida Anim	Ghana	23.47	
8	3	Louise Ayétotché	Ivory Coast	23.60	

==== Heat 4 ====
Rank	Lane	Athlete	Nation	Time (sec)	Notes
1	5	Aleen Bailey	Jamaica	22.60	Q, SB
2	7	LaShauntea Moore	United States	22.71	Q
3	8	Roxana Díaz	Cuba	22.79	Q
4	6	Debbie Ferguson-McKenzie	Bahamas	22.81	Q
5	4	Muriel Hurtis-Houairi	France	22.86	
6	3	Natalia Rusakova	Russia	22.97	
7	9	Affoué Amandine Allou	Ivory Coast	23.46	
8	2	Geraldine Pillay	South Africa	23.55	

=== Semifinals ===
First 4 of each Semifinal qualifies (Q).

==== Heat 1 ====
Rank	Lane	Athlete	Nation	Time (sec)	Notes
1	7	Allyson Felix	United States	22.21	Q
2	5	Veronica Campbell	Jamaica	22.44	Q
3	4	Torri Edwards	United States	22.51, SB	Q
4	9	Cydonie Mothersill	Cayman Islands	22.78	Q
5	8	Sherry Fletcher	Grenada	22.96	
6	6	Yelena Bolsun	Russia	23.01	
7	3	Virgil Hodge	Saint Kitts and Nevis	23.06	
-	2	Kim Gevaert	Belgium	DNS	

==== Heat 2 ====
Rank	Lane	Athlete	Nation	Time (sec)	Notes
1	6	Sanya Richards	United States	22.50	Q
2	7	Aleen Bailey	Jamaica	22.65	Q
3	5	Susanthika Jayasinghe	Sri Lanka	22.66	Q
4	4	LaShauntea Moore	United States	22.73	Q
5	3	Tezzhan Naimova	Bulgaria	22.88	
6	8	Roxana Diaz	Cuba	22.98	
7	9	Debbie Ferguson-McKenzie	Bahamas	23.27	
8	2	LaVerne Jones	U.S. Virgin Islands	23:34	

=== Final ===
31 August 2007

Rank	Athlete	Nation	Time	Notes
1st place, gold medalist(s)	Allyson Felix	United States	21.81	WL
2nd place, silver medalist(s)	Veronica Campbell	Jamaica	22.34	SB
3rd place, bronze medalist(s)	Susanthika Jayasinghe	Sri Lanka	22.63	
4	Torri Edwards	United States	22.65	
5	Sanya Richards	United States	22.70	
6	Aleen Bailey	Jamaica	22.72	
7	LaShauntea Moore	United States	22.97	
8	Cydonie Mothersille	Cayman Islands	23.08	
