= Elizabeth Amolofo =

Ghanaian sprinter (born 1981)

Medal record

Women's athletics

Representing Ghana

African Championships
Gold medal – first place	2006 Bambous	4×100 m
Silver medal – second place	2008 Addis Ababa	4×100 m
Bronze medal – third place	2010 Nairobi	4×100 m

Elizabeth Amolofo (born 2 September 1981) is a Ghanaian sprinter who specializes in the 200 metres.

== International competitions ==
Year	Competition	Venue	Position	Event	Notes
Representing Ghana
2006	Commonwealth Games	Melbourne, Australia	–	4 × 100 m relay	DNF
2006	African Championships	Bambous, Mauritius	10th (h)	200 m	24.66
2006	African Championships	Bambous, Mauritius	1st	4 × 100 m relay	44.43
2007	All-Africa Games	Algiers, Algeria	12th (sf)	200 m	24.12
2007	World Championships	Osaka, Japan	12th (h)	4 × 100 m relay	43.76
2008	African Championships	Addis Ababa, Ethiopia	13th (sf)	200 m	24.44
2008	African Championships	Addis Ababa, Ethiopia	2nd	4 × 100 m relay	44.12
2008	African Championships	Addis Ababa, Ethiopia	5th	4 × 400 m relay	3:42.36
2010	African Championships	Nairobi, Kenya	12th (sf)	400 m	54.43
2010	African Championships	Nairobi, Kenya	3rd	4 × 100 m relay	45.40
2010	Commonwealth Games	Delhi, India	19th (sf)	100 m	11.89
2010	Commonwealth Games	Delhi, India	2nd	4 × 100 m relay	45.24

=== Personal bests ===
- 100 metres – 11.91 s (2006)
- 200 metres – 24.12 s (2007)
