= Louise Ayétotché =

Ivorian sprinter (born 1975)

Personal information
- Born: 3 June 1970 (age 56)

Sport
- Sport: Track and field
Medal record
Representing Ivory Coast
African Games
Silver medal – second place	1991 Cairo	4x100 m relay
Bronze medal – third place	1991 Cairo	4x400 m relay
Bronze medal – third place	2007 Algiers	4x100 m relay
African Championships
Bronze medal – third place	2006 Bambous	400 m

Athouhon Louise Ayétotché (born 3 June 1970) is a retired Ivorian sprinter who specialized in the 100 meters and the 200 metres. She represented her country at the 1992 and 2000 Summer Olympics, as well as four World Championships.

== Achievements ==
Year	Competition	Venue	Position	Event	Notes
Representing Ivory Coast
1991	All-Africa Games	Cairo, Egypt	2nd	4x100 m relay	45.86
1991	All-Africa Games	Cairo, Egypt	3rd	4x400 m relay	3:44.06
1992	Olympic Games	Barcelona, Spain	–	4x100 m relay	DQ
1994	Jeux de la Francophonie	Bondoufle, France	5th	400 m	54.33
1994	Jeux de la Francophonie	Bondoufle, France	2nd	4x400 m relay	3:41.48
1995	Universiade	Fukuoka, Japan	37th (h)	100 m	13.19
1995	Universiade	Fukuoka, Japan	28th (qf)	200 m	24.83
1999	World Championships	Seville, Spain	36th (h)	200 m	23.54
1999	World Championships	Seville, Spain	43rd (sf)	400 m	55.44
1999	All-Africa Games	Johannesburg, South Africa	8th	100 m	11.61
1999	All-Africa Games	Johannesburg, South Africa	6th	200 m	23.45
2000	Olympic Games	Sydney, Australia	34th (h)	100 m	11.52
2000	Olympic Games	Sydney, Australia	9th (sf)	200 m	22.76
2000	Olympic Games	Sydney, Australia	18th (h)	4x100 m relay	44.34
2001	Jeux de la Francophonie	Niamey, Niger	4th	100 m	11.50
2001	Jeux de la Francophonie	Niamey, Niger	7th	200 m	23.60
2001	Jeux de la Francophonie	Niamey, Niger	2nd	4 × 100 m relay	43.89
2001	World Championships	Edmonton, Canada	29th (h)	100 m	11.53
2001	World Championships	Edmonton, Canada	21st (sf)	200 m	23.47
2001	World Championships	Edmonton, Canada	9th (h)	4x100 m relay	44.05
2003	World Championships	Paris, France	15th (h)	4x100 m relay	45.60
2003	All-Africa Games	Abuja, Nigeria	6th	200 m	23.76
2003	All-Africa Games	Abuja, Nigeria	4th	4x100 m relay	45.69
2003	Afro-Asian Games	Hyderabad, India	5th	200 m	23.71
2005	Jeux de la Francophonie	Niamey, Niger	8th	200 m	24.59
2005	Jeux de la Francophonie	Niamey, Niger	2nd	4x100 m relay	45.36
2006	African Championships	Bambous, Mauritius	8th	100 m	12.18
2006	African Championships	Bambous, Mauritius	5th	200 m	23.53
2006	African Championships	Bambous, Mauritius	3rd	400 m	52.92
2007	All-Africa Games	Algiers, Algeria	11th (sf)	100 m	11.70
2007	All-Africa Games	Algiers, Algeria	7th	200 m	23.88
2007	All-Africa Games	Algiers, Algeria	3rd	4x100 m relay	44.48
2007	World Championships	Osaka, Japan	30th (qf)	200 m	23.60

=== Personal bests ===
- 100 metres - 11.35 s (2000)- Former national record.
- 200 metres - 22.76 s (2000) - Former national record.
- 400 metres - 52.92 s (2006)
- 4 x 100 metres relay - 43.89 s (2001) - national record.
