= Janice Josephs =

South African athlete

Medal record

Women's athletics

Representing South Africa

African Championships
Gold medal – first place	2002 Radès	4×100 m
Gold medal – first place	2006 Bambous	Heptathlon
Gold medal – first place	2008 Addis Ababa	Long jump
Silver medal – second place	2004 Brazzaville	Heptathlon
Silver medal – second place	2012 Porto-Novo	Long jump
Bronze medal – third place	2004 Brazzaville	High jump

Janice Josephs (born 31 March 1982 in Cape Town) is a South African heptathlete turned long jumper.

She finished nineteenth at the 2004 Summer Olympics and fifth at the 2006 Commonwealth Games, the latter in a personal best score of 6181 points. On the regional level she won a silver medal at the 2004 African Championships and the gold at the 2006 African Championships. At the 2007 All-Africa Games she only entered the long jump competition, which she won with a new personal best of 6.79 metres. She did not reach the final at the 2007 World Championships, but finished eighth at the 2008 World Indoor Championships and won another gold medal at the 2008 African Championships.

== Competition record ==
Year	Competition	Venue	Position	Event	Notes
Representing South Africa
2000	World Junior Championships	Santiago, Chile	28th (h)	200m	25.65 (wind: -1.2 m/s)
2002	African Championships	Radès, Tunisia	1st	4 × 100 m relay	45.60 s
2004	African Championships	Brazzaville, Republic of the Congo	3rd	High jump	1.50 m
2004	African Championships	Brazzaville, Republic of the Congo	2nd	Heptathlon	5785 pts
2004	Olympic Games	Athens, Greece	19th	Heptathlon	6074 pts
2005	World Championships	Helsinki, Finland	–	Heptathlon	DNF
2006	Commonwealth Games	Melbourne, Australia	5th	Heptathlon	6181 pts
2006	African Championships	Bambous, Mauritius	1st	Heptathlon	5876 pts
2007	All-Africa Games	Algiers, Algeria	1st	Long jump	6.79 m
2007	World Championships	Osaka, Japan	24th (q)	Long jump	6.44 m
2008	World Indoor Championships	Valencia, Spain	8th	Long jump	6.25 m
2008	African Championships	Addis Ababa, Ethiopia	1st	Long jump	6.64 m
2009	World Championships	Berlin, Germany	30th (q)	Long jump	6.22 m
2010	World Indoor Championships	Doha, Qatar	21st (q)	Long jump	6.02 m
2012	African Championships	Porto-Novo, Benin	2nd	Long jump	6.29 m
