= Céline Laporte =

Seychellois Olympic athlete

Personal information
- Full name: Céline Roseline Laporte
- Born: 7 December 1984 (age 41) Cannes, France
- Height: 164 cm (5 ft 5 in)
- Weight: 51 kg (112 lb)

Sport
- Country: France
- Sport: Athletics (track and field)
- Club: Entente Franconville Césame Val d'Oise
Medal record
Women's athletics
Representing Seychelles
African Championships
Silver medal – second place	2006 Bambous	Heptathlon
Bronze medal – third place	2004 Brazzaville	Heptathlon

Céline Roseline Laporte (born 7 December 1984 in Cannes) is a French-born Seychellois athlete who competes in long jump, 100 metres hurdles and heptathlon. She represented France until 2003.

She competed at the 2006 Commonwealth Games, where she received a bronze medal in the women's long jump. She competed in the 100 metres hurdles at the 2004 Summer Olympics and the 2005 World Championships. In 2006, she won the silver medal in the heptathlon at the African Championships

== Achievements ==
Year	Competition	Venue	Position	Event	Notes
Representing France
2002	World Junior Championships	Kingston, Jamaica	13th	Heptathlon	4967 pts
Representing Seychelles
2003	World Championships	Paris, France	37th (h)	100 m hurdles	14.29
2003	All-Africa Games	Abuja, Nigeria	–	Heptathlon	DNF
2004	African Championships	Brazzaville, Republic of the Congo	3rd	Heptathlon	5172 pts
2004	Olympic Games	Athens, Greece	35th (h)	100 m hurdles	13.92
2005	World Championships	Helsinki, Finland	30th (h)	100 m hurdles	14.00
2005	Jeux de la Francophonie	Niamey, Niger	2nd	Long jump	6.24 m
2006	Commonwealth Games	Melbourne, Australia	3rd	Long jump	6.57 m
2006	African Championships	Bambous, Mauritius	6th	Long jump	6.01 m
2006	African Championships	Bambous, Mauritius	2nd	Heptathlon	4932 pts
