= 2006 African Championships in Athletics – Women's 4 × 100 metres relay =

The men's 4 × 100 metres relay event at the 2006 African Championships in Athletics was held at the Stade Germain Comarmond on August 11.

== Results ==
Rank	Lane	Nation	Competitors	Time	Notes
1st place, gold medalist(s)	6	Ghana	Gifty Addy, Elizabeth Amolofo, Vida Anim, Esther Dankwah	44.43	
2nd place, silver medalist(s)	5	Nigeria	Toyin Augustus, Francisca Idoko, Gloria Kemasuode, Endurance Ojokolo	44.52	
3rd place, bronze medalist(s)	3	Cameroon	Esther Solange Ndoumbe, Carole Kaboud Mebam, Joséphine Mbarga-Bikié, Myriam Léonie Mani	46.43	
4	3	Senegal	Lucie Mendy, Maty Salame, Gnima Faye, Aminata Diouf	47.22	
