= Elisa Cossa =

Mozambican athlete

Medal record

Women's athletics

Representing Mozambique

African Championships
Silver medal – second place	2000 Algiers	Long jump

Elisa Samuel Macundo Cossa (born 3 June 1980) is a retired Mozambican athlete who competed mostly in the sprinting events and the long jump. Her biggest success is the silver medal in the long jump at the 2000 African Championships.

She is Mozambican record holder in the 100 metres and the long jump.

== Competition record ==
Year	Competition	Venue	Position	Event	Notes
Representing Mozambique
1998	Ibero-American Championships	Lisbon, Portugal	10th (h)	100 m	12.16
1998	Ibero-American Championships	Lisbon, Portugal	7th	Long jump	5.82 m
1998	Commonwealth Games	Kuala Lumpur, Malaysia	20th (h)	100 m	12.38
1999	All-Africa Games	Johannesburg, South Africa	9th (sf)	100 m	11.64
1999	All-Africa Games	Johannesburg, South Africa	7th	Long jump	6.28 m
2000	Ibero-American Championships	Rio de Janeiro, Brazil	6th	100 m	11.90
2000	Ibero-American Championships	Rio de Janeiro, Brazil	6th	Long jump	5.79 m
2000	African Championships	Algiers, Algeria	2nd	Long jump	6.20 m
2002	Commonwealth Games	Manchester, United Kingdom	19th (h)	100 m	12.07
2002	Commonwealth Games	Manchester, United Kingdom	17th (h)	200 m	24.47
2003	All-Africa Games	Abuja, Nigeria	12th (sf)	100 m	11.99
2004	Ibero-American Championships	Huelva, Spain	9th (h)	100 m	12.00
2006	African Championships	Bambous, Mauritius	15th (h)	100 m	12.69
2006	African Championships	Bambous, Mauritius	12th (h)	200 m	25.29
2006	Lusophony Games	Macau, China	3rd	200 m	24.57
2007	All-Africa Games	Algiers, Algeria	15th (h)	200 m	24.42
2007	All-Africa Games	Algiers, Algeria	14th (h)	400 m	54.09
2008	African Championships	Addis Ababa, Ethiopia	14th (sf)	400 m	54.91
2010	African Championships	Nairobi, Kenya	26th (h)	400 m	58.87
2010	Commonwealth Games	New Delhi, India	24th (sf)	400 m	55.71
2011	All-Africa Games	Maputo, Mozambique	10th (h)	800 m	2:11.87

== Personal bests ==
- 100 metres – 11.61 (+0.7 m/s) (Girona 2000) NR
- 200 metres – 24.21 (+0.1 m/s) (Réduit 2002)
- 400 metres – 54.09 (Algiers 2007)
- 800 metres – 2:09.47 (Madrid 2008)
- Long jump – 6.40 (+0.2 m/s) (Pretoria 2000) NR
