= Esther Dankwah =

Ghanaian sprinter (born 1982)

Medal record

Women's athletics

Representing Ghana

African Championships
Gold medal – first place	2006 Bambous	4×100 m
Silver medal – second place	2008 Addis Ababa	4×100 m

Esther Dankwah (born June 25, 1982) is a Ghanaian sprinter who specializes in the 100 metres. She has been living in the Netherlands since 2003.

She won the bronze medal with the African 4 x 100 metres relay team at the 2006 IAAF World Cup. With the Ghanaian 4 x 100 metres relay team she won a gold medal at the 2007 All-Africa Games and a silver medal at the 2008 African Championships.

== Achievements ==
Year	Competition	Venue	Position	Event	Notes
Representing Ghana
1999	African Junior Championships	Tunis, Tunisia	4th	100 m	12.12
1999	African Junior Championships	Tunis, Tunisia	5th	200 m	25.03 (w)
1999	African Junior Championships	Tunis, Tunisia	2nd	4 × 100 m relay	47.13
1999	African Junior Championships	Tunis, Tunisia	1st	4 × 400 m relay	3:41.83
1999	All-Africa Games	Johannesburg, South Africa	20th (h)	100 m	12.15
2006	African Championships	Bambous, Mauritius	11th (h)	100 m	12.35
2006	African Championships	Bambous, Mauritius	1st	4 × 100 m relay	44.43
2007	All-Africa Games	Algiers, Algeria	15th (sf)	100 m	11.92
2007	All-Africa Games	Algiers, Algeria	14th (sf)	200 m	24.24
2007	All-Africa Games	Algiers, Algeria	1st	4 × 100 m relay	43.84
2007	World Championships	Osaka, Japan	12th (h)	4 × 100 m relay	43.76
2008	African Championships	Addis Ababa, Ethiopia	11th (sf)	100 m	11.81
2008	African Championships	Addis Ababa, Ethiopia	2nd	4 × 100 m relay	44.12

== Personal bests ==
- 60 metres - 7.35 s (2006, indoor)
- 100 metres - 11.56 s (2005)
- 200 metres - 23.97 s (2007)
