= Athletics at the 2003 All-Africa Games – Women's pole vault =

The men's pole vault event at the 2003 All-Africa Games was held on October 11.

== Results ==
Rank	Name	Nationality	Result	Notes
1st place, gold medalist(s)	Samantha Dodd	South Africa	3.90	GR
2nd place, silver medalist(s)	Amelie van Wyk	South Africa	3.80	
3rd place, bronze medalist(s)	Margaretha Duplessis	South Africa	3.50	
