= Gloria Kemasuode =

Nigerian sprinter

Personal information
- Born: 30 December 1979 (age 46) Delta State, Nigeria

Sport
- Sport: Track and field
Medal record
Representing Nigeria
Olympic Games
Silver medal – second place	2008 Beijing	4x100 m relay
African Championships
Gold medal – first place	2004 Brazzaville	4×100 m relay
Gold medal – first place	2008 Addis Ababa	4×100 m relay
Silver medal – second place	2006 Bambous	4×100 m relay

Gloria E. Kemasuode Ubiebor (born 30 December 1979) is a female track and field sprint athlete, who competes internationally for Nigeria.

Kemasuode represented Nigeria at the 2008 Summer Olympics in Beijing, competing at the 4 x 100 metres relay together with Agnes Osazuwa, Oludamola Osayomi and Ene Franca Idoko. In their first round heat they placed fourth behind Belgium, Great Britain and Brazil. Their time of 43.43 seconds was the best non-directly qualifying time and the sixth time overall out of sixteen participating nations. With this result they qualified for the final, in which they replaced Osazuwa with Halimat Ismaila. They sprinted to a time of 43.04 seconds, a third place and a bronze medal after Russia and Belgium. In 2016, the Russian team was disqualified and stripped of their gold medal due to doping violations by one of the Russian runners, Yuliya Chermoshanskaya, thereby promoting Nigeria to the silver medal position.

Kemasuode failed a drugs test at the Circuito de Corridas e Caminhada in Brazil and was banned from competition for two years over the period of 24 July 2009 – 23 July 2011.

== Achievements ==
Year	Competition	Venue	Position	Event	Notes
Representing Nigeria
2004	Olympic Games	Athens, Greece	7th	4 × 100 m relay	43.42
2005	World Championships	Helsinki, Finland	7th	4 × 100 m relay	43.25
2006	African Championships	Bambous, Mauritius	7th	100 m	12.14
2006	African Championships	Bambous, Mauritius	2nd	4 × 100 m relay	44.52
2007	All-Africa Games	Algiers, Algeria	6th	100 m	11.53
2008	African Championships	Addis Ababa, Ethiopia	5th	100 m	11.47
2008	African Championships	Addis Ababa, Ethiopia	1st	4 × 100 m relay	43.79
2008	Olympic Games	Beijing, China	2nd	4 × 100 m relay	43.04

=== Personal bests ===
- 60 metres – 7.48 s (2005)
- 100 metres – 11.21 s (2002)
- 200 metres – 23.26 s (2006)

== See also ==
- List of doping cases in sport
