= Athletics at the 2007 All-Africa Games – Women's long jump =

The women's long jump at the 2007 All-Africa Games was held on July 21.

== Results ==
Rank	Athlete	Nationality	Result	Notes
1st place, gold medalist(s)	Janice Josephs	South Africa	6.79	
2nd place, silver medalist(s)	Blessing Okagbare	Nigeria	6.46	
3rd place, bronze medalist(s)	Yah Koïta	Mali	6.35w	
4	Chinazou Amadi	Nigeria	6.33	
5	Joséphine Mbarga-Bikié	Cameroon	6.19	
6	Brenda Faluada	Nigeria	6.07	
7	Maty Salame	Senegal	5.98	
8	Moufida Anime	Algeria	5.94	
9	Tiyana Fatou	Gambia	5.36	
10	Florence Lineo Shoa	Lesotho	5.26	
	Pamela Mouele Mboussi	Republic of the Congo	DNS	
	Nana Blakime	Togo	DNS	
