= Oluoma Nwoke =

Nigerian sprinter

Personal information
- Full name: Precious Oluoma Nwoke Bichiri
- Nationality: Nigeria
- Born: 16 July 1987 (age 38) Abuja, Nigeria
- Weight: 65 kg (143 lb)

Sport
- Sport: Athletics
- Event: 4×400 m relay
- Club: NCSDC Abuja
Medal record
Women's athletics
Representing Nigeria
African Championships
Gold medal – first place	2008 Addis Ababa	4×400 m

Precious Oluoma Nwoke Bichiri (born 16 July 1987 in Abuja) is a Nigerian track and field athlete, who specialized in the 400 metres. Nwoke competed for the women's 4 × 400 m relay at the 2008 Summer Olympics in Beijing, along with her teammates Folashade Abugan, Joy Amechi Eze, and Muizat Ajoke Odumosu. She ran on the third leg of the second heat, with an individual-split time of 51.83 seconds. She and her team finished the relay in fourth place for a seasonal best time of 3:24.10, giving them a qualifying slot for the final round based on performance. By the following day, Nwoke and her team placed seventh in the finals, with another seasonal best time of 3:23.74.
