= Vida Anim =

Ghanaian sprinter (born 1983)

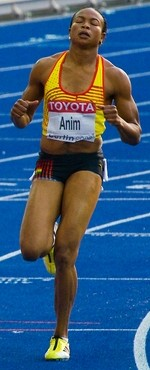
- Anim in 2009

Personal information
- Nationality: Ghanaian
- Born: 7 December 1983 (age 42) Accra, Ghana
- Height: 1.62 m (5 ft 4 in)
- Weight: 63 kg (9.9 st; 139 lb)

Sport
- Country: Ghana
- Sport: Track and Field
- Event(s): 100 m, 200 m, 4x100 m

Achievements and titles
- Personal best(s): 60 m : 7.18 sec (2004); 100 m: 11.14 sec (2004, NR); 200 m:22.81 sec (2006)
Medal record
Women's athletics
Representing Ghana
All-Africa Games
Gold medal – first place	2007 Algiers	4×100 m
Silver medal – second place	2003 Abuja	200 m
Silver medal – second place	2007 Algiers	200 m
Silver medal – second place	2011 Maputo	200 m
Bronze medal – third place	2003 Abuja	100 m
Bronze medal – third place	2007 Algiers	100 m
African Championships
Gold medal – first place	2000 Algiers	4×100 m
Gold medal – first place	2006 Bambous	100 m
Gold medal – first place	2006 Bambous	200 m
Gold medal – first place	2006 Bambous	4×100 m
Silver medal – second place	2008 Addis Ababa	100 m
Silver medal – second place	2008 Addis Ababa	4×100 m
World Junior Championships
Bronze medal – third place	2000 Santiago	200 m

Vida Anim (born 7 December 1983) is a Ghanaian sprinter who specializes in the 100 and 200 metres. Together with Mavis Akoto, Monica Twum and Vida Nsiah she holds the Ghanaian record in 4 x 100 metres relay with 43.19 seconds, achieved during the heats at the 2000 Summer Olympics in Sydney.

Vida Anim represented Ghana at the 2008 Summer Olympics in Beijing competing at the 100 metres sprint. In her first round heat she placed second behind Shelly-Ann Fraser in a time of 11.47 to advance to the second round. There she improved her time to 11.32 seconds, finishing third behind Debbie Ferguson and Oludamola Osayomi. She was unable to qualify for the final as her time of 11.51 in the semi-finals was only the eighth and last time of her heat.

== Competition record ==
Year	Competition	Venue	Position	Event	Notes
Representing Ghana
1999	All-Africa Games	Johannesburg, South Africa	8th	200 m	23.81
2000	African Championships	Algiers, Algeria	1st	4 × 100 m relay	43.99
2000	Olympic Games	Sydney, Australia	9th (sf)	4 × 100 m relay	43.19 (NR)
2000	World Junior Championships	Santiago, Chile	4th	100 m	11.58 (wind: +2.0 m/s)
2000	World Junior Championships	Santiago, Chile	3rd	200 m	23.81 (wind: +0.7 m/s)
2002	Commonwealth Games	Manchester, United Kingdom	21st (h)	100 m	12.27
2003	All-Africa Games	Abuja, Nigeria	3rd	100 m	11.29
2003	All-Africa Games	Abuja, Nigeria	2nd	200 m	23.17
2003	World Championships	Paris, France	13th (qf)	100 m	11.29
2003	World Championships	Paris, France	14th (sf)	200 m	23.16
2004	World Indoor Championships	Budapest, Hungary	11th (sf)	60 m	7.25
2004	Olympic Games	Athens, Greece	31st (qf)	100 m	DNF
2005	World Championships	Helsinki, Finland	17th (qf)	100 m	11.41
2005	World Championships	Helsinki, Finland	19th (h)	200 m	24.16
2006	Commonwealth Games	Melbourne, Australia	12th (sf)	100 m	11.51
2006	Commonwealth Games	Melbourne, Australia	6th	200 m	23.34
2006	African Championships	Bambous, Mauritius	1st	100 m	11.58
2006	African Championships	Bambous, Mauritius	1st	200 m	22.90
2006	African Championships	Bambous, Mauritius	1st	4 × 100 m relay	44.43
2006	World Cup	Athens, Greece	3rd	100 m	11.21
2006	World Cup	Athens, Greece	3rd	200 m	22.81 PB
2006	World Cup	Athens, Greece	3rd	4 × 100 m relay	43.61
2007	All-Africa Games	Algiers, Algeria	3rd	100 m	11.33
2007	All-Africa Games	Algiers, Algeria	2nd	200 m	23.29
2007	All-Africa Games	Algiers, Algeria	1st	4 × 100 m relay	43.84
2007	World Championships	Osaka, Japan	20th (qf)	100 m	11.36
2007	World Championships	Osaka, Japan	26th (qf)	200 m	23.47
2007	World Championships	Osaka, Japan	12th (h)	4 × 100 m relay	43.76
2008	World Indoor Championships	Valencia, Spain	22nd (sf)	60 m	7.45
2008	African Championships	Addis Ababa, Ethiopia	2nd	100 m	11.43
2008	African Championships	Addis Ababa, Ethiopia	6th (sf)	200 m	23.76
2008	African Championships	Addis Ababa, Ethiopia	2nd	4 × 100 m relay	44.12
2008	Olympic Games	Beijing, China	15th (sf)	100 m	11.51
2009	World Championships	Berlin, Germany	13th (sf)	100 m	11.43
2009	World Championships	Berlin, Germany	20th (sf)	200 m	23.36
2011	All-Africa Games	Maputo, Mozambique	4th	100 m	11.37
2011	All-Africa Games	Maputo, Mozambique	2nd	200 m	23.06
2012	World Indoor Championships	Istanbul, Turkey	18th (sf)	60 m	7.36
2012	Olympic Games	London, United Kingdom	43rd (h)	200 m	23.71

=== Personal bests ===
- 60 metres – 7.18 s (2004, indoor)
- 100 metres – 11.14 s (2004) – national record
- 200 metres – 22.81 s (2006) – national record is 22.80 s

Olympic Games
Preceded by Andrew Owusu	Flagbearer for Ghana; 2008 Beijing	Succeeded by Kwame Nkrumah-Acheampong
