= 2004 African Championships in Athletics – Women's high jump =

The women's high jump event at the 2004 African Championships in Athletics was held in Brazzaville, Republic of the Congo on July 14.

== Results ==
Rank	Name	Nationality	Result	Notes
1st place, gold medalist(s)	Hestrie Cloete	South Africa	1.95	
2nd place, silver medalist(s)	Samantha Dodd	South Africa	1.60	
3rd place, bronze medalist(s)	Janice Josephs	South Africa	1.50	
