= Ene Franca Idoko =

Nigerian sprinter

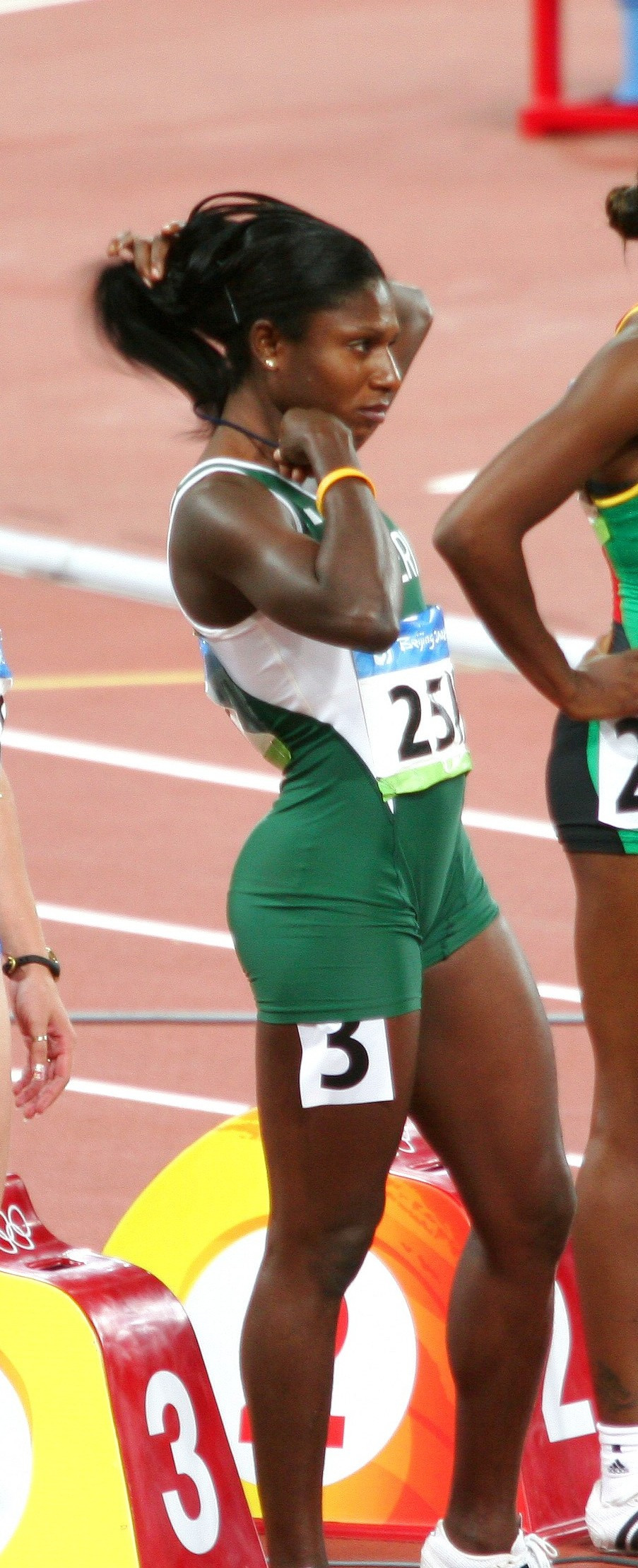
- Ene Franca Idoko

Medal record

Women's athletics

Representing Nigeria

African Championships
Silver medal – second place	2006 Bambous	4×100 m

Ene Francisca “Franca” Idoko-Isaac (born 15 June 1985, in Benue State) is a Nigerian sprinter who specializes in the 100 metres. Her personal best time over 100 m is 11.14 seconds, achieved in July 2008 in Abuja. Her personal best time over 60 m is 7.09 seconds, achieved in February 2008 in Chemnitz. Thus, Ene was known as Olympic Games Silver medallist, African Championships Silver medallist and Olympic Games finalist.

== Married life ==
Ene France Idoko married Uche Isaac, who is also a Nigerian sprinter. She then changed her name to Franca Idoko-Isaac. She left sports, which has been part of her for ten years, when she became pregnant. Idoko-Isaac had a baby boy named Chris Uche Isaac and stayed away from sports for two years to nurse her baby.

== Career in sports ==
Ene won the bronze medal with the African 4 × 100 metres relay team at the 2006 IAAF World Cup. In 60 metres she finished seventh at the 2008 IAAF World Indoor Championships. At the 2008 African Championships she finished fourth in the 100 metres. At the 2008 Summer Olympics in Beijing she competed at the 100 metres sprint. In her first round heat she placed fourth, normally causing elimination, but her time of 11.61 seconds was among the ten fastest losing times, which gave her a spot in the second round. There she failed to qualify for the semi-finals as her time of 11.66 was only the seventh time of her heat.

Together with Gloria Kemasuode, Agnes Osazuwa and Oludamola Osayomi she also took part in the 4 × 100 metres relay. In their first round heat they placed fourth behind Belgium, Great Britain and Brazil. Their time of 43.43 seconds was the best non-directly qualifying time and the sixth time overall out of sixteen participating nations. With this result they qualified for the final in which they replaced Osazuwa with Halimat Ismaila. They sprinted to a time of 43.04 seconds, a third place and a bronze medal behind Russia and Belgium. In 2016, the Russian team was disqualified and stripped of their gold medal due to doping violations by one of the Russian runners, Yuliya Chermoshanskaya, thereby promoting Nigeria to the silver medal position. Ene Franca Idoko said “It is a great feeling, having a bronze medal before and now silver. She is also excited to be addressed as an Olympics silver medalist.

== Achievements ==
Year	Competition	Venue	Position	Event	Notes
Representing Nigeria
2006	African Championships	Bambous, Mauritius	2nd	4 × 100 m relay	44.52
2007	All-Africa Games	Algiers, Algeria	4th	100 m	11.46
2007	All-Africa Games	Algiers, Algeria	2nd	4 × 100 m relay	43.85
2007	World Championships	Osaka, Japan	11th (h)	4 × 100 m relay	43.58
2008	World Indoor Championships	Valencia, Spain	7th	60 m	7.30
2008	African Championships	Addis Ababa, Ethiopia	4th	100 m	11.47
2008	Olympic Games	Beijing, China	35th (qf)	100 m	11.66
2008	Olympic Games	Beijing, China	2nd	4 × 100 m relay	43.04
