= Maty Salame =

Senegalese sprinter and long jumper

Medal record

Women's athletics

Representing Senegal

African Championships
Bronze medal – third place	2008 Addis Ababa	4×400 m

Maty Salame (born 9 November 1983) is a Senegalese sprinter and long jumper. Active internationally from 2006 to 2008 and best known as a relay runner, she won a bronze medal and has three fourth-place finishes from African continental championships.

== Sprints ==
She competed in the 100 metres at the 2005 Summer Universiade, the 2007 Summer Universiade and the 2007 All-Africa Games without reaching the final.

In relay races, she finished fourth at the 2006 African Championships as well as the 2007 All-Africa Games. At the 2008 African Championships she finished fourth in the 4 × 100 metres relay and won a bronze medal in the 4 × 400 metres relay.

== Jumps ==
In the long jump, she finished eighth at the 2006 African Championships, seventh at the 2007 All-Africa Games and seventh at the 2008 African Championships. She also competed at the 2005 Summer Universiade and the 2007 Summer Universiade without reaching the final. Her personal best jump was 6.07 metres, achieved in June 2007 in Dakar.

In the triple jump, she finished ninth at the 2006 African Championships.
