= Gifty Addy =

Ghanaian sprinter

Medal record

Women's athletics

Representing Ghana

African Championships
Gold medal – first place	2006 Bambous	4×100 m
Silver medal – second place	2008 Addis Ababa	4×100 m
Bronze medal – third place	2002 Radès	4×100 m

Gifty Addy (born 19 January 1984 in Accra) is a Ghanaian sprinter who specializes in the 200 metres.

== Achievements ==
Year	Competition	Venue	Position	Event	Notes
Representing Ghana
2001	World Youth Championships	Debrecen, Hungary	10th (sf)	200 m	24.50
2002	African Championships	Radès, Tunisia	3rd	4 × 100 m relay	47.41
2004	African Championships	Brazzaville, Republic of the Congo	12th (sf)	200 m	24.69
2004	African Championships	Brazzaville, Republic of the Congo	5th	4 × 100 m relay	46.07
2006	Commonwealth Games	Melbourne, Australia	22nd (sf)	100 m	11.92
2006	Commonwealth Games	Melbourne, Australia	17th (h)	200 m	24.18
2006	African Championships	Bambous, Mauritius	10th (h)	200 m	24.66
2006	African Championships	Bambous, Mauritius	1st	4 × 100 m relay	44.43
2007	All-Africa Games	Algiers, Algeria	13th (sf)	100 m	11.85
2007	All-Africa Games	Algiers, Algeria	1st	4 × 100 m relay	43.84
2007	World Championships	Osaka, Japan	12th (h)	4 × 100 m relay	43.76
2008	African Championships	Addis Ababa, Ethiopia	10th (sf)	100 m	11.78
2008	African Championships	Addis Ababa, Ethiopia	10th (sf)	200 m	24.12
2008	African Championships	Addis Ababa, Ethiopia	2nd	4 × 100 m relay	44.12

=== Personal bests ===
- 100 metres - 11.82 s (2007)
- 200 metres - 24.18 s (2006)
- 400 metres - 54.00 s
