= Joséphine Mbarga-Bikié =

Cameroonian long jumper (born 1979)

Medal record

Women's athletics

Representing Cameroon

African Championships
Gold medal – first place	2006 Bambous	Long jump
Bronze medal – third place	2006 Bambous	4×100 m

Joséphine Mbarga-Bikié (born 3 April 1979) is a Cameroonian long jumper.

== Achievements ==
Year	Competition	Venue	Position	Event	Notes
Representing Cameroon
2003	Universiade	Daegu, South Korea	12th	Long jump	5.65 m
2004	African Championships	Brazzaville, Republic of the Congo	4th	Long jump	6.06 m
2005	Universiade	İzmir, Turkey	25th (q)	Long jump	5.80 m
2005	Jeux de la Francophonie	Niamey, Niger	5th	4 × 100 m relay	46.72
2005	Jeux de la Francophonie	Niamey, Niger	4th	4 × 400 m relay	3:46.38
2005	Jeux de la Francophonie	Niamey, Niger	5th	Long jump	6.12 m
2006	African Championships	Bambous, Mauritius	3rd	4 × 100 m relay	46.43
2006	African Championships	Bambous, Mauritius	1st	Long jump	6.33 m
2006	World Cup	Athens, Greece	9th	Long jump	5.87 m
2007	All-Africa Games	Algiers, Algeria	5th	Long jump	6.19 m
2009	Jeux de la Francophonie	Beirut, Lebanon	3rd	4 × 100 m relay	46.24
2009	Jeux de la Francophonie	Beirut, Lebanon	7th	Long jump	6.04 m
