= 2006 African Championships in Athletics – Women's long jump =

The women's long jump event at the 2006 African Championships in Athletics was held at the Stade Germain Comarmond on August 10.

== Results ==
Rank	Name	Nationality	#1	#2	#3	#4	#5	#6	Result	Notes
1st place, gold medalist(s)	Joséphine Mbarga-Bikié	Cameroon	–	5.86	5.98	5.86	6.33w	5.99	6.33w	
2nd place, silver medalist(s)	Kéné Ndoye	Senegal	4.23	x	6.30	6.23	6.25	6.27	6.30	
3rd place, bronze medalist(s)	Chinaza Amadi	Nigeria	6.14w	6.03	4.47	6.23w	6.06	6.07w	6.23w	
4	Yah Soucko Koïta	Mali	5.81	5.92	6.10	6.23w	5.98	6.13w	6.23w	
5	Chinedu Odozor	Nigeria	5.58	5.95	5.99	5.91	5.89	6.01	6.01	
6	Céline Laporte	Seychelles	5.91	5.75	5.93	6.01w	5.83	5.84	6.01w	
7	Doyana Jolicoeur	Mauritius	5.70w	5.42	5.26	5.47	5.52	5.57w	5.70w	
8	Maty Salame	Senegal	5.41	5.66w	5.61	5.63w	5.51	x	5.66w	
	Estelle Brou	Ivory Coast							DNS	
	Béatrice Kamboulé	Burkina Faso							DNS	
	Karin Mey	South Africa							DNS	
