= 2004 African Championships in Athletics – Women's heptathlon =

The women's heptathlon event at the 2004 African Championships in Athletics was held in Brazzaville, Republic of the Congo on July 14–15.

== Results ==
The highest mark recorded in each event is highlighted in yellow

Rank	Athlete	Nationality	100m H	HJ	SP	200m	LJ	JT	800m	Points	Notes
1st place, gold medalist(s)	Margaret Simpson	Ghana	13.62	1.76	12.87	24.54	6.07	56.29	2:30.10	6154	
2nd place, silver medalist(s)	Janice Josephs	South Africa	13.72	1.67	12.38	23.51	5.97	41.89	2:30.13	5785	
3rd place, bronze medalist(s)	Céline Laporte	Seychelles	13.91	1.67	9.92	25.53	5.53	38.06	2:32.59	5172	
4	Stéphanie Domaingue	Mauritius	15.26	1.52	10.12	27.49	5.24	37.78	2:43.82	4442	
