= Aminata Diouf =

Senegalese sprinter

Personal information
- Born: 18 February 1977 (age 49)

Sport
- Sport: Track and field
Medal record
Representing Senegal
African Games
Bronze medal – third place	2003 Abuja	4x100m relay
African Championships
Silver medal – second place	1998 Dakar	4×400 m relay
Silver medal – second place	2000 Algiers	4×100 m relay
Bronze medal – third place	2004 Brazzaville	4×100 m relay

Aminata Diouf (born 18 February 1977) is a Senegalese athlete specialising in the sprinting events. She twice competed at the Olympic Games, in 2000 and 2004.

== Competition record ==
Year	Competition	Venue	Position	Event	Notes
Representing Senegal
1995	African Junior Championships	Bouaké, Ivory Coast	6th	100 m	12.56
1995	African Junior Championships	Bouaké, Ivory Coast	5th	200 m	25.43
1999	Universiade	Palma de Mallorca, Spain	6th	100 m	11.37
1999	Universiade	Palma de Mallorca, Spain	4th	200 m	23.37
1999	Universiade	Palma de Mallorca, Spain	10th (h)	4 × 100 m relay	47.21
1999	World Championships	Seville, Spain	38th (h)	100 m	11.65
1999	World Championships	Seville, Spain	10th (h)	4 × 400 m relay	3:30.99
1999	All-Africa Games	Johannesburg, South Africa	10th (sf)	100 m	11.81
2000	African Championships	Algiers, Algeria	2nd	4 × 100 m relay	44.62
2000	Olympic Games	Sydney, Australia	46th (h)	100 m	11.65
2000	Olympic Games	Sydney, Australia	13th (h)	4 × 400 m relay	3:28.02
2001	Universiade	Beijing, China	11th (sf)	200 m	24.02
2002	African Championships	Radès, Tunisia	5th (h)	100 m	11.37
2003	World Championships	Paris, France	7th (h)	4 × 400 m relay	3:28.37
2003	All-Africa Games	Abuja, Nigeria	8th (sf)	100 m	11.58
2003	All-Africa Games	Abuja, Nigeria	3rd	4 × 100 m relay	45.42
2004	African Championships	Brazzaville, Republic of the Congo	5th (sf)	200 m	23.34
2004	African Championships	Brazzaville, Republic of the Congo	3rd	4 × 100 m relay	45.21
2004	Olympic Games	Athens, Greece	16th (h)	4 × 400 m relay	3:35.18
2005	World Championships	Helsinki, Finland	9th (h)	4 × 400 m relay	3:29.03
2006	African Championships	Bambous, Mauritius	4th	4 × 100 m relay	47.22
2007	All-Africa Games	Algiers, Algeria	10th (sf)	100 m	11.67
2007	All-Africa Games	Algiers, Algeria	11th (sf)	200 m	23.92
2007	All-Africa Games	Algiers, Algeria	4th	4 × 100 m relay	45.26
2008	African Championships	Addis Ababa, Ethiopia	3rd (sf)	100 m	11.46
2008	African Championships	Addis Ababa, Ethiopia	5th (h)	4 × 100 m relay	45.70

== Personal bests ==
Outdoor

- 100 metres – 11.24 (+1.5 m/s) (La Chaux-de-Fonds 1999) NR
- 200 metres – 22.90 (+0.4 m/s) (Dijon 1998)
- 400 metres – 55.19 (Celle Ligure 2005)

Indoor

- 60 metres – 7.42 (Eaubonne 1999)
- 200 metres – 24.24 (Reims 2004)
