= 2006 African Championships in Athletics – Women's heptathlon =

The women's heptathlon event at the 2006 African Championships in Athletics was held at the Stade Germain Comarmond on August 11–12.

== Medalists ==
Gold	Silver	Bronze
Janice Josephs; South Africa	Céline Laporte; Seychelles	Nadège Essama Foe; Cameroon

== Results ==
=== 100 metres hurdles ===
Wind: -3.3 m/s

Rank	Lane	Name	Nationality	Time	Points	Notes
1	4	Janice Josephs	South Africa	14.32	934	
2	2	Céline Laporte	Seychelles	15.21	814	
3	3	Lamiae Lhabze	Morocco	15.69	753	
4	5	Nadège Essama Foe	Cameroon	19.84	316	

=== High jump ===
Rank	Athlete	Nationality	1.30	1.33	1.36	1.39	1.42	1.45	1.48	1.51	1.60	1.63	1.66	1.69	1.72	1.75	Result	Points	Notes	Total
1	Janice Josephs	South Africa	–	–	–	–	–	–	–	–	–	o	o	xo	o	xxx	1.72	879		1813
2	Céline Laporte	Seychelles	–	–	–	–	–	–	–	xxo	xo	–	xxx				1.60	736		1550
3	Lamiae Lhabze	Morocco	o	o	o	o	o	o	xxx								1.45	566		1319
4	Nadège Essama Foe	Cameroon	o	o	xo	o	xxx										1.39	502		818

=== Shot put ===
Rank	Athlete	Nationality	#1	#2	#3	Result	Points	Notes	Total
1	Nadège Essama Foe	Cameroon	11.68	12.27	12.51	12.51	695		1513
2	Janice Josephs	South Africa	11.39	10.39	11.02	11.39	621		2434
3	Céline Laporte	Seychelles	9.95	9.74	9.93	9.95	526		2076
	Lamiae Lhabze	Morocco	x	x	x	NM	0		1319

=== 200 metres ===
Wind: -3.9 m/s

Rank	Lane	Name	Nationality	Time	Points	Notes	Total
1	4	Janice Josephs	South Africa	24.22	960		3394
2	5	Nadège Essama Foe	Cameroon	25.45	846		2359
3	3	Lamiae Lhabze	Morocco	26.20	780		2099
4	2	Céline Laporte	Seychelles	26.45	758		2834

=== Long jump ===
Rank	Athlete	Nationality	#1	#2	#3	Result	Points	Notes	Total
1	Janice Josephs	South Africa	6.10	x	6.54	6.54	1020		4414
2	Céline Laporte	Seychelles	5.91w			5.91w	822		3656
3	Nadège Essama Foe	Cameroon	4.37w	4.33w	4.34w	4.37w	396		2755
	Lamiae Lhabze	Morocco				DNS	0		DNF

=== Javelin throw ===
Rank	Athlete	Nationality	#1	#2	#3	Result	Points	Notes	Total
1	Janice Josephs	South Africa	x	40.68	34.55	40.68	680		5094
2	Céline Laporte	Seychelles	x	36.61	31.83	36.61	602		4258
3	Nadège Essama Foe	Cameroon	28.95	21.24	22.80	28.95	457		3212

=== 800 metres ===
Rank	Name	Nationality	Time	Points	Notes
1	Janice Josephs	South Africa	2:23.11	782	
2	Céline Laporte	Seychelles	2:31.55	674	
3	Nadège Essama Foe	Cameroon	2:38.00	596	

=== Final standings ===
The highest mark recorded in each event is highlighted in yellow

Rank	Athlete	Nationality	100m H	HJ	SP	200m	LJ	JT	800m	Points	Notes
1st place, gold medalist(s)	Janice Josephs	South Africa	14.32	1.72	11.39	24.22	6.54	40.68	2:23.11	5876	
2nd place, silver medalist(s)	Céline Laporte	Seychelles	15.21	1.60	9.95	26.45	5.91w	36.61	2:31.55	4932	
3rd place, bronze medalist(s)	Nadège Essama Foe	Cameroon	19.84	1.39	12.51	25.45	4.37w	28.95	2:38.00	3808	
	Lamiae Lhabze	Morocco	15.69	1.45	NM	26.20	DNS	–	–	DNF	
