= Samantha Dodd =

Athlete

Personal information
- Nationality: South African
- Born: 13 August 1979 (age 46)

Sport
- Sport: Athletics
- Event: pole vault

Achievements and titles
- Personal best: Pole Vault: 4.15 m (2006)
Medal record
Women's athletics
Representing South Africa
African Championships
Silver medal – second place	2004 Brazzaville	High jump
Silver medal – second place	2004 Brazzaville	Pole vault

Samantha Dodd (born 13 August 1979) is a South African retired track and field athlete who competed in the pole vault. Dodd was the pole vault champion at the 2003 All-Africa Games, and finished second in the pole vault and high jump at the 2004 African Championships.

== Statistics ==
=== Personal bests ===
Event	Mark	Competition	Venue	Date
High jump	1.75 m		Bellville, South Africa	28 February 1998
Pole vault	4.15 m		Pretoria, South Africa	27 January 2006

=== International competitions ===
Year	Competition	Venue	Position	Event	Notes
Representing South Africa
2004	African Championships	Brazzaville, Congo	2nd	Pole Vault	3.80 m
2004	African Championships	Brazzaville, Congo	2nd	High Jump	1.60 m
2003	All-African Games	Abuja, Nigeria	1st	Pole Vault	3.90 m

=== National titles ===
- South African Athletics Championships
  - Pole vault: 2003, 2004, 2006
