= Fatoumata Coulibaly =

Malian activist and actress

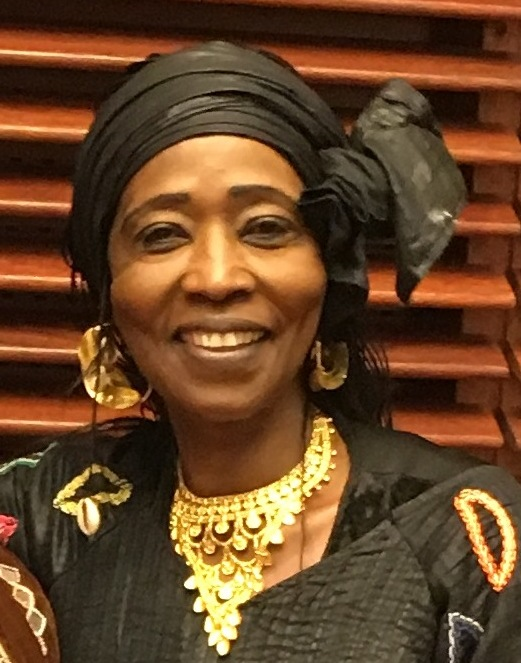
- Coulibaly in 2017
- Born: Mali
- Occupations: Actress, director, journalist, women's right activist

Fatoumata Coulibaly is a Malian film actress, director, journalist, and women's rights activist, particularly against female genital mutilation (FGM).

== Early life ==
Coulibaly comes from a family of musicians, and her grandmother Bazéko Traoré was a singer and musician from the Sikasso region, where Coulibaly comes from.

== Career ==
Coulibaly first worked as a radio journalist and announcer in Mali, before she had an idea for a play, and went to see the director Ousmane Sow, who suggested that she try writing it as a film script, as did Cheick Oumar Sissoko.

Coulibaly first attracted international attention with her role in the 1997 film N'Golo dit Papa.

Coulibaly played the lead role in the 2004 film Moolaadé from the Senegalese writer and director Ousmane Sembène. Coulibaly starred as Collé Gallo Ardo Sy, her husband's second of three wives, in a village in Burkina Faso, who uses moolaadé ("magical protection") to try to protect girls from female genital mutilation (FGM). Coulibaly herself has been a victim of female genital mutilation. The critic Roger Ebert gave the film four stars (out of four), writing "for me the best film at Cannes 2004, a story vibrating with urgency and life. It makes a powerful statement and at the same time contains humor, charm and astonishing visual beauty". Coulibaly won the Best Actress award for her role as Collé, at the Cinemanila International Film Festival in 2005. This film had an important role in raising wider awareness of FGM, and Coulibaly has continued to campaign on this issue since then. Her campaign against FGM has been documented in the film Africa on the Move: The Power of Song (2010).

Coulibaly has appeared in numerous films, television series and plays.

As of 2016, Coulibaly works for the Office de radiodiffusion télévision du Mali (Office of Broadcasting Television of Mali) (ORTM).

== Filmography ==
- Guimba the Tyrant (1995)
- N'Golo dit Papa (1997)
- Aphrodite, the Garden of the Perfumes (1998)
- Moolaadé (2004), actress
- Africa on the Move: The Power of the Song (2010)
- Tourbillon à Bamako (2012)
