= Cynthia Niako =

Ivorian sprinter

Evelyne-Cynthia Niako (born 25 September 1983) is a Côte d'Ivoire sprinter who specializes in the 100 and 200 metres.

Niako competed for the Florida State Seminoles track and field team in the NCAA.

She finished seventh in the 200 metres at the 2006 African Championships, and won a bronze medal in the 4 x 100 metres relay at the 2007 All-Africa Games.

== Personal bests ==
- 100 metres - 11.34 s (2006)
- 200 metres - 23.14 s (2006)
