= Joy Nakhumicha Sakari =

Kenyan sprinter

Personal information
- Born: June 6, 1986 (age 40)
- Height: 1.7 m (5 ft 7 in)
- Weight: 60 kg (130 lb)

Sport
- Country: Kenya
- Sport: Athletics
- Event: 400m
Medal record
Women's athletics
Representing Kenya
African Championships
Silver medal – second place	2008 Addis Ababa	4×400 m

Joy Nakhumicha Sakari (born 6 June 1986 in Chepkoya, Kenya) is a Kenyan sprinter who specializes in the 400 metres. She represented Kenya at the 2012 Summer Olympics.

One day after improving the Kenyan record at the 2015 World Championships, she failed a doping test.
