= Geraldine Pillay =

South African retired sprinter

Medal record

Women's athletics

Representing South Africa

African Championships
Gold medal – first place	2002 Radès	4×100 m
Gold medal – first place	2004 Brazzaville	200 m
Silver medal – second place	2004 Brazzaville	4×100 m
Silver medal – second place	2006 Bambous	100 m
Silver medal – second place	2006 Bambous	200 m
Bronze medal – third place	2004 Brazzaville	100 m
Bronze medal – third place	2008 Addis Ababa	4×100 m

Geraldine Pillay (born 25 August 1977) is a South African retired sprinter who specialized in the 100 and 200 metres.

== Early life and career ==
Pillay competed at various African Championships, two Olympic Games (2004 and 2008), and two Commonwealth Games.

== Later life ==
Since retiring from competition, Pillay has become involved in mentoring future generations of South African athletes. She has been critical of Team South Africa's performance at the 2023 World Athletics Championships, calling for improved athlete support and development. She is now a teacher and Coach at St Benedict's College, Bedfordview

== Achievements ==
- 2008 African Championships – sixth place (100 metres), fourth place (200 metres), bronze medal (4×100 metres relay)
- 2006 African Championships – silver medal (200 metres)
- 2006 Commonwealth Games – silver medal (100 metres), bronze medal (200 metres)
- 2004 African Championships – bronze medal (100 metres), gold medal (200 metres)

Discipline	Performance	Venue	Date
60 m	7.38	Boston, MA(USA)	20 January 2002
60 m	7.38	Allston, MA(USA)	20 January 2002
100 m	11.07	Durban(RSA)	16 April 2005
200 m	22.80	Pretoria(RSA	18 Mart 2005
200 m	22.78	Durban(RSA)	16 April 2005
200 m (Short Track)	24.87	Boston, MA(USA)	1 December 2001
400 m	56.12	Kingston(JAM)	17 February 2007
