= Delphine Atangana =

Cameroonian sprinter (born 1984)

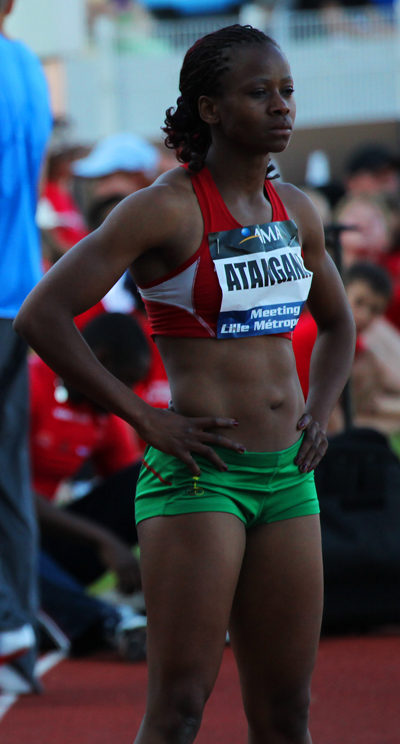
- Delphine Atangana

Medal record

Women's athletics

Representing Cameroon

African Championships
| Silver medal – second place | 2010 Nairobi | 4×100 m |
| Bronze medal – third place | 2004 Brazzaville | 4×400 m |
| Bronze medal – third place | 2008 Addis Ababa | 100 m |

Delphine Bertille Atangana (born 16 August 1984 in Yaoundé) is a Cameroonian sprinter who specialized in the 100 metres.

At the 2006 Commonwealth Games she won the bronze medal in the 100 metres and finished seventh in the 200 metres. She also competed at the 2004 Olympic Games, the 2005 World Championships, the 2008 World Indoor Championships, the 2011 World Championships, the 2012 World Indoor Championships and the 2012 Summer Olympics without reaching the final. She won the gold in the 200 m at the Afro-Asian Games.

Her personal best time is 11.24 seconds, achieved in October 2003 in Abuja. She has 23.26 seconds in the 200 metres, achieved in April 2003 in Bron, and 7.19 seconds in the 60 metres, achieved in February 2006 in Aubière. She also holds the national record in 4 x 400 metres relay with 3:27.08 minutes, achieved together with teammates Mireille Nguimgo, Carole Kaboud Mebam and Hortense Béwouda at the 2003 World Championships in Paris.
