= 2008 African Championships in Athletics =

2008 African Championships
- Dates: 30 April – 4 May
- Host city: Addis Ababa, Ethiopia
- Venue: Addis Ababa Stadium
- Events: 44
- Participation: 543 athletes from 42 nations

The 16th African Championships in Athletics was held in Addis Ababa, the capital city of Ethiopia, from April 30 to May 4, 2008. The competition venue was the Addis Ababa Stadium. It is the largest Athletics event held in Ethiopia to date. It was the first time in its then 29-year history the African Championships in Athletics were held in Eastern Africa, despite the region's well-documented success in long-distance running.

In the men's 100 m, Nigerians Olusoji Fasuba and Uchenna Emedolu repeated the places from the 2006 edition. On April 30, there was a 35-minute delay to the men's 10,000 metres due to weather, but the Ethiopians dominated the podium and the race, with the missed absence of world champion Kenenisa Bekele.

== Men's results ==
=== Track ===
Event	Gold		Silver		Bronze	
100 m	Olusoji Fasuba; Nigeria	10.10 SB	Uchenna Emedolu; Nigeria	10.21 SB	Hannes Dreyer; South Africa	10.24 PB
200 m	Thuso Mpuang; South Africa	20.53 PB	Stéphan Buckland; Mauritius	20.62 SB	Samuel Kenosi; Botswana	20.72 NR
400 m	Ali Babiker Nagmeldin; Sudan	45.64 SB	Isaac Makwala; Botswana	45.64 PB	James Godday; Nigeria	45.77 SB
800 m	David Rudisha; Kenya	1:44.20 SB CR	Ismail Ahmed Ismail; Sudan	1:45.41 SB	Asbel Kiprop; Kenya	1:46.02
1500 m	Haron Keitany; Kenya	3:43.47	Gideon Gathimba; Kenya	3:43.56	Juan van Deventer; South Africa	3:43.63
5000 m	Kenenisa Bekele; Ethiopia	13:49.67	Isaac Songok; Kenya	13:49.91	Ali Abdosh; Ethiopia	13:50.64
10,000 m	Gebregziabher Gebremariam; Ethiopia	28:17.11 SB	Ibrahim Jeilan; Ethiopia	28:30.66 SB	Eshetu Wendimu; Ethiopia	28:56.36 SB
110 m hurdles	Hennie Kotze; South Africa	13.95	Samuel Okon; Nigeria	14.08	Selim Nurudeen; Nigeria	14.27
400 m hurdles	LJ van Zyl; South Africa	48.91 SB	Abderahmane Hammadi; Algeria	49.84 NR	Ibrahima Maïga; Mali	49.84 SB
3000 m s'chase	Richard Mateelong; Kenya	8:31.61	Michael Kipyego; Kenya	8:32.94	Willy Komen; Kenya	8:41.98
20 km walk	Mohamed Ameur; Algeria	1:22.55 PB	Hichem Medjeber; Algeria	1:23.29 PB	Hassanine Sebei; Tunisia	1:23.58 SB
4 × 100 m relay	Hannes Dreyer; Corne Du Plessis; Sergio Mullins; Thuso Mpuang; South Africa	38.75 CR	Togoh Victor; Allah Laryea-Akrong; Seth Amoo; Eric Nkansah; Ghana	40.30	Idrissa Adam; François Belinga; Alain Olivier Nyounai; Joseph Batangdon; Cameroon	40.60
4 × 400 m relay	Pieter Smith; Ockert Cilliers; Sibusiso Sishi; LJ van Zyl; South Africa	3:03.58	Rabah Yousif; Ali Babiker Nagmeldin; Ahmad Ismail; Abubaker Kaki; Sudan	3:04.00 NR	Mamadou Kasse Hann; Seth Mbow; Mamadou Gueye; Nouha Badji; Senegal	3:05.93
WR world record | AR area record | CR championship record | GR games record | NR national record | OR Olympic record | PB personal best | SB season best | WL world leading (in a given season)

=== Field ===
Event	Gold		Silver		Bronze	
High jump	Kabelo Kgosiemang; Botswana	2.34 NR =CR	Mohammed Benhadja; Algeria	2.18	Boubacar Séré; Burkina Faso	2.18 SB
Pole vault	Mouhcine Cheaouri; Morocco	4.80 PB	Larbi Bouraada; Algeria	4.50	Willem Coertzen; South Africa	4.00 PB
Long jump	Yahya Berrabah; Morocco	8.04 SB	Jonathan Chimier; Mauritius	7.99 SB	Stephan Louw; Namibia	7.98
Triple jump	Ndiss Kaba Badji; Senegal	17.07 NR	Hugo Mamba; Cameroon	16.92 NR	Tarik Bouguetaïb; Morocco	16.82
Shot put	Abdu Moaty Moustafa; Egypt	18.06	Yasser Ibrahim Farag; Egypt	17.39	Janus Robberts; South Africa	16.44
Discus throw	Hannes Hopley; South Africa	56.98	Yasser Ibrahim Farag; Egypt	56.06 SB	Nabil Kiram; Morocco	52.99
Hammer throw	Chris Harmse; South Africa	77.72 SB	Mostafa Al-Gamel; Egypt	69.70	Ahmed Abd El Raouf; Egypt	68.15
Javelin throw	Mohamed Ali Kebabou; Tunisia	74.20 PB	Kenechukwu Ezeofor; Nigeria	72.53 PB	Sammy Keskeny; Kenya	69.84 SB
Decathlon	Larbi Bouraada; Algeria	7574 PB	Willem Coertzen; South Africa	7374	Boualem Lamri; Algeria	6919 SB
WR world record | AR area record | CR championship record | GR games record | NR national record | OR Olympic record | PB personal best | SB season best | WL world leading (in a given season)

== Women's results ==
=== Track ===
Event	Gold		Silver		Bronze	
100 m	Damola Osayomi; Nigeria	11.22	Vida Anim; Ghana	11.43	Delphine Atangana; Cameroon	11.46
200 m	Isabel le Roux; South Africa	22.69 PB	Kadiatou Camara; Mali	22.70 NR	Damola Osayomi; Nigeria	22.83 PB
400 m	Amantle Montsho; Botswana	49.83 NR,CR	Sade Abugan; Nigeria	50.89	Racheal Nachula; Zambia	51.39 NR, NJR
800 m	Pamela Jelimo; Kenya	1:58.70 NJR	Maria de Lurdes Mutola; Mozambique	2:00.47 SB	Agnes Samaria; Namibia	2:00.62 SB
1500 m	Gelete Burka; Ethiopia	4:08.25	Meskerem Assefa; Ethiopia	4:10.40	Agnes Samaria; Namibia	4:13.91
5000 m	Meselech Melkamu; Ethiopia	15:49.81	Meseret Defar; Ethiopia	15:50.19	Grace Momanyi; Kenya	15:50.19
10,000 m	Tirunesh Dibaba; Ethiopia	32:49.08	Ejegayehu Dibaba; Ethiopia	32:50.36	Wude Ayalew; Ethiopia	32:55.17
100 m hurdles	Fatmata Fofanah; Guinea	13.10 NR	Toyin Augustus; Nigeria	13.12	Carole Kaboud Mebam; Cameroon	13.52
400 m hurdles	Joke Odumosu; Nigeria	55.92 SB	Lamiae Lhabze; Morocco	56.07 PB	Aïssata Soulama; Burkina Faso	56.13 SB
3000 m s'chase	Zemzem Ahmed; Ethiopia	9:44.58 PB	Mekdes Bekele; Ethiopia	9:59.52 SB	Ruth Bosibori; Kenya	10:00.18 SB
20 km walk	Grace Wanjiru; Kenya	1:39.50 NR	Ararissa Abissa Asnakch; Ethiopia	1:40.12 NR	Mary Njoki; Kenya	1:41.15 PB
4 × 100 m relay	Endurance Ojokolo; Gloria Kemasuode; Susan Akene; Damola Osayomi; Nigeria	43.79	Gifty Addy; Elizabeth Amolofo; Esther Dankwah; Vida Anim; Ghana	44.12	Tsholofelo Thipe; Isabel le Roux; Christine Ras; Geraldine Pillay; South Africa	44.28
4 × 400 m relay	Oluoma Nwoke; Sade Abugan; Endurance Abinuwa; Joy Eze; Nigeria	3:30.07	Florence Wasike; Charity Wandia; Joy Sakari; Pamela Jelimo; Kenya	3:37.67	Fatou Diabaye; Mame Fatou Faye; Maty Salame; Souma Fatou; Senegal	3:38.42
WR world record | AR area record | CR championship record | GR games record | NR national record | OR Olympic record | PB personal best | SB season best | WL world leading (in a given season)

=== Field ===
Event	Gold		Silver		Bronze	
High jump	Anika Smit; South Africa	1.88	Marcoleen Pretorius; South Africa	1.84	Marizca Gertenbach; South Africa	1.84
Pole vault	Leila Ben Youssef; Tunisia	4.00	Nisrine Dinar; Morocco	3.80	Laetitia Berthier; Burkina Faso	3.70
Long jump	Janice Josephs; South Africa	6.64	Chinaza Amadi; Nigeria	6.31	Patricia Soman; Ivory Coast	6.13
Triple jump	Françoise Mbango; Cameroon	14.76 SB	Yamilé Aldama; Sudan	14.36 SB	Chinonye Ohadugha; Nigeria	14.14 SB
Shot put	Vivian Chukwuemeka; Nigeria	17.50	Kasey Onmuchekwa; Nigeria	16.29	Veronica Abrahamse; South Africa	16.00
Discus throw	Elizna Naude; South Africa	55.34	Suzanne Kragbé; Ivory Coast	49.52	Simoné du Toit; South Africa	47.10
Hammer throw	Marwa Hussein; Egypt	62.26	Florence Ezeh; Togo	61.26	Funke Adeoye; Nigeria	57.02
Javelin throw	Sunette Viljoen; South Africa	55.17	Lindy Leveau-Agricole; Seychelles	52.92 SB	Hana'a Hassan Omar; Egypt	52.32
Heptathlon	Patience Okoro; Nigeria	4906	Florence Wasike; Kenya	4867	Nadege Essama Foe; Cameroon	4470
WR world record | AR area record | CR championship record | GR games record | NR national record | OR Olympic record | PB personal best | SB season best | WL world leading (in a given season)

== Medals table ==
Rank	Nation	Gold	Silver	Bronze	Total
1	South Africa (RSA)	12	2	8	22
2	Nigeria (NGR)	7	7	5	19
3	Ethiopia (ETH)	6	6	3	15
4	Kenya (KEN)	5	5	6	16
5	Algeria (ALG)	2	4	1	7
6	Egypt (EGY)	2	3	2	7
7	Morocco (MAR)	2	2	2	6
8	Botswana (BOT)	2	1	1	4
9	Tunisia (TUN)	2	0	1	3
10	Sudan (SUD)	1	3	0	4
11	Cameroon (CMR)	1	1	4	6
12	Senegal (SEN)	1	0	2	3
13	Guinea (GUI)	1	0	0	1
14	Ghana (GHA)	0	3	0	3
15	Mauritius (MRI)	0	2	0	2
16	Ivory Coast (CIV)	0	1	1	2
16	Mali (MLI)	0	1	1	2
18	Mozambique (MOZ)	0	1	0	1
18	Seychelles (SEY)	0	1	0	1
18	Togo (TOG)	0	1	0	1
21	Namibia (NAM)	0	0	3	3
22	Burkina Faso (BUR)	0	0	2	2
23	Burundi (BDI)	0	0	1	1
23	Zambia (ZAM)	0	0	1	1
Totals (24 entries)		44	44	44	132

== Participating nations ==
- Algeria (11)
- Benin (3)
- Botswana (14)
- Burkina Faso (10)
- Burundi (7)
- Cameroon (22)
- Cape Verde (1)
- Central African Republic (1)
- Chad (10)
- Comoros (1)
- Ivory Coast (10)
- Democratic Republic of the Congo (9)
- Djibouti (6)
- Egypt (18)
- Ethiopia (86)
- Gabon (1)
- Gambia (5)
- Ghana (22)
- Guinea (9)
- Kenya (39)
- Lesotho (3)
- Liberia (4)
- Madagascar (1)
- Malawi (2)
- Mali (10)
- Mauritius (9)
- Morocco (29)
- Mozambique (5)
- Namibia (7)
- Nigeria (45)
- Republic of the Congo (7)
- Rwanda (13)
- Senegal (12)
- Seychelles (2)
- Somalia (8)
- South Africa (55)
- Sudan (15)
- Tanzania (4)
- Togo (5)
- Tunisia (12)
- Uganda (7)
- Zambia (3)

== See also ==
- 2008 in athletics (track and field)
