= Myriam Léonie Mani =

Cameroonian sprinter

Personal information
- Nationality: Cameroon
- Born: May 21, 1977 (age 49)
- Occupation: Athlete

Sport
- Country: Cameroon
- Sport: 100 and 200 metres
Medal record
Women's athletics
Representing Cameroon
African Championships
Gold medal – first place	2000 Algiers	100 m
Gold medal – first place	2000 Algiers	200 m
Gold medal – first place	2000 Algiers	4×400 m
Gold medal – first place	2002 Radès	4×400 m
Silver medal – second place	1996 Yaoundé	4×400 m
Silver medal – second place	2002 Radès	100 m
Bronze medal – third place	1996 Yaoundé	100 m
Bronze medal – third place	1996 Yaoundé	200 m
Bronze medal – third place	1998 Dakar	4×400 m
Bronze medal – third place	2002 Radès	200 m

Myriam Léonie Mani (born May 21, 1977) is a Cameroonian athlete who specialized in the 100 and 200 metres.

Mani represented Cameroon at the 2008 Summer Olympics competing at the 100 metres sprint. In her first round heat she placed third behind Torri Edwards and Jeanette Kwakye in a time of 11.64 to advance to the second round. There she failed to qualify for the semi-finals as her time of 11.65 was only the sixth time of her heat, causing elimination.

== Achievements ==
- 2008 African Championships - seventh place (100 m), fifth place (200 m)
- 2006 African Championships - fifth place (100 m), eighth place (200 m)
- 2006 Commonwealth Games - eighth place (200 m)
- 2002 IAAF World Cup - bronze medal (200 m)
- 2002 African Championships - silver medal (100 m), bronze medal (200 m)
- 2001 IAAF Grand Prix Final - gold medal (200 m)
- 2001 World Championships - seventh place (200 m)
- 2000 African Championships - gold medal (100 m), gold medal (200 m)
- 1999 All-Africa Games - silver medal (100 m), silver medal (200 m)
- 1996 African Championships - bronze medal (100 m), bronze medal (200 m)

=== Personal bests ===
- 60 metres - 7.18 s (2000, indoor)
- 100 metres - 10.98 s (2001)
- 200 metres - 22.41 s (2000)
