= Athletics at the 2007 All-Africa Games =

Athletics at the IX All-Africa Games
- Dates: 18–22 July
- Host city: Algiers, Algeria
- Venue: Stade 5 Juillet 1962
- Events: 46
- Participation: 628 athletes from 50 nations
- Records set: 4 Games records

The athletics competition at the 2007 All-Africa Games was held on the Stade 5 Juillet 1962 in Algiers, Algeria between 18 July and 22 July 2007. Nigeria was the most successful nation of the competition having won nine golds and 24 medals in total. South Africa was a close second with seven golds and also a total of 24 medals overall. Tunisia and Botswana were the next most successful (both with five golds), although Ethiopia and Kenya had greater medal hauls.

== Men's results ==
=== Track ===
Event	Gold		Silver		Bronze	
100 m	Olusoji Fasuba; Nigeria	10.18	Eric Nkansah; Ghana	10.35	Uchenna Emedolu; Nigeria	10.37
100 m	July 19: The three athletes also shared the podium at the 2006 African Championships, with Fasuba defending the gold medal.					
200 m	Leigh Julius; South Africa	20.81	Seth Amoo; Ghana	20.88	Obinna Metu; Nigeria	20.94
200 m	July 22: Julius moved up from the bronze medal position at the 2006 African Championships.					
400 m	California Molefe; Botswana	45.59	Young Talkmore Nyongani; Zimbabwe	45.76	Mathieu Gnanligo; Benin	45.89
400 m	July 20: Molefe won Botswana's second gold medal at the Games, just shortly after Amantle Montsho took the women's 400 m title. Gnanligo won the first All-Africa Games athletics medal for Benin.					
800 m	Abubaker Kaki Khamis; Sudan	1:45.22	Mbulaeni Mulaudzi; South Africa	1:45.54	Justus Koech; Kenya	1:45.80
800 m	July 20: Big surprise victory as Kaki Khamis upset 2004 Olympic silver medallist Mulaudzi.					
1500 m	Asbel Kiprop; Kenya	3:38.97	Antar Zerguelaine; Algeria	3:39.04	Tarek Boukensa; Algeria	3:39.18
1500 m	July 22: Running on home track, Zerguelaine was narrowly beaten to second while Boukensa defended his position from the 2006 African Championships.					
5000 m	Moses Kipsiro; Uganda	13:12:51	Josphat Kiprono Menjo; Kenya	13:12.64	Tariku Bekele; Ethiopia	13:13.43
5000 m	July 22: Kipsiro won Uganda's first gold medal at the Games.					
10,000 m	Zersenay Tadese; Eritrea	27:00.30 GR	Tadesse Tola; Ethiopia	27:28.08	Gebregziabher Gebremariam; Ethiopia	27:41.24
10,000 m	July 19: Tadese won the first All-Africa Games athletics medal for Eritrea as the first non-Kenyan or Ethiopian to win a medal in the men's 10,000 metres. In addition, 27:00.30 was a new Games record. A number of Kenyans and Ethiopians were absent due to preparations for the 2007 World Championships.					
Half marathon	Deriba Merga; Ethiopia	1:02:24	Martin Sulle; Tanzania	1:03:01	Yonas Kifle; Eritrea	1:03:19
Half marathon	July 20					
110 m h	Salim Nurudeen; Nigeria	13.59 GR	Joseph-Berlioz Randriamihaja; Madagascar	13.72	Shaun Bownes; South Africa	13.81
110 m h	July 19: Nurudeen established a new Games record.					
400 m h	L.J. van Zyl; South Africa	48.74	Pieter De Villiers; South Africa	48.91	Alwyn Myburgh; South Africa	48.91
400 m h	July 21: South African dominance as De Villiers split van Zyl and Myburgh, winners of gold and silver respectively at the 2006 African Championships.					
3000 m s'chase	Willy Komen; Kenya	8:15.11	Ezekiel Kemboi; Kenya	8:16.93	Nahom Mesfin; Ethiopia	8:39.67
3000 m s'chase	July 18: The Kenyan dominance in the event continued as 2006 World Junior champion Komen upset 2004 Olympic champion Kemboi.					
20 km walk	Hatem Ghoula; Tunisia	1:22:33	David Kimutai; Kenya	1:24:16	Mohamed Ameur; Algeria	1:25:12
20 km walk	July 21					
4 x 100 m	Nigeria; Isaac Uche, Obinna Metu, Chinedu Oriala, Olusoji Fasuba	38.91	South Africa; Morne Nagel, Leigh Julius, Lee Roy Newton, Sherwin Vries	39.11	Zimbabwe; Ngonidzashe Makusha, Gabriel Mvumvure, Brian Dzingai, Lewis Banda	39.16 NR
4 x 100 m	July 20: Nigeria and South Africa defended their positions from the 2006 African Championships.					
4 x 400 m	Botswana; Zacharia Kamberuka, Isaac Makwala, Obakeng Ngwigwa, Tshepo Kelaotse	3:03.16	Nigeria; Olusegun Ogunkule, Edu Nkami, Victor Isaiah, Saul Weigopwa	3:03.99	Zimbabwe; Nelton Ndebele, Young Talkmore Nyongani, Gabriel Chikomo, Lewis Banda	3:04.84
4 x 400 m	July 22					
WR world record | AR area record | CR championship record | GR games record | NR national record | OR Olympic record | PB personal best | SB season best | WL world leading (in a given season)

=== Field ===
Event	Gold		Silver		Bronze	
High jump	Kabelo Kgosiemang; Botswana	2.27	Abderrahmane Hammad; Algeria	2.24	Mohamed Benhedia; Algeria; Arinze Obiora; Nigeria	2.20
High jump	July 22: Kosiemang defended his title from the 2006 African Championships, ahead of veteran Hammad.					
Pole vault	Abderrahmane Tamada; Tunisia	5.10	Karim Sène; Senegal	5.10	Hamdi Dhouibi; Tunisia	4.90
Pole vault	July 21: Tamada moved up one place from the 2006 African Championships, while decathlete Dhouibi defended his bronze medal from then. Only six athletes entered the competition.					
Long jump	Gable Garenamotse; Botswana	8.08 (+0.7)	Arnaud Casquette; Mauritius	8.03 (+1.4)	Khotso Mokoena; South Africa	7.99 (+0.6)
Long jump	July 22: A tight competition where Mokoena made it to the podium in his last jump, surpassing Issam Nima, before Garenamotse surpassed Casquette. Ignisious Gaisah did not start due to injury.					
Triple jump	Ndiss Kaba Badji; Senegal	16.80 (+0.0)	Hugo Mamba-Schlick; Cameroon	16.61 (+0.0)	Andrew Owusu; Ghana	16.32 (+1.0)
Triple jump	July 19: Khotso Mokoena exited the competition after three invalid attempts.					
Shot put	Yasser Fathy Ibrahim Farag; Egypt	19.20	Roelie Potgieter; South Africa	19.02	Mohammed Medded; Tunisia	17.94
Shot put	July 19: Farag, who also won the discus throw silver medal, retained his title from the 2006 African Championships.					
Discus	Omar Ahmed El Ghazaly; Egypt	62.28	Yasser Fathy Ibrahim Farag; Egypt	61.58	Hannes Hopley; South Africa	57.79
Discus	July 18: El Ghazaly and Farag retained their positions from the 2006 African Championships.					
Hammer	Chris Harmse; South Africa	76.73	Mohsen El Anany; Egypt	72.00	Saber Souid; Tunisia	70.01
Hammer	July 21: Harmse became the fifth athlete to win three All-Africa Games titles in a row. El Anany and Souid switched places compared to the 2006 African Championships.					
Javelin	John Robert Oosthuizen; South Africa	78.05	Gerhardus Pienaar; South Africa	76.70	Mohamed Ali Kebabou; Tunisia	71.77
Javelin	July 22					
Decathlon	Hamdi Dhouibi; Tunisia	7838 points GR	Boualem Lamri; Algeria	7473 points	Larbi Bouraada; Algeria	7349 points
Decathlon	July 18–19: Dhouibi continued his dominance in African decathlon, this time beating the old Games record from 1999 of 7497 points.					
WR world record | AR area record | CR championship record | GR games record | NR national record | OR Olympic record | PB personal best | SB season best | WL world leading (in a given season)

== Women's results ==
=== Track ===
Event	Gold		Silver		Bronze	
100 m	Damola Osayemi; Nigeria	11.20	Constance Mkenku; South Africa	11.27	Vida Anim; Ghana	11.33
100 m	July 19: Mkenku won the first All-Africa Games (Women's) 100 metres medal for a country other than Nigeria, Ghana and Cameroon.					
200 m	Damola Osayemi; Nigeria	23.21	Vida Anim; Ghana	23.29	Amandine Allou Affoue; Ivory Coast	23.44
200 m	July 22: Osayemi won her second gold medal at the Games. Anim added a silver medal to her bronze and gold medals won in the 100 m and 4x100 m relay respectively.					
400 m	Amantle Montsho; Botswana	51.13	Joy Eze; Nigeria	51.20	Folashade Abugan; Nigeria	51.44
400 m	July 20: Montsho won Botswana's first gold medal at the Games.					
800 m	Leonor Piuza; Mozambique	2:02.83	Agnes Samaria; Namibia	203.17	Nahida Touhami; Algeria	2:03.79
800 m	July 19: Piuza continued the Mozambican dominance of the event, following Maria Mutola's wins in 1991, 1995 and 1999.					
1500 m	Gelete Burika; Ethiopia	4:06.89	Veronica Nyaruai; Kenya	4:09.11	Agnes Samaria; Namibia	4:09.18
1500 m	July 22: Samaria won her second medal at the Games.					
5000 m	Meseret Defar; Ethiopia	15:02.72	Meselech Melkamu; Ethiopia	15:03.86	Sylvia Chibiwott Kibet; Kenya	15:06.39
5000 m	July 18: Defar and Kibet defended their medals from the 2006 African Championships.					
10,000 m	Mestawet Tufa; Ethiopia	31:26.05	Edith Masai; Kenya	31:31.18	Irene Kipchumba; Kenya	31:36.78
10,000 m	July 21: World leader Tufa beat 40-year-old Masai.					
Half marathon	Souad Ait Salem; Algeria	1:13:35	Atsede Baysa; Ethiopia	1:13:54	Kenza Dahmani; Algeria	1:14:10
Half marathon	July 20: The first athletics gold medal for the host country.					
100 m h	Toyin Augustus; Nigeria	13.23	Jessica Ohanaja; Nigeria	13.27	Fatmata Fofanah; Guinea	13.76
100 m h	July 20: Augustus defended her title from the 2006 African Championships. Fofanah won the first All-Africa Games athletics medal for Guinea.					
400 m h	Muna Jabir Adam; Sudan	54.93 NR	Aissata Soulama; Burkina Faso	55.49 NR	Ajoke Odumosu; Nigeria	55.80
400 m h	July 22					
3000 m s'chase	Ruth Bosibori; Kenya	9:31.99	Mekdes Bekele Tadese; Ethiopia	9:49.95	Netsanet Achamo; Ethiopia	9:51.63
3000 m s'chase	July 20: The event was staged for the first time.					
20 km walk	Chaima Trabelsi; Tunisia	1:49:13	Mercy Njoki; Kenya	1:49:18	Arasa Asnaksh Abissa; Ethiopia	1:49:29
20 km walk	July 19					
4 x 100 m	Ghana; Mariama Salifu, Esther Dankwah, Gifty Addy, Vida Anim	43.84	Nigeria; Gladys Nwabani, Endurance Ojokolo, Damola Osayemi, Emem Edem	43.85	Ivory Coast; Judith Djaman Brah, Louise Ayetotche, Cynthia Niako, Amandine Allou Affoue	44.48
4 x 100 m	July 20: Ghana and Nigeria defended their positions from the 2006 African Championships.					
4 x 400 m	Nigeria; Joy Eze, Folashade Abugan, Sekinat Adesanya, Christy Ekpukhon	3:29.74	South Africa; Estie Wittstock, Amanda Kotze, Tihanna Vorster, Tsholofelo Selemela	3:33.62	Sudan; Nawal El Jack, Faiza Omar, Mohamed Hind, Muna Jabir Adam	3:39.79
4 x 400 m	July 22: Nigeria and South Africa switched places compared to the 2006 African Championships, while Sudan won their first relay medal.					
WR world record | AR area record | CR championship record | GR games record | NR national record | OR Olympic record | PB personal best | SB season best | WL world leading (in a given season)

=== Field ===
Event	Gold		Silver		Bronze	
High jump	Doreen Amata; Nigeria	1.89	Anika Smit; South Africa	1.89	Marcoleen Pretorius; South Africa	1.83
High jump	July 19: Amata established a new national record to upset Smit and claim Nigeria's first gold medal at the Games.					
Pole vault	Leila Ben Youssef; Tunisia	3.85	Ahmed Eman Nesrim; Egypt	3.60	Eva Thornton; South Africa	3.30
Pole vault	July 19: Five athletes entered the competition. First-time competitor Leila Ben Youssef of Tunisia claimed the gold.					
Long jump	Janice Josephs; South Africa	6.79 (+0.1)	Blessing Okagbare; Nigeria	6.46 (+1.8)	Yah Koïta; Mali	6.35w (+2.2)
Long jump	July 21					
Triple jump	Yamilé Aldama; Sudan	14.46 (+0.5)	Chinonye Ohadugha; Nigeria	14.21 (-0.1); NR	Otonye Iworima; Nigeria	13.83 (+0.9)
Triple jump	July 18: Aldama and Iworima defended their medals from the 2006 African Championships, while Ohadugha set a new Nigerian record.					
Shot put	Vivian Chukwuemeka; Nigeria	17.60	Simoné du Toit; South Africa	16.77	Veronica Abrahamse; South Africa	15.75
Shot put	July 22: Chukwuemeka became the sixth athlete to win three All-Africa Games titles in a row. Abrahamse had won two silver medals in a row, but was beaten by her young countryfellow.					
Discus	Elizna Naude; South Africa	58.40	Monia Kari; Tunisia	55.15	Vivian Chukwuemeka; Nigeria	52.52
Discus	July 21					
Hammer	Marwa Ahmed Hussein Arafat; Egypt	65.70	Funke Adeoye; Nigeria	64.04	Florence Ezeh; Togo	59.55
Hammer	July 19: Arafat retained her title from the 2006 African Championships. Five athletes entered the competition.					
Javelin	Justine Robbeson; South Africa	58.09	Lindy Leveau; Seychelles	56.49	Sunette Viljoen; South Africa	54.46
Javelin	July 20: The three athletes also shared the podium at the 2006 African Championships, with Robbeson defending the gold medal.					
Heptathlon	Margaret Simpson; Ghana	6278 points GR	Patience Okoro; Nigeria	5161 points	Beatrice Kamboule; Burkina Faso	4994 points NR
Heptathlon	July 20–21: Simpson improved her own Games record.					
WR world record | AR area record | CR championship record | GR games record | NR national record | OR Olympic record | PB personal best | SB season best | WL world leading (in a given season)

== Medal table ==
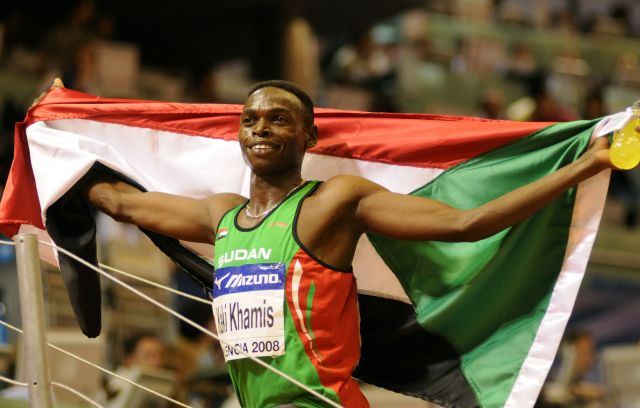
Eighteen-year-old Abubaker Kaki scored a gold for Sudan.

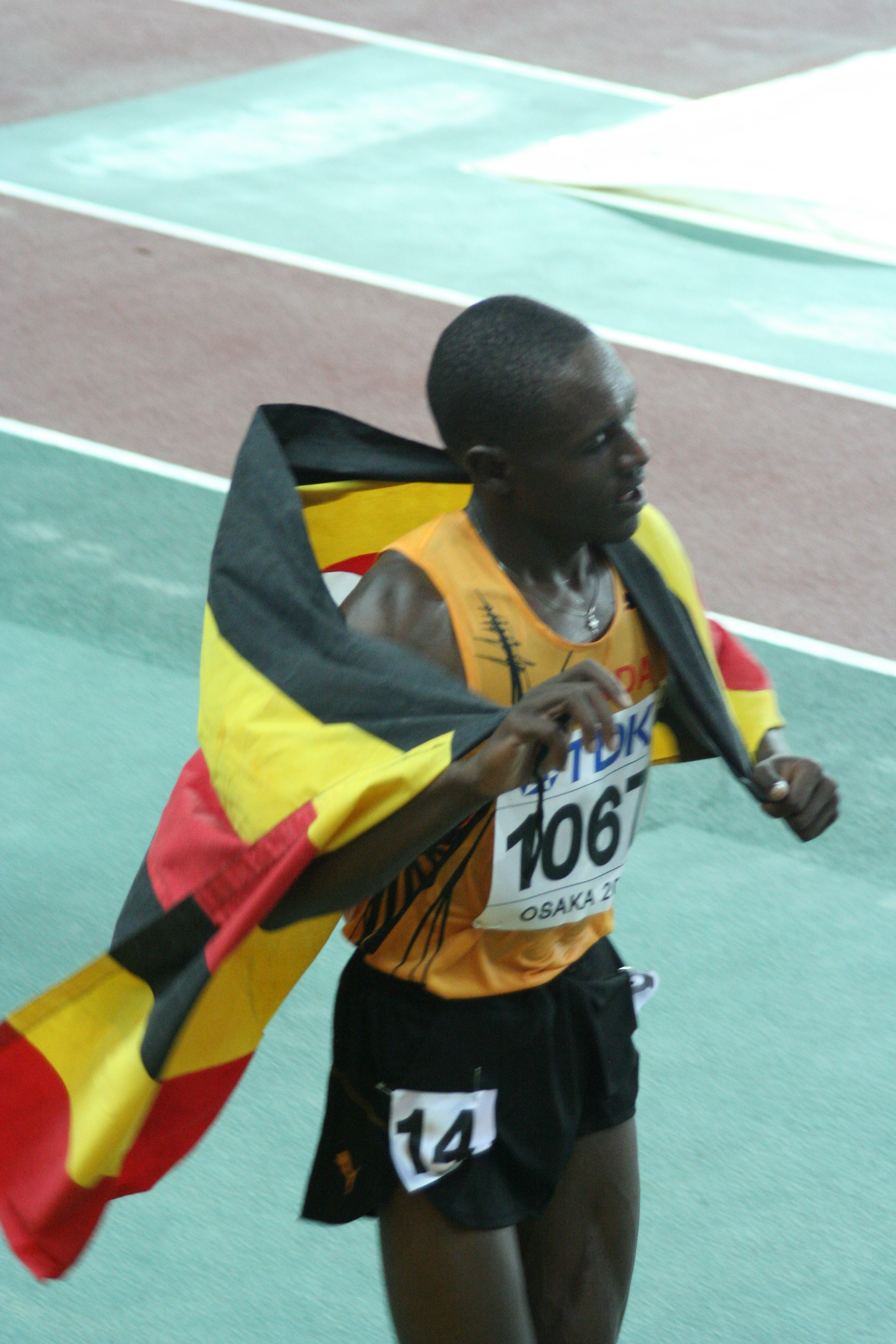
Moses Kipsiro took the 5000 m gold, Uganda's only medal of the tournament.

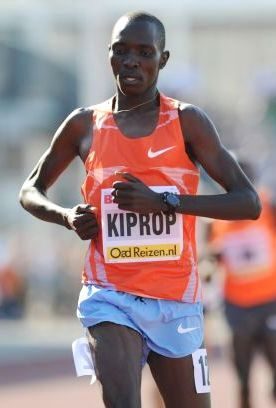
Asbel Kiprop was one of three Kenyan gold medallists.

* Host nation (Algeria)

Rank	Nation	Gold	Silver	Bronze	Total
1	Nigeria	9	8	7	24
2	South Africa	7	9	8	24
3	Tunisia	5	1	4	10
4	Botswana	5	0	0	5
5	Ethiopia	4	4	5	13
6	Kenya	3	6	3	12
7	Egypt	3	3	0	6
8	Sudan	3	0	1	4
9	Ghana	2	3	2	7
10	Algeria*	1	3	6	10
11	Senegal	1	1	0	2
12	Eritrea	1	0	1	2
13	Mozambique	1	0	0	1
13	Uganda	1	0	0	1
15	Zimbabwe	0	1	2	3
16	Burkina Faso	0	1	1	2
16	Namibia	0	1	1	2
18	Cameroon	0	1	0	1
18	Madagascar	0	1	0	1
18	Mauritius	0	1	0	1
18	Seychelles	0	1	0	1
18	Tanzania	0	1	0	1
23	Ivory Coast	0	0	2	2
24	Benin	0	0	1	1
24	Guinea	0	0	1	1
24	Mali	0	0	1	1
24	Togo	0	0	1	1
Totals (27 entries)		46	46	47	139

== Participating nations ==
- Algeria (55)
- Angola (5)
- Benin (6)
- Botswana (16)
- Burkina Faso (12)
- Burundi (8)
- Cameroon (13)
- Central African Republic (7)
- Chad (9)
- Comoros (1)
- Ivory Coast (10)
- Democratic Republic of the Congo (9)
- Djibouti (2)
- Egypt (13)
- Equatorial Guinea (4)
- Eritrea (23)
- Ethiopia (35)
- Gabon (5)
- Gambia (9)
- Ghana (16)
- Guinea (8)
- Guinea-Bissau (4)
- Kenya (48)
- Lesotho (6)
- Liberia (10)
- Libya (7)
- Madagascar (5)
- Malawi (2)
- Mali (10)
- Mauritania (3)
- Mauritius (11)
- Mozambique (6)
- Namibia (8)
- Niger (2)
- Nigeria (57)
- Republic of the Congo (2)
- Rwanda (13)
- São Tomé and Príncipe (1)
- Senegal (21)
- Seychelles (1)
- Sierra Leone (1)
- South Africa (76)
- Sudan (15)
- Swaziland (1)
- Tanzania (5)
- Togo (3)
- Tunisia (14)
- Uganda (9)
- Zambia (5)
- Zimbabwe (16)
