= Bambous =

- Village
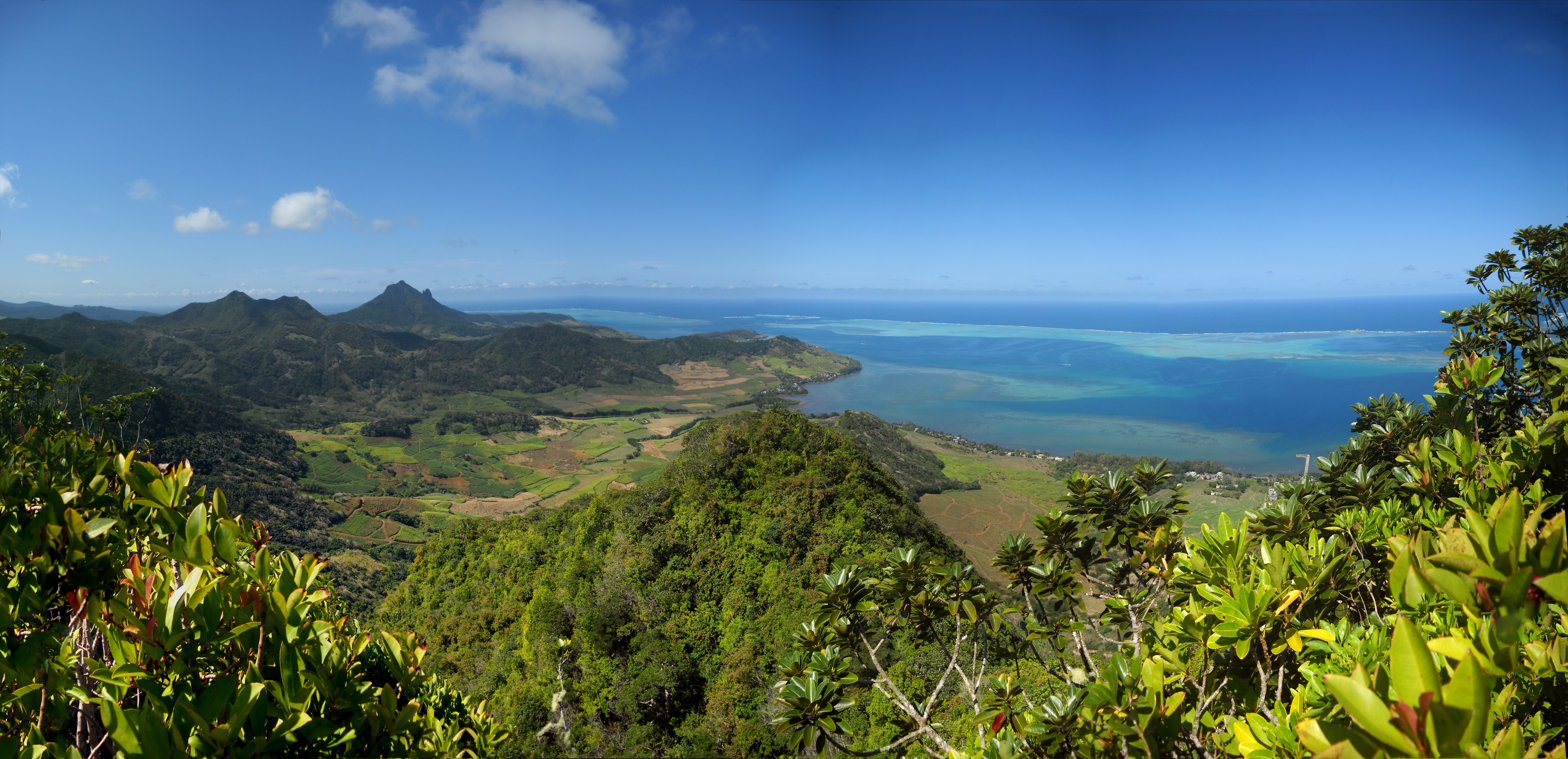
- Bambous Mountains

- Location within Mauritius
- Coordinates: 20°15′36″S 57°24′53.4″E
- Country: Mauritius
- Districts: Rivière Noire District

Government

Population (2011)
  - Total: 15,345
  - Density: 702.9/km^{2} (1,821/sq mi)
- Time zone: UTC+4 (MUT)
- Area code: 230
- ISO 3166 code: MU

Bambous is a small town in Mauritius located in the Rivière Noire District. The village is administered by the Bambous Village Council under the aegis of the Rivière Noire District Council. According to the 2011 census conducted by Statistics Mauritius, the population was 15,345.

== Sports ==
The local football team is the Bambous Etoile de L'ouest S.C. The village hosts a multi-purpose sports venue, the Stade Germain Comarmond, the venue has hosted various international competitions, such as the 2006 African Championships in Athletics and 2009 African Junior Athletics Championships.

== See also ==
- Districts of Mauritius
- List of places in Mauritius
