= List of African Games medalists in athletics (women) =

This is the complete list of African Games medalists in women's athletics from 1965 to 2015.

== Current Program ==
=== 100 metres ===
Games	Gold		Silver		Bronze	
1965 Brazzaville	Jumoke Bodunrin; Nigeria	12.4	Regina Okafor; Nigeria	12.5	Rose Hart; Ghana	12.5
1973 Lagos	Alice Annum; Ghana	11.77	Rose Asiedua; Ghana	11.93	Utifon Ufon Oko; Nigeria	12.06
1978 Algiers	Hannah Afriyie; Ghana	11.50	Utifon Ufon Oko; Nigeria	11.55	Kemi Sandgodeyi; Nigeria	11.92
1987 Nairobi	Tina Iheagwam; Nigeria	11.32A	Falilat Ogunkoya; Nigeria	11.43A	Mary Onyali; Nigeria	11.47A
1991 Cairo	Mary Onyali; Nigeria	11.12	Beatrice Utondu; Nigeria	11.13	Rufina Ubah; Nigeria	11.43
1995 Harare	Mary Onyali; Nigeria	11.18A	Christy Opara-Thompson; Nigeria	11.35A	Mary Tombiri; Nigeria	11.40A
1999 Johannesburg	Mercy Nku; Nigeria	11.03A	Myriam Léonie Mani; Cameroon	11.24A	Endurance Ojokolo; Nigeria	11.25A
2003 Abuja	Mary Onyali; Nigeria	11.26	Endurance Ojokolo; Nigeria	11.26	Vida Anim; Ghana	11.29
2007 Algiers	Oludamola Osayomi; Nigeria	11.20	Constance Mkenku; South Africa	11.27	Vida Anim; Ghana	11.33
2011 Maputo	Oludamola Osayomi; Nigeria	10.90	Blessing Okagbare; Nigeria	11.01	Gloria Asumnu; Nigeria	11.26
2015 Brazzaville	Marie-Josée Ta Lou; Ivory Coast	11.02	Eunice Kadogo; Kenya	11.47	Pon-Karidjatou Traoré; Burkina Faso	11.49
2019 Rabat	Marie-Josée Ta Lou; Ivory Coast	11.09	Gina Bass; Gambia	11.13	Bassant Hemida; Egypt	11.31

=== 200 metres ===
Games	Gold		Silver		Bronze	
1973 Lagos	Alice Annum; Ghana	23.88	Beatrice Ewuzie; Nigeria	24.78	Josephine Ocran; Ghana	24.82
1978 Algiers	Hannah Afriyie; Ghana	23.01	Kehinde Vaughan; Nigeria	23.70	Ruth Waithera; Kenya	23.91
1987 Nairobi	Mary Onyali; Nigeria	22.66A	Falilat Ogunkoya; Nigeria	22.95A	Tina Iheagwam; Nigeria	23.56A
1991 Cairo	Tina Iheagwam; Nigeria	22.82	Fatima Yusuf; Nigeria	22.84	Christy Opara-Thompson; Nigeria	23.68
1995 Harare	Mary Onyali; Nigeria	22.75A	Calister Uba; Nigeria	23.42A	Kate Iheagwam; Nigeria	23.77A
1999 Johannesburg	Fatima Yusuf; Nigeria	22.45A	Myriam Léonie Mani; Cameroon	22.91A	Monica Twum; Ghana	22.98A
2003 Abuja	Mary Onyali; Nigeria	23.09	Vida Anim; Ghana	23.17	Estie Wittstock; South Africa	23.46
2007 Algiers	Oludamola Osayomi; Nigeria	23.21	Vida Anim; Ghana	23.29	Amandine Allou Affoue; Ivory Coast	23.44
2011 Maputo	Oludamola Osayomi; Nigeria	22.86	Vida Anim; Ghana	23.06	Tjipekapora Herunga; Namibia	23.50
2015 Brazzaville	Marie-Josée Ta Lou; Ivory Coast	22.57	Ngozi Onwumere; Nigeria	23.24	Lawretta Ozoh; Nigeria	23.37
2019 Rabat	Gina Bass; Gambia	22.58	Bassant Hemida; Egypt	22.89	Marie-Josée Ta Lou; Ivory Coast	23.00

=== 400 metres ===
Games	Gold		Silver		Bronze	
1973 Lagos	Tekla Chemabwai; Kenya	54.06	Grace Bakari; Ghana	55.63	Florence Mgbakwe; Nigeria	56.08
1978 Algiers	Kehinde Vaughan; Nigeria	53.86	Ruth Kyalisima; Uganda	54.49	Georgina Aidou; Ghana	54.84
1987 Nairobi	Francisca Chepkurui; Kenya	51.99A	Geraldine Shitandayi; Kenya	52.07A	Mercy Addy; Ghana	52.35A
1991 Cairo	Fatima Yusuf; Nigeria	50.71	Charity Opara; Nigeria	51.23	Airat Bakare; Nigeria	52.98
1995 Harare	Fatima Yusuf; Nigeria	49.43A	Falilat Ogunkoya; Nigeria	50.31A	Olabisi Afolabi; Nigeria	51.53A
1999 Johannesburg	Falilat Ogunkoya; Nigeria	50.02A	Olabisi Afolabi; Nigeria	50.34A	Amy Mbacké Thiam; Senegal	50.95A
2003 Abuja	Fatou Bintou Fall; Senegal	51.38	Doris Jacob; Nigeria	51.41	Mireille Nguimgo; Cameroon	51.59
2007 Algiers	Amantle Montsho; Botswana	51.13	Joy Eze; Nigeria	51.20	Folashade Abugan; Nigeria	51.44
2011 Maputo	Amantle Montsho; Botswana	50.87	Amy Mbacké Thiam; Senegal	51.77	Tjipekapora Herunga; Namibia	51.84
2015 Brazzaville	Kabange Mupopo; Zambia	50.22	Patience Okon George; Nigeria	50.71	Tjipekapora Herunga; Namibia	51.55
2019 Rabat	Galefele Moroko; Botswana	22.58	Favour Ofili; Nigeria	22.89	Grace Obour; Ghana	23.00

=== 800 metres ===
Games	Gold		Silver		Bronze	
1973 Lagos	Christine Anyakun; Uganda	2:09.53	Rosalind Joshua; Nigeria	2:10.74	Helena Opoku; Ghana	2:11.71
1978 Algiers	Tekla Chemabwai; Kenya	2:04.84	Sakina Boutamine; Algeria	2:05.64	Célestine N'Drin; Ivory Coast	2:06.08
1987 Nairobi	Selina Chirchir; Kenya	2:03.22A	Florence Wanjiru; Kenya	2:03.77A	Mary Chemweno; Kenya	2:04.34A
1991 Cairo	Maria Mutola; Mozambique	2:04.02	Zewde Hailemariam; Ethiopia	2:04.99	Gladys Wamuyu; Kenya	2:07.14
1995 Harare	Maria Mutola; Mozambique	1:56.99A	Tina Paulino; Mozambique	2:01.07A	Kutre Dulecha; Ethiopia	2:02.26A
1999 Johannesburg	Maria Mutola; Mozambique	1:59.73A	Nouria Mérah-Benida; Algeria	2:00.83A	Grace Birungi; Uganda	2:01.76A
2003 Abuja	Grace Ebor; Nigeria	2:02.04	Akosua Serwaa; Ghana	2:02.40	Lwiza John; Tanzania	2:02.85
2007 Algiers	Leonor Piuza; Mozambique	2:02.83	Agnes Samaria; Namibia	2:03.17	Nahida Touhami; Algeria	2:03.79
2011 Maputo	Annet Negesa; Uganda	2:01.81	Fantu Magiso; Ethiopia	2:03.22	Sylvia Chesebe; Kenya	2:04.16
2015 Brazzaville	Caster Semenya; South Africa	2:00.97	Annet Mwanzi; Kenya	2:01.54	Chaltu Shume; Ethiopia	2:01.59
2019 Rabat	Hirut Meshesha; Ethiopia	2:03.16	Rababe Arafi; Morocco	2:03.40	Halimah Nakaayi; Uganda	2:03.55

=== 1500 metres ===
Games	Gold		Silver		Bronze	
1973 Lagos	Peace Kesiime; Uganda	4:38.70	Mary Wagaki; Kenya	4:38.79	Ruth Yeboah; Ghana	4:42.32
1978 Algiers	Sakina Boutamine; Algeria	4:16.43	Anna Kiprop; Kenya	4:19.59	Rose Thomson; Kenya	4:20.07
1987 Nairobi	Selina Chirchir; Kenya	4:13.91A	Susan Sirma; Kenya	4:14.12A	Evelyn Adiru; Uganda	4:17.87A
1991 Cairo	Susan Sirma; Kenya	4:10.68	Margaret Kigari; Kenya	4:12.34	Getenesh Urge; Ethiopia	4:12.38
1995 Harare	Kutre Dulecha; Ethiopia	4:18.32A	Julia Sakara; Zimbabwe	4:21.10A	Genet Gebregiorgis; Ethiopia	4:21.94A
1999 Johannesburg	Kutre Dulecha; Ethiopia	4:18.33A	Nouria Mérah-Benida; Algeria	4:18.69A	Jackline Maranga; Kenya	4:19.31A
2003 Abuja	Kutre Dulecha; Ethiopia	4:21.63	Jackline Maranga; Kenya	4:22.69	Naomi Mugo; Kenya	4:24.33
2007 Algiers	Gelete Burka; Ethiopia	4:06.89	Veronica Nyaruai; Kenya	4:09.11	Agnes Samaria; Namibia	4:09.18
2011 Maputo	Irene Jelagat; Kenya	4:13.67	Joyce Chepkirui; Kenya	4:13.71	Tezita Bogale; Ethiopia	4:14.41
2015 Brazzaville	Dawit Seyaum; Ethiopia	4:16.69	Besu Sado; Ethiopia	4:18.86	Beatrice Chepkoech; Kenya	4:19.16
2019 Rabat	Quailyne Jebiwott Kiprop; Kenya	4:19.33	Rababe Arafi; Kenya	4:20.19	Halimah Nakaayi; Ethiopia	4:20.60

=== 3000 metres steeplechase ===
Games	Gold		Silver		Bronze	
2007 Algiers	Ruth Bosibori; Kenya	9:31.99	Mekdes Bekele; Ethiopia	9:49.95	Netsanet Achamo; Ethiopia	9:51.63
2011 Maputo	Hyvin Jepkemoi; Kenya	10:00.50	Hiwot Ayalew; Ethiopia	10:00.57	Birtukan Adamu; Ethiopia	10:02.22
2015 Brazzaville	Sofia Assefa; Ethiopia	9:51.30	Hiwot Ayalew; Ethiopia	9:51.94	Purity Cherotich Kirui; Kenya	9:52.54
2019 Rabat	Mekides Abebe; Ethiopia	9:35.18	Mercy Gitahi; Kenya	9:37.35	Weynshet Ansa; Ethiopia	9:38.56

=== 5000 metres ===
Games	Gold		Silver		Bronze	
1995 Harare	Rose Cheruiyot; Kenya	15:37.9A	Ayelech Worku; Ethiopia	15:48.3A	Lydia Cheromei; Kenya	15:52.6A
1999 Johannesburg	Ayelech Worku; Ethiopia	15:38.22A	Elana Meyer; South Africa	15:42.76A	Vivian Cheruiyot; Kenya	15:42.79A
2003 Abuja	Meseret Defar; Ethiopia	16:42.0	Dorcus Inzikuru; Uganda	16:42.9	Isabella Ochichi; Kenya	16:43.4
2007 Algiers	Meseret Defar; Ethiopia	15:02.72	Meselech Melkamu; Ethiopia	15:03.86	Sylvia Kibet; Kenya	15:06.39
2011 Maputo	Sule Utura; Ethiopia	15:38.70	Emebet Anteneh Mengistu; Ethiopia	15:40.13	Pauline Korikwiang; Kenya	15:40.93
2015 Brazzaville	Margaret Chelimo; Kenya	15:30.15	Rosemary Wanjiru; Kenya	15:30.18	Alice Aprot; Kenya	15:31.82
2019 Rabat	Lilian Kasait Rengeruk; Kenya	15:33.63	Hawi Feysa; Ethiopia	15:33.99	Alemitu Tariku; Ethiopia	15:37.15

=== 10,000 metres ===
Games	Gold		Silver		Bronze	
1987 Nairobi	Leah Malot; Kenya	33:58.15A	Marcianne Mukamurenzi; Rwanda	33:58.55A	Mary Kirui; Kenya	34:12.21A
1991 Cairo	Derartu Tulu; Ethiopia	33:40.37	Lydia Cheromei; Kenya	33:53.00	Tigist Moreda; Ethiopia	33:59.76
1995 Harare	Sally Barsosio; Kenya	32:22.26A	Delilah Asiago; Kenya	32:56.12A	Gete Wami; Ethiopia	33:17.96A
1999 Johannesburg	Gete Wami; Ethiopia	32:08.15A	Merima Hashim; Ethiopia	32:16.24A	Leah Malot; Kenya	32:36.02A
2003 Abuja	Ejegayehu Dibaba; Ethiopia	32:34.54	Werknesh Kidane; Ethiopia	32:37.35	Leah Malot; Kenya	32:56.43
2007 Algiers	Mestawet Tufa; Ethiopia	31:26.05	Edith Masai; Kenya	31:31.18	Irene Kwambai; Kenya	31:36.78
2011 Maputo	Sule Utura; Ethiopia	33:24.82	Wude Ayalew; Ethiopia	33:24.88	Pauline Korikwiang; Kenya	33:26.17
2015 Brazzaville	Alice Aprot; Kenya	31:24.18	Gladys Kiptagelai; Kenya	31:36.87	Gelete Burka; Ethiopia	31:38.33
2019 Rabat	Tsehay Gemechu; Ethiopia	31:56.92	Zeineba Yimer; Ethiopia	31:57.95	Dera Dida; Ethiopia	31:58.78

=== Half marathon ===
Games	Gold		Silver		Bronze	
2007 Algiers	Souad Aït Salem; Algeria	1:13:35	Atsede Baysa; Ethiopia	1:13:54	Kenza Dahmani; Algeria	1:14:40
2011 Maputo	Mare Dibaba; Ethiopia	1:10:47	Mamitu Daska; Ethiopia	1:10:52	Helalia Johannes; Namibia	1:11:12
2015 Brazzaville	Mamitu Daska; Ethiopia	1:12:42	Worknesh Degefa; Ethiopia	1:12:42	Yebrgual Melese; Ethiopia	1:12:42
2019 Rabat	Yalemzerf Yehualaw; Ethiopia	1:10.26	Degitu Azimeraw; Ethiopia	1:10.31	Meseret Belete; Ethiopia	1:12.08

=== 100 metres hurdles ===
Games	Gold		Silver		Bronze	
1973 Lagos	Modupe Oshikoya; Nigeria	14.28	Emilia Edet; Nigeria	14.48	Budesia Nyakecho; Uganda	15.29
1978 Algiers	Judy Bell-Gam; Nigeria	13.67	Ruth Kyalisima; Uganda	13.92	Bella Bell-Gam; Nigeria	13.99
1987 Nairobi	Maria Usifo; Nigeria	13.29A	Diana Yankey; Ghana	13.73A	Nacèra Zaaboub; Algeria	13.80A
1991 Cairo	Ime Akpan; Nigeria	13.44	Taiwo Aladefa; Nigeria	13.51	Nicole Ramalalanirina; Madagascar	13.70
1995 Harare	Taiwo Aladefa; Nigeria	12.98A	Angela Atede; Nigeria	13.01A	Ime Akpan; Nigeria	13.09A
1999 Johannesburg	Glory Alozie; Nigeria	12.74A	Angela Atede; Nigeria	12.99A	Mame Tacko Diouf; Senegal	13.02A
2003 Abuja	Angela Atede; Nigeria	13.01	Damaris Agbugba; Nigeria	13.06	Christy Akinremi; Nigeria	13.55
2007 Algiers	Olutoyin Augustus; Nigeria	13.23	Jessica Ohanaja; Nigeria	13.27	Fatmata Fofanah; Guinea	13.76
2011 Maputo	Seun Adigun; Nigeria	13.20	Jessica Ohanaja; Nigeria	13.36	Rosa Rakotozafy; Madagascar	13.55
2015 Brazzaville	Oluwatobiloba Amusan; Nigeria	13.15	Gnima Faye; Senegal	13.28	Lindsay Lindley; Nigeria	13.30
2019 Rabat	Tobi Amusan; Nigeria	12.68	Marthe Koala; Burkina Faso	13.20	Taylon Bieldt; South Africa	13.40

=== 400 metres hurdles ===
Games	Gold		Silver		Bronze	
1987 Nairobi	Maria Usifo; Nigeria	55.72A	Rose Tata-Muya; Kenya	55.94A	Zewde Hailemariam; Ethiopia	57.60A
1991 Cairo	Marie Womplou; Ivory Coast	57.35	Omolade Akinremi; Nigeria	58.16	Omotayo Akinremi; Nigeria	58.85
1995 Harare	Omolade Akinremi; Nigeria	56.1A	Karen van der Veen; South Africa	57.0A	Lana Uys; South Africa	57.6A
1999 Johannesburg	Mame Tacko Diouf; Senegal	55.69A	Surita Febbraio; South Africa	57.11A	Saidat Onanuga; Nigeria	58.34A
2003 Abuja	Omolade Akinremi; Nigeria	56.98	Kate Obilor; Nigeria	57.53	Carole Kaboud Mebam; Cameroon	58.28
2007 Algiers	Muna Jabir Adam; Sudan	54.93	Aïssata Soulama; Burkina Faso	55.49	Ajoke Odumosu; Nigeria	55.80
2011 Maputo	Ajoke Odumosu; Nigeria	56.26	Wenda Theron; South Africa	57.13	Kou Luogon; Liberia	57.34
2015 Brazzaville	Amaka Ogoegbunam; Nigeria	55.86	Ajoke Odumosu; Nigeria	57.63	Lilianne Klaasman; Namibia	58.68
2019 Rabat	Vanice Nyagisera; Kenya	56.95	Lamiae Lhabze; Morocco	56.97	Uwemedino Abasiono Akpan; Nigeria	57.66

=== High jump ===
Games	Gold		Silver		Bronze	
1965 Brazzaville	Amelia Okoli; Nigeria	1.62	Habibah Atta; Ghana	1.59	Regina Awori; Uganda	1.56
1973 Lagos	Modupe Oshikoya; Nigeria	1.71	Agnes Aghagba; Nigeria	1.69	Magdalena Chesire; Kenya	1.60
1978 Algiers	Modupe Oshikoya; Nigeria	1.77	Kawther Akrémi; Tunisia	1.73	Emilia Blavo; Ghana	1.68
1987 Nairobi	Awa Dioum-Ndiaye; Senegal	1.80A	Nacèra Zaaboub; Algeria	1.78A	Constance Senghor; Senegal	1.73A
1991 Cairo	Lucienne N'Da; Ivory Coast	1.83	Ifeanyi Aduba; Nigeria	1.73	Stella Agbaegbu; Nigeria	1.70
1995 Harare	Hestrie Storbeck; South Africa	1.85A	Irène Tiendrébéogo; Burkina Faso	1.75A	Madeleine Joubert; Namibia	1.70A
1999 Johannesburg	Hestrie Cloete (Storbeck); South Africa	1.96A	Irène Tiendrébéogo; Burkina Faso	1.85A	Philippa Erasmus; South Africa	1.80A
2003 Abuja	Nkeka Ukuh; Nigeria	1.84	Marizca Gertenbach; South Africa	1.84	Anika Smit; South Africa	1.80
2007 Algiers	Doreen Amata; Nigeria	1.89	Anika Smit; South Africa	1.89	Marcoleen Pretorius; South Africa	1.83
2011 Maputo	Doreen Amata; Nigeria	1.80	Uhunoma Osazuwa; Nigeria	1.80	Lissa Labiche; Seychelles	1.80
2015 Brazzaville	Lissa Labiche; Seychelles	1.91	Doreen Amata; Nigeria	1.85	Julia du Plessis; South Africa	1.80
2019 Rabat	Rose Yeboah; Ghana	1.84	Rhizlane Siba; Morocco	1.81	Ariyat Dibow Ubang; Ethiopia	1.81

=== Pole vault ===
Games	Gold		Silver		Bronze	
1999 Johannesburg	Rika Erasmus; South Africa	3.60A	Elmarie Gerryts; South Africa	3.60A	not awarded	
2003 Abuja	Samantha Dodd; South Africa	3.90	Annelie van Wyk; South Africa	3.80	Margaretha du Plessis; South Africa	3.50
2007 Algiers	Leila Ben Youssef; Tunisia	3.85	Ahmed Eman Nesrim; Egypt	3.60	Eva Thornton; South Africa	3.30
2011 Maputo	Dorra Mahfoudhi; Tunisia	3.60	Alima Ouattara; Ivory Coast	3.20	not awarded	
2015 Brazzaville	Syrine Balti; Tunisia	4.10	Dorra Mahfoudhi; Tunisia	4.10	Sinaly Ouattara; Ivory Coast	3.40
2019 Rabat	Dora Mahfoudhi; Tunisia	4.31	Fatma Elbendary; Egypt	4.10	Dina Eltabaa; Egypt	4.00

=== Long jump ===
Games	Gold		Silver		Bronze	
1965 Brazzaville	Alice Annum; Ghana	5.63	Angelina Osuagwu; Nigeria	5.34	Teddy Nakisuyi; Uganda	5.22
1973 Lagos	Modupe Oshikoya; Nigeria	6.16	Margaret Odafin; Nigeria	6.07	Christine Kabanda; Uganda	5.73
1978 Algiers	Modupe Oshikoya; Nigeria	6.32	Janet Yawson; Ghana	6.29	Bella Bell-Gam; Nigeria	6.12
1987 Nairobi	Beatrice Utondu; Nigeria	6.45A	Comfort Igeh; Nigeria	6.19A	Albertine Koutouan; Ivory Coast	6.05A
1991 Cairo	Chioma Ajunwa; Nigeria	6.67	Beatrice Utondu; Nigeria	6.50	Christy Opara-Thompson; Nigeria	6.33
1995 Harare	Eunice Barber; Sierra Leone	6.70Aw	Sanet Fouché; South Africa	6.45A	Patience Itanyi; Nigeria	6.39A
1999 Johannesburg	Grace Umelo; Nigeria	6.60A	Françoise Mbango Etone; Cameroon	6.55A	Charlene Lawrence; South Africa	6.50A
2003 Abuja	Esther Aghatise; Nigeria	6.58	Grace Umelo; Nigeria	6.56	Chinedu Odozor; Nigeria	6.52
2007 Algiers	Janice Josephs; South Africa	6.79	Blessing Okagbare; Nigeria	6.46	Yah Koïta; Mali	6.35w
2011 Maputo	Blessing Okagbare; Nigeria	6.50w	Sarah Ngo Ngoa; Cameroon	6.46w	Romaissa Belabioud; Algeria	6.46
2015 Brazzaville	Joëlle Mbumi Nkouindjin; Cameroon	6.31	Romaissa Tahani Belabiod; Algeria	6.30	Lissa Labiche; Seychelles	6.25
2019 Rabat	Ese Brume; Nigeria	6.69	Deborah Acquah; Ghana	6.37	Lynique Beneke; South Africa	6.30

=== Triple jump ===
Games	Gold		Silver		Bronze	
1995 Harare	Rosa Collins-Okah; Nigeria	13.80A	Abiola Williams; Nigeria	13.12A	Eunice Basweti; Kenya	12.86A
1999 Johannesburg	Françoise Mbango Etone; Cameroon	14.70A	Baya Rahouli; Algeria	14.64A	Kéné Ndoye; Senegal	13.86A
2003 Abuja	Kéné Ndoye; Senegal	14.23	Salamatu Alimi; Nigeria	13.47	Nkechinyere Mbaoma; Nigeria	13.18
2007 Algiers	Yamilé Aldama; Sudan	14.46	Chinonye Ohadugha; Nigeria	14.21	Otonye Iworima; Nigeria	13.83
2011 Maputo	Baya Rahouli; Algeria	14.08m	Kéné Ndoye; Senegal	13.69m	Otonye Iworima; Nigeria	13.53m
2015 Brazzaville	Joëlle Mbumi Nkouindjin; Cameroon	13.75	Ibrahim Blessing Ibukun; Nigeria	13.52	Nadia Eke; Ghana	13.40
2019 Rabat	Grace Anigbata; Nigeria	13.75	Jamaa Chnaik; Morocco	13.69	Zinzi Chabangu; South Africa	13.59

=== Shot put ===
Games	Gold		Silver		Bronze	
1973 Lagos	Evelyn Okeke; Nigeria	13.59	Nnenna Njoku; Nigeria	12.39	Brigitte Goze; Ivory Coast	11.90
1978 Algiers	Joyce Aciro; Uganda	14.47	Veronica Baawah; Ghana	12.88	Herina Malit; Kenya	12.70
1987 Nairobi	Elizabeth Olaba; Kenya	15.30A	Aïcha Dahmous; Algeria	13.84A	Martha Atieno; Kenya	12.81A
1991 Cairo	Hanan Ahmed Khaled; Egypt	14.88	Elizabeth Olaba; Kenya	14.83	Mariam Nnodu; Nigeria	14.66
1995 Harare	Hanan Ahmed Khaled; Egypt	15.29A	Wafaa Ismail Baghdadi; Egypt	14.76A	Beatrix Steenberg; South Africa	14.71A
1999 Johannesburg	Vivian Peters; Nigeria	16.72A	Veronica Abrahamse; South Africa	16.53A	Maranelle du Toit; South Africa	16.45A
2003 Abuja	Vivian Chukwuemeka (Peters); Nigeria	18.12	Veronica Abrahamse; South Africa	15.77	Wafaa Ismail Baghdadi; Egypt	15.32
2007 Algiers	Vivian Chukwuemeka; Nigeria	17.60	Simoné du Toit; South Africa	16.77	Veronica Abrahamse; South Africa	15.75
2011 Maputo	Auriol Dongmo Mekemnang; Cameroon	16.03	Veronica Abrahamse; South Africa	15.70	Sonia Smuts; South Africa	15.29
2015 Brazzaville	Auriol Dongmo Mekemnang; Cameroon	17.21	Claire Uke; Nigeria	16.64	Sonia Smuts; South Africa	15.92
2019 Rabat	GSade Olatoye; Nigeria	16.61	Ischke Senekal; South Africa	16.18	Mieke Strydom; South Africa	14.64

=== Discus throw ===
Games	Gold		Silver		Bronze	
1973 Lagos	Rose Hart; Ghana	41.06	Adobi Okoli; Nigeria	40.82	Albestine de Zouza; Togo	38.20
1978 Algiers	Fathia Jerbi; Tunisia	46.56	Helen Alyek; Uganda	45.90	Martha Jugah; Nigeria	45.02
1987 Nairobi	Jeanne Ngo Minyemeck; Cameroon	46.28A	Hanan Ahmed Khaled; Egypt	45.12A	Aïcha Dahmous; Algeria	44.80A
1991 Cairo	Hanan Ahmed Khaled; Egypt	48.32	Hiba Meshili Abu Zaghari; Egypt	46.88	Wilma Brendenham; Namibia	46.42
1995 Harare	Monia Kari; Tunisia	54.26A	Rhona Dwinger; South Africa	49.84A	Caroline Fournier; Mauritius	45.12A
1999 Johannesburg	Monia Kari; Tunisia	57.22A	Lezelle Duvenage; South Africa	54.55A	Elizna Naudé; South Africa	53.26A
2003 Abuja	Elizna Naudé; South Africa	57.44	Vivian Chukwuemeka; Nigeria	54.83	Alifatou Djibril; Togo	54.79
2007 Algiers	Elizna Naudé; South Africa	58.40	Monia Kari; Tunisia	55.15	Vivian Chukwuemeka; Nigeria	52.52
2011 Maputo	Kazai Suzanne Kragbé; Ivory Coast	56.56	Elizna Naudé; South Africa	53.63	Alifatou Djibril; Togo	46.46
2015 Brazzaville	Claire Uke; Nigeria	54.25	Ischke Senekal; South Africa	50.53	Julia Agawu; Ghana	49.08
2019 Rabat	Chioma Onyekwere; Nigeria	59.91	Yolandi Stander; South Africa	57.75	Ischke Senekal; South Africa	53.95

=== Hammer throw ===
Games	Gold		Silver		Bronze	
1999 Johannesburg	Caroline Fournier; Mauritius	58.83A	Elmarie Knoetzen; South Africa	58.74A	Marwa Ahmed Hussein; Egypt	55.25A
2003 Abuja	Marwa Ahmed Hussein; Egypt	64.28	Susan Adeoye Olufunke; Nigeria	58.86	Vivian Chukwuemeka; Nigeria	56.54
2007 Algiers	Marwa Hussein; Egypt	65.70	Susan Olufunke Adeoye; Nigeria	64.04	Florence Ezeh; Togo	59.55
2011 Maputo	Amy Sène; Senegal	61.48	Sarah Bensaad; Tunisia	59.65	Rana Ahmed Ibrahim; Egypt	58.57
2015 Brazzaville	Lætitia Bambara; Burkina Faso	66.91	Amy Sène; Senegal	63.64	Jennifer Batu Bawsitika; Congo	62.13
2019 Rabat	Lætitia Bambara; Burkina Faso	65.28	Temilola Ogunrinde; Nigeria	64.68	Sade Olatoye; Nigeria	63.97

=== Javelin throw ===
Games	Gold		Silver		Bronze	
1965 Brazzaville	Helena Okwara; Nigeria	40.30	Theresia Dismas; Tanzania	40.24	Angelina Anyikwa; Nigeria	39.48
1973 Lagos	Constance Rwabiryagye; Uganda	47.50	Lilian Cherotich; Kenya	41.94	Angelina Chekpiyeng; Kenya	39.12
1978 Algiers	Eunice Nekesa; Kenya	51.58	Agnès Tchuinté; Cameroon	49.16	Constance Rwabiryagye; Uganda	45.52
1987 Nairobi	Samia Djémaa; Algeria	53.30A	Seraphina Nyauma; Kenya	51.60A	Matilda Kisava; Tanzania	47.02A
1991 Cairo	Seraphina Nyauma; Kenya	51.94	Ann Otutu; Nigeria	50.54	Matilda Kisava; Tanzania	46.58
1995 Harare	Rhona Dwinger; South Africa	55.98A	Fatma Zouhour Toumi; Tunisia	50.04A	Bernadette Perrine; Mauritius	48.98A
1999 Johannesburg	Liezl Roux; South Africa	49.38A	Aïda Sellam; Tunisia	48.91A	Sorochukwu Ihuefo; Nigeria	48.24A
2003 Abuja	Aïda Sellam; Tunisia	54.58	Lindy Leveau; Seychelles	53.23	Sunette Viljoen; South Africa	51.68
2007 Algiers	Justine Robbeson; South Africa	58.09	Lindy Leveau; Seychelles	56.49	Sunette Viljoen; South Africa	54.46
2011 Maputo	Justine Robbeson; South Africa	55.33	Gerlize de Klerk; South Africa	52.27	Lindy Agricole; Seychelles	51.26
2015 Brazzaville	Kelechi Nwanaga; Nigeria	52.70	Zuta Mary Nartey; Ghana	50.93	Jo-Ane van Dyk; South Africa	50.52
2019 Rabat	Kelechi Nwanaga; Nigeria	55.88	Jo-Ane van Dyk; South Africa	55.38	Sunette Viljoen; South Africa	53.44

=== Heptathlon ===
Games	Gold		Silver		Bronze	
1987 Nairobi	Yasmina Azzizi; Algeria	5663A	Nacèra Zaaboub; Algeria	5565A	Frida Kiptala; Kenya	4939A
1991 Cairo	Rita Izojie; Nigeria	5383	Oluchi Elechi; Nigeria	5320	Nacèra Zaaboub; Algeria	5253
1995 Harare	Oluchi Elechi; Nigeria	5609A	Maralize Visser; South Africa	5436A	Caroline Kola; Kenya	5248A
1999 Johannesburg	Maralize Fouché (Visser); South Africa	5631A	Patience Itanyi; Nigeria	5565A	Oluchi Elechi; Nigeria	5537A
2003 Abuja	Margaret Simpson; Ghana	6152	Justine Robbeson; South Africa	5697	Patience Okoro; Nigeria	5436
2007 Algiers	Margaret Simpson; Ghana	13.54	Patience Okoro; Nigeria	15.12	Béatrice Kamboulé; Burkina Faso	14.07
2011 Maputo	Margaret Simpson; Ghana	13.71	Gabriela Kouassi; Ivory Coast	13.76	Selloane Tsoaeli; Lesotho	14.62
2015 Brazzaville	Uhunoma Osazuwa; Nigeria	13.86	Odile Ahouanwanou; Benin	14.00	Marthe Koala; Burkina Faso	13.43
2019 Rabat	Marthe Koala; Burkina Faso	5866	Kemi Francis; Nigeria	5683	Nada Chroudi; Tunisia	5302

=== 20 kilometres walk ===
Games	Gold		Silver		Bronze	
2003 Abuja	Estlé Viljoen; South Africa	1:44:29	Amsale Yakobe; Ethiopia	1:47:42	Natalie Fourie; South Africa	1:48:08
2007 Algiers	Chaima Trabelsi; Tunisia	1:49:13	Mercy Njoki; Kenya	1:49:18	Asnakch Ararissa; Ethiopia	1:49:29
2011 Maputo	Chaima Trabelsi; Tunisia	1:40:35	Olfa Lafi; Tunisia	1:41:25	Aynalem Eshetu; Ethiopia	1:42:19
2015 Brazzaville	Grace Wanjiru; Kenya	1:38:28	Aynalem Eshetu; Ethiopia	1:39:49	Askale Tiksa; Ethiopia	1:42:25

=== 4 × 100 metres relay ===
Games	Gold		Silver		Bronze	
1965 Brazzaville	Nigeria	48.0	Ghana	49.1	Cameroon	49.2
1973 Lagos	Ghana	46.25	Nigeria	46.58	Kenya	48.53
1978 Algiers	Nigeria	44.63	Ghana	45.19	Uganda	46.77
1987 Nairobi	Nigeria	43.44A	Ghana	44.43A	Kenya; Geraldine Shitandayi; Ruth Waithera; Esther Kavaya; Jane Wanja	45.24A NR
1991 Cairo	Nigeria	44.21	Ivory Coast	45.86	Madagascar	45.96
1995 Harare	Nigeria	43.43A	Ghana	44.44A	Zimbabwe	45.74A
1999 Johannesburg	Nigeria	43.28A	Madagascar	43.98A	Ghana; Mavis Akoto; Monica Twum; Helena Amoako; Dora Manu	44.21A
2003 Abuja	Nigeria; Emem Edem; Endurance Ojokolo; Chinedu Odozor; Mary Onyali-Omagbemi	43.04 GR	South Africa; Dikeledi Moropane; Heide Seyerling; Geraldine Pillay; Kerryn Hulsen	44.44	Senegal; Aissatou Badji; Fatou Bintou Fall; Aminata Diouf; Aïda Diop	45.42
2007 Algiers	Ghana; Mariama Salifu, Esther Dankwah, Gifty Addy, Vida Anim	43.84	Nigeria; Gladys Nwabani, Endurance Ojokolo, Oludamola Osayomi, Emem Edem	43.85	Ivory Coast; Judith Djaman Brah, Louise Ayétotché, Cynthia Niako, Amandine Allou Affoue	44.48
2011 Maputo	Nigeria	43.34	Ghana	44.33	Cameroon	45.00
2015 Brazzaville	Nigeria; Cecilia Francis; Blessing Okagbare; Ngozi Onwumere; Lawretta Ozoh	43.10	Ghana; Flings Owusu-Agyapong; Gemma Acheampong; Beatrice Gyaman; Janet Amponsah	43.72	Ivory Coast; Rosvitha Okou; Adeline Gouenon; Adjona Triphene Kouame; Marie-Josée Ta Lou	43.98
2019 Rabat	Nigeria; Joy Udo-Gabriel; Jasper Bukola Adekunle; Rosemary Chukwuma; Mercy Ntia-Obong	44.16	South Africa; Tebogo Mamathu; Tamzin Thomas; Patience Ntshingila; Taylon Bieldt	44.61	Kenya; Maximila Imali; Milcent Ndoro; Maureen Nyatichi Thomas; Joan Cherono	45.44

=== 4 × 400 metres relay ===
Games	Gold		Silver		Bronze	
1973 Lagos	Uganda	3:45.42	Nigeria	3:45.69	Kenya	3:46.06
1978 Algiers	Ghana	3:35.55	Kenya	3:39.27	Uganda	3:39.94
1987 Nairobi	Nigeria	3:27.08A	Kenya; Geraldine Shitandayi; Florence Wanjiru; Esther Kavaya; Francisca Chepkurui	3:28.94A NR	Uganda; Farida Kyakutema; Evelyn Adiru; Edith Nakiyingi; Grace Buzu	3:34.41A NR
1991 Cairo	Nigeria	3:31.05	Kenya	3:41.20	Ivory Coast	3:44.06
1995 Harare	Nigeria	3:27.51A	South Africa	3:33.68A	Ghana	3:35.67A
1999 Johannesburg	Nigeria	3:29.22A	Senegal	3:31.63A	Cameroon	3:33.28A
2003 Abuja	Nigeria; Olabisi Afolabi; Glory Nwosu; Doris Jacob; Rosemary Onochie	3:27.76	Cameroon; Hortense Béwouda; Carole Kaboud Mebam; Mireille Nguimgo; Muriel Noah Ahanda	3:31.52	not awarded	
2007 Algiers	Nigeria; Joy Eze, Folashade Abugan, Sekinat Adesanya, Christy Ekpukhon	3:29.74	South Africa; Estie Wittstock, Amanda Kotze, Tihanna Vorster, Tsholofelo Selemela	3:33.62	Sudan; Nawal El Jack, Faiza Omar, Mohamed Hind, Muna Jabir Adam	3:39.79
2011 Maputo	Nigeria	43.34	Ghana	44.33	Cameroon	45.00
2015 Brazzaville	Nigeria; Rita Ossai; Funke Oladoye; Tosin Adeloye; Patience Okon George	3:27.12	Botswana; Lydia Mashila; Goitseone Seleka; Galefele Moroko; Christine Botlogetswe	3:32.84	Kenya; Hellen Syombua; Annet Mwanzi; Winny Chebet; Maureen Nyatichi	3:35.91

== Discontinued events ==
=== 3000 metres ===
Games	Gold		Silver		Bronze	
1987 Nairobi	Susan Sirma; Kenya	9:19.20A	Hellen Kimaiyo; Kenya	9:21.50A	Nata Nangae; Tanzania	9:31.17A
1991 Cairo	Susan Sirma; Kenya	8:49.33	Luchia Yishak; Ethiopia	8:51.04	Delilah Asiago; Kenya	8:55.53

=== Marathon ===
Games	Gold		Silver		Bronze	
1995 Harare	Jowaine Parrott; South Africa	2:55:09A	Emebet Abosa; Ethiopia	3:01:53A	Elfenesh Alemu; Ethiopia	3:08:43A
1999 Johannesburg	Hiywot Gizaw; Ethiopia	2:45:38A	Meseret Kotu; Ethiopia	2:46:29A	Kore Alemu; Ethiopia	2:48:31A
2003 Abuja	Clarisse Rasoarizay; Madagascar	2:46:58	Tadelech Birra; Ethiopia	2:52:04	Leila Aman; Ethiopia	2:55:07

=== 80 metres hurdles ===
Games	Gold		Silver		Bronze	
1965 Brazzaville	Rose Hart; Ghana	11.7	Diana Monks; Kenya	11.8	Mopelope Obayemi; Nigeria	11.9

=== Pentathlon ===
Games	Gold		Silver		Bronze	
1978 Algiers	Bella Bell-Gam; Nigeria	3709	Margaret Bisereko; Uganda	3788	Madeleine Bonzi; Upper Volta	3427

=== 5000 metres track walk ===
Games	Gold		Silver		Bronze	
1987 Nairobi	Agnetha Chelimo; Kenya	25:38.91A	Valeria Ndaliro; Kenya	25:41.15A	Monica Akoth; Kenya	26:03.35A
1991 Cairo	Agnetha Chelimo; Kenya	24:25.00	Grace Karimi; Kenya	24:33.86	Dounia Kara; Algeria	25:27.03
1995 Harare	Dounia Kara; Algeria	23:59.4A	Nagwa Ibrahim Ali; Egypt	24:25.3A	Gete Komar; Ethiopia	24:25.7A

=== 10 kilometres walk ===
Games	Gold		Silver		Bronze	
1999 Johannesburg	Susan Vermeulen; South Africa	49:33A	Nagwa Ibrahim Ali; Egypt	50:19A	Bahia Boussad; Algeria	51:31A
