= 1999 World Championships in Athletics – Women's 200 metres =

These are the official results of the Women's 200 metres event at the 1999 IAAF World Championships in Seville, Spain. There were a total number of 47 participating athletes, with seven qualifying heats, four quarter-finals, two semi-finals and the final held on Friday 27 August 1999 at 19:45h.

== Final ==
RANK	FINAL	TIME
	Inger Miller (USA)	21.77
	Beverly McDonald (JAM)	22.22
	Merlene Frazer (JAM)	22.26
	Andrea Philipp (GER)	22.26
5.	Debbie Ferguson (BAH)	22.28
6.	Fatima Yusuf (NGR)	22.42
7.	Lauren Hewitt (AUS)	22.53
8.	Juliet Campbell (JAM)	22.64

== Semi-final ==
- Held on Wednesday 25 August 1999

RANK	HEAT 1	TIME
1.	Inger Miller (USA)	22.17
2.	Andrea Philipp (GER)	22.25
3.	Beverly McDonald (JAM)	22.26
4.	Fatima Yusuf (NGR)	22.44
5.	Muriel Hurtis (FRA)	22.52
6.	Svetlana Goncharenko (RUS)	22.68
7.	Manuela Levorato (ITA)	22.70
8.	Nova Peris-Kneebone (AUS)	22.74

RANK	HEAT 2	TIME
1.	Merlene Frazer (JAM)	22.18
2.	Debbie Ferguson (BAH)	22.34
3.	Juliet Campbell (JAM)	22.50
4.	Lauren Hewitt (AUS)	22.54
5.	Tania Van Heer (AUS)	22.57
6.	Chandra Sturrup (BAH)	22.75
7.	Natalya Vinogradova-Safronnikova (BLR)	23.16
	Marion Jones (USA)	DNF

== Quarter-finals ==
- Held on Tuesday 24 August 1999

RANK	HEAT 1	TIME
1.	Marion Jones (USA)	22.45
2.	Merlene Frazer (JAM)	22.48
3.	Lauren Hewitt (AUS)	22.73
4.	Chandra Sturrup (BAH)	22.84
5.	Sabrina Mulrain (GER)	22.90
6.	Zuzanna Radecka (POL)	22.96
7.	Lucimar Aparecida de Moura (BRA)	23.14
8.	Wendy Hartman (RSA)	23.28

RANK	HEAT 2	TIME
1.	Beverly McDonald (JAM)	22.26
2.	Fatima Yusuf (NGR)	22.28
3.	Muriel Hurtis (FRA)	22.31
4.	Manuela Levorato (ITA)	22.60
5.	Nanceen Perry (USA)	22.61
6.	Esther Möller (GER)	22.85
7.	Myriam Mani (CMR)	23.14
8.	Kim Gevaert (BEL)	23.16

RANK	HEAT 3	TIME
1.	Inger Miller (USA)	22.49
2.	Svetlana Goncharenko (RUS)	22.77
3.	Andrea Philipp (GER)	22.81
4.	Tania Van Heer (AUS)	22.89
5.	Ekaterini Koffa (GRE)	23.28
6.	Joice Maduaka (GBR)	23.33
7.	Felipa Palacios (COL)	23.46
	Alenka Bikar (SLO)	DNS

RANK	HEAT 4	TIME
1.	Debbie Ferguson (BAH)	22.53
2.	Juliet Campbell (JAM)	22.69
3.	Natalya Vinogradova-Safronnikova (BLR)	22.74
4.	Nova Peris-Kneebone (AUS)	22.76
5.	Marina Trandenkova (RUS)	22.82
6.	Mercy Nku (NGR)	22.83
7.	Christine Bloomfield (GBR)	23.35
	Zhanna Tarnopolskaya-Pintusevich (UKR)	DNS

== Heats ==
- Held on Tuesday 24 August 1999

RANK	HEAT 1	TIME
1.	Tania Van Heer (AUS)	22.67
2.	Andrea Philipp (GER)	22.73
3.	Chandra Sturrup (BAH)	23.18
4.	Ekaterini Koffa (GRE)	23.25
5.	Joice Maduaka (GBR)	23.27
6.	Hana Benešová (CZE)	23.84

RANK	HEAT 2	TIME
1.	Beverly McDonald (JAM)	22.52
2.	Muriel Hurtis (FRA)	22.69
3.	Nanceen Perry (USA)	22.97
4.	Kim Gevaert (BEL)	23.21
5.	Myriam Mani (CMR)	23.37
6.	Heide Seyerling (RSA)	23.59
7.	Lineo Shoai (LES)	25.70

RANK	HEAT 3	TIME
1.	Inger Miller (USA)	22.92
2.	Marina Trandenkova (RUS)	23.04
3.	Juliet Campbell (JAM)	23.07
4.	Lucimar Aparecida de Moura (BRA)	23.34
5.	Aïda Diop (SEN)	23.38
6.	Louise Ayetotche (CIV)	23.54
7.	Julia Alba (ESP)	23.73

RANK	HEAT 4	TIME
1.	Merlene Frazer (JAM)	22.80
2.	Lauren Hewitt (AUS)	22.88
3.	Alenka Bikar (SLO)	22.98
4.	Esther Möller (GER)	23.16
5.	Zhanna Tarnopolskaya-Pintusevich (UKR)	23.19
	Irina Privalova (RUS)	DNS

RANK	HEAT 5	TIME
1.	Debbie Ferguson (BAH)	22.68
2.	Natalya Vinogradova-Safronnikova (BLR)	22.85
3.	Svetlana Goncharenko (RUS)	22.89
4.	Nova Peris-Kneebone (AUS)	22.93
5.	Sabrina Mulrain (GER)	23.07
6.	Ciara Sheehy (IRL)	23.54
7.	Marcia Daniel (DMA)	24.48

RANK	HEAT 6	TIME
1.	Marion Jones (USA)	22.69
2.	Fatima Yusuf (NGR)	22.72
3.	Manuela Levorato (ITA)	22.91
4.	Felipa Palacios (COL)	23.20
5.	Damayanthi Darsha-Kobalavithanage (SRI)	23.57
6.	M'Mah Toure (GUI)	26.35
	Heather Samuel (ATG)	DNS

RANK	HEAT 7	TIME
1.	Mercy Nku (NGR)	22.84
2.	Zuzanna Radecka (POL)	23.01
3.	Wendy Hartman (RSA)	23.27
4.	Christine Bloomfield (GBR)	23.31
5.	Sanna Hernesniemi-Kyllönen (FIN)	23.43
6.	Lyubov Perepelova (UZB)	23.74
	Sevatheda Fynes (BAH)	DNS
