= 2002 African Championships in Athletics – Women's 4 × 100 metres relay =

The women's 4 × 100 metres relay event at the 2002 African Championships in Athletics was held in Radès, Tunisia on August 8.

== Results ==
Rank	Nation	Competitors	Time	Notes
1st place, gold medalist(s)	South Africa	Dikeledi Moropane, Geraldine Pillay, Dominique Koster, Janice Josephs	45.60	
2nd place, silver medalist(s)	Ivory Coast	Christiane Yao, Makaridja Sanganoko, Matagari Diazasouba, Amandine Allou Affoue	47.15	
3rd place, bronze medalist(s)	Ghana	Georgina Sowah, Vida Bruce, Gifty Addy, Aisha Primang	47.41	
	Senegal	Fatoumata Coly, Aissatou Badji, Gnima Faye, Fatou Bintou Fall	DQ	
	Nigeria	Pauline Ibeagha, Edem Emen, Joan Uduak Ekah, Endurance Ojokolo	DNF	
	Algeria	Naima Bentahar, Sarah Bouaoudia, Sarah Arrous, Houria Moussa	DNF	
