= Athletics at the 2003 All-Africa Games – Women's 4 × 100 metres relay =

The women's 4 × 100 metres relay event at the 2003 All-Africa Games was held on October 15.

== Results ==
Rank	Nation	Athletes	Time	Notes
1st place, gold medalist(s)	Nigeria	Emem Edem, Endurance Ojokolo, Chinedu Odozor, Mary Onyali-Omagbemi	43.04	GR
2nd place, silver medalist(s)	South Africa	Dikeledi Moropane, Heide Seyerling, Geraldine Pillay, Kerryn Hulsen	44.44	
3rd place, bronze medalist(s)	Senegal	Aissatou Badji, Fatou Bintou Fall, Aminata Diouf, Aïda Diop	45.42	
4	Ivory Coast	Assetou Bamba, Amandine Allou Affoue, Lucie Akkaty, Louise Ayétotché	45.69	
5	Benin	Sidi Gbadamassi Bayo, Fabienne Feraez, Angele Akpogan, Nijad Inoussa	46.45	
6	Sierra Leone	Bridget Gbanie, Hawanatu Bangura, Marion Bangura, Sarah Bona	48.73	
	Zimbabwe		DNS	
