= 2002 African Championships in Athletics – Women's 200 metres =

The women's 200 metres event at the 2002 African Championships in Athletics was held in Radès, Tunisia on August 9–10.

== Medalists ==
Gold	Silver	Bronze
Nadjina Kaltouma; Chad	Aïda Diop; Senegal	Myriam Léonie Mani; Cameroon

== Results ==
=== Heats ===
Wind:
Heat 1: +1.5 m/s, Heat 2: +3.3 m/s, Heat 3: +1.5 m/s

Rank	Heat	Name	Nationality	Time	Notes
1	2	Nadjina Kaltouma	Chad	23.20	Q
2	3	Aïda Diop	Senegal	23.51	Q
3	1	Myriam Léonie Mani	Cameroon	23.60	Q
4	3	Winneth Dube	Zimbabwe	23.74	Q
5	1	Geraldine Pillay	South Africa	23.75	Q
6	1	Amandine Allou Affoue	Ivory Coast	24.04	q
7	3	Dikeledi Moropane	South Africa	24.17	q
8	1	Sihem El Hanifi	Morocco	24.41	
9	2	Dominique Koster	South Africa	24.50	Q
10	1	Vida Bruce	Ghana	24.75	
11	2	Geraldine Elysée	Mauritius	24.86	
12	3	Houria Moussa	Algeria	25.03	
13	2	Danica Greeff	Namibia	25.43	
14	2	Deborah Bome	Liberia	25.68	
15	2	Aisha Primang	Ghana	25.79	
16	1	Jeannette Dika	Chad	26.83	
17	2	Shewit Tesfaghebriel	Eritrea	27.52	
18	3	Makaridja Sanganoko	Ivory Coast	28.64	
	1	Kassech Chikuala	Ethiopia	DNS	
	1	Ana de Jesus	Angola	DNS	
	2	Edem Emen	Nigeria	DNS	
	3	Awatef Hamrouni	Tunisia	DNS	
	3	Gifty Addy	Ghana	DNS	

=== Final ===
Wind: +2.2 m/s

Rank	Name	Nationality	Time	Notes
1st place, gold medalist(s)	Nadjina Kaltouma	Chad	22.80	
2nd place, silver medalist(s)	Aïda Diop	Senegal	23.29	
3rd place, bronze medalist(s)	Myriam Léonie Mani	Cameroon	23.30	
4	Geraldine Pillay	South Africa	23.67	
5	Winneth Dube	Zimbabwe	23.72	
6	Amandine Allou Affoue	Ivory Coast	23.93	
7	Dominique Koster	South Africa	24.33	
8	Dikeledi Moropane	South Africa	24.56	
