= 1999 World Championships in Athletics – Women's 100 metres =

These are the official results of the Women's 100 metres event at the 1999 IAAF World Championships in Seville, Spain. There were a total number of 51 participating athletes, with seven qualifying heats, four quarter-finals, two semi-finals and the final held on Sunday 22 August 1999 at 21:00h.

== Final ==
RANK	FINAL	TIME
	Marion Jones (USA)	10.70
	Inger Miller (USA)	10.79
	Ekaterini Thanou (GRE)	10.84
4.	Zhanna Tarnopolskaya-Pintusevich (UKR)	10.95
5.	Gail Devers (USA)	10.95
6.	Christine Arron (FRA)	10.97
7.	Chandra Sturrup (BAH)	11.06
8.	Mercy Nku (NGR)	11.16

== Semi-final ==
- Held on Sunday 22 August 1999

RANK	HEAT 1	TIME
1.	Inger Miller (USA)	10.81
2.	Ekaterini Thanou (GRE)	10.83
3.	Chandra Sturrup (BAH)	11.02
4.	Mercy Nku (NGR)	11.11
5.	Liliana Allen (MEX)	11.13
6.	Philomena Mensah (CAN)	11.26
7.	Petya Pendareva (BUL)	11.28
8.	Natalya Vinogradova-Safronnikova (BLR)	11.33

RANK	HEAT 2	TIME
1.	Marion Jones (USA)	10.83
2.	Gail Devers (USA)	10.94
3.	Zhanna Tarnopolskaya-Pintusevich (UKR)	10.98
4.	Christine Arron (FRA)	11.04
5.	Debbie Ferguson (BAH)	11.12
6.	Sevatheda Fynes (BAH)	11.15
7.	Andrea Philipp (GER)	11.27
8.	Lauren Hewitt (AUS)	11.29

== Quarter-finals ==
- Held on Saturday 21 August 1999

RANK	HEAT 1	TIME
1.	Ekaterini Thanou (GRE)	10.86
2.	Chandra Sturrup (BAH)	11.00
3.	Mercy Nku (NGR)	11.09
4.	Gail Devers (USA)	11.10
5.	Katia Benth (FRA)	11.28
6.	Wendy Hartman (RSA)	11.46
7.	Oksana Dyachenko-Ekk (RUS)	11.60
8.	Peta-Gaye Dowdie (JAM)	12.01

RANK	HEAT 2	TIME
1.	Inger Miller (USA)	10.86
2.	Zhanna Tarnopolskaya-Pintusevich (UKR)	10.94
3.	Andrea Philipp (GER)	11.06
4.	Liliana Allen (MEX)	11.10
5.	Endurance Ojokolo (NGR)	11.14
6.	Joice Maduaka (GBR)	11.28
7.	Nova Peris-Kneebone (AUS)	11.36
8.	Johanna Manninen (FIN)	11.45

RANK	HEAT 3	TIME
1.	Christine Arron (FRA)	11.00
2.	Philomena Mensah (CAN)	11.09
3.	Sevatheda Fynes (BAH)	11.20
4.	Lauren Hewitt (AUS)	11.28
5.	Cheryl Taplin (USA)	11.33
6.	Natalya Ignatova (RUS)	11.39
7.	Marion Wagner (GER)	11.51
8.	Kim Gevaert (BEL)	11.54

RANK	HEAT 4	TIME
1.	Marion Jones (USA)	10.76
2.	Debbie Ferguson (BAH)	11.06
3.	Natalya Vinogradova-Safronnikova (BLR)	11.17
4.	Petya Pendareva (BUL)	11.19
5.	Lucimar Aparecida de Moura (BRA)	11.31
6.	Martha Adusei (CAN)	11.64
	Irina Privalova (RUS)	DNS
	Susanthika Jayasinghe (SRI)	DNS

== Heats ==
- Held on Saturday 21 August 1999

RANK	HEAT 1	TIME
1.	Marion Jones (USA)	11.22
2.	Andrea Philipp (GER)	11.38
3.	Lauren Hewitt (AUS)	11.41
4.	Kim Gevaert (BEL)	11.48
5.	Christine Bloomfield (GBR)	11.61
6.	Shieh Li Tan (SIN)	12.40
7.	Anais Oyembo (GAB)	12.46

RANK	HEAT 2	TIME
1.	Christine Arron (FRA)	11.10
2.	Irina Privalova (RUS)	11.45
3.	Cheryl Taplin (USA)	11.45
4.	Wendy Hartman (RSA)	11.49
5.	Aminata Diouf (SEN)	11.65
6.	Monica Twum (GHA)	11.70
7.	Jennifer Caraballo (PUR)	12.43

RANK	HEAT 3	TIME
1.	Inger Miller (USA)	11.21
2.	Debbie Ferguson (BAH)	11.34
3.	Katia Benth (FRA)	11.42
4.	Joice Maduaka (GBR)	11.43
5.	Marion Wagner (GER)	11.57
6.	Heather Samuel (ATG)	11.65
7.	Joanna Houareau (SEY)	12.14
8.	Ekundayo Williams (SLE)	13.08

RANK	HEAT 4	TIME
1.	Chandra Sturrup (BAH)	11.32
2.	Liliana Allen (MEX)	11.39
3.	Susanthika Jayasinghe (SRI)	11.42
4.	Johanna Manninen (FIN)	11.52
5.	Nova Peris-Kneebone (AUS)	11.52
6.	Oksana Dyachenko-Ekk (RUS)	11.54
7.	Hanitriniaina Rakotondrabe (MAD)	11.59

RANK	HEAT 5	TIME
1.	Ekaterini Thanou (GRE)	11.10
2.	Philomena Mensah (CAN)	11.24
3.	Mercy Nku (NGR)	11.38
4.	Natalya Vinogradova-Safronnikova (BLR)	11.44
5.	Myriam Mani (CMR)	11.61
6.	Gabriele Rockmeier (GER)	11.62
7.	Litiana Miller (FIJ)	14.23

RANK	HEAT 6	TIME
1.	Petya Pendareva (BUL)	11.16
2.	Sevatheda Fynes (BAH)	11.21
3.	Endurance Ojokolo (NGR)	11.42
4.	Lucimar Aparecida de Moura (BRA)	11.51
5.	Martha Adusei (CAN)	11.53
6.	Emma Wade (BIZ)	12.30
7.	Yah Koïta (MLI)	12.48

RANK	HEAT 7	TIME
1.	Zhanna Tarnopolskaya-Pintusevich (UKR)	11.20
2.	Gail Devers (USA)	11.32
3.	Natalya Ignatova (RUS)	11.40
4.	Peta-Gaye Dowdie (JAM)	11.44
5.	Motoka Arai (JPN)	11.64
6.	Lyubov Perepelova (UZB)	11.78
7.	Siulolo Liku (TON)	12.78
8.	Lucy Seiulialii (SAM)	15.61
