= Athletics at the 2003 All-Africa Games – Women's heptathlon =

The men's heptathlon event at the 2003 All-Africa Games was held on October 13–14.

== Results ==
The highest mark recorded in each event is highlighted in yellow

Rank	Athlete	Nationality	100m H	HJ	SP	200m	LJ	JT	800m	Points	Notes
1st place, gold medalist(s)	Margaret Simpson	Ghana	13.47	1.81	12.09	24.72	6.11	50.59	2:23.94	6152	
2nd place, silver medalist(s)	Justine Robbeson	South Africa	13.82	1.78	11.91	25.19	5.93	45.52	2:36.47	5697	
3rd place, bronze medalist(s)	Patience Okoro	Nigeria	14.33	1.72	13.67	25.59	5.74	38.38	2:36.58	5436	
4	Sarah Bouaoudia	Algeria	14.56	1.72	9.95	25.73	5.80	28.07	2:17.95	5208	
5	Hanen Dhouibi	Tunisia	16.22	1.75	11.84	27.42	5.39	37.57	2:32.14	4887	
	Céline Laporte	Seychelles	14.42	1.69	9.76	25.88	3.58	37.56	DNS	DNF	
	Oluchi Eleche	Nigeria	14.71	1.57	12.96	26.86	5.86	DNS	–	DNF	
	Mamy Rarivoarimanana	Madagascar	15.06	1.54	10.79	DNS	–	–	–	DNF	
	Stéphanie Domaingue	Mauritius	15.01	1.57	7.90	DNS	–	–	–	DNF	
