= 1999 IAAF World Indoor Championships – Women's 60 metres =

The women's 60 metres event at the 1999 IAAF World Indoor Championships was held on March 7.

== Medalists ==
Gold	Silver	Bronze
Ekaterini Thanou; Greece	Gail Devers; United States	Philomena Mensah; Canada

- Inger Miller originally won the bronze but was disqualified for excessive caffeine level.

== Results ==
=== Heats ===
First 2 of each heat (Q) and next 8 fastest (q) qualified for the semifinals.

Rank	Heat	Name	Nationality	Time	Notes
1	1	Ekaterini Thanou	Greece	7.01	Q, NR
2	2	Philomena Mensah	Canada	7.02	Q, NR
3	4	Sevatheda Fynes	Bahamas	7.08	Q
4	2	Joan Uduak Ekah	Nigeria	7.10	Q, WJR
5	3	Endurance Ojokolo	Nigeria	7.12	Q, PB
6	4	Liliana Allen	Mexico	7.14	Q, NR
6	1	Gail Devers	United States	7.14	Q
8	2	Wendy Hartman	South Africa	7.17	q, NR
8	4	Petya Pendareva	Bulgaria	7.17	q
10	2	Andrea Philipp	Germany	7.18	q, PB
11	3	Sandra Citte	France	7.19	q
12	1	Manuela Levorato	Italy	7.25	q, PB
13	1	Alenka Bikar	Slovenia	7.26	q, PB
14	3	Hanitriniaina Rakotondrabe	Madagascar	7.27	q, PB
15	1	Anzhelika Shevchuk	Ukraine	7.31	
15	3	Zuzanna Radecka	Poland	7.31	q, PB
17	2	Christine Bloomfield	Great Britain	7.32	PB
17	4	Li Xuemei	China	7.32	
17	4	Natallia Safronnikava	Belarus	7.32	
20	4	Marzena Pawlak	Poland	7.36	PB
21	4	Janine Whitlock	Great Britain	7.39	PB
22	1	Heather Samuel	Antigua and Barbuda	7.41	
23	3	Saša Prokofijev	Slovenia	7.43	PB
24	2	Agnė Visockaitė	Lithuania	7.45	
25	1	Lyubov Perepelova	Uzbekistan	7.51	
26	2	Motoka Arai	Japan	7.54	
27	1	Elena Bobrovskaya	Kyrgyzstan	7.64	
28	3	Tamara Shanidze	Georgia	7.66	
29	3	Monica Jonathan	Papua New Guinea	8.06	
30	4	Ruth Babela Walozontsi	Republic of the Congo	8.48	
	3	Inger Miller	United States	DQ	
	2	Nora Ivanova	Bulgaria	DNS	

=== Semifinals ===
First 3 of each semifinal (Q) and next 2 fastest (q) qualified for the final.

Rank	Heat	Name	Nationality	Time	Notes
1	1	Ekaterini Thanou	Greece	6.99	Q, NR
2	1	Sevatheda Fynes	Bahamas	7.01	Q, NR
3	1	Gail Devers	United States	7.07	Q
3	2	Philomena Mensah	Canada	7.07	Q
5	2	Endurance Ojokolo	Nigeria	7.08	Q, PB
6	2	Petya Pendareva	Bulgaria	7.08	q, PB
7	1	Joan Uduak Ekah	Nigeria	7.09	q, WJR
8	2	Liliana Allen	Mexico	7.12	NR
9	1	Wendy Hartman	South Africa	7.15	NR
10	2	Andrea Philipp	Germany	7.17	PB
11	1	Manuela Levorato	Italy	7.20	PB
12	1	Sandra Citte	France	7.20	
13	2	Alenka Bikar	Slovenia	7.24	PB
14	2	Hanitriniaina Rakotondrabe	Madagascar	7.34	
15	1	Zuzanna Radecka	Poland	7.37	
	2	Inger Miller	United States	DQ	

=== Final ===
Rank	Lane	Name	Nationality	Time	Notes
1st place, gold medalist(s)	6	Ekaterini Thanou	Greece	6.96	WL, NR
2nd place, silver medalist(s)	7	Gail Devers	United States	7.02	
3rd place, bronze medalist(s)	5	Philomena Mensah	Canada	7.07	
4	4	Sevatheda Fynes	Bahamas	7.09	
5	8	Joan Uduak Ekah	Nigeria	7.10	
6	2	Petya Pendareva	Bulgaria	7.12	
7	1	Endurance Ojokolo	Nigeria	7.19	
	3	Inger Miller	United States	DQ	
