= Athletics at the 2003 All-Africa Games – Women's triple jump =

Athletics event

The women's triple jump event at the 2003 All-Africa Games was held on October 12.

== Results ==
Rank	Name	Nationality	Result	Notes
1st place, gold medalist(s)	Kéné Ndoye	Senegal	14.23	
2nd place, silver medalist(s)	Salamatu Alimi	Nigeria	13.47	
3rd place, bronze medalist(s)	Nkechi Mbaoma	Nigeria	13.18	
4	Rapitsara Volazandry	Madagascar	13.17	
5	Béatrice Kamboulé	Burkina Faso	12.94	
6	Linda Osifo	Nigeria	12.79	
7	Mariette Mien	Burkina Faso	12.73	
	Françoise Mbango Etone	Cameroon	DNS	
