= 2004 African Championships in Athletics – Women's 100 metres =

The women's 100 metres event at the 2004 African Championships in Athletics was held in Brazzaville, Republic of the Congo on July 14–15.

== Medalists ==
Gold	Silver	Bronze
Endurance Ojokolo; Nigeria	Mercy Nku; Nigeria	Geraldine Pillay; South Africa

== Results ==
=== Heats ===
Wind:
Heat 1: +1.3 m/s, Heat 2: +1.1 m/s, Heat 3: +1.9 m/s, Heat 4: +1.1 m/s

Rank	Heat	Name	Nationality	Time	Notes
1	1	Geraldine Pillay	South Africa	11.56	Q
2	1	Endurance Ojokolo	Nigeria	11.70	Q
3	1	Sidi Gbadamassi Bayo	Benin	12.12	Q
4	1	Michelle Banga Moundzoula	Republic of the Congo	12.25	
5	1	Amili Botowa Mungu	Democratic Republic of the Congo	12.67	
1	2	Kadiatou Camara	Mali	11.84	Q
2	2	Fatoumata Coly	Senegal	12.07	Q
3	2	Sarah Tondé	Burkina Faso	12.11	Q
4	2	Charlotte Mebenga	Cameroon	12.23	
5	2	Melanie Atsio-Gouamali	Republic of the Congo	12.54	
1	3	Delphine Atangana	Cameroon	11.72	Q
2	3	Damola Osayomi	Nigeria	11.80	Q
3	3	Fabienne Feraez	Benin	11.83	Q
4	3	Assetou Bamba	Ivory Coast	12.12	q
5	3	Dikeledi Moropane	South Africa	12.13	q
6	3	Aissatou Badji	Senegal	12.31	
1	4	Mercy Nku	Nigeria	11.68	Q
2	4	Amandine Allou Affoue	Ivory Coast	11.68	Q
3	4	Winneth Dube	Zimbabwe	11.88	Q
4	4	Wendy Seegers	South Africa	11.96	q
5	4	Yah Koïta	Mali	12.10	q
6	4	Nana Blakime	Togo	12.62	

=== Semifinals ===
Wind:
Heat 1: +0.1 m/s, Heat 2: +0.1 m/s

Rank	Heat	Name	Nationality	Time	Notes
1	1	Endurance Ojokolo	Nigeria	11.40	Q
2	2	Mercy Nku	Nigeria	11.41	Q
3	2	Delphine Atangana	Cameroon	11.48	Q
4	1	Geraldine Pillay	South Africa	11.50	Q
5	1	Amandine Allou Affoue	Ivory Coast	11.53	Q
6	1	Damola Osayomi	Nigeria	11.55	Q
7	1	Kadiatou Camara	Mali	11.57	
8	2	Winneth Dube	Zimbabwe	11.76	Q
9	2	Fabienne Feraez	Benin	11.78	Q
10	2	Fatoumata Coly	Senegal	11.97	
11	2	Yah Koïta	Mali	12.00	
12	2	Assetou Bamba	Ivory Coast	12.13	
13	1	Sidi Gbadamassi Bayo	Benin	12.17	
13	2	Wendy Seegers	South Africa	12.17	
15	1	Sarah Tondé	Burkina Faso	12.18	
	1	Dikeledi Moropane	South Africa	DNS	

=== Final ===
Wind: +0.2 m/s

Rank	Name	Nationality	Time	Notes
1st place, gold medalist(s)	Endurance Ojokolo	Nigeria	11.33	
2nd place, silver medalist(s)	Mercy Nku	Nigeria	11.36	
3rd place, bronze medalist(s)	Geraldine Pillay	South Africa	11.40	
4	Damola Osayomi	Nigeria	11.40	
5	Amandine Allou Affoue	Ivory Coast	11.54	
6	Delphine Atangana	Cameroon	11.55	
7	Winneth Dube	Zimbabwe	11.73	
	Fabienne Feraez	Benin	DQ	
