= Wendy Seegers =

South African sprinter

Wendy Seegers (née Hartman; born 28 February 1976) is a South African former sprinter. She represented South Africa at the 1999 Indoor and Outdoor Championships. Seegers is currently a masters runner in Australia, setting many national W35 sprint records. Ran 55.72 on 17/12/15 for 400m to set the national 35-39 Australian record. This adds to her records for 60m of 7.61, 100m of 12.01 and 200m of 24.42. On 3 March 2016 Seegers set a W40 Australian record of 24.52 for the 200m. She followed this with another Australian record of 12.18 for W40 100m. This time was close to her personal best.

At the 2016 World Masters Championships in Perth, Seegers won the W40 100 m and 200 m events. Her 100m time of 11.88 (+3.4) was the fastest women's time overall and she was the only woman to run below 12 seconds. Seegers led both relays to victory to remain undefeated at the championships.

Competition record

Year	Competition	Venue	Position	Event	Notes
Representing South Africa
1999	World Indoor Championships	Maebashi, Japan	9th (sf)	60 m	7.15
1999	World Indoor Championships	Maebashi, Japan	8th (sf)	200 m	23.21
1999	World Championships	Seville, Spain	25th (qf)	100 m	11.46
1999	World Championships	Seville, Spain	26th (qf)	200 m	23.28
1999	World Championships	Seville, Spain	11th (h)	4x100 m relay	44.35
1999	All-Africa Games	Johannesburg, South Africa	5th	100 m	11.39
1999	All-Africa Games	Johannesburg, South Africa	4th	200 m	23.20
2004	African Championships	Brazzaville, Republic of the Congo	13th (sf)	100 m	12.17

== Personal bests ==
Outdoor

- 100 metres – 11.18 (-1.0 m/s) (Pretoria 1999)
- 200 metres – 22.74 (-1.1 m/s) (Roodepoort 1999)

Indoor

- 60 metres – 7.15 (Maebashi 1999) NR
- 200 metres – 23.16 (Maebashi 1999) NR
