= Emem =

- Gender: Unisex

Origin
- Language: Ibibio
- Origin: Nigerian
- Derivation: Emmy
- Meaning: Peace
- Region of origin: South-south

Emem is a Nigerian unisex given name of Ibibio origin which means "peace", though it is now used predominantly for females.

== Notable people with the name ==
- Emem Edem (born 1983), retired Nigerian sprinter
- Emem Eduok (born 1994), Nigerian footballer
- Emem Isong (born 1979), Nigerian filmmaker
