= 2004 African Championships in Athletics – Women's 4 × 100 metres relay =

The women's 4 × 100 metres relay event at the 2004 African Championships in Athletics was held in Brazzaville, Republic of the Congo on July 16.

== Results ==
Rank	Nation	Competitors	Time	Notes
1st place, gold medalist(s)	Nigeria	Gloria Kemasuode, Mercy Nku, Damola Osayomi, Endurance Ojokolo	44.32	
2nd place, silver medalist(s)	South Africa	Dikeledi Moropane, Heide Seyerling, Adri Schoeman, Geraldine Pillay	44.42	
3rd place, bronze medalist(s)	Senegal	Fatoumata Coly, Aïda Diop, Aissatou Badji, Aminata Diouf	45.21	
4	Cameroon	Jacquette Mekoa Mve, Charlotte Mebenga, Blandine Fonkeu, Delphine Atangana	45.63	
5	Ghana	Mercy Tabiri, Smart Abbey, Aisha Pinamang, Gifty Addy	46.07	
6	Burkina Faso	Mariette Mien, Aïssata Soulama, Sarah Tondé, Béatrice Kamboulé	46.77	NR
	Republic of the Congo	Juscarelle Kibouanga, Michelle Banga Moundzoula, Solène Eboulabeka, Melanie Atsio-Gouamali	DQ	
