= Béatrice Kamboulé =

Burkinabé athlete

Béatrice Kamboulé (born 25 February 1980) is a Burkinabé athlete who competes in the 100 metres hurdles, long jump, triple jump as well as the heptathlon.

She competed in the 100 metres hurdles at the 2011 World Championships without qualifying for the semifinals.

== Competition record ==
Year	Competition	Venue	Position	Event	Notes
Representing Burkina Faso
1999	African Junior Championships	Tunis, Tunisia	8th	Long jump	4.90 m
1999	African Junior Championships	Tunis, Tunisia	4th	Triple jump	11.27 m (w)
2002	African Championships	Radès, Tunisia	12th	Long jump	5.25 m
2002	African Championships	Radès, Tunisia	4th	Triple jump	12.58 m
2003	All-Africa Games	Abuja, Nigeria	5th	Triple jump	12.94 m
2004	African Championships	Brazzaville, Republic of the Congo	6th	4 × 100 m relay	46.77 s
2004	African Championships	Brazzaville, Republic of the Congo	7th	Long jump	5.82 m
2005	Jeux de la Francophonie	Niamey, Niger	7th (h)	100 m hurdles	14.32 s
2005	Jeux de la Francophonie	Niamey, Niger	3rd	4 × 100 m relay	45.99 s
2005	Jeux de la Francophonie	Niamey, Niger	3rd	Triple jump	13.05 m
2006	African Championships	Bambous, Mauritius	6th	Triple jump	13.19 m (w)
2007	All-Africa Games	Algiers, Algeria	4th	100 m hurdles	13.76 s
2007	All-Africa Games	Algiers, Algeria	7th	Triple jump	13.05 m
2007	All-Africa Games	Algiers, Algeria	3rd	Heptathlon	4994 pts
2008	African Championships	Addis Ababa, Ethiopia	7th	4 × 100 m relay	50.37 s
2008	African Championships	Addis Ababa, Ethiopia	–	Heptathlon	DNF
2009	Jeux de la Francophonie	Beirut, Lebanon	3rd	Heptathlon	4861 pts
2011	World Championships	Daegu, South Korea	35th (h)	100 m hurdles	13.76 s
