= Athletics at the 2003 All-Africa Games – Women's 100 metres =

The women's 100 metres at the 2003 All-Africa Games were held on October 11–12.

== Medalists ==
Gold	Silver	Bronze
Mary Onyali-Omagbemi; Nigeria (NGR)	Endurance Ojokolo; Nigeria (NGR)	Vida Anim; Ghana (GHA)

== Results ==
=== Heats ===
Qualification: First 3 of each heat (Q) and the next 4 fastest (q) qualified for the semifinals.

Wind:
Heat 1: +0.4 m/s, Heat 2: -0.1 m/s, Heat 3: -0.3 m/s, Heat 4: +0.1 m/s

Rank	Heat	Name	Nationality	Time	Notes
1	1	Mary Onyali-Omagbemi	Nigeria	11.24	Q
2	2	Endurance Ojokolo	Nigeria	11.33	Q
3	4	Vida Anim	Ghana	11.35	Q
4	2	Delphine Atangana	Cameroon	11.39	Q
5	1	Geraldine Pillay	South Africa	11.42	Q
6	3	Aminata Diouf	Senegal	11.61	Q
6	4	Kadiatou Camara	Mali	11.61	Q
8	2	Amandine Allou Affoue	Ivory Coast	11.69	Q
8	4	Winneth Dube	Zimbabwe	11.69	Q
10	3	Emem Edem	Nigeria	11.79	Q
11	2	Dikeledi Moropane	South Africa	11.84	q
12	1	Hellen Chemtai	Kenya	11.98	Q
13	1	Elisa Cossa	Mozambique	12.02	q
14	1	Veronica Wabukawo	Uganda	12.10	q
15	3	Justine Bayiga	Uganda	12.12	Q
16	4	Fatoumata Coly	Senegal	12.15	q
17	4	Sarah Bonah	Sierra Leone	12.18	
18	4	Michelle Banga Moundzoula	Republic of the Congo	12.26	
19	1	Aissatou Badji	Senegal	12.34	
20	4	Assetou Bamba	Ivory Coast	12.36	
21	3	Sandra Chimwanza	Zimbabwe	12.40	
22	4	Ivonnde Djato	Chad	12.56	
23	3	Hawanatu Bangura	Sierra Leone	12.71	
24	3	Marang Kinteh	Gambia	12.79	
25	2	Roseline Amara	Sierra Leone	13.03	
26	1	Aminata Kamissoko	Mauritania	13.75	
	1	Alice Ayard	Central African Republic	DNS	
	2	Maria-Joëlle Conjungo	Central African Republic	DNS	
	2	Marie-Jeanne Binga	Gabon	DNS	
	2	M'mah Touré	Guinea	DNS	
	3	Lucie Akatty	Ivory Coast	DNS	
	3	Genevieve Obone	Gabon	DNS	
	4	Mariette Mien	Burkina Faso	DNS	

=== Semifinals ===
Qualification: First 4 of each semifinal (Q) qualified for the final.

Wind:
Heat 1: +0.5 m/s, Heat 2: 0.0 m/s

Rank	Heat	Name	Nationality	Time	Notes
1	2	Endurance Ojokolo	Nigeria	11.16	Q
2	1	Mary Onyali-Omagbemi	Nigeria	11.18	Q
3	1	Delphine Atangana	Cameroon	11.24	Q
4	2	Vida Anim	Ghana	11.29	Q
5	2	Geraldine Pillay	South Africa	11.39	Q
6	1	Amandine Allou Affoue	Ivory Coast	11.49	Q
7	1	Winneth Dube	Zimbabwe	11.53	Q
8	1	Aminata Diouf	Senegal	11.58	
9	2	Emem Edem	Nigeria	11.63	Q
10	2	Kadiatou Camara	Mali	11.67	
11	1	Dikeledi Moropane	South Africa	11.78	
12	1	Elisa Cossa	Mozambique	11.99	
13	2	Hellen Chemtai	Kenya	12.02	
14	1	Veronica Wabukawo	Uganda	12.05	
14	2	Justine Bayiga	Uganda	12.05	
	2	Fatoumata Coly	Senegal	DNS	

=== Final ===
Wind: +0.2 m/s

Rank	Name	Nationality	Time	Notes
1st place, gold medalist(s)	Mary Onyali-Omagbemi	Nigeria	11.26	
2nd place, silver medalist(s)	Endurance Ojokolo	Nigeria	11.26	
3rd place, bronze medalist(s)	Vida Anim	Ghana	11.29	
4	Geraldine Pillay	South Africa	11.38	
5	Delphine Atangana	Cameroon	11.49	
6	Emem Edem	Nigeria	11.53	
7	Amandine Allou Affoue	Ivory Coast	11.57	
8	Winneth Dube	Zimbabwe	11.62	
