= 2002 African Championships in Athletics – Women's 100 metres =

The women's 100 metres event at the 2002 African Championships in Athletics was held in Radès, Tunisia on August 6–7.

== Medalists ==
Gold	Silver	Bronze
Endurance Ojokolo; Nigeria	Myriam Léonie Mani; Cameroon	Chinedu Odozor; Nigeria

== Results ==
=== Heats ===
Wind:
Heat 1: +4.7 m/s, Heat 2: +3.9 m/s, Heat 3: +3.9 m/s

Rank	Heat	Name	Nationality	Time	Notes
1	2	Endurance Ojokolo	Nigeria	11.21	Q
2	2	Chinedu Odozor	Nigeria	11.29	Q
3	1	Myriam Léonie Mani	Cameroon	11.30	Q
4	1	Makaridja Sanganoko	Ivory Coast	11.32	Q
5	3	Aminata Diouf	Senegal	11.37	Q
6	2	Grace-Ann Dinkins	Liberia	11.56	q
7	2	Janice Josephs	South Africa	11.60	
8	1	Amandine Allou Affoue	Ivory Coast	11.62	q
9	1	Siham El Hanifi	Morocco	11.71	
10	3	Awatef Hamrouni	Tunisia	11.72	Q
11	1	Aissatou Badji	Senegal	11.83	
12	2	Kadiatou Camara	Mali	11.86	
13	3	Sarah Tondé	Burkina Faso	11.97	
14	3	Yah Koïta	Mali	11.99	
15	1	Vida Bruce	Ghana	12.08	
16	2	Aisha Primang	Ghana	12.23	
17	3	Danica Greef	Namibia	12.30	
18	3	Angele Akplogan	Benin	12.56	
19	2	Marie-Jeanne Binga	Gabon	12.57	
20	2	Ana de Jesus	Angola	12.71	
21	1	Jeannette Dika	Chad	12.82	
22	3	Shewit Tesfagabriel	Eritrea	13.43	
	1	Winneth Dube	Zimbabwe	DNS	
	3	Gifty Addy	Ghana	DNS	
	3	Claris Malasi Lomba	Democratic Republic of the Congo	DNS	

=== Final ===
Wind: +4.1 m/s

Rank	Name	Nationality	Time	Notes
1st place, gold medalist(s)	Endurance Ojokolo	Nigeria	11.15	
2nd place, silver medalist(s)	Myriam Léonie Mani	Cameroon	11.29	
3rd place, bronze medalist(s)	Chinedu Odozor	Nigeria	11.32	
4	Makaridja Sanganoko	Ivory Coast	11.51	
5	Amandine Allou Affoue	Ivory Coast	11.66	
6	Grace-Ann Dinkins	Liberia	11.69	
7	Awatef Hamrouni	Tunisia	11.83	
	Aminata Diouf	Senegal	DNF	
