= 2008 African Championships in Athletics – Women's heptathlon =

The women's heptathlon event at the 2008 African Championships in Athletics was held at the Addis Ababa Stadium on May 2–3.

== Medalists ==
Gold	Silver	Bronze
Patience Okoro; Nigeria	Florence Wasike; Kenya	Nadège Essama Foe; Cameroon

== Results ==
=== 100 metres hurdles ===
Wind: –1.4 m/s

Rank	Lane	Name	Nationality	Time	Points	Notes
1	6	Béatrice Kamboulé	Burkina Faso	14.17	954	
2	2	Florence Wasike	Kenya	14.67	886	
3	5	Patience Okoro	Nigeria	14.73	878	
4	4	Fatima Zahra Dkouk	Morocco	14.97	846	
5	3	Nadège Essama Foe	Cameroon	15.23	811	
6	7	Selloane Tsoaeli	Lesotho	15.38	792	NR

=== High jump ===
Rank	Athlete	Nationality	1.30	1.33	1.36	1.39	1.42	1.45	1.48	1.51	1.54	1.57	1.60	1.63	1.66	1.69	1.72	1.75	Result	Points	Notes	Overall
1	Selloane Tsoaeli	Lesotho	–	–	–	–	–	–	–	o	o	o	o	xo	o	o	xxo	xxx	1.72	879	NR	1671
2	Béatrice Kamboulé	Burkina Faso	–	–	–	o	o	o	o	o	o	xo	o	o	xxx				1.63	771		1725
3	Patience Okoro	Nigeria	–	–	–	–	–	o	o	o	o	o	o	xxx					1.60	736		1614
4	Fatima Zahra Dkouk	Morocco	o	–	–	o	o	o	xo	o	xxx								1.51	632		1478
5	Florence Wasike	Kenya	o	o	o	o	o	o	xx–	x									1.45	566		1452
6	Nadège Essama Foe	Cameroon	xo	o	–	o	xxx												1.39	502		1313

=== Shot put ===
Rank	Athlete	Nationality	#1	#2	#3	Result	Points	Notes	Overall
1	Patience Okoro	Nigeria	x	12.41	12.34	12.41	688		2302
2	Nadège Essama Foe	Cameroon	12.07	12.05	11.78	12.07	666		1979
3	Béatrice Kamboulé	Burkina Faso	8.20	10.01	9.45	10.01	530		2255
4	Selloane Tsoaeli	Lesotho	9.42	9.18	8.98	9.42	492		2163
5	Florence Wasike	Kenya	8.66	8.64	9.20	9.20	477		1929
6	Fatima Zahra Dkouk	Morocco	7.43	8.19	8.27	8.27	417		1895

=== 200 metres ===
Wind: -3.6 m/s

Rank	Lane	Name	Nationality	Time	Points	Notes	Overall
1	3	Florence Wasike	Kenya	25.09	879		2808
2	7	Béatrice Kamboulé	Burkina Faso	25.35	855		3110
3	2	Nadège Essama Foe	Cameroon	25.35	855		2834
4	6	Fatima Zahra Dkouk	Morocco	25.64	829		2724
5	5	Patience Okoro	Nigeria	25.96	801		3103
6	4	Selloane Tsoaeli	Lesotho	26.42	761		2924

=== Long jump ===
Rank	Athlete	Nationality	#1	#2	#3	Result	Points	Notes	Overall
1	Selloane Tsoaeli	Lesotho	5.49	5.54	5.56	5.56	717	NR	3641
2	Fatima Zahra Dkouk	Morocco	5.55	x	x	5.55	715		3439
3	Florence Wasike	Kenya	5.45	x	5.22	5.45	686		3494
4	Patience Okoro	Nigeria	4.82	5.37	5.04	5.37	663		3766
5	Nadège Essama Foe	Cameroon	4.50	4.74	4.41	4.74	490		3324
	Béatrice Kamboulé	Burkina Faso				DNS	490		DNF

=== Javelin throw ===
Rank	Athlete	Nationality	#1	#2	#3	Result	Points	Notes	Overall
1	Patience Okoro	Nigeria	38.13	40.98	37.40	40.98	686		4452
2	Nadège Essama Foe	Cameroon	28.27	x	30.29	30.29	482		3806
3	Florence Wasike	Kenya	x	26.44	29.85	29.85	474		3968
4	Fatima Zahra Dkouk	Morocco	x	17.64	19.76	19.76	284		3723
	Selloane Tsoaeli	Lesotho	x	x	x	NM	0		3641

=== 800 metres ===
Rank	Name	Nationality	Time	Points	Notes
1	Florence Wasike	Kenya	2:14.53	899	
2	Selloane Tsoaeli	Lesotho	2:24.56	763	
3	Nadège Essama Foe	Cameroon	2:32.36	664	
4	Patience Okoro	Nigeria	2:50.92	454	
	Fatima Zahra Dkouk	Morocco	DNF	0	

=== Final standings ===
The highest mark recorded in each event is highlighted in yellow

Rank	Athlete	Nationality	100m H	HJ	SP	200m	LJ	JT	800m	Points	Notes
1st place, gold medalist(s)	Patience Okoro	Nigeria	14.73	1.60	12.41	25.96	5.37	40.98	2:50.92	4906	
2nd place, silver medalist(s)	Florence Wasike	Kenya	14.67	1.45	9.20	25.09	5.45	29.85	2:14.53	4867	
3rd place, bronze medalist(s)	Nadège Essama Foe	Cameroon	15.23	1.39	12.07	25.35	4.74	30.29	2:32.36	4470	
4	Selloane Tsoaeli	Lesotho	15.38	1.72	9.42	26.42	5.56	NM	2:24.56	4404	NR
5	Fatima Zahra Dkouk	Morocco	14.97	1.51	8.27	25.64	5.55	19.76	DNF	3723	
	Béatrice Kamboulé	Burkina Faso	14.17	1.63	10.01	25.35	DNS	–	–	DNF	
