= 2002 African Championships in Athletics – Women's heptathlon =

The women's heptathlon event at the 2002 African Championships in Athletics was held in Radès, Tunisia on August 6–7.

== Results ==
The highest mark recorded in each event is highlighted in gold.

Rank	Athlete	Nationality	100m H	HJ	SP	200m	LJ	JT	800m	Points	Notes
1st place, gold medalist(s)	Margaret Simpson	Ghana	13.93	1.84	11.65	24.62	6.13w	51.10	2:24.97	6105	
2nd place, silver medalist(s)	Stéphanie Domaingue	Mauritius	14.36	1.63	10.33	26.47	5.93w	37.93	2:26.06	5206	
3rd place, bronze medalist(s)	Imène Chatbri	Tunisia	15.04	1.57	11.47	26.62	5.47w	41.80	2:21.52	5206	
4	Paulette Mendy	Senegal	15.10	1.54	10.05	24.89	5.85	36.13	2:47.59	4810	
5	Soraya Mehdioui	Algeria	15.93	1.57	11.80	26.62	5.20	34.24	2:28.04	4705	
	Hanen Dhouibi	Tunisia	15.67	1.75	12.73	26.59	4.48	39.49	DNS	DNF	
	Karima Ben Othmani	Tunisia	14.96	1.69	10.03	27.27	5.39w	30.69	DNS	DNF	
	Nacera Belegroun	Algeria	15.02	1.60	9.33	26.74	DNS	–	–	DNF	
