= Athletics at the 2007 All-Africa Games – Women's heptathlon =

The women's heptathlon at the 2007 All-Africa Games was held on July 20–21.

== Results ==
The highest mark recorded in each event is highlighted in yellow

Rank	Athlete	Nationality	100m H	HJ	SP	200m	LJ	JT	800m	Points	Notes
1st place, gold medalist(s)	Margaret Simpson	Ghana	13.54	1.81	12.81	24.38	6.02	53.33	2:21.57	6278	GR
2nd place, silver medalist(s)	Patience Okoro	Nigeria	15.12	1.72	12.86	26.08	5.51	39.30	2:38.42	5161	
3rd place, bronze medalist(s)	Béatrice Kamboulé	Burkina Faso	14.07	1.60	9.51	24.80	6.00	28.76	2:38.92	4994	
4	Nadège Essama Foe	Cameroon	15.98	1.42	13.48	25.78	4.96	28.73	2:34.88	4469	
5	Katia Amokrane	Algeria	15.55	1.57	9.64	26.53	4.40	23.00	2:21.03	4286	
6	Viviana Olaman	Equatorial Guinea	16.20	1.48	10.42	28.23	4.51	30.23	2:38.52	3961	
