= 2002 African Championships in Athletics – Women's long jump =

The women's long jump event at the 2002 African Championships in Athletics was held in Radès, Tunisia on August 8.

== Results ==
Rank	Name	Nationality	Result	Notes
1st place, gold medalist(s)	Françoise Mbango	Cameroon	6.68w	
2nd place, silver medalist(s)	Kéné Ndoye	Senegal	6.45w	
3rd place, bronze medalist(s)	Chinedu Odozor	Nigeria	6.39	
4	Mona Sabry	Egypt	5.89w	
5	Yah Koïta	Mali	5.86w	
6	Awatef Hamrouni	Tunisia	5.81	
7	Kadiatou Camara	Mali	5.71	
8	Georgina Sowah	Ghana	5.68w	
9	Monia Jelassi	Tunisia	5.35w	
10	Sihem Jelidi	Tunisia	5.33w	
11	Sarah Bouaoudia	Algeria	5.28	
12	Béatrice Kamboulé	Burkina Faso	5.25	
13	Matagari Diazasouba	Ivory Coast	5.17w	
	Joanna Hoareau	Seychelles	DNS	
	Paulette Mendy	Senegal	DNS	
