= 2002 World Junior Championships in Athletics – Women's 4 × 100 metres relay =

The women's 4×100 metres relay event at the 2002 World Junior Championships in Athletics was held in Kingston, Jamaica, at National Stadium on 20 and 21 July.

== Medalists ==
Gold	Sherone Simpson; Kerron Stewart; Anneisha McLaughlin; Simone Facey; Jamaica
Silver	Lauryn Williams; Ashlee Williams; Shalonda Solomon; Marshevet Hooker; United States
Bronze	Jade Lucas-Read; Jeanette Kwakye; Amy Spencer; Vernicha James; United Kingdom

== Results ==
=== Final ===
21 July

Rank	Nation	Competitors	Time	Notes
1st place, gold medalist(s)	Jamaica	Sherone Simpson; Kerron Stewart; Anneisha McLaughlin; Simone Facey	43.40	
2nd place, silver medalist(s)	United States	Lauryn Williams; Ashlee Williams; Shalonda Solomon; Marshevet Hooker	43.66	
3rd place, bronze medalist(s)	United Kingdom	Jade Lucas-Read; Jeanette Kwakye; Amy Spencer; Vernicha James	44.22	
4	Germany	Kathrin Walloschek; Silke Maurer; Johanna Kedzierski; Michaela Halm	45.34	
5	Finland	Siina Pylkkä; Elina Korjansalo; Carla Bosco; Anna Heiniö	45.62	
6	South Africa	Monique Balsamo; Cindy Stewart; Chantelle Terblanche; Carla Fick	46.16	
7	Switzerland	Carmen Kissling; Saskia Girsberger; Melanie Stempfel; Manuela Frei	46.33	
	France	Sandra Gomis; Natalia Losange; Narayane Dossévi; Phara Anacharsis	DQ	IAAF rule 170.14

=== Heats ===
20 July

==== Heat 1 ====
Rank	Nation	Competitors	Time	Notes
1	Jamaica	Sherone Simpson; Nadine Palmer; Kerron Stewart; Simone Facey	43.85	Q
2	United Kingdom	Jade Lucas-Read; Danielle Norville; Amy Spencer; Vernicha James	44.49	Q
3	France	Sandra Gomis; Natalia Losange; Narayane Dossévi; Phara Anacharsis	45.24	q
4	Finland	Siina Pylkkä; Elina Korjansalo; Carla Bosco; Anna Heiniö	45.63	q
5	South Africa	Monique Balsamo; Cindy Stewart; Chantelle Terblanche; Carla Fick	46.03	q
	Australia	Jacinta Boyd; Alicia Spencer; Shermin Oksuz; Kylie Bent	DQ	

==== Heat 2 ====
Rank	Nation	Competitors	Time	Notes
1	United States	Lauryn Williams; Allyson Felix; Marshevet Hooker; Shalonda Solomon	43.92	Q
2	Germany	Kathrin Walloschek; Silke Maurer; Johanna Kedzierski; Michaela Halm	45.77	Q
3	Switzerland	Carmen Kissling; Saskia Girsberger; Melanie Stempfel; Manuela Frei	45.96	q
4	Saint Kitts and Nevis	Julieta Johnson; Tiandra Ponteen; Nathandra John; Virgil Hodge	46.14	
5	Senegal	Adja Ndiaye; Fatou Diabaye; Gnima Faye; Fatoumata Coly	47.55	
	Canada	Kerri-Ann Mitchell; Oluwatoyin Olupona; Ashley Purnell; Krysia Bayley	DNF	

== Participation ==
According to an unofficial count, 51 athletes from 12 countries participated in the event.

- Australia (4)
- Canada (4)
- Finland (4)
- France (4)
- Germany (4)
- Jamaica (5)
- Saint Kitts and Nevis (4)
- Senegal (4)
- South Africa (4)
- Switzerland (4)
- United Kingdom (5)
- United States (5)
