= 2001 World Championships in Athletics – Women's heptathlon =

These are the official results of the Women's Heptathlon competition at the 2001 World Championships in Edmonton, Alberta, Canada. With 18 participating athletes, including two non-finishers and one non-starter, the competition is notable for having the lowest number of competitors in the World Championships history. The competition started on Saturday August 4, 2001 and ended on Sunday August 5, 2001. The winning margin was 155 points.

== Medalists ==
Gold	Yelena Prokhorova; Russia (RUS)
Silver	Natallia Sazanovich; Belarus (BLR)
Bronze	Shelia Burrell; United States (USA)

== Schedule ==
Saturday, August 4
1. 100 m hurdles
2. High Jump
3. Shot Put
4. 200 m

Sunday, August 5
5. Long Jump
6. Javelin Throw
7. 800 m

== Records ==
Standing records prior to the 2001 World Athletics Championships
World Record	Jackie Joyner-Kersee (USA)	7291	September 24, 1988	Seoul, South Korea
Event Record	Jackie Joyner-Kersee (USA)	7128	September 1, 1987	Rome, Italy
Season Best	Eunice Barber (FRA)	6736	May 27, 2001	Götzis, Austria

== Results ==
The highest mark recorded in each event is highlighted in yellow

Rank	Athlete	Heptathlon							Points
Rank	Athlete	1	2	3	4	5	6	7	Points
1st place, gold medalist(s)	Yelena Prokhorova (RUS)	13.77	1.88	13.15	23.73	6.61	50.73	2:11.53	6694
2nd place, silver medalist(s)	Natallia Sazanovich (BLR)	13.29	1.76	15.90	23.87	6.50	46.72	2:20.87	6539
3rd place, bronze medalist(s)	Shelia Burrell (USA)	13.05	1.67	12.87	22.92	6.45	48.74	2:14.24	6472
4	Natalya Roshchupkina (RUS)	14.12	1.79	14.74	23.41	6.02	44.04	2:15.56	6294
5	Karin Ertl (GER)	13.56	1.82	13.83	24.91	6.28	45.89	2:18.54	6283
6	Austra Skujytė (LTU)	14.37	1.79	16.06	25.52	6.00	46.04	2:20.78	6112
7	LeShundra Nathan (USA)	13.68	1.70	14.68	25.16	6.04	46.12	2:19.05	6073
8	Irina Belova (RUS)	13.86	1.73	14.12	24.66	5.86	38.73	2:07.44	6061
9	Gertrud Bacher (ITA)	13.94	1.70	14.03	25.10	5.69	45.38	2:09.85	6010
10	Tiia Hautala (FIN)	13.79	1.79	13.32	25.52	5.94	45.40	2:18.98	6002
11	Marie Collonvillé (FRA)	13.87	1.79	11.89	25.59	5.93	41.61	2:13.70	5887
12	Nicole Haynes (CAN)	14.48	1.73	14.94	26.41	5.87	46.37	2:24.45	5786
13	Margaret Simpson (GHA)	14.07	1.76	11.14	25.11	5.57	50.76	2:23.54	5748
14	Tia Hellebaut (BEL)	14.60	1.85	12.84	26.54	5.65	44.37	2:23.20	5680
15	G. Pramila Ganapathy (IND)	14.41	1.73	11.43	25.04	5.92	34.60	2:22.89	5492
—	Eunice Barber (FRA)	12.78	1.88	NM	DNS	DNS	DNS	DNS	DNF
—	Svetlana Kazanina (KAZ)	15.02	1.76	NM	25.69	5.73	DNS	DNS	DNF
—	Denise Lewis (GBR)	DNS	DNS	DNS	DNS	DNS	DNS	DNS	DNS
