= Vida Bruce =

Ghanaian sprinter

Medal record

Women's athletics

Representing Ghana

African Championships
Bronze medal – third place	2002 Radès	4×100 m

Vida Bruce is a retired Ghanaian sprinter.

She won a bronze medal in the 4 × 100 metres relay at the 2002 African Championships, and also competed in the 100 metres and the 200 metres at the same event without reaching the final. During the second TrafieCall athletics competition in 2002, Vida went unchallenged in the 100 and 200 metre races and set a new record of 12.09 seconds, beating her record of 12.14 seconds.
