= Assetou Bamba =

Ivorian sprinter

Assetou Bamba (born 1 December 1980) is a retired Ivorian sprinter who specialized in the 100 metres.

Her best placement was a fourth place in the 4 × 100 metres relay at the 2003 All-Africa Games. She also competed individually at the 2003 All-Africa Games, the 2004 African Championships (both 100 and 200 metres) and 2005 Jeux de la Francophonie without reaching the final.

Her personal best time was 12.12 seconds, achieved at the 2004 African Championships.
