= Matagari Diazasouba =

Ivorian athletics competitor

Medal record

Women's athletics

Representing Ivory Coast

African Championships
Silver medal – second place	2002 Radès	4×100 m

Matagari Diazasouba is a retired Côte d'Ivoire sprinter.

Her biggest outing was the 2003 World Championships, where she competed in the 4 x 100 metres relay without reaching the final.

She won a silver medal in the same event at the 2002 African Championships, and also finished thirteenth in the long jump there.
