= Dominique Koster =

South African sprinter (born 1977)

Medal record

Women's athletics

Representing South Africa

African Championships
Gold medal – first place	2002 Radès	4×100 m

Dominique Koster (born 3 January 1977) is a retired South African sprinter who specialized in the 400 metres.

Her biggest outing was the 2005 World Championships, where she competed on the South African 4 × 400 metres relay team. At the 2002 African Championships she finished seventh in the 200 metres and won a gold medal in the 4 × 100 metres relay.

Her personal best time was 53.97 seconds, achieved in April 2002 in Pretoria.
