= Fatoumata Coly =

Senegalese sprinter

Medal record

Women's athletics

Representing Senegal

African Championships
Bronze medal – third place	2004 Brazzaville	4×100 m

Fatoumata Coly (born 3 January 1984) is a Senegalese sprinter who specialized in the 100 metres.

She won a bronze medal in the 4 × 100 metres relay at the 2004 African Championships.

She also competed individually at the 2001 World Youth Championships, the 2003 All-Africa Games and the 2004 African Championships, in relay at the 2002 World Junior Championships without reaching the final and also in relay at the 2002 African Championships where the team was disqualified.

Her personal best time was 11.75 seconds, achieved in May 2013 in Gavardo.
