= Margaret Simpson =

Ghanaian heptathlete

Personal information
- Nationality: Ghanaian
- Born: 31 December 1981 (age 44)
- Height: 1.63 m (5 ft 4 in)
- Weight: 58 kg (128 lb)

Sport
- Country: Ghana
- Sport: Track and field
- Event: Heptathlon

Achievements and titles
- Personal best: Heptathlon 6,423 points
Medal record
Women's athletics
Representing Ghana
World Championships
Bronze medal – third place	2005 Helsinki	Heptathlon
African Championships
Gold medal – first place	2002 Tunis	Heptathlon
Gold medal – first place	2004 Brazzaville	Heptathlon
Gold medal – first place	2010 Nairobi	Heptathlon
Gold medal – first place	2012 Porto-Novo	Javelin throw
All-Africa Games
Gold medal – first place	2003 Abuja	Heptathlon
Gold medal – first place	2007 Algiers	Heptathlon
Gold medal – first place	2011 Maputo	Heptathlon
Commonwealth Games
Bronze medal – third place	2002 Manchester	Heptathlon

Margaret Simpson (born 31 December 1981) is a Ghanaian heptathlete. She won a bronze medal at the 2005 World Championships, setting several personal bests in the process. Her personal best is 6423 points, achieved in Götzis in May 2005.

== Biography ==
In one of her earliest international senior performances, she placed fourth at the 1999 All-Africa Games. She was the junior champion at the 1999 African Junior Athletics Championships, but failed to finish in the event at the 2000 World Junior Championships in Athletics. She was selected for the heptathlon at the 2001 World Championships in Athletics and placed 13th overall. Senior success came the following year as she took the bronze medal at the 2002 Commonwealth Games and then won the heptathlon gold medal at the 2002 African Championships in Athletics. She failed to finish at the 2003 World Championships in Athletics. In 2004, Simpson became African Champion for a second time and followed this result with a ninth place at the 2004 Athens Olympics.

Simpson reached the global podium for the first time at the 2005 World Championships in Athletics, taking third place with the second best performance of her career with a tally of 6375 points. She had set a personal best of 6423 points at the Hypo-Meeting earlier that season. She missed the 2006 season but returned the year after, setting an African record 7014-point score in the women's decathlon.

She followed that with a gold medal performance at the 2007 All-Africa Games. She failed to finish at the 2007 World Championships in Athletics later that season. She missed all of the 2008 season after this. She was off form in 2009 and registered a season's best of 5872 points at the Meeting International d'Arles. She was back to good form at the 2010 African Championships in Athletics, where she won a third heptathlon title in a score of 6031 points. She also managed eighth in the high jump for African at the 2010 IAAF Continental Cup.

She won the 2011 edition of the Multistars meeting in Desenzano del Garda with a score of 6270 points, defeating the 2010 champion Marina Goncharova. She was fourteenth at the 2011 World Championships in Athletics and won a third straight title at the 2011 All-Africa Games. She won the African Combined Events Championships in both 2011 and 2012.

She withdrew from the heptathlon at the 2012 Summer Olympics due to a kidney infection.

Simpson is renowned for her strong javelin throw, her personal best in which is 56.36 metres.

== Achievements ==
Year	Competition	Venue	Position	Event	Notes
Representing Ghana
1999	African Junior Championships	Tunis, Tunisia	2nd	4 × 100 m relay	47.13
1999	African Junior Championships	Tunis, Tunisia	1st	Heptathlon	5366 pts
1999	All-Africa Games	Johannesburg, South Africa	4th	Heptathlon	5089 pts
2000	World Junior Championships	Santiago, Chile	—	Heptathlon	DNF
2001	World Championships	Edmonton, Canada	13th	Heptathlon	5748 pts
2002	Commonwealth Games	Manchester, United Kingdom	3rd	Heptathlon	5906 pts
2002	African Championships	Radès, Tunisia	1st	Heptathlon	6105 pts
2003	Hypo-Meeting	Götzis, Austria	5th	Heptathlon	6120 pts
2003	World Championships	Paris, France	–	Heptathlon	DNF
2003	All-Africa Games	Abuja, Nigeria	1st	Heptathlon	6152 pts
2004	Hypo-Meeting	Götzis, Austria	5th	Heptathlon	6306 pts
2004	African Championships	Brazzaville, Republic of the Congo	1st	Heptathlon	6154 pts
2005	Hypo-Meeting	Götzis, Austria	4th	Heptathlon	6423 pts
2005	World Championships	Helsinki, Finland	3rd	Heptathlon	6375 pts
2007	All-Africa Games	Algiers, Algeria	1st	Heptathlon	6278 pts
2007	World Championships	Osaka, Japan	–	Heptathlon	DNF
2010	African Championships	Nairobi, Kenya	1st	Heptathlon	6031 pts
2011	All-Africa Games	Maputo, Mozambique	1st	Heptathlon	6172 pts
2012	African Championships	Porto-Novo, Benin	1st	Javelin throw	54.62 m
2012	African Championships	Porto-Novo, Benin	–	Heptathlon	DNF

== Competition record ==
=== 2011 World Championships ===
Event	Result	Position	Points	Overall	Notes
100 metre hurdles	13.43 secs	1st	1,060	9th	Heat 3
High jump	1.80 m	2nd	978	9th	Group B
Shot put	12.48 m	7th	693	17th	Group B
200 metres	25.23 secs	3rd	866	19th	Heat 3
Long jump	5.88 m	10th	813	22nd	Group B
Javelin	53.13 m	2nd	921	14th	Group A
800 metres	2:17.91	8th	852	14th	Heat 2
Heptathlon			6,183	14th	Source:IAAF
