= Patience Okoro =

Nigerian heptathlete

Personal information
- Nationality: Nigerian
- Born: 10 July 1984 (age 41)
- Height: 1.63 m (5 ft 4 in)
- Weight: 58 kg (128 lb)

Sport
- Country: Nigeria
- Sport: Track and field
- Event: Heptathlon
Medal record
Women's athletics
Representing Nigeria
All-Africa Games
Bronze medal – third place	2003 Abuja	Heptathlon
Silver medal – second place	2007 Algiers	Heptathlon
African Championships
Gold medal – first place	2008 Addis Ababa	Heptathlon

Patience Okoro (born 10 July 1984) is a Nigerian heptathlete. She won a gold medal in heptathlon at the 2008 African Championships in Athletics held in Addis Ababa, Ethiopia.

== Career ==
In one of her earliest international senior performances, she started during the 2003 All-Africa Games in Abuja, Nigeria where she won her first international bronze medal. She later placed fifth at the 2006 Africa Championships in Athletics and fourth at the 2011 All-Africa Games competitions. Okoro also won silver medal at the 2007 All-Africa Games and a bronze medal during the 2003 events.

== Achievements ==
=== African Championships ===
Year	Competition	Venue	Position	Event	Notes
Representing Nigeria
2008	African Athletics Championships	Addis Ababa, Ethiopia	1st	heptathlon	47

=== All African Games ===
Year	Competition	Venue	Position	Event	Notes	
Representing Nigeria
2007	All-Africa Games	Algiers, Algeria	2nd	Heptathlon	5161 pts	
2011	All-Africa Games	Abuja, Nigeria	3rd	Heptathlon	5436 pts	–

Year	Competition	Venue	Position	Event	Notes
Representing Nigeria
2003	Athletics at the 2003 Afro-Asian Games	Hyderabad India	Women's heptathlon	DNF	
