= Yah Soucko Koïta =

Malian athlete specialized in the long jump

Medal record

Women's athletics

Representing Mali

African Championships
Bronze medal – third place	2004 Brazzaville	Long jump

Yah Soucko Koïta (born 23 September 1980) is a Malian athlete who specialized in the long jump. She notably won two bronze medals in African continental competition, as well as competing at three World Championships.

== Jumps ==
She won the gold medals at the 1999 West African Championships and the 1999 African Junior Championships, finished sixth at the 2001 Jeux de la Francophonie, fifth at the 2002 African Championships, sixth at the 2003 All-Africa Games, won the bronze medal at the 2004 African Championships, the gold medal at the 2005 West African Championships, finished fourth at the 2005 Jeux de la Francophonie, fourth at the 2006 African Championships, won the bronze medal at the 2007 All-Africa Games, finished fourth at the 2008 African Championships, fifth at the 2009 Jeux de la Francophonie, fourth at the 2010 African Championships, and ninth at the 2017 Jeux de la Francophonie.

In the triple jump she finished fourth at the 2005 Jeux de la Francophonie, eighth at the 2006 African Championships and eighth at the 2006 African Championships.

== Sprints ==
She competed in the 100 metres at the 1999 World Championships, the 2002 African Championships, the 2004 African Championships, the 2005 World Championships, the 2009 World Championships, the 2010 African Championships and the 2017 Jeux de la Francophonie without reaching the final.

In the 200 metres, she won the bronze medal at the 2005 West African Championships and competed at the 2007 Summer Universiade without reaching the final.

Her personal best time in the 100 metres was 11.81 seconds, achieved in April 2009 in Ouagadougou, having also ran 11.5 seconds in hand timing. Her personal best long jump was 6.35 metres, achieved in July 2003 in Narbonne. Her personal best triple jump of 12.94 metres, achieved at the 2005 Jeux de la Francophonie in Niamey was a Malian record. She represented the club Stade Malien.
