= Athletics at the 2003 All-Africa Games =

Athletics at the VIII All-Africa Games
- Dates: 11–16 October
- Host city: Abuja, Nigeria
- Venue: Abuja Stadium
- Events: 46
- Participation: 465 athletes from 47 nations

The athletics competition at the 2003 All-Africa Games was held at the Abuja Stadium between 11 and 16 October 2003. The host nation, Nigeria, topped the medal table.

== Men's results ==
=== Track ===
| Event | Gold | | Silver | | Bronze | |
|---|---|---|---|---|---|---|
| 100 m | Deji Aliu; Nigeria | 9.95 GR | Uchenna Emedolu; Nigeria | 9.97 | Leonard Myles-Mills; Ghana | 10.03 |
| 200 m | Uchenna Emedolu; Nigeria | 20.42 | Frankie Fredericks; Namibia | 20.43 | Abdul Aziz Zakari; Ghana | 20.51 |
| 400 m | Ezra Sambu; Kenya | 44.98 | Nagmeldin Ali Abubakr; Sudan | 45.22 | Sofiène Labidi; Tunisia | 45.42 |
| 800 m | Samwel Mwera; Tanzania | 1:46.13 | Mbulaeni Mulaudzi; South Africa | 1:46.44 | Justus Koech; Kenya | 1:46.50 |
| 1500 m | Paul Korir; Kenya | 3:37.52 | Robert Rono; Kenya | 3:38.13 | Benjamin Kipkurui; Kenya | 3:38.94 |
| 5000 m | Kenenisa Bekele; Ethiopia | 13:26.16 GR | Hailu Mekonnen; Ethiopia | 13:26.73 | John Kibowen; Kenya | 13:29.14 |
| 10,000 m | Sileshi Sihine; Ethiopia | 27:42.13 | Gebregziabher Gebremariam; Ethiopia | 27:43.12 | Dejene Berhanu; Ethiopia | 27:47.19 |
| Marathon | Johannes Kekana; South Africa | 2:25:01 | Gashaw Melese; Ethiopia | 2:26:08 | Gudisa Shentema; Ethiopia | 2:27:39 |
| 3000 m St. | Ezekiel Kemboi; Kenya | 8:12.27 GR | Paul Kipsiele Koech; Kenya | 8:14.77 | Tewodros Shiferaw; Ethiopia | 8:27.33 |
| 110 m H | Joseph-Berlioz Randriamihaja; Madagascar | 13.77 | Todd Matthews Jouda; Sudan | 13.81 | Frikkie van Zyl; South Africa | 13.94 |
| 400 m H | Osita Okeagu; Nigeria | 50.25 | Victor Okorie; Nigeria | 50.36 | Ibou Faye; Senegal | 50.89 |
| 20 km walk | Hatem Ghoula; Tunisia | 1:30:32 | Moussa Aouanouk; Algeria | 1:30:36 | Arezki Yahiaoui; Algeria | 1:35:19 |
| 4 X 100 m | Ghana; Christian Nsiah; Eric Nkansah; Aziz Zakari; Leonard Myles-Mills | 38.63 | Nigeria; Aaron Egbele; Tamunosiki Atodirubo; Deji Musa; Deji Aliu | 38.70 | Senegal; Oumar Loum; Doudou Felou Sow; Gora Diop; Abdou Demba Lam | 39.79 |
| 4 X 400 m | Botswana; California Molefe; Kagiso Kilego; Oganeditse Moseki; Johnson Kubisa | 3:02.24 NR | Nigeria; Abayomi Agunbiade; James Godday; Bolaji LawaAudul; Musa Audu | 3:04.49 | Zimbabwe; Crispen Mutakanyi; Godwin Tauya; Temba Ncube; Young Talkmore Nyongani | 3:05.62 |
WR world record | AR area record | CR championship record | GR games record | NR national record | OR Olympic record | PB personal best | SB season best | WL world leading (in a given season)

=== Field ===
| Event | Gold | | Silver | | Bronze | |
|---|---|---|---|---|---|---|
| High jump | Kabelo Mmono; Botswana | 2.15 | Jude Sidonie; Seychelles | 2.10 | Samson Idiata; Nigeria | 2.10 |
| Pole vault | Béchir Zaghouani; Tunisia | 5.20 | Fanie Jacobs; South Africa | 5.20 | Karim Sène; Senegal | 5.00 |
| Long jump | Ignisious Gaisah; Ghana | 8.30 | Ndiss Kaba Badji; Senegal | 7.92 | Khotso Mokoena; South Africa | 7.83 |
| Triple jump | Andrew Owusu; Ghana | 16.41 | Khotso Mokoena; South Africa | 16.28 | Olivier Sanou; Burkina Faso | 16.21 |
| Shot put | Burger Lambrechts; South Africa | 18.87 | Chima Ugwu; Nigeria | 18.66 | Yasser Ibrahim Farag; Egypt | 17.96 |
| Discus | Omar Ahmed El Ghazali; Egypt | 63.61 GR | Hannes Hopley; South Africa | 62.86 | Johannes van Wyk; South Africa | 62.43 |
| Hammer | Chris Harmse; South Africa | 75.17 | Saber Souid; Tunisia | 70.81 | Samir Haouam; Algeria | 68.95 |
| Javelin | Gerhardus Pienaar; South Africa | 76.95 | Walid Abderrazak Mohamed; Egypt | 73.79 | Brian Erasmus; South Africa | 72.94 |
| Decathlon | Mustafa Taha Hussein; Egypt | 7400 points | Lee Okoroafor; Nigeria | 7240 points | Rédouane Youcef; Algeria | 7119 points |
WR world record | AR area record | CR championship record | GR games record | NR national record | OR Olympic record | PB personal best | SB season best | WL world leading (in a given season)

== Women results ==
=== Track ===
| Event | Gold | | Silver | | Bronze | |
|---|---|---|---|---|---|---|
| 100 m | Mary Onyali; Nigeria | 11.26 | Endurance Ojokolo; Nigeria | 11.26 | Vida Anim; Ghana | 11.29 |
| 100 m | Wind: +0.2 | | | | | |
| 200 m | Mary Onyali; Nigeria | 23.09 | Vida Anim; Ghana | 23.17 | Estie Wittstock; South Africa | 23.46 |
| 200 m | Wind: +2.2 | | | | | |
| 400 m | Fatou Bintou Fall; Senegal | 51.38 | Doris Jacob; Nigeria | 51.41 | Mireille Nguimgo; Cameroon | 51.59 |
| 800 m | Grace Ebor; Nigeria | 2:02.04 | Akosua Serwah; Ghana | 2:02.40 | Lwiza John; Tanzania | 2:02.85 |
| 1500 m | Kutre Dulecha; Ethiopia | 4:21.63 | Jackline Maranga; Kenya | 4:22.69 | Naomi Mugo; Kenya | 4:24.33 |
| 5000 m | Meseret Defar; Ethiopia | 16:42.0 | Dorcus Inzikuru; Uganda | 16:42.9 | Isabella Ochichi; Kenya | 16:43.4 |
| 10 000 m | Ejegayehu Dibaba; Ethiopia | 32:34.54 | Werknesh Kidane; Ethiopia | 32:37.35 | Leah Malot; Kenya | 32:56.43 |
| Marathon | Clarisse Rasoarizay; Madagascar | 2:46:58 | Tadelesh Birra; Ethiopia | 2:52:04 | Leila Aman; Ethiopia | 2:55:07 |
| 100 m H | Angela Atede; Nigeria | 13.01 | Damaris Agbugba; Nigeria | 13.06 | Christy Akinremi; Nigeria | 13.55 |
| 100 m H | Wind: +2.5 | | | | | |
| 400 m H | Omolade Akinremi; Nigeria | 56.98 | Kate Obilor; Nigeria | 57.53 | Carole Kaboud Mebam; Cameroon | 58.28 |
| 20 km walk | Estlé Viljoen; South Africa | 1:44:29 | Amsale Yakobe; Ethiopia | 1:47:42 | Natalie Fourie; South Africa | 1:48:08 |
| 4 X 100 m | Nigeria; Emem Edem; Endurance Ojokolo; Chinedu Odozor; Mary Onyali-Omagbemi | 43.04 GR | South Africa; Dikeledi Moropane; Heide Seyerling; Geraldine Pillay; Kerryn Hulsen | 44.44 | Senegal; Aissatou Badji; Fatou Bintou Fall; Aminata Diouf; Aida Diop | 45.42 |
| 4 X 400 m | Nigeria; Bisi Afolabi; Glory Nwosu; Doris Jacob; Rosemary Onochie | 3:27.76 | Cameroon; Hortense Bewouda; Carole Kaboud Mebam; Mireille Nguimgo; Muriel Noah Ahanda | 3:31.52 | (only 2 teams started) | |
WR world record | AR area record | CR championship record | GR games record | NR national record | OR Olympic record | PB personal best | SB season best | WL world leading (in a given season)

=== Field ===
| Event | Gold | | Silver | | Bronze | |
|---|---|---|---|---|---|---|
| High jump | Nneka Ukuh; Nigeria | 1.84 | Marizca Gertenbach; South Africa | 1.84 | Anika Smit; South Africa | 1.80 |
| Pole vault | Samantha Dodd; South Africa | 3.90 GR | Annelie van Wyk; South Africa | 3.80 | Margaretha du Plessis; South Africa | 3.50 |
| Long jump | Esther Aghatise; Nigeria | 6.58 | Grace Umelo; Nigeria | 6.56 | Chinedu Odozor; Nigeria | 6.52 |
| Triple jump | Kéné Ndoye; Senegal | 14.23 | Salamatu Alimi; Nigeria | 13.47 | Nkechinyere Mbaoma; Nigeria | 13.18 |
| Shot put | Vivian Chukwuemeka; Nigeria | 18.12 GR | Veronica Abrahamse; South Africa | 15.77 | Wafa Ismail El Baghdadi; Egypt | 15.32 |
| Discus | Elizna Naudé; South Africa | 57.44 | Vivian Chukwuemeka; Nigeria | 54.83 | Alifatou Djibril; Togo | 54.79 |
| Hammer | Marwa Hussein Arafat; Egypt | 64.28 | Susan Adeoye Olufunke; Nigeria | 58.86 | Vivian Chukwuemeka; Nigeria | 56.54 |
| Javelin | Aïda Sellam; Tunisia | 54.58 | Lindy Leveaux; Seychelles | 53.23 | Sunette Viljoen; South Africa | 51.68 |
| Heptathlon | Margaret Simpson; Ghana | 6152 points GR | Justine Robbeson; South Africa | 5697 points | Patience Okoro; Nigeria | 5436 points |
WR world record | AR area record | CR championship record | GR games record | NR national record | OR Olympic record | PB personal best | SB season best | WL world leading (in a given season)

== Medal table ==
| Rank | Nation | Gold | Silver | Bronze | Total |
|---|---|---|---|---|---|
| 1 | Nigeria (NGR) | 13 | 14 | 6 | 33 |
| 2 | South Africa (SAF) | 7 | 9 | 9 | 25 |
| 3 | Ethiopia (ETH) | 5 | 6 | 4 | 15 |
| 4 | Ghana (GHA) | 4 | 2 | 3 | 9 |
| 5 | Kenya (KEN) | 3 | 3 | 6 | 12 |
| 6 | Egypt (EGY) | 3 | 1 | 2 | 6 |
| 7 | Tunisia (TUN) | 3 | 1 | 1 | 5 |
| 8 | Senegal (SEN) | 2 | 1 | 4 | 7 |
| 9 | Botswana (BOT) | 2 | 0 | 0 | 2 |
| 9 | Madagascar (MAD) | 2 | 0 | 0 | 2 |
| 11 | Tanzania (TAN) | 1 | 0 | 1 | 2 |
| 12 | Seychelles (SEY) | 0 | 2 | 0 | 2 |
| 12 | Sudan (SUD) | 0 | 2 | 0 | 2 |
| 14 | Algeria (ALG) | 0 | 1 | 3 | 4 |
| 15 | Cameroon (CMR) | 0 | 1 | 2 | 3 |
| 16 | Namibia (NAM) | 0 | 1 | 0 | 1 |
| 16 | Uganda (UGA) | 0 | 1 | 0 | 1 |
| 18 | Burkina Faso (BUR) | 0 | 0 | 1 | 1 |
| 18 | Togo (TOG) | 0 | 0 | 1 | 1 |
| 18 | Zimbabwe (ZIM) | 0 | 0 | 1 | 1 |
| Totals (20 entries) | | 45 | 45 | 44 | 134 |

== Participating nations ==
- Algeria (18)
- Angola (2)
- Benin (11)
- Botswana (11)
- Burkina Faso (10)
- Burundi (4)
- Cameroon (10)
- Cape Verde (4)
- Central African Republic (2)
- Chad (3)
- Comoros (1)
- Democratic Republic of the Congo (4)
- Egypt (11)
- Eritrea (8)
- Ethiopia (36)
- Gambia (7)
- Ghana (14)
- Guinea (2)
- Guinea-Bissau (1)
- Ivory Coast (9)
- Kenya (29)
- Liberia (8)
- Libya (4)
- Lesotho (1)
- Madagascar (5)
- Malawi (7)
- Mali (9)
- Mauritania (2)
- Mauritius (7)
- Mozambique (3)
- Namibia (5)
- Niger (2)
- Nigeria (67)
- Republic of the Congo (11)
- Rwanda (6)
- São Tomé and Príncipe (4)
- Senegal (22)
- Seychelles (5)
- Sierra Leone (14)
- South Africa (40)
- Sudan (9)
- Tanzania (5)
- Togo (4)
- Tunisia (8)
- Uganda (7)
- Zambia (1)
- Zimbabwe (12)
