= Chinedu Odozor-Onikeku =

Nigerian long jumper

Medal record

Women's athletics

Representing Nigeria

African Championships
Silver medal – second place	1998 Dakar	Long jump
Bronze medal – third place	2002 Radès	100 m
Bronze medal – third place	2002 Radès	Long jump

Chinedu Odozor (born 24 December 1977) is a Nigerian long jumper.

Her personal best jump is 6.52 metres, which she first achieved in June 2002 in Lagos.

== Achievements ==
- 2006 African Championships - fifth place
- 2003 All-Africa Games - bronze medal
- 2002 African Championships - bronze medal
- 2002 African Championships - bronze medal (100 metres)
- 1998 African Championships - silver medal
