= Aissatou Badji =

Senegalese sprinter

Medal record

Women's athletics

Representing Senegal

All-Africa Games
Bronze medal – third place	2003 Abuja	4 × 100 metres relay

African Championships
Bronze medal – third place	2004 Brazzaville	4 × 100 metres relay

Aissatou Badji (born 26 December 1980) is a retired Senegalese sprinter who specialized in the 100 metres.

She won a bronze medal in the 4 × 100 metres relay at the 2003 All-Africa Games and at the 2004 African Championships. She also competed individually in the 100 metres at the 2002 African Championships, the 2003 All-Africa Games and the 2004 African Championships without reaching the final.

Her personal best time was 11.95 seconds, achieved in June 2012 in Cagnes.
