= Kerryn Hulsen =

South African hurdler

Medal record

Women's athletics

Representing South Africa

All-Africa Games
Silver medal – second place	2003 Abuja	4 × 100 metres relay

Kerryn (van Zyl) Hulsen (born 5 October 1974) is a retired South African hurdler who specialized in the 400 metres hurdles.

In the hurdles she competed at the 2001 Summer Universiade without reaching the final, and finished fifth at the 2003 All-Africa Games. At the same games she won a silver medal in the 4 × 100 metres relay.

Her personal best time was 56.19 seconds, achieved in April 2002 in Germiston.
