= Makaridja Sanganoko =

Ivorian sprinter

Medal record

Women's athletics

Representing Ivory Coast

African Championships
Silver medal – second place	2002 Radès	4×100 m

Makaridja Sanganoko (born 8 May 1980) is a Côte d'Ivoire sprinter who specializes in the 100 and 200 metres.

She competed at the 2003 World Championships and the 2003 World Indoor Championships, without reaching the final round.

In the 4 x 100 metres relay she won a bronze medal at the 2002 IAAF World Cup and competed at the 2000 Olympic Games.

== Personal bests ==
- 60 metres - 7.39 s (2002, indoor)
- 100 metres - 11.17 s (2002)
- 200 metres - 23.15 s (2002)
- 4 x 100 metres relay - 43.89 s (2001) - national record.
