= Endurance Ojokolo =

Nigerian sprinter

Medal record

Women's athletics

Representing Nigeria

African Championships
Gold medal – first place	1998 Dakar	4×100 m
Gold medal – first place	2002 Radès	100 m
Gold medal – first place	2004 Brazzaville	100 m
Gold medal – first place	2004 Brazzaville	4×100 m
Gold medal – first place	2008 Addis Ababa	4×100 m
Silver medal – second place	1998 Dakar	100 m
Silver medal – second place	2006 Bambous	4×100 m
Bronze medal – third place	2006 Bambous	100 m

Endurance Ojokolo (born 29 September 1975 in London) is a Nigerian former athlete who specialized in the 100 metres.

== Achievements ==
Year	Competition	Venue	Position	Event	Notes
Representing Nigeria
1994	World Junior Championships	Lisbon, Portugal	17th (qf)	100m	11.81 w (wind: +2.4 m/s)
1994	World Junior Championships	Lisbon, Portugal	20th (q)	Long jump	5.64 m (wind: +0.8 m/s)
1994	World Junior Championships	Lisbon, Portugal	14th (h)	4 × 400 m relay	3:49.16
1997	World Indoor Championships	Paris, France	5th	60 m	7.38
1997	World Championships	Athens, Greece	29th (qf)	100 m	11.53
1997	World Championships	Athens, Greece	7th	4 × 100 m relay	43.27
1998	African Championships	Dakar, Senegal	2nd	100 m	11.08
1998	African Championships	Dakar, Senegal	1st	4 × 100 m relay	43.75
1998	World Cup	Johannesburg, South Africa	4th	4 × 100 m relay	42.91
1999	World Indoor Championships	Maebashi, Japan	7th	60 m	7.19
1999	World Championships	Seville, Spain	13th (qf)	100 m	11.14
1999	World Championships	Seville, Spain	– (h)	4 × 100 m relay	DQ
1999	All-Africa Games	Johannesburg, South Africa	3rd	100 m	11.25
1999	All-Africa Games	Johannesburg, South Africa	1st	4 × 100 m relay	43.28
2001	World Indoor Championships	Lisbon, Portugal	8th	60 m	7.23
2001	World Championships	Edmonton, Canada	6th (sf)	100 m	11.20
2001	World Championships	Edmonton, Canada	4th	4 × 100 m relay	42.52
2002	African Championships	Radès, Tunisia	1st	100 m	11.15 (w)
2002	World Cup	Madrid, Spain	3rd	100 m	11.26
2002	World Cup	Madrid, Spain	2nd	4 × 100 m relay	42.99
2003	World Championships	Paris, France	25th (qf)	100 m	11.55
2003	All-Africa Games	Abuja, Nigeria	2nd	100 m	11.26
2003	All-Africa Games	Abuja, Nigeria	1st	4 × 100 m relay	43.04
2003	Afro-Asian Games	Hyderabad, India	1st	100 m	11.45
2004	World Indoor Championships	Budapest, Hungary	25th (h)	60 m	7.44
2004	African Championships	Brazzaville, Republic of the Congo	1st	100 m	11.33
2004	African Championships	Brazzaville, Republic of the Congo	1st	4 × 100 m relay	44.32
2004	Olympic Games	Athens, Greece	18th (qf)	100 m	11.35
2004	Olympic Games	Athens, Greece	7th	4 × 100 m relay	43.42
2005	World Championships	Helsinki, Finland	16th (sf)	100 m	11.60
2005	World Championships	Helsinki, Finland	7th	4 × 100 m relay	43.25
2006	World Indoor Championships	Moscow, Russia	21st (sf)	60 m	7.53
2006	Commonwealth Games	Melbourne, Australia	16th (sf)	100 m	11.61
2006	Commonwealth Games	Melbourne, Australia	4th	4 × 100 m relay	44.37
2006	African Championships	Bambous, Mauritius	3rd	100 m	11.95
2006	African Championships	Bambous, Mauritius	2nd	4 × 100 m relay	44.52
2006	World Cup	Athens, Greece	3rd	4 × 100 m relay	43.61
2007	All-Africa Games	Algiers, Algeria	2nd	4 × 100 m relay	43.85
2007	World Championships	Osaka, Japan	11th (h)	4 × 100 m relay	43.58
2008	African Championships	Addis Ababa, Ethiopia	1st	4 × 100 m relay	43.79

=== Personal bests ===
- 60 metres – 7.08 s (1999, indoor)
- 100 metres – 11.06 s (2001)
- 200 metres – 23.09 s (1999)
