= Dikeledi Moropane =

South African sprinter (born 1976)

Medal record

Women's athletics

Representing South Africa

All-Africa Games
Silver medal – second place	2003 Abuja	4×100 m

African Championships
Gold medal – first place	2002 Radès	4×100 m
Silver medal – second place	2004 Brazzaville	4×100 m

Dikeledi Moropane (born 12 March 1976) is a retired South African sprinter who specialized in the 400 metres.

Her biggest outing was the 2001 World Championships, where she competed in the 100 metres without reaching the final.

At the 1999 All-Africa Games she competed in the 100 metres, and the South African team finished fourth in the 4 × 100 metres relay. At the 2003 All-Africa Games she competed in the 100 metres and won a silver medal in the 4 × 100 metres relay. At the 2004 African Championships she competed in the 100 metres and won a silver medal in the 4 × 100 metres relay.

Her personal best time was 11.38 seconds, achieved in February 2000 in Pretoria.
