= Mercy Nku =

Nigerian sprinter

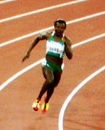
- Mercy Nku (2000)

Medal record

Women's athletics

Representing Nigeria

African Championships
Gold medal – first place	2004 Brazzaville	4×100 m
Silver medal – second place	2004 Brazzaville	100 m

Mercy Akpanchang Nku Esimoneze (born 17 July 1976 in Boki) is a retired Nigerian sprinter who specialized in the 100 metres.

== Achievements ==
Year	Competition	Venue	Position	Event	Notes
Representing Nigeria
1994	World Junior Championships	Lisbon, Portugal	12th (sf)	100m	11.77 (wind: +0.8 m/s)
1994	World Junior Championships	Lisbon, Portugal	35th (h)	200m	24.97 (wind: +1.0 m/s)
1994	World Junior Championships	Lisbon, Portugal	14th (h)	4 × 400 m relay	3:49.16
1999	World Championships	Seville, Spain	8th	100 m	11.16
1999	All-Africa Games	Johannesburg, South Africa	1st	100 m	11.03 PB CR
2000	Olympic Games	Sydney, Australia	7th	4 × 100 m relay	44.05
2001	World Indoor Championships	Lisbon, Portugal	5th	60 m	7.15
2001	World Championships	Edmonton, Canada	6th	100 m	11.17
2004	Olympic Games	Athens, Greece	7th	4 × 100 m relay	43.42
2004	African Championships	Brazzaville, Congo	2nd	100 m	11.36
2005	World Championships	Helsinki, Finland	7th	4 × 100 m relay	43.25

=== Personal bests ===
- 100 metres - 11.03 s (1999)
- 200 metres - 22.53 s (1999)
