= Christine Harrison-Bloomfield =

British athlete

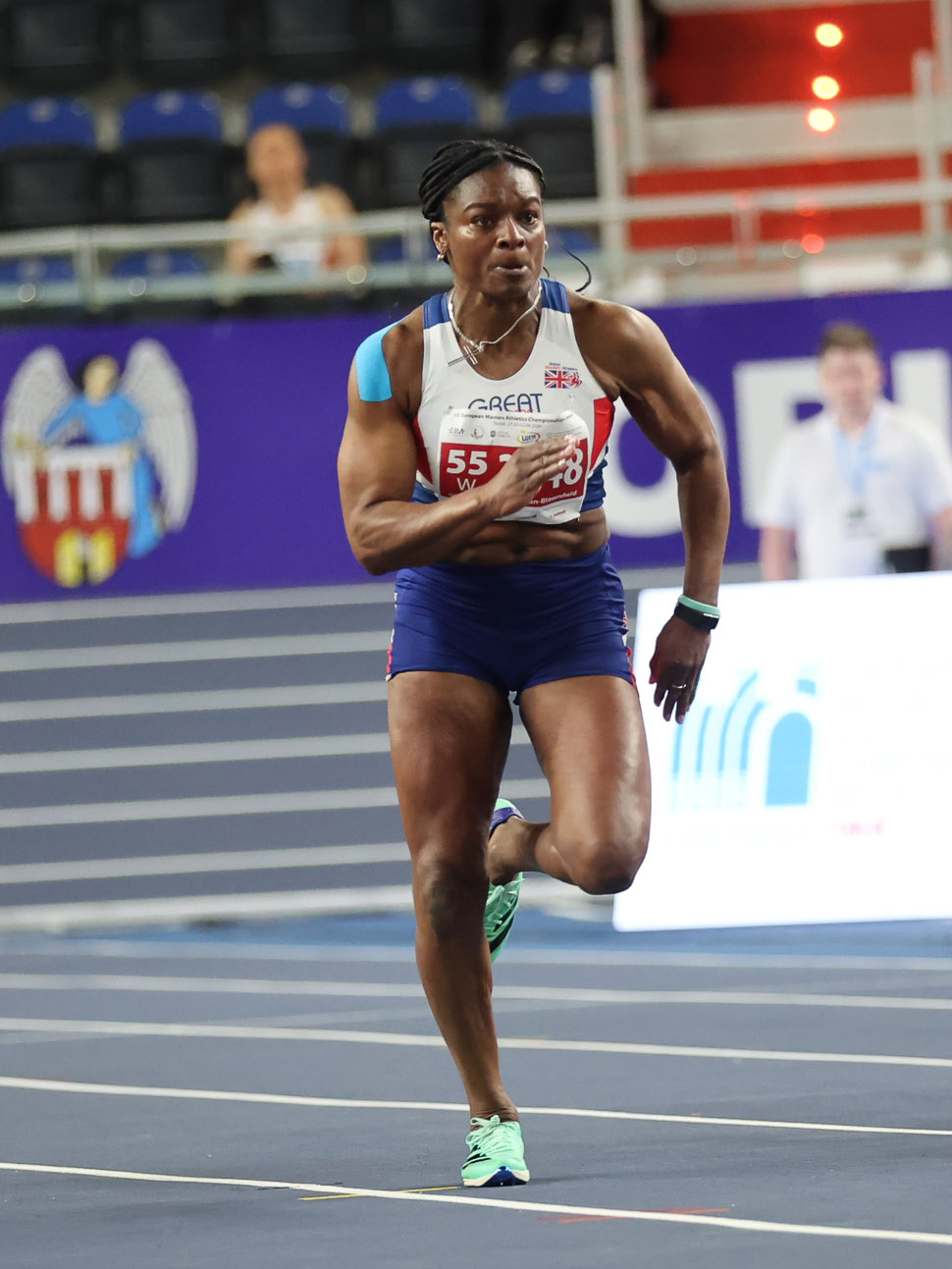
- Christine Harrison-Bloomfield (2026)

Personal information
- Nationality: British (English)
- Born: 12 February 1968 (age 58) London, England

Sport
- Sport: Athletics
- Event: Sprints
- Club: Essex Ladies AC
Medal record
Representing Great Britain
Summer Universiade
Silver medal – second place	1991 Sheffield	4x100 m relay

Christine Beverley Harrison-Bloomfield (born 12 February 1968) is a former athlete from England, who specialised in 100m and 200m.

== Biography ==
Harrison went to Peckham Girls School and studied at Greenwich University. Bloomfield finished second in both the 100 metres and 200 metres events (behind Joice Maduaka) at the 1999 AAA Championships.

Bloomfield competed in the track events of 100m and 200m races at the 1999 World Championships in Athletics which were held in Seville. She has also competed in the pole vault during her career.

== Coaching ==
As of 2020, she is an athletics coach and has worked with Christine Ohuruogu, Asha Philip and Jodie Williams. She has also worked with Laviai Nielsen.

In January 2021, she was named by UK Sport as a coach in a new leadership program to increase female representation in sport. In the program 27 coaches across 15 sports are aiming to increase female representation for the 2024 Paris Olympic and Paralympic games.
