= Aïda Diop =

Senegalese sprinter (born 1970)

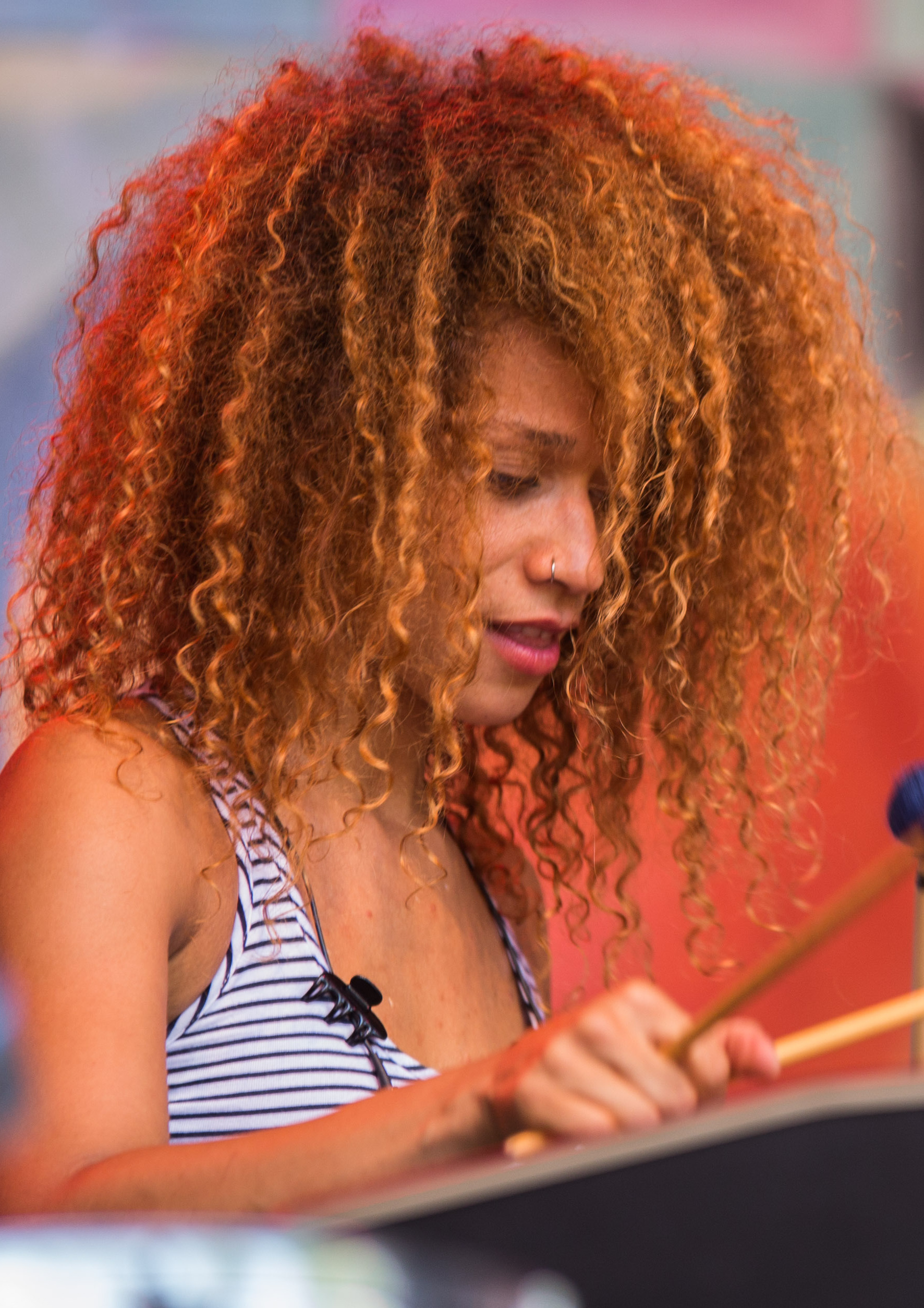
- Diop in 2015

Personal information
- Born: 27 April 1970 (age 56)

Sport
- Sport: Track and field
Medal record
Representing Senegal
African Championships
Gold medal – first place	2004 Brazzaville	4×400 m
Silver medal – second place	2000 Algiers	100 m
Silver medal – second place	2000 Algiers	200 m
Silver medal – second place	2000 Algiers	4×100 m
Silver medal – second place	2002 Radès	200 m
Bronze medal – third place	1988 Annaba	4×100 m
Bronze medal – third place	2004 Brazzaville	4×100 m

Aïda Diop (born 27 April 1970) is a Senegalese sprinter who specializes in 100 and 200 metres.

At the 2000 African Championships in Algiers she won silver medals in both 100 and 200 metres. She followed up at the 2002 African Championships in Radès with another silver medal in 200 m. She won bronze medals at the Jeux de la Francophonie in 1997 and 2001.

She competed at the World Championships in 1997, 1999 and 2001 as well as the 2000 Summer Olympics without reaching the finals. She has also competed in 4 x 400 metres relay at the World Championships and the Olympics.

== Personal bests ==
- 100 metres - 11.26 s (2002)
- 200 metres - 22.64 s (2000)
