= Emem Edem =

Nigerian sprinter

Medal record

Women's athletics

Representing Nigeria

All-Africa Games
Gold medal – first place	2003 Abuja	4 × 100 metres relay

Emem Edem (born 15 October 1983) is a retired Nigerian sprinter who specialized in the 100 metres.

She finished fifth in the 100 metres at the 1999 World Youth Championships, and also competed in the 200 metres there. On the regional scene she finished sixth in the 100 metres and won a gold medal in the 4 × 100 metres relay at the 2003 All-Africa Games.
