= 2004 African Championships in Athletics =

2004 African Championships
- Dates: 14–18 July
- Host city: Brazzaville, Republic of Congo (Republic of the Congo)
- Venue: Stade Alphonse Massemba-Débat
- Events: 44

The 14th African Championships in Athletics were held in Brazzaville, Republic of Congo in July, 2004. Since African Championships is a biennial event, this edition was contested only a month before 2004 Summer Olympics. Thus some top athletes shunned the event. On the other hand, many athletes use the competition to prepare for the Olympics.

== Medal summary ==
=== Men ===
Event	Gold		Silver		Bronze	
100 m	Olusoji Fasuba; Nigeria	10.21	Idrissa Sanou; Burkina Faso	10.37	Jaysuma Saidy; Gambia	10.43
200 m	Joseph Batangdon; Cameroon	20.46	Ambrose Ezenwa; Nigeria	20.75	Morné Nagel; South Africa	20.83
400 m	Eric Milazar; Mauritius	45.03	Ezra Sambu; Kenya	45.33	Young Talkmore Nyongani; Zimbabwe	45.69
800 m	William Yiampoy; Kenya	1:45.36	Hezekiél Sepeng; South Africa	1:45.55	Ismail Ahmed Ismail; Sudan	1:45.87
1500 m	Paul Korir; Kenya	3:39.48	Peter Roko Ashak; Sudan	3:41.31	Yassine Bensghir; Morocco	3:41.49
5000 m	Zwedo Maregu; Ethiopia	13:47.77	Boniface Songok; Kenya	13:48.06	Hillary Chenonge; Kenya	13:48.44
10,000 m	Charles Kamathi; Kenya	28:07.83	Abebe Dinkesa; Ethiopia	28:10.49	Yebeltal Admasu; Ethiopia	28:28.59
3000 m s'chase	David Chemweno; Kenya	8:17.31	Richard Matelong; Kenya	8:26.34	Abdelatif Chemlal; Morocco	8:31.01
110 m hurdles	Todd Matthews Jouda; Sudan	13.70	Shaun Bownes; South Africa	13.80	Frikkie van Zyl; South Africa	13.81
400 m hurdles	Llewellyn Herbert; South Africa	48.90	Julius Bungei; Kenya	49.56	Ockert Cilliers; South Africa	49.58
20 km walk	Julius Sawe; Kenya	1:27:43	Hassanine Sebei; Tunisia	1:28:35	Moussa Aouanouk; Algeria	1:29:02
4 × 100 m relay	Nigeria; Olusoji Fasuba; Ambrose Ezenwa; Aaron Egbele; Chinedu Oriala	38.91	South Africa; Morne Nagel; Deon du Toit; Clinton Venter; Lee-Roy Newton	39.59	Cameroon; Emmanuel Ngom Priso; Idrissa Adam; Alain Olivier Nyounai; Joseph Batangdon	39.87
4 × 400 m relay	Zimbabwe; Lloyd Zvasiya; Lewis Banda; Temba Ncube; Talkmore Nyongani	3:02.38	Nigeria; James Godday; Saul Weigopwa; Bola Lawal; Enefiok Udo-Obong	3:02.66	South Africa; Marcus La Grange; Werner Botha; Hendrick Mokganyetsi; Arnaud Malherbe	3:03.81
High jump	Kabelo Mmono; Botswana	2.17	Boubacar Séré; Burkina Faso	2.10	Khemraj Naiko; Mauritius	2.10
Pole vault	Béchir Zaghouani; Tunisia	5.20	Karim Sène; Senegal	5.00	Mohamed Karbib; Morocco	4.60
Long jump	Jonathan Chimier; Mauritius	8.06	Ndiss Kaba Badji; Senegal	7.86	Nabil Adamou; Algeria	7.72
Triple jump	Olivier Sanou; Burkina Faso	16.31	Hamza Ménina; Algeria	16.02	Thierry Adanabou; Burkina Faso	15.93
Shot put	Janus Robberts; South Africa	21.02	Burger Lambrechts; South Africa	18.78	Yasser Ibrahim Farag; Egypt	18.51
Discus throw	Frantz Kruger; South Africa	63.85	Hannes Hopley; South Africa	63.50	Nabil Kiram; Morocco	52.12
Hammer throw	Chris Harmse; South Africa	75.90	Saber Souid; Tunisia	70.71	Ahmed Abd El Raouf; Egypt	67.87
Javelin throw	Gerhardus Pienaar; South Africa	78.31	Gerbrandt Grobler; South Africa	76.93	Willie Human; South Africa	71.48
Decathlon	Anis Riahi; Tunisia	7200 points	Selwyn Lieutier; Mauritius	6882 points	Celestin Moussambote Kengué; Congo	6478 points
WR world record | AR area record | CR championship record | GR games record | NR national record | OR Olympic record | PB personal best | SB season best | WL world leading (in a given season)

=== Women ===
Event	Gold		Silver		Bronze	
100 m	Endurance Ojokolo; Nigeria	11.33	Mercy Nku; Nigeria	11.36	Geraldine Pillay; South Africa	11.40
200 m	Geraldine Pillay; South Africa	23.18	Kadiatou Camara; Mali	23.22	Nadjina Kaltouma; Chad	23.29
400 m	Fatou Bintou Fall; Senegal	50.62	Nadjina Kaltouma; Chad	50.80	Hortense Béwouda; Cameroon	51.15
800 m	Saïda El Mehdi; Morocco	2:03.52	Charity Wandia; Kenya	2:04.08	Caroline Chepkwony; Kenya	2:04.58
1500 m	Nancy Lagat; Kenya	4:24.56	Saïda El Mehdi; Morocco	4:24.87	Jeruto Kiptum; Kenya	4:25.85
5000 m	Etalemahu Kidane; Ethiopia	16:25.83	Priscah Jepleting; Kenya	16:26.15	Angele Haronsimana; Burundi	16:55.99
10,000 m	Eyerusalem Kuma; Ethiopia	31:56.77	Irene Kwambai; Kenya	31:57.54	Catherine Kirui; Kenya	32:35.71
100 m hurdles	Lalanirina Rosa Rakotozafy; Madagascar	13.73	Carole Kaboud Mebam; Cameroon	14.07	Alima Soura; Burkina Faso	14.38
400 m hurdles	Surita Febbraio; South Africa	55.12	Mame Tacko Diouf; Senegal	55.62	Zahra Lachgar; Morocco	57.12
3000 m St.	Bouchra Chaabi; Morocco	9:53.46 CR	Nawal Baïbi; Morocco	10:11.42	Tebogo Masehla; South Africa	10:34.40
20 km walk	Grace Wanjiru; Kenya	1:42:45	Nicolene Cronje; South Africa	1:43:57	Bahia Boussad; Algeria	1:46:12
4 × 100 m relay	Nigeria; Gloria Kemasuode; Mercy Nku; Oludamola Osayomi; Endurance Ojokolo	44.32	South Africa; Dikeledi Moropane; Heide Seyerling; Adri Shoeman; Geraldine Pillay	44.42	Senegal; Fatoumata Coly; Aida Diop; Aissatou Badjo; Aminata Diouf	45.21
4 × 400 m relay	Senegal; Fatou Bintou Fall; Tacko Diouf; Aida Diop; Amy Mbacké Thiam	3:29.41	South Africa; Surita Febbraio; Adri Shoeman; Heide Seyerling; Estie Wittstock	3:30.12	Cameroon; Hortense Bewouda; Carole Kaboud; Muriel Noah; Delphine Atangana	3:30.77
High jump	Hestrie Cloete; South Africa	1.95	Samantha Dodd; South Africa	1.60	Janice Josephs; South Africa	1.50
Pole vault	Syrine Balti; Tunisia	4.00	Samantha Dodd; South Africa	3.80	Nancy Cheekoussen; Mauritius	3.70
Long jump	Kene Ndoye; Senegal	6.64	Kadiatou Camara; Mali	6.29	Yah Koïta; Mali	6.27
Triple jump	Yamilé Aldama; Sudan	14.90	Kene Ndoye; Senegal	14.44	Mariette Mien; Burkina Faso	12.61
Shot put	Wafa Ismail El Baghdadi; Egypt	15.53	Amel Ben Khaled; Tunisia	15.45	Alifatou Djibril; Togo	15.16
Discus throw	Elizna Naude; South Africa	57.50	Alifatou Djibril; Togo	52.62	Hiba Meshili Abu Zaghari; Egypt	50.58
Hammer throw	Marwa Hussein Arafat; Egypt	66.14 CR	Mouna Dani; Morocco	57.98	Hayat El Ghazi; Morocco	57.67
Javelin throw	Sunette Viljoen; South Africa	60.13	Aïda Sellam; Tunisia	54.68	Cecilia Kiplagat; Kenya	48.78
Heptathlon	Margaret Simpson; Ghana	6154 points	Janice Josephs; South Africa	5785 points	Céline Laporte; Seychelles	5172 points
WR world record | AR area record | CR championship record | GR games record | NR national record | OR Olympic record | PB personal best | SB season best | WL world leading (in a given season)

== Medal table ==
Rank	Nation	Gold	Silver	Bronze	Total
1	South Africa (RSA)	10	12	8	30
2	Kenya (KEN)	7	7	5	19
3	Nigeria (NGR)	4	3	0	7
4	Senegal (SEN)	3	4	1	8
5	Tunisia (TUN)	3	4	0	7
6	Ethiopia (ETH)	3	1	1	5
7	Morocco (MAR)	2	3	6	11
8	Mauritius (MRI)	2	1	2	5
9	Sudan (SUD)	2	1	1	4
10	Egypt (EGY)	2	0	3	5
11	Burkina Faso (BFA)	1	2	3	6
12	Cameroon (CMR)	1	1	3	5
13	Zimbabwe (ZIM)	1	0	1	2
14	Botswana (BOT)	1	0	0	1
14	Ghana (GHA)	1	0	0	1
14	Madagascar (MAD)	1	0	0	1
17	Mali (MLI)	0	2	1	3
18	Algeria (ALG)	0	1	3	4
19	Chad (CHA)	0	1	1	2
19	Togo (TOG)	0	1	1	2
21	Burundi (BDI)	0	0	1	1
21	Congo (COG)	0	0	1	1
21	Gambia (GAM)	0	0	1	1
21	Seychelles (SEY)	0	0	1	1
Totals (24 entries)		44	44	44	132

== See also ==
- 2004 in athletics (track and field)
