= Athletics at the 2013 Jeux de la Francophonie – Results =

These are the official results of the athletics competition at the 2013 Jeux de la Francophonie which took place on 10–14 September 2013 in Nice, France.

== Men's results ==
=== 100 meters ===
Heats – September 10
Wind:
Heat 1: -1.1 m/s, Heat 2: -1.4 m/s

Rank	Heat	Name	Nationality	Time	Notes
1	2	Emmanuel Biron	France	10.36	Q
2	1	Dontae Richards-Kwok	Canada	10.42	Q
3	1	Idrissa Adam	Cameroon	10.46	Q
3	2	Samuel Francis	Qatar	10.46	Q
5	1	Innocent Bologo	Burkina Faso	10.52	Q
5	2	Jared Connaughton	Canada	10.52	Q
7	1	Gogbeu Francis Koné	Ivory Coast	10.59	q
8	2	Gérard Kobéané	Burkina Faso	10.64	q
9	2	Aaron Bowman	Canada	10.64	
10	2	Hua Wilfried Koffi	Ivory Coast	10.89	
11	2	Steven Gugerli	Switzerland	10.95	
12	1	Gauthier Okawe	Gabon	11.59	
13	1	Reginado Monte Nguba	Equatorial Guinea	11.96	
	1	Arnaud Rémy	France	DQ	
	1	Béranger-Aymard Bossé	Central African Republic	DNS	
	1	Katim Touré	Senegal	DNS	
	2	Ulrich Alazoum	Central African Republic	DNS	
	2	Kerfalla Camara	Guinea	DNS	

Final – September 11

Rank	Lane	Name	Nationality	Time	Notes
1st place, gold medalist(s)	5	Emmanuel Biron	France	10.41	
2nd place, silver medalist(s)	3	Dontae Richards-Kwok	Canada	10.46	
3rd place, bronze medalist(s)	4	Samuel Francis	Qatar	10.53	
4	7	Jared Connaughton	Canada	10.61	
5	6	Idrissa Adam	Cameroon	10.69	
6	8	Innocent Bologo	Burkina Faso	10.73	
7	1	Gérard Kobéané	Burkina Faso	10.74	
8	2	Gogbeu Francis Koné	Ivory Coast	10.79	

=== 200 meters ===
Heats – September 13
Wind:
Heat 1: -1.5 m/s, Heat 2: -1.7 m/s, Heat 3: -0.9 m/s

Rank	Heat	Name	Nationality	Time	Notes
1	1	Oluwasegun Makinde	Canada	20.90	Q
2	3	Mickaël-Meba Zézé	France	21.42	Q
3	2	Idrissa Adam	Cameroon	21.44	Q
4	2	Jonathan Permal	Mauritius	21.54	Q
5	1	Robin Vanderbemden	Wallonia-Brussels	21.59	Q
6	1	David Alerte	France	21.61	q
7	2	Julien Watrin	Wallonia-Brussels	21.76	q
8	1	Fabrice Coiffic	Mauritius	21.77	
9	3	Gérard Kobéané	Burkina Faso	21.78	Q
10	2	Daniel Arsene Assoumou	Gabon	22.07	
11	1	Roman Turcani	Slovakia	22.28	
12	2	Kerfalla Camara	Guinea	23.05	
	1	Innocent Bologo	Burkina Faso	DNS	
	2	Jared Connaughton	Canada	DNS	
	3	Hua Wilfried Koffi	Ivory Coast	DNS	
	3	Gauthier Okawe	Gabon	DNS	
	3	Moussa Sissoko	Mali	DNS	
	3	Prince Yangou Kpiangui	Central African Republic	DNS	

Final – September 14

Rank	Lane	Name	Nationality	Time	Notes
1st place, gold medalist(s)	6	Oluwasegun Makinde	Canada	20.80	
2nd place, silver medalist(s)	4	Idrissa Adam	Cameroon	21.21	
3rd place, bronze medalist(s)	3	Jonathan Permal	Mauritius	21.35	
4	2	Julien Watrin	Wallonia-Brussels	21.56	
5	5	Mickaël-Meba Zézé	France	21.56	
6	1	David Alerte	France	21.61	
7	7	Gérard Kobéané	Burkina Faso	21.63	
8	8	Robin Vanderbemden	Wallonia-Brussels	21.68	

=== 400 meters ===
September 12

Rank	Lane	Name	Nationality	Time	Notes
1st place, gold medalist(s)	8	Antoine Gillet	Wallonia-Brussels	46.64	
2nd place, silver medalist(s)	5	Toumany Coulibaly	France	46.87	
2nd place, silver medalist(s)	2	Angel Chelala	France	46.87	
4	3	Philip Osei	Canada	46.89	
5	4	Dylan Borlée	Wallonia-Brussels	47.25	
6	7	Mamoudou-Elimane Hanne	France	47.93	
7	1	Moussa Zaroumeye	Niger	49.39	
8	6	Will Oyowe	Wallonia-Brussels	50.51	

=== 800 meters ===
Heats – September 10

Rank	Heat	Name	Nationality	Time	Notes
1	3	Musaab Bala	Qatar	1:47.84	Q
2	3	Abdessalem Ayouni	Tunisia	1:48.45	Q
3	3	Kyle Smith	Canada	1:48.60	q
4	3	Jozef Repčík	Slovakia	1:48.69	q
5	1	Samir Jamaa	Morocco	1:48.83	Q
6	3	Mamadou Gueye	Senegal	1:50.52	
7	1	Moussa Camara	Mali	1:50.90	Q
8	1	Jan Hochstrasser	Switzerland	1:51.54	
9	2	Nader Belhanbel	Morocco	1:53.11	Q
10	2	Hamid Oualich	France	1:53.33	Q
11	2	Geoffrey Harris	Canada	1:53.47	
12	1	Ahmat Mahamat Bachir	Chad	1:53.48	
13	1	Kieng Samorn	Cambodia	1:54.40	
13	2	Adam Gaudes	New Brunswick	1:54.40	
15	3	Pierre-Antoine Balhan	Wallonia-Brussels	1:54.69	
16	2	Christos Dimitriou	Cyprus	1:55.05	
17	3	Benjamín Enzema	Equatorial Guinea	1:57.31	
18	2	Abdoul Attoumane	Comoros	1:59.50	
	1	Moise Joseph	Haiti	DNS	
	2	Antoine Gakeme	Burundi	DNS	

Final – September 11

Rank	Name	Nationality	Time	Notes
1st place, gold medalist(s)	Musaab Bala	Qatar	1:46.57	
2nd place, silver medalist(s)	Samir Jamaa	Morocco	1:47.50	
3rd place, bronze medalist(s)	Nader Belhanbel	Morocco	1:47.72	
4	Jozef Repčík	Slovakia	1:48.01	
5	Kyle Smith	Canada	1:49.29	
6	Hamid Oualich	France	1:50.27	
7	Moussa Camara	Mali	1:50.38	
8	Abdessalem Ayouni	Tunisia	1:50.59	

=== 1500 meters ===
Heats – September 13

Rank	Heat	Name	Nationality	Time	Notes
1	2	Ben Othmen Zied	Tunisia	3:46.03	Q
2	2	Mohamed Moustaoui	Morocco	3:46.18	Q
3	2	Krzysztof Żebrowski	Poland	3:46.27	Q
4	2	Tarik Moukrime	Wallonia-Brussels	3:46.30	Q
5	2	Guillaume Adam	France	3:46.40	q
6	2	Mario Bächtiger	Switzerland	3:46.59	q
7	1	Ayanleh Souleiman	Djibouti	3:47.86	Q
8	1	Fouad El Kaam	Morocco	3:47.94	Q
9	2	David Karonei	Luxembourg	3:48.68	q
10	1	Charles Philibert-Thiboutot	Canada	3:49.07	Q
11	2	Samuel Freire	Cape Verde	3:49.54	q, SB
12	1	Kim Ruell	Wallonia-Brussels	3:49.69	Q
13	2	Fraser Kegel	Canada	3:49.72	
14	1	Peter Corrigan	Canada	3:50.98	
15	1	Stefan Breit	Switzerland	3:51.61	
16	1	Zabulon Ndikumana	Burundi	3:54.76	
17	1	Omar Bachir	Niger	4:01.89	
	1	Alex Figouari Moussi	Republic of the Congo	DNS	

Final – September 14

Rank	Name	Nationality	Time	Notes
1st place, gold medalist(s)	Ayanleh Souleiman	Djibouti	3:57.35	
2nd place, silver medalist(s)	Krzysztof Żebrowski	Poland	3:57.58	
3rd place, bronze medalist(s)	Fouad El Kaam	Morocco	3:57.91	
4	Mohamed Moustaoui	Morocco	3:57.97	
5	Mario Bächtiger	Switzerland	3:58.25	
6	Tarik Moukrime	Wallonia-Brussels	3:58.48	
7	Charles Philibert-Thiboutot	Canada	3:58.50	
8	Guillaume Adam	France	3:58.83	
9	Ben Othmen Zied	Tunisia	3:58.85	
10	Kim Ruell	Wallonia-Brussels	3:58.97	
11	David Karonei	Luxembourg	4:00.82	
12	Samuel Freire	Cape Verde	4:02.54	

=== 5000 meters ===
September 14

Rank	Name	Nationality	Time	Notes
1st place, gold medalist(s)	Othmane El Goumri	Morocco	13:48.76	
2nd place, silver medalist(s)	Younès Essalhi	Morocco	13:49.36	
3rd place, bronze medalist(s)	Youssouf Hiss Bachir	Djibouti	13:50.61	
4	Eric Sebahire	Rwanda	13:52.59	
5	Olivier Irabaruta	Burundi	13:55.10	
6	Abdellatif Meftah	France	13:57.06	
7	Monder Rizki	Wallonia-Brussels	14:02.66	
8	Ruben Sança	Cape Verde	14:29.07	
9	Timothée Bommier	France	14:30.90	
10	Abdoulaye Abdelkarim	Chad	14:52.72	

=== 10,000 meters ===
September 10

Rank	Name	Nationality	Time	Notes
1st place, gold medalist(s)	Hicham Bellani	Morocco	28:49.09	
2nd place, silver medalist(s)	Olivier Irabaruta	Burundi	28:53.34	
3rd place, bronze medalist(s)	Mustapha El Aziz	Morocco	29:05.05	
4	Cédric Pelissier	France	30:14.14	
5	Pierre Urruty	France	30:34.69	
6	Yannick Dupouy	France	30:44.85	
7	Eloge Mpundu	Burundi	30:51.22	
8	Rejean Chiasson	New Brunswick	31:37.62	
	Mumin Gala	Djibouti	DNF	
	Adilson Spencer Varela	Cape Verde	DNF	

=== 110 meters hurdles ===
September 11

Rank	Lane	Name	Nationality	Time	Notes
1st place, gold medalist(s)	4	Sékou Kaba	Canada	13.84	SB
2nd place, silver medalist(s)	5	Ladji Doucouré	France	13.95	
3rd place, bronze medalist(s)	7	Ingvar Moseley	Canada	14.02	
4	3	Samuel Coco-Viloin	France	14.14	
5	6	Simon Krauss	France	14.18	
6	8	Claude Godart	Luxembourg	14.72	
	2	Mohamed Koné	Mali	DNS	

=== 400 meters hurdles ===
Heats – September 13

Rank	Heat	Name	Nationality	Time	Notes
1	2	Yoann Décimus	France	50.07	Q
2	2	Mamadou Kassé Hann	Senegal	50.09	Q
3	2	Mohamed Sghaier	Tunisia	50.20	Q
4	1	Mickaël François	France	50.57	Q
5	1	Amadou Ndiaye	Senegal	51.10	Q
6	2	Tait Nystuen	Canada	51.69	q
7	2	Gabriel El Hanbli	Quebec	52.13	q
8	1	Jacques Frisch	Luxembourg	52.17	Q
9	1	Jonathan Puemi	Switzerland	52.74	
10	1	Maoulida Daroueche	Comoros	53.75	
11	1	Ali Hazer	Lebanon	54.73	
	2	Garnal Aboubaker	Qatar	DNS	

Final – September 14

Rank	Lane	Name	Nationality	Time	Notes
1st place, gold medalist(s)	6	Mamadou Kassé Hann	Senegal	49.48	
2nd place, silver medalist(s)	3	Yoann Décimus	France	50.05	
3rd place, bronze medalist(s)	7	Mohamed Sghaier	Tunisia	50.46	
4	4	Mickaël François	France	51.60	
5	8	Jacques Frisch	Luxembourg	51.87	
6	5	Amadou Ndiaye	Senegal	51.88	
7	2	Tait Nystuen	Canada	52.55	
8	1	Gabriel El Hanbli	Quebec	53.42	

=== 3000 meters steeplechase ===
September 14

Rank	Name	Nationality	Time	Notes
1st place, gold medalist(s)	Hamid Ezzine	Morocco	8:43.41	
2nd place, silver medalist(s)	Yoann Kowal	France	8:43.79	
3rd place, bronze medalist(s)	Maaz Abdelrahman Shagag	Qatar	8:45.16	
4	Mounatcer Zaghou	Morocco	8:45.36	
5	Chris Winter	Canada	8:54.28	
6	Tanguy Pepiot	France	9:03.12	
7	Gaylord Silly	Seychelles	9:08.47	PB
8	Ryan Brockerville	Canada	9:10.20	

=== 4 × 100 meters relay ===
September 12

Rank	Nation	Competitors	Time	Notes
1st place, gold medalist(s)	Canada	Aaron Bowman, Oluwasegun Makinde, Dontae Richards-Kwok, Jared Connaughton	39.14	
2nd place, silver medalist(s)	France	Mickaël-Meba Zézé, David Alerte, Arnaud Rémy, Emmanuel Biron	39.36	
3rd place, bronze medalist(s)	Wallonia-Brussels	Damien Broothaerts, Kevin Borlée, Jonathan Borlée, Julien Watrin	39.58	SB
4	Burkina Faso	Lassané Zongo, Innocent Bologo, Thierry Adanabou, Gérard Kobéané	40.35	SB
	Central African Republic		DNS	
	Ivory Coast		DNS	
	Poland		DNS	

=== 4 × 400 meters relay ===
September 14

Rank	Nation	Competitors	Time	Notes
1st place, gold medalist(s)	France	Toumany Coulibaly, Mamoudou-Elimane Hanne, Yoann Décimus, Angel Chelala	3:05.22	
2nd place, silver medalist(s)	Wallonia-Brussels	Robin Vanderbemden, Antoine Gillet, Dylan Borlée, Will Oyowe	3:06.24	
3rd place, bronze medalist(s)	Switzerland	Silvan Lutz, Kariem Hussein, Daniele Angelella, Philipp Weissenberger	3:07.21	
	Canada		DNS	

=== 20 kilometers walk ===
September 14

Rank	Name	Nationality	Time	Notes
1st place, gold medalist(s)	Kevin Campion	France	1:24:32	
2nd place, silver medalist(s)	Evan Dunfee	Canada	1:25:30	
3rd place, bronze medalist(s)	Mabrook Saleh Mohamed	Qatar	1:26:26	NR
4	Benjamin Thorne	Canada	1:30:50	
5	Aurélien Quinion	France	1:33:33	
6	Jérome Caprice	Mauritius	1:39:17	
	Antonin Boyez	France	DNS	

=== High jump ===
September 14

Rank	Name	Nationality	2.00	2.05	2.10	2.15	2.20	2.25	2.30	2.33	Result	Notes
1st place, gold medalist(s)	Derek Drouin	Canada	–	–	–	o	o	xo	o	xx	2.30	
2nd place, silver medalist(s)	Mickaël Hanany	France	–	–	o	o	o	o	xxo	xxx	2.30	
2nd place, silver medalist(s)	Mihai Donisan	Romania	–	–	o	o	o	o	xxo	xxx	2.30	
4	Fernand Djoumessi	Cameroon	–	–	o	o	o	xxx			2.20	
5	Abdoulaye Diarra	Mali	–	o	o	xo	xo	xxx			2.20	
6	Lukáš Beer	Slovakia	o	o	o	xo	xxo	xxx			2.20	
7	Fabrice Saint-Jean	France	–	o	o	o	xxx				2.15	
7	Muamer Aissa Barsham	Qatar	o	o	o	o	xxx				2.15	
9	Jeremy Eckert	Canada	o	xo	xo	xxx					2.10	
10	Thuy Dao Van	Vietnam	xo	xxo	xxo	xxx					2.10	
11	Jean-Paul Masanga-Mekombo	Democratic Republic of the Congo	o	xxx							2.00	

=== Pole vault ===
September 13

Rank	Name	Nationality	5.00	5.20	5.35	5.50	5.71	Result	Notes
1st place, gold medalist(s)	Valentin Lavillenie	France	–	o	o	xo	xxx	5.50	
2nd place, silver medalist(s)	Shawnacy Barber	Canada	o	xo	xxx			5.20	
2nd place, silver medalist(s)	Jason Wurster	Canada	–	xo	xxx			5.20	
4	David Foley	Quebec	o	xxx				5.00	
	Sami Belrhaiem	Tunisia	xxx					NM	

=== Long jump ===
September 11

Rank	Name	Nationality	#1	#2	#3	#4	#5	#6	Result	Notes
1st place, gold medalist(s)	Adrian Strzałkowski	Poland	7.58	7.90	7.99w	7.99w	7.64	7.54	7.99w	
2nd place, silver medalist(s)	Kafétien Gomis	France	7.64	7.61	7.81	6.51	7.73	x	7.81	
3rd place, bronze medalist(s)	Adrian Vasile	Romania	x	7.26	7.40	7.78w	7.70	x	7.78w	
4	Vardan Pahlevanyan	Armenia	x	7.59	x	7.09	7.76	x	7.76	
5	Arsen Sargsyan	Armenia	7.49	7.76w	x	x	x	x	7.76w	
6	Mamadou Gueye	Senegal	7.57	7.47	x	7.53	7.61	x	7.61	
7	Ndiss Kaba Badji	Senegal	7.58	7.52	7.53	x	7.41	7.50	7.58	
8	Mamadou Chérif Dia	Mali	7.34w	x	7.48	7.58	x	7.37	7.58	SB
9	Alaeddine Ben Hassine	Tunisia	7.38	7.35	7.25				7.38	SB
10	Patrick Massok	Quebec	7.01	6.02	7.36w				7.36w	
11	Taylor Stewart	Canada	x	x	7.35w				7.35w	
12	Roméo Nitia	Benin	6.69	5.93	–				6.69	
13	Krzysztof Lewandowski	Poland	4.65w	–	–				4.65w	

=== Triple jump ===
September 13

Rank	Name	Nationality	#1	#2	#3	#4	#5	#6	Result	Notes
1st place, gold medalist(s)	Yoann Rapinier	France	x	16.85	–	x	16.96	17.11	17.11	
2nd place, silver medalist(s)	Gaëtan Saku Bafuanga Baya	France	x	x	16.90	15.72	16.33	16.93	16.93	
3rd place, bronze medalist(s)	Tarik Bouguetaïb	Morocco	16.44	15.11	16.23	15.54	16.27	16.66	16.66	SB
4	Karol Hoffmann	Poland	x	x	16.32	16.42	16.41	16.66	16.66	SB
5	Samyr Lainé	Haiti	15.85	16.01	16.24	15.98	16.23	16.43	16.43	
6	Rashid Al-Mannai	Qatar	15.74	16.30	x	x	15.84	15.58	16.30	
7	Michał Lewandowski	Poland	16.20	x	x	16.05	15.65	x	16.20	
8	Hugo Mamba-Schlick	Cameroon	15.81	16.15	15.81	16.03	15.86w	15.64	16.15	
9	Mamadou Gueye	Senegal	16.03	15.88	14.27				16.03	
10	Hugues Fabrice Zango	Burkina Faso	x	x	15.97				15.97	PB
11	Mamadou Chérif Dia	Mali	15.52	15.16	15.70				15.70	
12	Adrian Daianu	Romania	15.24	15.46	x				15.46	
13	Cheikh Abba Badji	Senegal	14.75	15.04	14.84				15.04	

=== Shot put ===
September 10

Rank	Name	Nationality	#1	#2	#3	#4	#5	#6	Result	Notes
1st place, gold medalist(s)	Tomasz Majewski	Poland	20.18	x	19.99	19.99	x	x	20.18	GR
2nd place, silver medalist(s)	Gaëtan Bucki	France	19.33	x	x	x	x	x	19.33	
3rd place, bronze medalist(s)	Timothy Nedow	Canada	17.67	19.09	x	x	18.69	x	19.09	
4	Bob Bertemes	Luxembourg	18.72	x	18.09	18.78	18.36	x	18.78	NR
5	Franck Elemba	Republic of the Congo	17.14	17.85	17.33	18.09	18.68	18.62	18.68	
6	Timothy Hendry-Gallagher	Canada	18.01	18.07	18.61	x	x	x	18.61	
7	Dominik Witczak	Poland	17.48	17.55	17.63	17.54	18.21	18.00	18.21	
8	Frédéric Dagée	France	16.88	x	17.00	x	17.08	x	17.08	
9	Badri Obeid	Lebanon	16.31	16.74	16.36				16.74	
10	Sylvain Pierre-Louis	Mauritius	15.15	x	x				15.15	

=== Discus throw ===
September 11

Rank	Name	Nationality	#1	#2	#3	#4	#5	#6	Result	Notes
1st place, gold medalist(s)	Sergiu Ursu	Romania	60.98	x	62.87	x	x	x	62.87	
2nd place, silver medalist(s)	Rashid Shafi Al-Dosari	Qatar	58.75	58.32	x	55.84	x	59.06	59.06	
3rd place, bronze medalist(s)	Ahmed Dheeb	Qatar	57.96	57.75	58.65	56.98	x	58.04	58.65	
4	Lolassonn Djouhan	France	55.61	55.53	x	x	x	53.30	55.61	
5	Andrei Gag	Romania	54.80	x	55.60	x	54.60	x	55.60	
6	Lukas Jost	Switzerland	x	53.24	51.92	49.75	x	50.46	53.24	
7	Jean Elvino Pierre-Louis	Mauritius	49.23	x	x	49.64	52.23	50.41	52.23	
8	Marc-Antoine Lafrenaye-Dugas	Quebec	50.73	x	49.97	49.97	x	47.52	50.73	
9	Brent Roubos	Canada	47.51	46.58	46.95				47.51	

=== Hammer throw ===
September 10

Rank	Name	Nationality	#1	#2	#3	#4	#5	#6	Result	Notes
1st place, gold medalist(s)	Paweł Fajdek	Poland	75.41	78.28	72.85	75.66	77.99	75.38	78.28	
2nd place, silver medalist(s)	Quentin Bigot	France	73.13	x	73.47	72.36	74.60	74.52	74.60	
3rd place, bronze medalist(s)	Ashraf Amgad Elseify	Qatar	67.93	72.88	72.30	x	69.87	x	72.88	
4	Jérôme Bortoluzzi	France	x	66.87	72.04	69.33	70.97	71.68	72.04	
5	James Steacy	Canada	69.90	x	70.34	x	68.49	x	70.34	
6	Driss Barid	Morocco	x	67.04	x	x	67.15	67.64	67.64	
7	Martin Bingisser	Switzerland	54.87	60.40	61.91	x	x	x	61.91	
8	Marc-Antoine Lafrenaye-Dugas	Quebec	57.55	x	55.28	57.60	x	57.60	57.60	
9	Nicholas Li Yun Fong	Mauritius	55.58	54.74	54.76				55.58	

=== Javelin throw ===
September 12

Rank	Name	Nationality	#1	#2	#3	#4	#5	#6	Result	Notes
1st place, gold medalist(s)	Łukasz Grzeszczuk	Poland	x	75.13	78.62	76.15	x	75.15	78.62	GR
2nd place, silver medalist(s)	Curtis Moss	Canada	72.44	70.22	69.05	69.69	75.42	76.04	76.04	
3rd place, bronze medalist(s)	Killian Durechou	France	72.39	68.76	68.45	x	73.22	72.07	73.22	
4	Antoine Wagner	Luxembourg	68.86	67.02	70.55	x	x	63.99	70.55	
5	Caleb Jones	New Brunswick	69.69	65.55	x	68.78	66.73	68.62	69.69	
6	Kyle Nielsen	Canada	x	67.15	66.04	68.98	x	66.81	68.98	
7	Melik Janoyan	Armenia	x	60.67	63.52	x			63.52	
8	Kaida Mohamed Ibrahim	Qatar	59.20	62.35	x				62.35	

=== Decathlon ===
September 12–13

The highest mark recorded in each event is highlighted in yellow

Rank	Athlete	Nationality	100m	LJ	SP	HJ	400m	110m H	DT	PV	JT	1500m	Points	Notes
1st place, gold medalist(s)	Bastien Auzeil	France	11.18	7.34	15.11	1.89	50.29	14.66	42.04	5.10	54.04	4:55.94	7789	
2nd place, silver medalist(s)	Darko Pešić	Montenegro	11.33	7.15	15.11	2.01	50.95	14.91	41.76	4.10	57.76	4:35.57	7636	
3rd place, bronze medalist(s)	Guillaume Thierry	Mauritius	11.45	7.10	13.96	1.89	51.81	15.14	41.81	4.70	60.69	4:45.61	7511	
4	Ali Kamé	Madagascar	11.31	7.35	12.91	1.92	51.22	15.12	38.66	4.40	61.38	4:44.75	7456	
5	Frédéric Xhonneux	Wallonia-Brussels	11.79	7.04	13.55	1.95	50.36	15.17	37.76	4.20	53.36	4:28.15	7289	
	Pat Arbour	Canada	11.80	6.64	14.11	1.86	55.07	DNS	–	–	–	–	DNF	
	Walid Nsiri	Tunisia	11.21	6.65	12.06	NM	DNS	–	–	–	–	–	DNF	

== Women's results ==
=== 100 meters ===
Heats – September 10
Wind:
Heat 1: -1.4 m/s, Heat 2: -1.0 m/s, Heat 3: -1.2 m/s

Rank	Heat	Name	Nationality	Time	Notes
1	2	Andreea Ogrăzeanu	Romania	11.69	Q
2	1	Ayodelé Ikuesan	France	11.71	Q
3	3	Shai-Anne Davis	Canada	11.84	Q
4	3	Émilie Gaydu	France	11.89	Q
5	3	Fanny Appes Ekanga	Cameroon	11.94	q
6	2	Marisa Lavanchy	Switzerland	11.99	Q
7	2	Hinikissia Albertine Ndikert	Chad	12.13	q
8	1	Olivia Borlée	Wallonia-Brussels	12.14	Q
9	3	Kadidiatou Traoré	Burkina Faso	12.15	
10	2	Sergine Kouanga	Cameroon	12.23	
11	1	Lorène Bazolo	Republic of the Congo	12.39	
12	1	Joanne Loutoy	Seychelles	12.41	
12	3	Adeline Gouenon	Ivory Coast	12.41	
14	1	Lidiane Lopes	Cape Verde	12.85	
15	2	Dianne Audrey Nioze	Seychelles	12.93	
	2	Carima Louami	France	DQ	
	2	Rahina Moussa	Niger	DQ	
	1	Marie-Josée Ta Lou	Ivory Coast	DNS	
	3	Julie Kasongo Pitali	DR Congo	DNS	

Final – September 11

Rank	Lane	Name	Nationality	Time	Notes
1st place, gold medalist(s)	3	Ayodelé Ikuesan	France	11.72	
2nd place, silver medalist(s)	4	Andreea Ogrăzeanu	Romania	11.72	
3rd place, bronze medalist(s)	5	Shai-Anne Davis	Canada	11.80	
4	6	Émilie Gaydu	France	11.82	
5	8	Marisa Lavanchy	Switzerland	12.02	
6	7	Fanny Appes Ekanga	Cameroon	12.03	
7	1	Olivia Borlée	Wallonia-Brussels	12.28	
8	2	Hinikissia Albertine Ndikert	Chad	12.32	

=== 200 meters ===
Heats – September 13
Wind:
Heat 1: -1.6 m/s, Heat 2: -1.6 m/s

Rank	Heat	Name	Nationality	Time	Notes
1	1	Crystal Emmanuel	Canada	23.55	Q
2	2	Léa Sprunger	Switzerland	23.91	Q
3	2	Andreea Ogrăzeanu	Romania	24.00	Q
4	1	Cynthia Bolingo Mbongo	Wallonia-Brussels	24.02	Q
5	2	Sarah Atcho	Switzerland	24.67	Q
6	1	Joëlle Golay	Switzerland	24.70	Q
7	2	Kadidiatou Traoré	Burkina Faso	24.71	q
8	1	Fatoumata Diop	Senegal	25.16	q
9	2	Elodie Pierre-Louis	Mauritius	25.23	
10	2	Marlene Mevong Mba	Equatorial Guinea	26.00	
11	1	Lidiane Lopes	Cape Verde	26.17	
	1	Adeline Gouenon	Ivory Coast	DNS	
	1	Fanny Appes Ekanga	Cameroon	DNS	
	2	Sergine Kouanga	Cameroon	DNS	
	2	Julie Kasongo Pitali	DR Congo	DNS	

Final – September 14

Rank	Lane	Name	Nationality	Time	Notes
1st place, gold medalist(s)	3	Crystal Emmanuel	Canada	23.63	
2nd place, silver medalist(s)	5	Léa Sprunger	Switzerland	23.83	
3rd place, bronze medalist(s)	6	Cynthia Bolingo Mbongo	Wallonia-Brussels	24.08	
4	4	Andreea Ogrăzeanu	Romania	24.44	
5	7	Joëlle Golay	Switzerland	24.99	
6	2	Fatoumata Diop	Senegal	25.09	
7	1	Kadidiatou Traoré	Burkina Faso	25.10	
8	8	Sarah Atcho	Switzerland	25.17	

=== 400 meters ===
Heats – September 11

Rank	Heat	Name	Nationality	Time	Notes
1	2	Floria Gueï	France	51.95	Q
2	1	Marie Gayot	France	52.31	Q
3	2	Bianca Răzor	Romania	52.62	Q
4	2	Alicia Brown	Canada	53.30	Q
5	1	Adelina Pastor	Romania	53.47	Q
6	1	Adrienne Power	Canada	53.73	Q
7	2	Lydie Besme Hawa	Chad	54.62	q
8	1	Hasna Grioui	Morocco	54.77	q
9	1	Alexandra Štuková	Slovakia	55.00	
10	2	Fatoumata Diop	Senegal	55.04	
11	2	Frédérique Hansen	Luxembourg	55.69	
12	1	Audrey Nkamsao	Cameroon	56.41	
13	1	Charline Mathias	Luxembourg	56.56	
14	2	Natacha Ngoye	Republic of the Congo	57.11	

Final – September 12

Rank	Lane	Name	Nationality	Time	Notes
1st place, gold medalist(s)	3	Floria Gueï	France	52.31	
2nd place, silver medalist(s)	6	Marie Gayot	France	52.33	
3rd place, bronze medalist(s)	5	Bianca Răzor	Romania	52.69	
4	8	Alicia Brown	Canada	53.66	
5	7	Adrienne Power	Canada	54.08	
6	4	Adelina Pastor	Romania	54.80	
7	1	Lydie Besme Hawa	Chad	55.02	PB
8	2	Hasna Grioui	Morocco	55.88	

=== 800 meters ===
Heats – September 13

Rank	Heat	Name	Nationality	Time	Notes
1	3	Malika Akkaoui	Morocco	2:04.65	Q
2	3	Karine Belleau-Béliveau	Canada	2:04.69	Q
3	3	Angelika Cichocka	Poland	2:04.76	q
4	1	Siham Hilali	Morocco	2:05.73	Q
5	1	Joanna Jóźwik	Poland	2:05.94	Q
6	1	Jessica Smith	Canada	2:06.01	q
7	2	Elena Mirela Lavric	Romania	2:06.60	Q
8	2	Melissa Bishop	Canada	2:06.76	Q
9	2	Noélie Yarigo	Benin	2:06.76	
10	2	Clarisse Moh	France	2:07.66	
11	2	Lemlem-Bere Ogbasilassie	Quebec	2:07.69	
12	3	Annabelle Lascar	Mauritius	2:10.88	
13	1	Rénelle Lamote	France	2:10.89	
14	3	Natalia Evangelidou	Cyprus	2:11.89	
15	1	Saria Traboulsi	Lebanon	2:12.06	
16	1	Grace Annear	New Brunswick	2:14.58	
17	2	Ramatou Salifou	Niger	2:36.45	

Final – September 14

Rank	Name	Nationality	Time	Notes
1st place, gold medalist(s)	Elena Mirela Lavric	Romania	2:02.27	
2nd place, silver medalist(s)	Malika Akkaoui	Morocco	2:02.61	
3rd place, bronze medalist(s)	Melissa Bishop	Canada	2:03.44	
4	Siham Hilali	Morocco	2:03.73	
5	Joanna Jóźwik	Poland	2:03.76	
6	Angelika Cichocka	Poland	2:04.04	
7	Karine Belleau-Béliveau	Canada	2:04.26	
8	Jessica Smith	Canada	2:09.31	

=== 1500 meters ===
September 12

Rank	Name	Nationality	Time	Notes
1st place, gold medalist(s)	Rababe Arafi	Morocco	4:18.70	
2nd place, silver medalist(s)	Siham Hilali	Morocco	4:18.89	
3rd place, bronze medalist(s)	Angelika Cichocka	Poland	4:19.37	
4	Kate Van Buskirk	Canada	4:20.00	
5	Katarzyna Broniatowska	Poland	4:21.22	
6	Danuta Urbanik	Poland	4:21.87	
7	Ioana Doaga	Romania	4:22.85	
8	Sandra Beuviere	France	4:24.69	
9	Joëlle Flück	Switzerland	4:25.17	
10	Martine Nobili	Luxembourg	4:26.25	
11	Annie LeBlanc	Canada	4:26.39	
12	Andrea Seccafien	Canada	4:27.79	
13	Lydia Frost	New Brunswick	4:28.41	
14	Erica Digby	Canada	4:38.75	
15	Nadine Frost	New Brunswick	4:44.42	

=== 10,000 meters ===
September 13

Rank	Name	Nationality	Time	Notes
1st place, gold medalist(s)	Diane Nukuri	Burundi	32:29.14	GR
2nd place, silver medalist(s)	Khadija Sammah	Morocco	32:38.42	
3rd place, bronze medalist(s)	Claudette Mukasakindi	Rwanda	33:20.87	
4	Natasha Wodak	Canada	33:31.02	
5	Malika Bel Lafkir	Morocco	35:50.30	
6	Catrin Jones	Canada	36:08.23	

=== 100 meters hurdles ===
Heats – September 12
Wind:
Heat 1: -2.7 m/s, Heat 2: -1.4 m/s

Rank	Heat	Name	Nationality	Time	Notes
1	2	Anne Zagré	Wallonia-Brussels	13.46	Q
2	2	Rosvitha Okou	Ivory Coast	13.62	Q
3	2	Clélia Reuse	Switzerland	13.75	Q
4	1	Gnima Faye	Senegal	13.86	Q
5	1	Christie Gordon	Canada	13.91	Q
6	1	Marthe Koala	Burkina Faso	13.95	Q
7	1	Aisseta Diawara	France	14.02	q
8	2	Karolina Kołeczek	Poland	14.13	q
9	1	Marie-Eve Dugas	Canada	14.15	
10	2	Karelle Edwards	Canada	14.18	
11	2	Yamina Hajaji	Morocco	14.22	
12	2	Rahmatou Dramé	Mali	14.33	
13	1	Elodie Jakob	Switzerland	14.37	
14	1	Katarzyna Świostek	Poland	14.37	
15	1	Selma Abdelhamid	Tunisia	16.11	
16	2	Bibiana Olama	Equatorial Guinea	18.30	

Final – September 13

Rank	Lane	Name	Nationality	Time	Notes
1st place, gold medalist(s)	6	Anne Zagré	Wallonia-Brussels	13.41	
2nd place, silver medalist(s)	4	Gnima Faye	Senegal	13.47	
3rd place, bronze medalist(s)	7	Clélia Reuse	Switzerland	13.57	
4	3	Christie Gordon	Canada	13.59	
5	5	Rosvitha Okou	Ivory Coast	13.69	
6	1	Aisseta Diawara	France	13.72	
7	8	Marthe Koala	Burkina Faso	13.75	PB
8	2	Karolina Kołeczek	Poland	14.08	

=== 400 meters hurdles ===
Heats – September 10

Rank	Heat	Name	Nationality	Time	Notes
1	2	Noelle Montcalm	Canada	58.24	Q
2	1	Lamiae Lhabze	Morocco	58.38	Q
3	2	Hayat Lambarki	Morocco	58.43	Q
4	1	Joanna Linkiewicz	Poland	58.61	Q
5	1	Sanda Belgyan	Romania	58.99	Q
6	2	Mame Fatou Faye	Senegal	59.09	Q
7	2	Valentine Arrieta	Switzerland	59.28	q
8	2	Émeline Bauwe	France	59.70	q
9	1	Amaliya Sharoyan	Armenia	59.90	
10	1	Kim Reuland	Luxembourg	1:01.42	
11	2	Audrey Nkamsao	Cameroon	1:01.53	
12	1	Fanny Lefevre	France	1:02.46	

Final – September 11

Rank	Lane	Name	Nationality	Time	Notes
1st place, gold medalist(s)	3	Hayat Lambarki	Morocco	57.22	
2nd place, silver medalist(s)	4	Noelle Montcalm	Canada	57.52	
3rd place, bronze medalist(s)	8	Mame Fatou Faye	Senegal	57.66	
4	5	Joanna Linkiewicz	Poland	57.99	
5	1	Valentine Arrieta	Switzerland	58.88	
6	6	Lamiae Lhabze	Morocco	58.89	
7	7	Sanda Belgyan	Romania	59.08	
8	2	Émeline Bauwe	France	59.44	

=== 3000 meters steeplechase ===
September 12

Rank	Name	Nationality	Time	Notes
1st place, gold medalist(s)	Ancuța Bobocel	Romania	9:46.82	
2nd place, silver medalist(s)	Salima El Ouali Alami	Morocco	9:48.53	
3rd place, bronze medalist(s)	Geneviève Lalonde	New Brunswick	9:53.35	PB
4	Chantelle Groenewoud	Canada	10:05.88	
5	Eliane Saholinirina	Madagascar	10:15.64	
6	Jessica Furlan	Canada	10:16.21	
7	Jarfel Hallouma	Tunisia	11:01.08	
	Fadwa Sidi Madane	Morocco	DNF	

=== 4 × 100 meters relay ===
September 12

Rank	Nation	Competitors	Time	Notes
1st place, gold medalist(s)	Wallonia-Brussels	Laura Leprince, Laetitia Libert, Cynthia Bolingo Mbongo, Anne Zagré	44.70	SB
2nd place, silver medalist(s)	Switzerland	Clélia Reuse, Sarah Atcho, Marisa Lavanchy, Léa Sprunger	45.01	
3rd place, bronze medalist(s)	France	Aisseta Diawara, Carima Louami, Émilie Gaydu, Ayodelé Ikuesan	45.03	
4	Canada	Marie-Eve Dugas, Adrienne Power, Karelle Edwards, Crystal Emmanuel	45.66	
5	Ivory Coast	Rosvitha Okou, Triphene Kouame Adjoua, Fatou Tamadiani Meité, Adeline Gouenon	45.84	
6	Mauritius	Marie Joanilla Janvier, Aurelie Alcindor, Marie Guillaume, Elodie Pierre-Louis	46.55	SB
7	Cameroon	Sergine Kouanga, Fanny Appes Ekanga, Audrey Nkamsao, Sarah Ngo Ngoa	47.23	
8	Luxembourg	Frédérique Hansen, Shanila Mutumba, Laurence Jones, Tiffany Tshilumba	47.61	

=== 4 × 400 meters relay ===
September 14

Rank	Nation	Competitors	Time	Notes
1st place, gold medalist(s)	Romania	Sanda Belgyan, Elena Mirela Lavric, Adelina Pastor, Bianca Răzor	3:29.81	
2nd place, silver medalist(s)	Canada	Adrienne Power, Melissa Bishop, Noelle Montcalm, Alicia Brown	3:34.25	
3rd place, bronze medalist(s)	France	Émeline Bauwe, Clarisse Moh, Fanny Lefevre, Floria Gueï	3:35.20	
4	Morocco	Hasna Grioui, Hayat Lambarki, Lamiae Lhabze, Malika Akkaoui	3:37.48	NR
5	Luxembourg	Frédérique Hansen, Charline Mathias, Martine Nobili, Laurence Jones	3:49.54	

=== 20 kilometers walk ===
September 14

Rank	Name	Nationality	Time	Notes
1st place, gold medalist(s)	Laura Polli	Switzerland	1:37:23	GR
2nd place, silver medalist(s)	Ines Pastorino	France	1:39:14	
3rd place, bronze medalist(s)	Corinne Baudoin	France	1:40:39	
4	Marie Polli	Switzerland	1:41:12	
5	Emilie Menuet	France	1:49:12	

=== High jump ===
September 11

Rank	Name	Nationality	1.70	1.75	1.80	1.83	1.86	1.88	1.90	1.92	Result	Notes
1st place, gold medalist(s)	Melanie Skotnik	France	–	o	o	o	o	xxo	o	xxx	1.90	
2nd place, silver medalist(s)	Justyna Kasprzycka	Poland	–	–	o	o	xo	o	x–	xx	1.88	
3rd place, bronze medalist(s)	Michelle Theophille	Canada	o	o	o	xo	xo	xxx			1.86	
4	Nafissatou Thiam	Wallonia-Brussels	o	xo	o	xxo	xxx				1.83	
5	Thi Diem Pham	Vietnam	o	xo	xxo	xxx					1.80	

=== Pole vault ===
September 11

Rank	Name	Nationality	3.60	3.75	3.90	4.00	4.10	4.20	4.40	4.50	Result	Notes
1st place, gold medalist(s)	Marion Lotout	France	–	–	–	–	–	o	o	xxx	4.40	GR
2nd place, silver medalist(s)	Fanny Smets	Wallonia-Brussels	–	–	–	–	xo	o	xo	x	4.40	NR
3rd place, bronze medalist(s)	Heather Hamilton	Canada	–	–	–	–	o	xxx			4.10	
3rd place, bronze medalist(s)	Syrine Balti-Ebondo	Tunisia	–	–	o	o	o	xxx			4.10	
5	Alysha Newman	Canada	–	xo	xxo	xo	xo	xxx			4.10	
6	Ariane Beaumont-Courteau	Quebec	xo	o	o	xxx					3.90	
7	Edna Semedo	Luxembourg	o	o	xxx						3.75	
	Marion Buisson	France									NM	
	Anna Katharina Schmid	Switzerland									NM	

=== Long jump ===
September 14

Rank	Name	Nationality	#1	#2	#3	#4	#5	#6	Result	Notes
1st place, gold medalist(s)	Anna Jagaciak	Poland	6.47	6.43	6.62	6.68	6.58	x	6.68	GR
2nd place, silver medalist(s)	Teresa Dobija	Poland	6.30	x	6.66	x	x	6.65	6.66	
3rd place, bronze medalist(s)	Christabel Nettey	Canada	6.37	6.30	6.51	6.53	x	6.63	6.63	
4	Alina Rotaru	Romania	4.63	6.54	6.48	6.57	x	6.40	6.57w	
5	Cornelia Deiac	Romania	x	x	6.40	x	6.48w	4.53	6.48w	
6	Sarah Ngo Ngoa	Cameroon	5.82	6.10	6.26	6.02	6.36	6.33	6.36	
7	Sandisha Antoine	Saint Lucia	6.11	5.46	x	6.10	x	6.09	6.11	
8	Karolina Błażej	Poland	6.03w	6.11	5.82	5.74	6.02	x	6.11	
9	Sandrine Mbumi	Cameroon	5.81	6.02	5.94				6.02	
10	Noemie Combettes	France	5.90	5.88	5.85				5.90	
11	Christel El Saneh	Lebanon	x	5.58	x				5.58	
	Nafissatou Thiam	Wallonia-Brussels							DNS	

=== Triple jump ===
September 14

Rank	Name	Nationality	#1	#2	#3	#4	#5	#6	Result	Notes
1st place, gold medalist(s)	Anna Jagaciak	Poland	13.90	13.92	x	13.80	x	x	13.92	
2nd place, silver medalist(s)	Carmen Toma	Romania	13.92	x	13.82	x	13.83	x	13.92	
3rd place, bronze medalist(s)	Sandrine Mbumi	Cameroon	13.10	13.42	13.44	13.36	13.31	13.34w	13.44	
4	Nathalie Marie-Nély	France	13.02	x	x	13.27	13.14	13.07	13.27	
5	Worokia Sanou	Burkina Faso	12.80	x	13.16	x	x	11.69	13.16	
6	Sandisha Antoine	Saint Lucia	12.90	12.90	13.13w	x	x	13.02	13.13w	
7	Linda Onana	Cameroon	x	12.73	12.82	12.55	x	x	12.82	
	Anna Zych	Poland							DNS	

=== Shot put ===
September 14

Rank	Name	Nationality	#1	#2	#3	#4	#5	#6	Result	Notes
1st place, gold medalist(s)	Anca Heltne	Romania	x	17.14	x	x	16.85	16.73	17.14	
2nd place, silver medalist(s)	Fabienne Digard	France	15.32	14.86	14.89	15.08	15.18	x	15.32	
3rd place, bronze medalist(s)	Auriol Dongmo Mekemnang	Cameroon	14.92	x	x	14.73	15.21	15.30	15.30	
4	Chelsea Whalen	Canada	14.71	x	x	15.09	x	x	15.09	
5	Alex Porlier-Langlois	Quebec	13.25	13.84	14.11	13.97	x	13.85	14.11	
	Kadiatou Camara	Guinea							DNS	

=== Discus throw ===
September 12

Rank	Name	Nationality	#1	#2	#3	#4	#5	#6	Result	Notes
1st place, gold medalist(s)	Kazai Suzanne Kragbé	Ivory Coast	52.40	52.53	x	55.33	55.58	54.84	55.58	
2nd place, silver medalist(s)	Lucie Catouillart	France	x	50.43	53.12	48.80	49.92	x	53.12	
3rd place, bronze medalist(s)	Pauline Pousse	France	52.07	52.83	53.07	x	x	51.80	53.07	
4	Marie-Josée Le Jour	Canada	51.73	x	46.10	49.10	50.80	49.35	51.73	SB
5	Maminata Soura	Burkina Faso	43.52	46.01	43.32	46.53	48.45	x	48.45	PB
6	Alex Porlier-Langlois	Quebec	40.04	43.39	x	x	x	x	43.39	

=== Hammer throw ===
September 13

Rank	Name	Nationality	#1	#2	#3	#4	#5	#6	Result	Notes
1st place, gold medalist(s)	Anita Włodarczyk	Poland	71.25	73.24	75.62	x	x	x	75.62	GR
2nd place, silver medalist(s)	Bianca Perie	Romania	70.06	68.82	69.03	70.41	x	68.50	70.41	
3rd place, bronze medalist(s)	Alexandra Tavernier	France	65.11	67.03	63.29	67.76	66.48	69.95	69.95	
4	Sultana Frizell	Canada	64.45	67.85	x	x	65.98	x	67.85	
5	Alexia Sedykh	France	67.61	65.63	66.80	64.46	67.03	64.68	67.61	
6	Joanna Fiodorow	Poland	66.69	66.59	x	67.53	x	x	67.53	
7	Amy Sène	Senegal	x	x	63.66	x	65.13	63.12	65.13	
8	Heather Steacy	Canada	62.87	x	61.13	x	x	x	62.87	
9	Sarah Bensaad	Tunisia	60.41	x	57.43				60.41	
10	Nicole Zihlmann	Switzerland	60.02	x	59.95				60.02	
11	Annie Larose	Quebec	x	55.63	55.75				55.75	
12	Elizabeth MacDonald	New Brunswick	48.01	51.19	x				51.19	
	Lætitia Bambara	Burkina Faso							DNS	

=== Javelin throw ===
September 14

Rank	Name	Nationality	#1	#2	#3	#4	#5	#6	Result	Notes
1st place, gold medalist(s)	Krista Woodward	Canada	50.74	x	45.14	x	48.68	52.82	52.82	
2nd place, silver medalist(s)	Alexia Kogut Kubiak	France	48.13	49.80	x	48.68	x	51.35	51.35	
3rd place, bronze medalist(s)	Jessica Rosun	Mauritius	x	49.36	45.45	44.94	44.65	x	49.36	PB
4	Mathilde Andraud	France	48.63	x	x	x	x	48.70	48.70	
5	Sonia Chartrand	Quebec	x	x	48.20	x	43.27	x	48.20	PB
6	Pascaline Adanhouegbe	Benin	43.95	46.22	46.05	40.50	45.32	43.24	46.22	
7	Pascale Dumont	Quebec	x	x	37.50	32.53	–	35.20	37.50	

=== Heptathlon ===
September 10–11

The highest mark recorded in each event is highlighted in yellow

Rank	Athlete	Nationality	100m H	HJ	SP	200m	LJ	JT	800m	Points	Notes
1st place, gold medalist(s)	Laura Arteil	France	14.96	1.60	13.23	25.75	5.89	44.20	2:19.87	5534	
2nd place, silver medalist(s)	Madelaine Buttinger	Canada	15.46	1.72	12.00	26.83	5.68	33.61	2:19.47	5177	
3rd place, bronze medalist(s)	Nada Chroudi	Tunisia	14.85	1.60	12.71	26.70	5.12	40.29	2:32.81	4966	
	Gabriela Kouassi	Ivory Coast	DNS	–	–	–	–	–	–	DNS	
