= Athletics at the 2007 All-Africa Games – Women's 100 metres hurdles =

African women athletic games

The women's 100 metres hurdles at the 2007 All-Africa Games were held on July 19–20.

== Medalists ==
Gold	Silver	Bronze
Toyin Augustus; Nigeria	Jessica Ohanaja; Nigeria	Fatmata Fofanah; Guinea

== Results ==
=== Heats ===
Qualification: First 3 of each heat (Q) and the next 2 fastest (q) qualified for the final.

Wind:
Heat 1: -0.5 m/s, Heat 2: -0.5 m/s

Rank	Heat	Name	Nationality	Time	Notes
1	1	Jessica Ohanaja	Nigeria	13.30	Q
2	2	Toyin Augustus	Nigeria	13.44	Q
3	1	Béatrice Kamboulé	Burkina Faso	13.67	Q
4	2	Alyma Sourah	Burkina Faso	13.82	Q
5	2	Fatmata Fofanah	Guinea	13.84	Q
6	2	Gnima Faye	Senegal	13.90	q
7	1	Rosina Amenebede	Ghana	13.97	Q
8	1	Samira Harrouche	Algeria	14.19	q
9	1	Mame Fatou	Senegal	14.23	
10	1	Telma Cossa	Mozambique	14.89	
11	2	Tamla Denise Pietersen	Zimbabwe	14.91	
12	1	Tayara Chaouch	Algeria	15.04	
	2	Naima Bentahar	Algeria	DNF	
	2	Carole Kaboud Mebam	Cameroon	DNF	

=== Final ===
Wind: +1.3 m/s

Rank	Name	Nationality	Time	Notes
1st place, gold medalist(s)	Toyin Augustus	Nigeria	13.23	
2nd place, silver medalist(s)	Jessica Ohanaja	Nigeria	13.27	
3rd place, bronze medalist(s)	Fatmata Fofanah	Guinea	13.76	
4	Béatrice Kamboulé	Burkina Faso	13.76	
5	Gnima Faye	Senegal	13.85	
6	Rosina Amenebede	Ghana	13.85	
7	Alyma Soura	Burkina Faso	13.94	
8	Samira Harrouche	Algeria	14.41	
