= 2012 African Championships in Athletics – Women's 100 metres hurdles =

The men's 100 metres hurdles at the 2012 African Championships in Athletics was held at the Stade Charles de Gaulle on 27 and 28 June.

== Medalists ==
Gold	Gnima Faye; Senegal
Silver	Amina Ferguen; Algeria
Bronze	Uhunoma Osazuwa; Nigeria

== Records ==
Standing records prior to the 2012 African Championships in Athletics
World record	Yordanka Donkova (BUL)	12.21	Stara Zagora, Bulgaria	20 August 1988
African record	Glory Alozie (NGR)	12.44	Fontvieille, Monaco	28 August 1998
African record	Glory Alozie (NGR)	12.44	Brussels, Belgium	28 August 1998
African record	Glory Alozie (NGR)	12.44	Seville, Spain	28 August 1999
Championship record	Glory Alozie (NGR)	12.77	Dakar, Senegal	19 August 1998

== Schedule ==
Date	Time	Round
27 June 2012	16:00	Round 1
28 June 2012	14:40	Final

== Results ==
=== Round 1 ===
First 2 in each heat (Q) and 2 best performers (q) advance to the Final.

Rank	Heat	Lane	Name	Nationality	Time	Note
1	2	5	Gnima Faye	Senegal	13.92	Q
2	2	7	Seun Adigun	Nigeria	14.03	Q
2	3	4	Amina Ferguen	Algeria	14.03	Q
4	1	2	Rosvitha Okou	Ivory Coast	14.21	Q
5	3	5	Uhunoma Osazuwa	Nigeria	14.26	Q
6	1	4	Jessica Ohanaja	Nigeria	14.34	Q
7	1	5	Rosa Rakotozafy	Madagascar	14.35	q
8	3	3	Claudia Viljoen	South Africa	14.49	q
9	3	2	Rahamatou Dramé	Mali	14.55	
10	1	6	Linda Simon	Ghana	14.57	
10	1	3	Yamina Hjaji	Morocco	14.57	
12	2	8	Rosina Amenebede	Ghana	14.61	
13	3	7	Adja Arette Ndiaye	Senegal	14.64	
14	2	4	Lecabela Quaresma	São Tomé and Príncipe	15.59	
15	2	6	Ansulet Potgieter	South Africa	17.25	
16	2	2	Bibiana Olama	Equatorial Guinea	18.31	
	1	7	Marthe Koala	Burkina Faso	DNS	
	1	8	Konjot Teshome	Ethiopia	DNS	
	2	3	Fiona Asigbee	Ghana	DNS	
	3	8	Carole Kaboud Mebam	Cameroon	DNS	
	3	6	Telma Cossa	Mozambique	DNS	

=== Final ===
Rank	Lane	Name	Nationality	Time	Note
1st place, gold medalist(s)	3	Gnima Faye	Senegal	13.36	
2nd place, silver medalist(s)	4	Amina Ferguen	Algeria	13.56	
3rd place, bronze medalist(s)	7	Uhunoma Osazuwa	Nigeria	13.61	
4	8	Jessica Ohanaja	Nigeria	13.63	
5	1	Rosa Rakotozafy	Madagascar	13.70	
6	5	Rosvitha Okou	Ivory Coast	13.74	
7	1	Claudia Viljoen	South Africa	13.97	
	2	Seun Adigun	Nigeria	DSQ	
