= Athletics at the 2011 All-Africa Games – Women's triple jump =

The Women's Triple jump at the 2011 All-Africa Games took place on 19 and 22 August at the Estádio Nacional do Zimpeto.

== Medalists ==
Gold	Baya Rahouli (ALG)
Silver	Kene Ndoye (SEN)
Bronze	Otonye Iworima (NGR)

== Records ==
Prior to this competition, the existing World, African record and World leading were as follows:

World record	Inessa Kravets (UKR)	15.50	Gothenburg, Sweden	10 August 1995
World leading	Yargelis Savigne (CUB)	14.99	Paris, France	8 July 2011
World leading	Caterine Ibargüen (COL)	14.99	Bogotá, Colombia	13 August 2011
African record	Françoise Mbango Etone (CMR)	15.39	Beijing, China	17 August 2008

No new world or Olympic records were set for this event.

== Results ==
=== Cancelled results ===
The competition held initially on September 11, but appeal jury of CAA decided to cancel the results and reorganise the event on September 15, due to confusion after Otonye Iworima had a jump wrongly measured at 14.47.

Rank	Athlete	Nationality	Wind	#1	#2	#3	#4	#5	#6	Result	Notes
1	Baya Rahouli	Algeria	+1.8	X	X	13.40	13.54	13.97	14.02	14.02m	
2	Kene Ndoye	Senegal	-0.5	13.51	13.59	13.74	13.54	13.45	13.63	13.74m	
3	Sarah Nambawa	Uganda	-1.8	12.88	13.73	13.60	X	13.42	X	13.73m	
4	Otonye Iworima	Nigeria	-0.3	13.44	X	13.47	13.63	X	13.46	13.63m	
5	Blessing Ibrahim	Nigeria	-0.5	12.77	12.85	13.05	13.13	13.00	12.64	13.13m	
6	Worokia Sanou	Burkina Faso	-1.2	X	13.02	13.01	X	13.06		13.06m	
7	Sandrine Mbumi	Cameroon	-1.0	12.79	X	12.30	12.54	12.28	12.68	12.79m	
8	Lecabela Fonseca Quaresma	São Tomé and Príncipe	-1.4	12.60	X	X	12.23	X	X	12.60m	

=== Retake results ===
On September 15, the tournament held on again, but once again, the Nigerian athlete Otonye Iworim was false marked by the jury before contestation by the Algerian and Malian delegation, and the result of Otonye Iworim was corrected to 13.48m.

Rank	Athlete	Nationality	#1	#2	#3	#4	#5	#6	Result	Wind	Notes
1st place, gold medalist(s)	Baya Rahouli	Algeria	14.08	14.04	X	14.08	X	X	14.08m	-2.5	
2nd place, silver medalist(s)	Kene Ndoye	Senegal	X	X	12.74	13.39	13.69	X	13.69m	-0.7	
3rd place, bronze medalist(s)	Otonye Iworima	Nigeria	13.45	13.48	13.47	X	13.53	13.47	13.53m	-0.3	
4	Worokia Sanou	Burkina Faso	12.90	13.08	13.32	13.18	X	12.85	13.32m	-1.5	
5	Sandrine Mbumi	Cameroon	12.68	X	13.05	13.05	X	13.32	13.32m	-0.5	
6	Blessing Ibrahim	Nigeria	12.91m	13.15	12.94	13.17	13.06	12.96	13.17m	-1.2	
7	Lecabela Fonseca Quaresm	São Tomé and Príncipe	12.96	12.88	12.62	12.05	X	X	12.96m	-1.5	
8	Sarah Ngo Ngoa	Cameroon	12.74	X	X	12.47	X	12.50	12.74m	-0.3	
9	Cisse Tounkara	Mali	11.77	12.33	12.48	X	X	X	12.48m	-0.2	
10	Lerato Sechele	Lesotho	11.86	X	11.83	X	X	X	11.86m	-3.8	
	Sarah Nambawa	Uganda							DNS		
	Fayza Omer	Sudan							DNS		
