= 2012 African Championships in Athletics – Women's triple jump =

The women's triple jump at the 2012 African Championships in Athletics was held at the Stade Charles de Gaulle on 1 July.

== Medalists ==
Gold	Sarah Nambawa; Uganda
Silver	Charlene Potgieter; South Africa
Bronze	Jamaa Chnaik; Morocco

== Records ==
Standing records prior to the 2012 African Championships in Athletics
World record	Inessa Kravets (UKR)	15.50	Gothenburg, Sweden	10 August 1995
African record	Françoise Mbango Etone (CMR)	15.39	Beijing, PR China	17 August 2008
Championship record	Françoise Mbango Etone (CMR)	14.95	Tunis, Tunisia	7 August 2002

== Schedule ==
Date	Time	Round
1 July 2012	16:15	Final

== Results ==
=== Final ===
Rank	Athlete	Nationality	#1	#2	#3	#5	#5	#6	Result	Notes
1st place, gold medalist(s)	Sarah Nambawa	Uganda	13.30	x	13.59	13.86	13.90w	x	13.90w	
2nd place, silver medalist(s)	Charlene Potgieter	South Africa	13.44	13.80	13.81w	x	13.90w	x	13.90w	
3rd place, bronze medalist(s)	Jamaa Chnaik	Morocco	13.22	13.40	x	13.60w	13.75	x	13.75	
4	Baya Rahouli	Algeria	13.34	13.32	13.50	x	x	x	13.50	
5	Blessing Ibuknu	Nigeria	13.02w	13.17	13.37	13.07w	13.35w	13.44	13.44	
6	Lecabela Quaresma	São Tomé and Príncipe	x	13.25	13.24w	12.89	x	–	13.25	
7	Patience Ntshingila	South Africa	x	13.18	13.10	x	x	x	13.18	
8	Enas Mansour	Egypt	12.52	12.68w	12.97w	12.78	12.86	12.85w	12.97w	
9	Mathilde Boateng	Ghana	x	12.49	12.74				12.74	
10	Sangone Kandji	Senegal	12.60	x	11.86				12.60	
11	Sandrine Mbummin	Cameroon	x	12.23	12.32w				12.32w	
12	Linda Onana	Cameroon	x	x	12.15				12.15	
13	Janet Boniface	Seychelles	x	x	11.77w				11.77w	
14	Konan Akissi Issifou	Ivory Coast	x	x	11.53				11.53	
	Worokia Sanou	Burkina Faso							DNS	
