= Chinonye =

Female given name

- Gender: Female
- Language: Igbo

Origin
- Origin: Igbo
- Meaning: Chi is with me or chi sympathizes
- Region of origin: Igboland

Other names
- Variant form: Nonye

Chinonye // is a female name used by the Igbo tribe of Nigeria. The name means "chi is with me" or "chi sympathizes" which is perfect for parents who want their girl child to have a name that reflects her strong faith and connection to a higher power.

== Notable people with the name ==
- Chinonye Chukwu, Nigerian American film director
- Chinonye Ohadugha, Nigerian triple jumper
