= 2002 World Junior Championships in Athletics – Women's long jump =

The women's long jump event at the 2002 World Junior Championships in Athletics was held in Kingston, Jamaica, at National Stadium on 18 and 19 July.

== Medalists ==
Gold	Adina Anton; Romania
Silver	Wang Lina; China
Bronze	Esther Aghatise; Nigeria

== Results ==
=== Final ===
19 July

Rank	Name	Nationality	Attempts						Result	Notes
Rank	Name	Nationality	1	2	3	4	5	6	Result	Notes
1st place, gold medalist(s)	Adina Anton	Romania	5.95 (w: -0.1 m/s)	6.33 (w: +0.3 m/s)	6.37 (w: +0.2 m/s)	6.46 (w: +0.6 m/s)	4.17 (w: -2.1 m/s)	-	6.46 (w: +0.6 m/s)	
2nd place, silver medalist(s)	Wang Lina	China	6.36 (w: 0.0 m/s)	x	6.07 (w: 0.0 m/s)	6.12 (w: +0.5 m/s)	x	3.93 (w: -0.6 m/s)	6.36 (w: 0.0 m/s)	
3rd place, bronze medalist(s)	Esther Aghatise	Nigeria	6.19 (w: -1.0 m/s)	5.99 (w: -0.9 m/s)	6.33 (w: -0.6 m/s)	6.34 (w: -0.2 m/s)	x	5.88 (w: -0.2 m/s)	6.34 (w: -0.2 m/s)	
4	Sophie Krauel	Germany	6.18 (w: +0.2 m/s)	6.05 (w: -0.6 m/s)	6.19 (w: -0.1 m/s)	x	4.76 (w: +0.2 m/s)	6.25 (w: -0.8 m/s)	6.25 (w: -0.8 m/s)	
5	Shermin Oksuz	Australia	6.06 (w: -0.8 m/s)	x	6.12 (w: +0.7 m/s)	x	6.24 (w: +0.7 m/s)	5.87 (w: -0.8 m/s)	6.24 (w: +0.7 m/s)	
6	Jacinta Boyd	Australia	4.61 (w: NWI)	6.07 (w: -0.6 m/s)	5.92 (w: -0.5 m/s)	5.95 (w: +0.2 m/s)	6.18 (w: +0.6 m/s)	6.23 (w: +0.2 m/s)	6.23 (w: +0.2 m/s)	
7	Kateryna Chernyavska	Ukraine	6.23 (w: +0.3 m/s)	5.64 (w: -0.9 m/s)	5.89 (w: 0.0 m/s)	6.11 (w: -0.1 m/s)	6.16 (w: -0.1 m/s)	x	6.23 (w: +0.3 m/s)	
8	Yudelkis Fernández	Cuba	5.84 (w: -0.2 m/s)	6.02 (w: 0.0 m/s)	6.16 (w: +0.1 m/s)	x	6.09 (w: +0.6 m/s)	5.88 (w: -0.7 m/s)	6.16 (w: +0.1 m/s)	
9	Katarzyna Klisowska	Poland	5.90 (w: -0.4 m/s)	x	5.95 (w: +0.1 m/s)				5.95 (w: +0.1 m/s)	
10	Fernanda Gonçalves	Brazil	x	5.93 (w: -0.5 m/s)	x				5.93 (w: -0.5 m/s)	
11	Bi Xiaohui	China	x	x	5.87 (w: +0.3 m/s)				5.87 (w: +0.3 m/s)	
12	Erica McLain	United States	5.75 (w: -0.7 m/s)	5.59 (w: -0.9 m/s)	5.69 (w: +0.7 m/s)				5.75 (w: -0.7 m/s)	

=== Qualifications ===
18 Jul

==== Group A ====
Rank	Name	Nationality	Attempts			Result	Notes
Rank	Name	Nationality	1	2	3	Result	Notes
1	Esther Aghatise	Nigeria	6.38 (w: +1.0 m/s)	-	-	6.38 (w: +1.0 m/s)	Q
2	Sophie Krauel	Germany	6.26 (w: +1.4 m/s)	5.94 (w: +0.2 m/s)	5.83 (w: +1.0 m/s)	6.26 (w: +1.4 m/s)	q
3	Erica McLain	United States	6.02 (w: +1.1 m/s)	5.98 (w: +0.3 m/s)	6.19 (w: +0.9 m/s)	6.19 (w: +0.9 m/s)	q
4	Bi Xiaohui	China	x	6.15 (w: +1.1 m/s)	-	6.15 (w: +1.1 m/s)	q
5	Jacinta Boyd	Australia	5.90 (w: +1.0 m/s)	6.11 (w: +0.3 m/s)	5.87 (w: +0.2 m/s)	6.11 (w: +0.3 m/s)	q
6	Yargelis Savigne	Cuba	x	6.00 (w: +1.0 m/s)	5.87 (w: +1.0 m/s)	6.00 (w: +1.0 m/s)	
7	Yelena Kremneva	Russia	x	5.87 (w: -0.2 m/s)	5.99 (w: 0.0 m/s)	5.99 (w: 0.0 m/s)	
8	Narayane Dossévi	France	5.98 (w: +0.7 m/s)	x	5.82 w (w: +2.7 m/s)	5.98 (w: +0.7 m/s)	
9	Keila Costa	Brazil	x	x	5.98 (w: +1.1 m/s)	5.98 (w: +1.1 m/s)	
10	Tatyana Bocharova	Kazakhstan	5.62 (w: +1.4 m/s)	5.38 (w: +1.8 m/s)	5.88 (w: -0.8 m/s)	5.88 (w: -0.8 m/s)	
11	Delia Visser	South Africa	5.81 (w: +1.2 m/s)	5.54 (w: +1.0 m/s)	5.71 (w: +0.6 m/s)	5.81 (w: +1.2 m/s)	
12	Kerri-Ann Mitchell	Canada	5.73 (w: +0.9 m/s)	x	5.47 (w: +0.9 m/s)	5.73 (w: +0.9 m/s)	
13	Cristine Spataru	Romania	5.57 (w: +1.2 m/s)	5.54 (w: +0.7 m/s)	5.42 (w: +0.1 m/s)	5.57 (w: +1.2 m/s)	

==== Group B ====
Rank	Name	Nationality	Attempts			Result	Notes
Rank	Name	Nationality	1	2	3	Result	Notes
1	Shermin Oksuz	Australia	x	x	6.29 (w: +1.3 m/s)	6.29 (w: +1.3 m/s)	q
2	Kateryna Chernyavska	Ukraine	6.27 (w: +0.8 m/s)	6.26 (w: +1.1 m/s)	6.24 (w: +1.2 m/s)	6.27 (w: +0.8 m/s)	q
3	Katarzyna Klisowska	Poland	6.12 (w: +1.5 m/s)	x	6.27 (w: +1.3 m/s)	6.27 (w: +1.3 m/s)	q
4	Yudelkis Fernández	Cuba	6.22 w (w: +2.1 m/s)	4.79 (w: +1.6 m/s)	6.21 (w: +0.9 m/s)	6.22 w (w: +2.1 m/s)	q
5	Wang Lina	China	x	6.14 (w: +1.3 m/s)	-	6.14 (w: +1.3 m/s)	q
6	Adina Anton	Romania	x	5.92 (w: +0.6 m/s)	6.13 (w: +0.1 m/s)	6.13 (w: +0.1 m/s)	q
7	Fernanda Gonçalves	Brazil	x	x	6.10 (w: +0.8 m/s)	6.10 (w: +0.8 m/s)	q
8	Kathrin Geissler	Germany	6.05 (w: +0.9 m/s)	5.93 (w: -0.1 m/s)	5.82 (w: +1.1 m/s)	6.05 (w: +0.9 m/s)	
9	Peta-Gaye Beckford	Jamaica	5.80 (w: +1.1 m/s)	5.74 (w: +0.7 m/s)	5.93 (w: +1.0 m/s)	5.93 (w: +1.0 m/s)	
10	Jeong Soon-Ok	South Korea	5.75 (w: +1.0 m/s)	x	5.89 w (w: +2.1 m/s)	5.89 w (w: +2.1 m/s)	
11	Krysia Bayley	Canada	5.84 (w: +1.8 m/s)	5.74 (w: +0.5 m/s)	x	5.84 (w: +1.8 m/s)	
	Marquita Aldridge	United States	x	x	x	NM	

== Participation ==
According to an unofficial count, 25 athletes from 17 countries participated in the event.

- Australia (2)
- Brazil (2)
- Canada (2)
- China (2)
- Cuba (2)
- France (1)
- Germany (2)
- Jamaica (1)
- Kazakhstan (1)
- Nigeria (1)
- Poland (1)
- Romania (2)
- Russia (1)
- South Africa (1)
- South Korea (1)
- Ukraine (1)
- United States (2)
