= Athletics at the 2006 Commonwealth Games – Women's triple jump =

Women's triple jump at the Commonwealth Games

The women's triple jump event at the 2006 Commonwealth Games was held on March 21.

== Results ==
Rank	Athlete	Nationality	#1	#2	#3	#4	#5	#6	Result	Notes
1st place, gold medalist(s)	Trecia Smith	Jamaica	13.96	14.03	14.39	x	–	–	14.39	
2nd place, silver medalist(s)	Otonye Iworima	Nigeria	13.53	13.07	11.83	13.46	x	x	13.53	
3rd place, bronze medalist(s)	Nadia Williams	England	x	13.11	13.42	13.18	13.12	x	13.42	
4	Chinonyelum Ohadugha	Nigeria	12.99	x	12.77	12.71	12.65	13.26	13.26	
5	Nkiruka Domike	Nigeria	x	11.59	13.01	13.24	x	13.12	13.24	
6	Jeanette Bowles	Australia	12.83	12.96	13.17	13.05	13.16	13.23	13.23	
7	Michelle Robinson	England	x	x	12.09	12.80	x	12.67	12.80	
8	Soko Salaniqiqi	Fiji	x	11.61	x	x	11.54	x	11.61	
	Kay Vaughn	Belize							DNS	
