= Angela Atede =

Nigerian hurdler (born 1972)

Personal information
- Born: 8 February 1972 (age 54)

Sport
- Sport: Track and field
Medal record
Representing Nigeria
Commonwealth Games
Silver medal – second place	2002 Manchester	100 m hurdles
Summer Universiade
Gold medal – first place	1997 Catania	100 m hurdles
African Games
Gold medal – first place	2003 Abuja	100 m hurdles
Silver medal – second place	1995 Harare	100 m hurdles
Silver medal – second place	1999 Johannesburg	100 m hurdles
African Championships
Silver medal – second place	2002 Radès	100 m hurdles

Angela Atede (born 8 February 1972) is a Nigerian athlete who mainly competes in the 100 metres hurdles. Her personal best is 12.72 seconds, achieved in 1998.

== Competition record ==
Year	Competition	Venue	Position	Event	Notes
Representing Nigeria
1994	Commonwealth Games	Victoria, Canada	–	100 m hurdles	DNF
1995	All-Africa Games	Harare, Zimbabwe	2nd	100 m hurdles	13.01
1996	Olympic Games	Atlanta, United States	12th (qf)	100 m hurdles	12.85
1997	World Championships	Seville, Spain	9th (sf)	100 m hurdles	12.91
1997	World Championships	Seville, Spain	7th	4 × 100 m relay	43.27
1997	Universiade	Catania, Italy	1st	100 m hurdles	13.16
1999	World Championships	Seville, Spain	19th (qf)	100 m hurdles	12.98
1999	All-Africa Games	Johannesburg, South Africa	2nd	100 m hurdles	12.99
2000	Olympic Games	Sydney, Australia	16th (sf)	100 m hurdles	13.11
2002	Commonwealth Games	Manchester, United Kingdom	2nd	100 m hurdles	12.98
2002	African Championships	Tunis, Tunisia	2nd	100 m hurdles	13.16 (w)
2003	World Championships	Paris, France	19th (sf)	100 m hurdles	13.18
2003	All-Africa Games	Abuja, Nigeria	1st	100 m hurdles	13.01
2003	Afro-Asian Games	Hyderabad, India	1st	100 m hurdles	13.18
