= 1992 European Athletics Indoor Championships – Women's triple jump =

The women's triple jump event at the 1992 European Athletics Indoor Championships was held in Palasport di Genova on 29 February.

== Results ==
| Rank | Name | Nationality | #1 | #2 | #3 | #4 | #5 | #6 | Result | Notes |
|---|---|---|---|---|---|---|---|---|---|---|
| 1st place, gold medalist(s) | Inessa Kravets | Unified Team | 13.73 | 13.95 | 14.15 | x | 13.59 | – | 14.15 | CR |
| 2nd place, silver medalist(s) | Sofiya Bozhanova | Bulgaria | 13.98 | 13.74 | 13.81 | 13.88 | x | x | 13.98 | |
| 3rd place, bronze medalist(s) | Helga Radtke | Germany | x | 13.59 | x | x | 13.75 | x | 13.75 | |
| 4 | Šárka Kašpárková | Czechoslovakia | x | 13.66 | 13.51 | 13.73 | x | 13.46 | 13.73 | |
| 5 | Ljudmila Ninova | Austria | 12.76 | 13.28 | 13.67 | 13.26 | x | 13.65 | 13.67 | NR |
| 6 | Ināra Curko | Latvia | 12.96 | 13.39 | 13.22 | 13.47 | 13.42 | x | 13.47 | |
| 7 | Loredana Rossi | Italy | 13.45 | x | 13.04 | 13.12 | x | x | 13.45 | |
| 8 | Concepción Paredes | Spain | 13.38 | 13.36 | 13.22 | 13.30 | x | 13.39 | 13.39 | |
| 9 | Antonella Capriotti | Italy | x | 13.36 | 13.19 | | | | 13.36 | |
| 10 | Sylvie Borda | France | x | 13.05 | 13.24 | | | | 13.24 | |
| 11 | Carina Kjellman | Finland | 13.19 | 13.16 | 13.16 | | | | 13.19 | |
| 12 | Nicoleta Filip | Romania | 11.31 | x | 13.19 | | | | 13.19 | |
| 13 | Sandrine Domain | France | 12.99 | 13.17 | 12.81 | | | | 13.17 | |
| 14 | Michelle Griffith | Great Britain | 13.10 | x | 12.83 | | | | 13.10 | |
| 15 | Zsuzsa Vanyek | Hungary | 12.94 | 13.02 | x | | | | 13.02 | |
| 16 | Luisa Celesia | Italy | x | 12.93 | x | | | | 12.93 | |
| 17 | Claudia Gerhardt | Germany | 12.90 | x | 12.79 | | | | 12.90 | |
| 18 | Ana Oliveira | Portugal | x | x | 12.89 | | | | 12.89 | |
| 19 | Ildikó Fekete | Hungary | 12.53 | 12.85 | 12.86 | | | | 12.86 | |
| 20 | Ragne Kytölä | Finland | 12.76 | 12.54 | 12.70 | | | | 12.76 | |
| 21 | Tanja Borrmann | Germany | 12.68 | 12.29 | x | | | | 12.68 | |
| 22 | Urszula Włodarczyk | Poland | 12.67 | 12.65 | 12.58 | | | | 12.67 | |
