= 2008 African Championships in Athletics – Women's 100 metres hurdles =

The women's 100 metres hurdles event at the 2008 African Championships in Athletics was held at the Addis Ababa Stadium on April 30–May 1.

== Medalists ==
Gold	Silver	Bronze
Fatmata Fofanah; Guinea	Olutoyin Augustus; Nigeria	Carole Kaboud Mebam; Cameroon

== Results ==
=== Heats ===
Qualification: First 3 of each heat (Q) and the next 2 fastest (q) qualified for the final.

Wind: Heat 1: +0.6 m/s, Heat 2: +0.7 m/s

Rank	Heat	Name	Nationality	Time	Notes
1	1	Fatmata Fofanah	Guinea	13.33	Q
2	2	Olutoyin Augustus	Nigeria	13.39	Q
3	2	Carole Kaboud Mebam	Cameroon	13.58	Q
4	2	Christine Ras	South Africa	13.89	Q
5	1	Adja Arette Ndiaye	Senegal	13.99	Q
6	2	Alyma Soura	Burkina Faso	14.22	q
7	1	Marie Lucie Nga'a Ngono	Cameroon	14.82	Q
8	2	Gertrude Lossou	Togo	15.68	q
9	2	Weynua Welde	Ethiopia	16.23	
10	1	Tigist Getnet	Ethiopia	16.45	
11	1	Yodit Dejene	Ethiopia	17.19	
	1	Béatrice Kamboulé	Burkina Faso	DNS	

=== Final ===
Wind: -0.2 m/s

Rank	Lane	Name	Nationality	Time	Notes
1st place, gold medalist(s)	5	Fatmata Fofanah	Guinea	13.10	CR
2nd place, silver medalist(s)	4	Olutoyin Augustus	Nigeria	13.12	
3rd place, bronze medalist(s)	6	Carole Kaboud Mebam	Cameroon	13.52	
4	8	Christine Ras	South Africa	13.82	
5	3	Adja Arette Ndiaye	Senegal	14.08	
6	1	Alyma Soura	Burkina Faso	14.16	
7	7	Marie Lucie Nga'a Ngono	Cameroon	14.16	
8	2	Gertrude Lossou	Togo	DNF	
