= Kéné Ndoye =

Senegalese athlete (1978–2023)

Medal record

Women's athletics

Representing Senegal

All-Africa Games
Gold medal – first place	2003 Abuja	Triple jump
Silver medal – second place	2011 Maputo	Triple jump

African Championships
Gold medal – first place	1996 Yaoundé	Triple jump
Gold medal – first place	2000 Algiers	Long jump
Gold medal – first place	2004 Brazzaville	Long jump
Silver medal – second place	2002 Radès	Long jump
Silver medal – second place	2002 Radès	Triple jump
Silver medal – second place	2004 Brazzaville	Triple jump
Silver medal – second place	2006 Bambous	Long jump
Silver medal – second place	2006 Bambous	Triple jump
Bronze medal – third place	1996 Yaoundé	Long jump
Bronze medal – third place	1998 Dakar	Triple jump
Bronze medal – third place	2000 Algiers	Triple jump
Bronze medal – third place	2002 Radès	100 m hurdles

Kéne Ndoye (20 November 1978 – 13 February 2023) was a Senegalese track and field athlete, competing internationally for Senegal. She was 14th in the triple jump at the 2004 Olympic Games.

Ndoye won Senegal's first world indoor medal when she took bronze in the triple jump at the 2003 World Indoor Championships. She was also successful in the African Championships in Athletics where she won ten medals in athletics (three Gold, three Silver and four Bronze). She had three All Africa Games Medals (one Gold, two Bronze) and won the Golden Lion as Senegal's top sports person for 2003. She was a scholarship holder with the Olympic Solidarity program from November 2002. She died on 13 February 2023, aged 44.

== International competitions ==
Year	Competition	Venue	Position	Event	Notes
Representing Senegal
1996	African Championships	Yaoundé, Cameroon	3rd	Long jump	5.85 m
1996	African Championships	Yaoundé, Cameroon	1st	Triple jump	12.99 m
1996	World Junior Championships	Sydney, Australia	21st (q)	Long jump	5.42 m (wind: -0.6 m/s)
1996	World Junior Championships	Sydney, Australia	25th (q)	Triple jump	12.10 m (wind: +0.9 m/s)
1997	African Junior Championships	Ibadan, Nigeria	4th	Triple jump	12.67 m
1998	African Championships	Dakar, Senegal	3rd	Triple jump	13.30 m
1999	World Championships	Seville, Spain	17th (q)	Triple jump	13.90 m
1999	All-Africa Games	Johannesburg, South Africa	4th	Long jump	6.47 m
1999	All-Africa Games	Johannesburg, South Africa	3rd	Triple jump	13.88 m
2000	African Championships	Algiers, Algeria	1st	Long jump	6.39 m
2000	African Championships	Algiers, Algeria	3rd	Triple jump	13.81 m
2000	Olympic Games	Sydney, Australia	14th (q)	Triple jump	13.96 m
2002	African Championships	Radès, Tunisia	3rd	100 m hurdles	13.72 s (w)
2002	African Championships	Radès, Tunisia	2nd	Long jump	6.45 m (w)
2002	African Championships	Radès, Tunisia	2nd	Triple jump	14.28 m
2003	World Indoor Championships	Birmingham, United Kingdom	3rd	Triple jump	14.72 m (iNR)
2003	World Championships	Paris, France	10th	Triple jump	14.29 m
2003	All-Africa Games	Abuja, Nigeria	4th	Long jump	6.37 m
2003	All-Africa Games	Abuja, Nigeria	1st	Triple jump	14.23 m
2004	World Indoor Championships	Budapest, Hungary	22nd (q)	Triple jump	13.77 m
2004	African Championships	Brazzaville, Republic of the Congo	1st	Long jump	6.64 m
2004	African Championships	Brazzaville, Republic of the Congo	2nd	Triple jump	14.44 m
2004	Olympic Games	Athens, Greece	22nd (q)	Long jump	6.45 m
2004	Olympic Games	Athens, Greece	14th	Triple jump	14.18 m
2005	World Championships	Helsinki, Finland	6th	Triple jump	14.47 m
2006	World Indoor Championships	Moscow, Russia	13th (q)	Triple jump	13.88 m
2006	African Championships	Bambous, Mauritius	2nd	Long jump	6.30 m
2006	African Championships	Bambous, Mauritius	2nd	Triple jump	14.08 m (w)
2011	All-Africa Games	Maputo, Mozambique	2nd	Triple jump	13.69 m
