= 1990 European Athletics Indoor Championships – Women's triple jump =

The women's triple jump event at the 1990 European Athletics Indoor Championships was held in Kelvin Hall on 3 March. This was the first time that this event was held at a major international competition.

== Results ==
Rank	Name	Nationality	#1	#2	#3	#4	#5	#6	Result	Notes
1st place, gold medalist(s)	Galina Chistyakova	Soviet Union	13.63	13.91	14.09				14.14	WR, CR
2nd place, silver medalist(s)	Helga Radtke	East Germany	13.16	13.23	13.41				13.63	
3rd place, bronze medalist(s)	Ana Isabel Oliveira	Portugal							13.44	NR
4	Monika Špičková	Czechoslovakia							12.67	
5	Carmen Murga	Spain							12.57	
6	Evette Finikin	Great Britain							12.43	
7	Michelle Griffith	Great Britain							12.39	
8	Alison Forbes	Great Britain							11.51	
