= 2004 African Championships in Athletics – Women's triple jump =

The women's triple jump event at the 2004 African Championships in Athletics was held in Brazzaville, Republic of the Congo on July 14.

== Results ==
Rank	Name	Nationality	Result	Notes
1st place, gold medalist(s)	Yamilé Aldama	Sudan	14.90	
2nd place, silver medalist(s)	Kéné Ndoye	Senegal	14.44	
3rd place, bronze medalist(s)	Mariette Mien	Burkina Faso	12.61	
4	Telma Cossa	Mozambique	11.85	NR
5	Goma Bondzo	Republic of the Congo	11.42	
