= Athletics at the 1993 Summer Universiade – Women's triple jump =

The women's triple jump event at the 1993 Summer Universiade was held at the UB Stadium in Buffalo, United States on 16 and 17 July 1993.

== Medalists ==
Gold	Silver	Bronze
Niurka Montalvo; Cuba	Šárka Kašpárková; Czech Republic	Monica Toth; Romania

== Results ==
=== Qualification ===
Rank	Group	Athlete	Nationality	Result	Notes
1	B	Niurka Montalvo	Cuba	13.88	
2	B	Barbara Lah	Italy	13.50	
3	A	Monica Toth	Romania	13.49	
4	B	Tanja Borrmann	Germany	13.48	
5	A	Agnieszka Stańczyk	Poland	13.43	
6	?	Šárka Kašpárková	Czech Republic	13.42	
7	?	Michelle Griffith	Great Britain	13.34	
8	A	Viktoriya Vershynina	Ukraine	13.33	
9	?	Ksenija Predikaka	Slovenia	13.32	
10	?	Claudia Haywood	United States	13.31	
11	?	Petra Laux-Schneider	Germany	13.21	
12	?	Anni Paananen	Finland	13.09	
13	?	Tamara Malešev	Independent Participants	13.04	
14	?	Connie Henry	Great Britain	12.99	
15	?	Cynthea Rhodes	United States	12.90	
16	?	Olimpia Menelaou	Cyprus	12.58	
17	?	Kelly Dinsmore	Canada	12.38	
18	A	Mariklud Viduka	Australia	12.34	

=== Final ===
Rank	Athlete	Nationality	Result	Notes
1st place, gold medalist(s)	Niurka Montalvo	Cuba	14.16 (w)	
2nd place, silver medalist(s)	Šárka Kašpárková	Czech Republic	14.00 (w)	
3rd place, bronze medalist(s)	Monica Toth	Romania	13.96 (w)	
4	Michelle Griffith	Great Britain	13.75	
5	Viktoriya Vershynina	Ukraine	13.54	
6	Petra Laux-Schneider	Germany	13.53	
7	Tanja Borrmann	Germany	13.45	
8	Agnieszka Stańczyk	Poland	13.44	
9	Claudia Haywood	United States	13.28	
10	Barbara Lah	Italy	13.21	
11	Ksenija Predikaka	Slovenia	12.77	
	Anni Paananen	Finland	NM	
