= Marisa Lavanchy =

Swiss sprinter (born 1990)

Personal information
- Born: 4 January 1990 (age 36)
- Height: 1.70 m (5 ft 7 in)
- Weight: 58 kg (128 lb)

Sport
- Country: Switzerland
- Sport: Track and field
- Event: 100 metres
- Club: LC Zürich
- Coached by: Laurent Meuwly

Marisa Lavanchy (born 4 January 1990) is a Swiss sprinter. She competed in the 4 × 100 meters relay at the 2013 and 2015 World Championships without qualifying for the final.

== International competitions ==
Year	Competition	Venue	Position	Event	Notes
Representing Switzerland
2008	World Junior Championships	Bydgoszcz, Poland	8th	4 × 100 m relay	45.51
2009	European Junior Championships	Novi Sad, Serbia	19th (h)	100 m	12.22
2009	European Junior Championships	Novi Sad, Serbia	20th (h)	200 m	24.75
2009	European Junior Championships	Novi Sad, Serbia	5th	4 × 100 m relay	45.97
2011	European U23 Championships	Ostrava, Czech Republic	–	4 × 100 m relay	DNF
2013	World Championships	Moscow, Russia	12th (h)	4 × 100 m relay	43.21
2013	Jeux de la Francophonie	Nice, France	5th	100 m	12.02
2013	Jeux de la Francophonie	Nice, France	2nd	4 × 100 m relay	45.01
2014	IAAF World Relays	Nassau, Bahamas	3rd (B)	4 × 100 m relay	43.55
2014	European Championships	Zürich, Switzerland	28th (h)	100 m	11.65
2014	European Championships	Zürich, Switzerland	4th (h)	4 × 100 m relay	42.98^{1}
2015	IAAF World Relays	Nassau, Bahamas	8th	4 × 100 m relay	43.74
2015	World Championships	Beijing, China	13th (h)	4 × 100 m relay	43.38
2016	European Championships	Amsterdam, Netherlands	21st (h)	100 m	11.89

^{1}Did not finish in the final

== Personal bests ==
Outdoor

- 100 metres – 11.42 (+2.0 m/s, Bulle 2014)
- 200 metres – 23.39 (-0.2 m/s, Zug 2015)

Indoor

- 60 metres – 7.43 (Magglingen 2014)
- 200 metres – 23.93 (Magglingen 2013)
