= Esther Aghatise =

Nigerian long jumper

Esther Aghatise (born 15 April 1985) is a Nigerian long jumper.

== Competition record ==
Year	Competition	Venue	Position	Event	Notes
Representing the Nigeria
2002	Commonwealth Games	Manchester, United Kingdom	8th	Long jump	6.01 m
2002	World Junior Championships	Kingston, Jamaica	3rd	Long jump	6.34 m (wind: -0.2 m/s)
2003	All-Africa Games	Abuja, Nigeria	1st	Long jump	6.58 m
2003	Afro-Asian Games	Hyderabad, India	4th	Long jump	6.30 m
2006	Commonwealth Games	Melbourne, Australia	7th	Long jump	6.47 m
