= Athletics at the 2011 All-Africa Games – Women's 100 metres hurdles =

The women's 100 metres hurdles event at the 2011 All-Africa Games was held on 13 September.

== Results ==
Wind: +4.2 m/s

Rank	Name	Nationality	Time	Notes
1st place, gold medalist(s)	Seun Adigun	Nigeria	13.20	
2nd place, silver medalist(s)	Jessica Ohanaja	Nigeria	13.36	
3rd place, bronze medalist(s)	Rosa Rakotozafy	Madagascar	13.55	
4	Amina Ferguen	Algeria	13.58	
5	Rosina Amenebed	Ghana	13.74	
6	Telma Cossa	Mozambique	14.05	
7	Gnima Faye	Senegal	14.10	
8	Adja Arette Ndiaye	Senegal	14.54	
9	Silvia Panguana	Mozambique	14.54	
