= 2006 African Championships in Athletics – Women's triple jump =

The women's triple jump event at the 2006 African Championships in Athletics was held at the Stade Germain Comarmond on August 13.

== Results ==
Rank	Name	Nationality	Result	Notes
1st place, gold medalist(s)	Yamilé Aldama	Sudan	14.71w	
2nd place, silver medalist(s)	Kéné Ndoye	Senegal	14.08w	
3rd place, bronze medalist(s)	Otonye Iworima	Nigeria	13.88w	
4	Mariette Mien	Burkina Faso	13.84w	
5	Baya Rahouli	Algeria	13.47	
6	Béatrice Kamboulé	Burkina Faso	13.19w	
7	Rapitsara Volazandry	Madagascar	13.01w	
8	Yah Soucko Koïta	Mali	12.46w	
9	Maty Salame	Senegal	11.84w	
