= 2002 African Championships in Athletics – Women's 100 metres hurdles =

The women's 100 metres hurdles event at the 2002 African Championships in Athletics was held in Radès, Tunisia on August 9–10.

== Medalists ==
Gold	Silver	Bronze
Rosa Rakotozafy; Madagascar	Angela Atede; Nigeria	Kéné Ndoye; Senegal

== Results ==
=== Heats ===
Wind:
Heat 1: +0.7 m/s, Heat 2: 0.0 m/s

Rank	Heat	Name	Nationality	Time	Notes
1	2	Angela Atede	Nigeria	13.24	Q
2	2	Rosa Rakotozafy	Madagascar	13.33	Q
3	1	Naima Bentahar	Algeria	13.84	Q
4	1	Mame Tacko Diouf	Senegal	13.88	Q
5	2	Gnima Faye	Senegal	14.24	Q
6	1	Kéné Ndoye	Senegal	14.51	Q
7	2	Samira Harrouchi	Algeria	14.63	q
8	1	Christiane Yao	Ivory Coast	15.09	q
	1	Saida Rouchdi	Morocco	DNF	
	2	Hannah Cooper	Liberia	DNS	

=== Final ===
Wind: +2.5 m/s

Rank	Name	Nationality	Time	Notes
1st place, gold medalist(s)	Rosa Rakotozafy	Madagascar	13.13	
2nd place, silver medalist(s)	Angela Atede	Nigeria	13.16	
3rd place, bronze medalist(s)	Kéné Ndoye	Senegal	13.72	
4	Naima Bentahar	Algeria	13.86	
5	Gnima Faye	Senegal	14.08	
6	Samira Harrouchi	Algeria	14.45	
7	Christiane Yao	Ivory Coast	14.93	
	Mame Tacko Diouf	Senegal	DNS	
