= Michelle Griffith-Robinson =

English triple jumper (born 1971)

Michelle Robinson née Griffith
Personal information
- Nationality: British (English)
- Born: 6 October 1971 (age 54) Wembley, Greater London, England
- Height: 172 cm (5 ft 8 in)
- Weight: 65 kg (143 lb)

Sport
- Sport: Athletics
- Event: triple jump
- Club: Windsor, Slough & Eton AC

Michelle Amanda Robinson (née Griffith) (born 6 October 1971) is a retired female English triple jumper who was born in Wembley, Greater London, who competed at the 1996 Summer Olympics.

== Biography ==
Griffith became the British triple jump champion after winning the British AAA Championships title at the 1994 AAA Championships. She retained her title at the 1995 AAA Championships before finishing second to Ashia Hansen in 1996.

At the 1996 Olympic Games in Atlanta, Griffith represented Great Britain in the triple jump event.

Griffith represented England in the triple jump event at the 1998 Commonwealth Games in Kuala Lumpur, Malaysia before winning two more AAA titles in 1999 and 2000.

In 2004, Griffith won her fifth and last AAA title at the 2004 AAA Championships two years after representingd England for a second time in the triple jump at the Commonwealth Games, before appearing for a third time (under her married name, Robinson) during the 2006 Commonwealth Games.

Her personal best jump was 14.08 metres, achieved in June 1994 in Sheffield.

== International competitions ==
Year	Competition	Venue	Position	Event	Notes
Representing Great Britain and England
1990	European Indoor Championships	Glasgow, United Kingdom	7th	Triple jump	12.39 m
1992	European Indoor Championships	Genoa, Italy	14th	Triple jump	13.10 m
1993	Universiade	Buffalo, United States	4th	Triple jump	13.75 m
1993	World Championships	Stuttgart, Germany	9th	Triple jump	13.69 m
1994	European Indoor Championships	Paris, France	10th	Triple jump	13.55 m
1994	Goodwill Games	St. Petersburg, Russia	6th	Triple jump	13.49 m
1994	European Championships	Helsinki, Finland	10th	Triple jump	13.60 m
1995	World Championships	Gothenburg, Sweden	12th	Triple jump	13.59 m
1996	European Indoor Championships	Stockholm, Sweden	22nd (q)	Triple jump	12.36 m
1996	Olympic Games	Atlanta, United States	18th (q)	Triple jump	13.70 m
1997	World Championships	Athens, Greece	25th (q)	Triple jump	13.67 m
1998	Commonwealth Games	Kuala Lumpur, Malaysia	6th	Triple jump	13.77 m
2002	Commonwealth Games	Manchester, United Kingdom	8th	Triple jump	12.90 m
2006	Commonwealth Games	Melbourne, Australia	7th	Triple jump	12.80 m
