= Lindsay Lindley =

American-born Nigerian sprinter (born 1989)

Personal information
- Full name: Lindsay Weyinmi Lindley
- Born: Lindsay Rowe; 10 June 1989 (age 37) Manhattan, New York City, U.S.
- Height: 5 ft (152 cm)

Sport
- Country: Nigeria
- Sport: Athletics
- Event: 100m hurdles
- College team: UCLA Bruins

Achievements and titles
- Personal best: 100mH: 12.90 s (2017) 60mH: 8.04 s (2018)
Medal record
Women's Athletics
Representing Nigeria
2015 All-Africa Games
| Bronze medal – third place | 2015 Brazzaville | 100 m Hurdles |
- Updated on 9 March 2018

Lindsay Lindley (born 10 June 1989) is an American-born Nigerian sprinter who specializes in the 100m hurdles. She represented Nigeria at the 2015 World Championships in Athletics after she was selected by the Athletics Federation of Nigeria. In 2015, she claimed bronze in the 100 metres hurdles event at the 2015 All-Africa Games.

== Competition record ==
| Year | Competition | Venue | Position | Event | Notes |
Representing Nigeria
| 2014 | African Championships | Marrakesh, Morocco | 4th | 100 m hurdles | 13.43 |
| 2015 | World Championships | Beijing, China | 31st (h) | 100 m hurdles | 13.30 |
| 2015 | African Games | Brazzaville, Republic of the Congo | 3rd | 100 m hurdles | 13.30 |
| 2017 | IAAF World Relays | Nassau, Bahamas | 11th (h) | 4 × 100 m relay | 44.95 |
| 2017 | World Championships | London, United Kingdom | 20th (sf) | 100 m hurdles | 13.18 |
| 2018 | World Indoor Championships | Birmingham, United Kingdom | 13th (sf) | 60 m hurdles | 8.08 |
