= Nichole Denby =

American-Nigerian hurdler

Personal information
- Nationality: United States; Nigeria
- Born: 10 October 1982 (age 43) Norman, Oklahoma, United States

Sport
- Sport: Athletics
- Event: 100 m hurdles
Medal record
Women's athletics
Representing Nigeria
African Championships
Bronze medal – third place	2014 Marrakesh	100 m hurdles
- Updated on 27 August 2016

Nichole Denby (born 10 October 1982) is an American-Nigerian track and field athlete who specializes in the 100 meters hurdles. She represented the United States at the 2007 World Championships narrowly missing the final.

In 2014, she switched her allegiance to Nigeria, competing for the new nation at the 2014 Commonwealth Games, as well as 2014 African Championships where she won her first medal for Nigeria.

She has had personal bests of 12.54 seconds in the 100 metres hurdles (Eugene 2008) and 7.93 in the 60 metres hurdles (Boston 2007).

While running for North High School in Riverside, California, she was the 1999 and 2000 CIF California State Meet Champion in the 100 meters hurdles. Her 13.20 win in 2000 set the National High School Record at the time.

Representing the Texas Longhorns women's track and field team, Denby won the 2004 NCAA Division I Outdoor Track and Field Championships in the 100 m hurdles.

== Competition record ==
Year	Competition	Venue	Position	Event	Notes
Representing the United States
1999	Pan American Junior Championships	Tampa, United States	2nd	100 m hurdles	13.82
2007	World Championships	Osaka, Japan	9th (sf)	100 m hurdles	12.80
Representing Nigeria
2014	Commonwealth Games	Glasgow, United Kingdom	12th (h)	100 m hurdles	13.54
2014	African Championships	Marrakesh, Morocco	3rd	100 m hurdles	13.27

== Exhibition races ==
Year	Competition	Venue	Position	Event	Notes
2015	Phil Springer (Head-to-head)	Austin, United States	1st	100 m sprint	Untimed
