= 2004 African Championships in Athletics – Women's 100 metres hurdles =

The women's 100 metres hurdles event at the 2004 African Championships in Athletics was held in Brazzaville, Republic of the Congo on July 18.

== Results ==
Wind: -0.7 m/s

Rank	Name	Nationality	Time	Notes
1st place, gold medalist(s)	Rosa Rakotozafy	Madagascar	13.73	
2nd place, silver medalist(s)	Carole Kaboud Mebam	Cameroon	14.07	
3rd place, bronze medalist(s)	Alima Soura	Burkina Faso	14.38	
4	Telma Cossa	Mozambique	14.43	NR
5	Soléne Eboulabeka	Republic of the Congo	15.51	
	Gnima Faye	Senegal	DQ	
