= 2010 African Championships in Athletics – Women's triple jump =

The women's triple jump at the 2010 African Championships in Athletics was held on August 1.

== Results ==
Rank	Athlete	Nationality	#1	#2	#3	#4	#5	#6	Result	Notes
1st place, gold medalist(s)	Sarah Nambawa	Uganda	13.33	13.95	–	–	–	–	13.95	NR
2nd place, silver medalist(s)	Nkiruka Domike	Nigeria	13.45	X	X	13.60	X	13.71	13.71	SB
3rd place, bronze medalist(s)	Otonye Iworima	Nigeria	X	13.50	13.27	13.33	13.57	13.65	13.65	SB
4	Baya Rahouli	Algeria	13.21	13.00	13.38	X	13.34	13.64	13.64	
5	Worokia Sanou	Burkina Faso	X	12.74	13.40	12.79	X	X	13.40	PB
6	Jamaa Chnaik	Morocco	12.86	13.30	13.19	13.29	13.38	X	13.38	
7	Blessing Ibrahim	Nigeria	13.30	12.68	13.07	12.95	12.66	12.96	13.30	SB
8	Rapitsara Volazandry	Madagascar	12.77	12.97	12.85	12.56	12.91	12.54	12.97	
9	Cindy Peters	South Africa	X	12.76	12.77				12.77	
10	Sandrine Mbumi	Cameroon	12.67	X	12.52				12.67	
11	Janet Boniface	Seychelles	11.93	11.67	11.68				11.93	
12	Margaret Indany	Kenya	11.27	X	X				11.27	
13	Netsanet Haddis	Ethiopia	X	11.11	X				11.11	
	Elzeba Kemboi	Kenya	X	X	X				NM	
	Gladys Musyoki	Kenya	X	X	X				NM	
	Zeiba Zeine	Ethiopia	X	X	X				NM	
	Françoise Mbango Etone	Cameroon							DNS	
