= Rosvitha Okou =

Ivorian hurdler (born 1986)

Personal information
- Nationality: Ivory Coast
- Born: 5 September 1986 (age 39) Gagnoa, Ivory Coast
- Height: 1.65 m (5 ft 5 in)
- Weight: 62 kg (137 lb)

Sport
- Sport: Athletics
- Event: 100 m hurdles
Medal record
Women's athletics
Representing Ivory Coast
African Championships
Silver medal – second place	2014 Marrakesh	100 m hurdles
Silver medal – second place	2018 Asaba	4×100 m
Bronze medal – third place	2018 Asaba	100 m hurdles
- Updated on 27 August 2016

Bodjiho Rosvitha Okou (born 5 September 1986) is an Ivorian hurdler. At the 2012 Summer Olympics, she competed in the Women's 100 metres hurdles without reaching the semifinals. In addition, she won a silver medal at the 2014 African Championships. Until 2012 she represented France.

Her personal bests are 13.13 seconds in the 100 metres hurdles (+0.1 m/s, La Roche-sur-Yon 2011) and 8.17 seconds in the 60 metres hurdles (Mondeville 2014). Both are current national records.

== International competitions ==
Year	Competition	Venue	Position	Event	Notes
Representing France
2005	European Junior Championships	Kaunas, Lithuania	24th (h)	100 m hurdles	14.89
Representing Ivory Coast
2012	African Championships	Porto-Novo, Benin	6th	100 m hurdles	13.74
2012	Olympic Games	London, United Kingdom	36th (h)	100 m hurdles	13.62
2013	Jeux de la Francophonie	Nice, France	5th	100 m hurdles	13.69
2013	Jeux de la Francophonie	Nice, France	5th	4 × 100 m relay	45.84
2014	African Championships	Marrakesh, Morocco	2nd	100 m hurdles	13.26
2015	African Games	Brazzaville, Republic of the Congo	4th	100 m hurdles	13.32
2015	African Games	Brazzaville, Republic of the Congo	3rd	4 × 100 m relay	43.98
2017	Jeux de la Francophonie	Abidjan, Ivory Coast	4th	100 m hurdles	13.59
2018	African Championships	Asaba, Nigeria	3rd	100 m hurdles	13.39
2018	African Championships	Asaba, Nigeria	2nd	4 × 100 m relay	44.40
2019	African Games	Rabat, Morocco	5th	100 m hurdles	13.72
