= 2010 African Championships in Athletics – Women's 100 metres hurdles =

The women's 100 metres hurdles at the 2010 African Championships in Athletics were held on July 28–29.

== Medalists ==
Gold	Silver	Bronze
Seun Adigun; Nigeria	Gnima Faye; Senegal	Amina Ferguen; Algeria

== Results ==
=== Heats ===
Qualification: First 3 of each heat (Q) and the next 2 fastest (q) qualified for the final.

Rank	Heat	Name	Nationality	Time	Notes
1	2	Gnima Faye	Senegal	13.58	Q
2	1	Seun Adigun	Nigeria	13.59	Q
3	1	Beatrice Kambole	Burkina Faso	13.73	Q, SB
4	2	Carole Made Kaboud Mebam	Cameroon	13.78	Q
5	2	Amina Ferguen	Algeria	13.83	Q
6	1	Rosina Amenebede	Ghana	14.08	Q, PB
7	2	Florence Wasike	Kenya	14.33	q, SB
8	1	Alyma Soura	Burkina Faso	14.35	q
9	2	Telma Cossa	Mozambique	14.77	
10	1	Maureen Jelagat Maiyo	Kenya	15.02	SB
11	1	Jentricks Nelima	Kenya	15.88	
12	2	Tigest Getent	Ethiopia	16.35	

=== Final ===
Wind: +0.20 m/s

Rank	Lane	Name	Nationality	Time	Notes
1st place, gold medalist(s)	5	Seun Adigun	Nigeria	13.14	SB
2nd place, silver medalist(s)	4	Gnima Faye	Senegal	13.67	
3rd place, bronze medalist(s)	3	Amina Ferguen	Algeria	13.87	
4	2	Alyma Soura	Burkina Faso	14.02	
5	6	Carole Made Kaboud Mebam	Cameroon	14.16	
6	1	Florence Wasike	Kenya	14.21	NR
	8	Rosina Amenebede	Ghana	DQ	
	3	Beatrice Kambole	Burkina Faso	DNF	
