= Athletics at the 2015 African Games – Women's 100 metres hurdles =

The women's 100 metres hurdles event at the 2015 African Games was held on 13 and 14 September.

== Medalists ==
Gold	Silver	Bronze
Oluwatobiloba Amusan; Nigeria	Gnima Faye; Senegal	Lindsay Lindley; Nigeria

== Results ==
=== Heats ===
Qualification: First 3 in each heat (Q) and the next 2 fastest (q) advanced to the final.

Wind:
Heat 1: +0.2 m/s, Heat 2: 0.0 m/s

Rank	Heat	Name	Nationality	Time	Notes
1	2	Oluwatobiloba Amusan	Nigeria	13.11	Q
2	1	Gnima Faye	Senegal	13.35	Q, SB
3	1	Roswita Okou	Ivory Coast	13.35	Q
4	1	Lindsay Lindley	Nigeria	13.38	Q
5	1	Claudia Heunis	South Africa	13.54	q
6	1	Rahamatou Dramé	Mali	13.93	q
7	2	Elizabeth Dadzie	Ghana	13.94	Q
8	2	Priscillah Tabunda	Kenya	14.12	Q, SB
9	1	Silvia Panguana	Mozambique	14.58	
10	2	Elche Limbonanga	Republic of the Congo	15.22	SB
11	2	Jessica Mané	Mauritius	15.33	
12	2	Konjet Teshome	Ethiopia	15.37	
	1	Caroline Waiganjo	Kenya	DNF	
	1	Esther Sheriff	Sierra Leone	DNS	
	2	Marthe Koala	Burkina Faso	DNS	

=== Final ===
Wind: -0.1 m/s

Rank	Lane	Name	Nationality	Time	Notes
1st place, gold medalist(s)	5	Oluwatobiloba Amusan	Nigeria	13.15	
2nd place, silver medalist(s)	6	Gnima Faye	Senegal	13.28	SB
3rd place, bronze medalist(s)	9	Lindsay Lindley	Nigeria	13.30	
4	7	Roswita Okou	Ivory Coast	13.32	
5	2	Claudia Heunis	South Africa	13.45	
6	4	Elizabeth Dadzie	Ghana	13.60	
	3	Rahamatou Dramé	Mali	DNS	
	8	Priscillah Tabunda	Kenya	DNS	
