= 2014 African Championships in Athletics – Women's 100 metres hurdles =

The women's 100 metres hurdles event at the 2014 African Championships in Athletics was held August 10–11 on Stade de Marrakech.

== Medalists ==
Gold	Silver	Bronze
Rikenette Steenkamp; South Africa	Rosvitha Okou; Ivory Coast	Nichole Denby; Nigeria

== Results ==
=== Heats ===
Qualification: First 3 of each heat (Q) and the next 2 fastest (q) qualified for the final.

Wind: Heat 1: -1.2 m/s, Heat 2: -1.2 m/s

Rank	Heat	Name	Nationality	Time	Notes
1	2	Rosvitha Okou	Ivory Coast	13.18	Q
2	1	Nichole Denby	Nigeria	13.20	Q
3	2	Lindsay Lindley	Nigeria	13.39	Q
4	1	Gnima Faye	Senegal	13.45	Q
5	1	Rikenette Steenkamp	South Africa	13.47	Q
6	2	Adja Arette Ndiaye	Senegal	13.61	Q
7	1	Rahamatou Dramé	Mali	13.95	q
8	2	Witney Barata	Angola	14.30	q
9	2	Rashidatu Abubakar	Ghana	14.37	
10	1	Samar Ezzina	Tunisia	14.37	
11	2	Lamiae Lhabze	Morocco	14.59	
12	1	Brigitte Ekongolo Nguea	Cameroon	14.90	
13	2	Etean Gebremichel	Ethiopia	15.45	

=== Final ===
Wind: +0.1 m/s

Rank	Lane	Name	Nationality	Time	Notes
1st place, gold medalist(s)	7	Rikenette Steenkamp	South Africa	13.26	
2nd place, silver medalist(s)	3	Rosvitha Okou	Ivory Coast	13.26	
3rd place, bronze medalist(s)	5	Nichole Denby	Nigeria	13.27	
4	4	Lindsay Lindley	Nigeria	13.43	
5	6	Gnima Faye	Senegal	13.49	
6	8	Adja Arette Ndiaye	Senegal	13.60	
7	1	Witney Barata	Angola	14.56	
	1	Rahamatou Dramé	Mali	DNF	
