= Athletics at the 2003 All-Africa Games – Women's 100 metres hurdles =

The women's 100 metres hurdles at the 2003 All-Africa Games were held on October 14–15.

== Medalists ==
Gold	Silver	Bronze
Angela Atede; Nigeria	Damaris Agbugba; Nigeria	Christy Akinremi; Nigeria

== Results ==
=== Heats ===
Qualification: First 3 of each heat (Q) and the next 2 fastest (q) qualified for the semifinal.

Wind:
Heat 1: +0.2 m/s, Heat 2: +0.2 m/s

Rank	Heat	Name	Nationality	Time	Notes
1	1	Angela Atede	Nigeria	13.17	Q
1	2	Damaris Agbugba	Nigeria	13.17	Q
3	2	Christy Akinremi	Nigeria	13.38	Q
4	2	Gnima Faye	Senegal	13.64	Q
5	2	Maria-Joëlle Conjungo	Central African Republic	13.67	q
6	1	Carole Kaboud Mebam	Cameroon	14.00	Q
7	2	Aïssata Soulama	Burkina Faso	14.44	q
8	1	Salhate Djamaldine	Comoros	14.72	Q
9	2	Djamilata Sekou	Togo	17.42	
	1	Naima Bentahar	Algeria	DNF	

=== Final ===
Wind: -1.5 m/s

Rank	Name	Nationality	Time	Notes
1st place, gold medalist(s)	Angela Atede	Nigeria	13.01	
2nd place, silver medalist(s)	Damaris Agbugba	Nigeria	13.06	
3rd place, bronze medalist(s)	Christy Akinremi	Nigeria	13.55	
4	Maria-Joëlle Conjungo	Central African Republic	13.71	
5	Aïssata Soulama	Burkina Faso	14.42	
6	Salhate Djamaldine	Comoros	14.77	
7	Gnima Faye	Senegal	14.80	
	Carole Kaboud Mebam	Cameroon	DNF	
