= Tanja König =

German triple jumper

Personal information
- Born: 11 April 1970 (age 56)

Sport
- Sport: Track and field

Tanja König, née Borrmann (born 11 April 1970) is a retired German triple jumper.

She finished 21st at the 1992 European Indoor Championships, seventh at the 1993 Summer Universiade and twelfth at the 1994 European Indoor Championships. She competed at the 1995 World Indoor Championships without reaching the final.

She became German champion in 2000, and earlier won the silver medal in 1992 and the bronze medal in 1998. She represented the club Bayer Leverkusen. She became German indoor champion in 2000 and won three other medals between 1993 and 2004.

Her personal best jump was 13.96 metres, achieved in June 2000 in Wesel. Indoors she achieved 14.03 metres in February 1994 in Dortmund.
