= Gnima Faye =

Senegalese hurdler (born 1984)

Medal record

Women's athletics

Representing Senegal

African Games
| Silver medal – second place | 2015 Brazzaville | 100 m hurdles |

African Championships
| Gold medal – first place | 2012 Porto-Novo | 100 m hurdles |
| Silver medal – second place | 2010 Nairobi | 100 m hurdles |
| Bronze medal – third place | 2006 Bambous | 100 m hurdles |

Gnima Faye (born 17 November 1984) is a Senegalese track and field athlete who competes in the 100 metres hurdles. She was the 2012 African champion in the event and has a personal best of 13.17 seconds.

She competed in the 200 metres at the 2001 World Youth Championships in Athletics, then switched to the hurdles for the 2002 World Junior Championships in Athletics. At the age of seventeen she placed fifth in the 100 m hurdles at the 2002 African Championships in Athletics. She ran a personal best of 13.59 seconds to win at the 2003 African Junior Athletics Championships and also placed second in the 400 metres hurdles as well as helping Senegal to third in the 4×100 metres relay.

Faye entered the 2004 African Championships but was disqualified. Her senior breakthrough came at the 2006 event, where she took the hurdles bronze medal and was part of the fourth-placed Senegalese relay team. She placed fifth at the 2007 All-Africa Games and was fourth in the relay, but time-wise she remained off her junior peaks. She finally bettered her 2003 personal best in the 2009 season and she ended that year with a high at the 2009 Jeux de la Francophonie by taking the silver medal in a personal best of 13.35 seconds.

She was runner-up to Seun Adigun at the 2010 African Championships. Faye won at the CAA Brazzaville and Gabriel Tiacoh meets that year and had a season's best of 13.45 seconds in La Chaux-de-Fonds. She was elected as Africa's hurdles representative for the 2010 IAAF Continental Cup and she came seventh. She was based mainly in France in 2011 and she broke the Senegalese record for the 60 metres hurdles with a run of 8.22 seconds. She ran at the 2011 All-Africa Games but only finished seventh. Her switch to France paid off in 2012, as she opened her outdoor season with a personal best of 13.33 seconds, then bettered that with a run of 13.17 seconds at the French Athletics Championships. At the 2012 African Championships the defending champion Adigun slipped, enabling Faye to take the lead and win her first continental hurdles title.

== Competition record ==
| Year | Competition | Venue | Position | Event | Notes |
Representing Senegal
| 2001 | World Youth Championships | Debrecen, Hungary | 48th (h) | 200 m | 26.83 |
| 2001 | World Youth Championships | Debrecen, Hungary | 20th (h) | Medley relay | 2:25.40 |
| 2002 | World Junior Championships | Kingston, Jamaica | 23rd (h) | 100 m hurdles | 15.07 |
| 2002 | World Junior Championships | Kingston, Jamaica | 10th (h) | 4 × 100 m relay | 47.55 |
| 2002 | World Junior Championships | Kingston, Jamaica | 8th (h) | 4 × 400 m relay | 3:57.13 (Note: Did not start in the final) |
| 2002 | African Championships | Radès, Tunisia | 5th | 100 m hurdles | 14.08 |
| 2002 | African Championships | Radès, Tunisia | – | 4 × 100 m relay | DQ |
| 2003 | African Junior Championships | Garoua, Cameroon | 1st | 100 m hurdles | 13.59 |
| 2003 | African Junior Championships | Garoua, Cameroon | 2nd | 400 m hurdles | 62.32 |
| 2003 | African Junior Championships | Garoua, Cameroon | 3rd | 4 × 100 m relay | 46.84 |
| 2003 | All-Africa Games | Abuja, Nigeria | 7th | 100 m hurdles | 14.80 |
| 2004 | African Championships | Brazzaville, Republic of the Congo | – | 100 m hurdles | DQ |
| 2006 | African Championships | Bambous, Mauritius | 3rd | 100 m hurdles | 13.95 |
| 2006 | African Championships | Bambous, Mauritius | 4th | 4 × 100 m relay | 47.22 |
| 2007 | All-Africa Games | Algiers, Algeria | 5th | 100 m hurdles | 13.85 |
| 2007 | All-Africa Games | Algiers, Algeria | 4th | 4 × 100 m relay | 45.26 |
| 2009 | Jeux de la Francophonie | Beirut, Lebanon | 2nd | 100 m hurdles | 13.35 |
| 2010 | African Championships | Nairobi, Kenya | 2nd | 100 m hurdles | 13.67 |
| 2010 | Continental Cup | Split, Croatia | 7th | 100 m hurdles | 13.58 (Note: Representing Africa) |
| 2011 | All-Africa Games | Maputo, Mozambique | 7th | 100 m hurdles | 14.10 |
| 2012 | African Championships | Porto-Novo, Benin | 1st | 100 m hurdles | 13.36 |
| 2013 | World Championships | Moscow, Russia | 33rd (h) | 100 m hurdles | 13.66 |
| 2013 | Jeux de la Francophonie | Nice, France | 2nd | 100 m hurdles | 13.47 |
| 2014 | World Indoor Championships | Sopot, Poland | 19th (h) | 60 m hurdles | 8.15 |
| 2014 | African Championships | Marrakesh, Morocco | 5th | 100 m hurdles | 13.49 |
| 2015 | African Games | Brazzaville, Republic of the Congo | 2nd | 100 m hurdles | 13.28 |
| 2016 | African Championships | Durban, South Africa | 5th | 100 m hurdles | 13.63 |
| 2018 | African Championships | Asaba, Nigeria | – | 100 m hurdles | DNF |
