= 2008 African Championships in Athletics – Women's triple jump =

The men's triple jump event at the 2008 African Championships in Athletics was held at the Addis Ababa Stadium on May 1.

== Results ==
| Rank | Athlete | Nationality | #1 | #2 | #3 | #4 | #5 | #6 | Result | Notes |
|---|---|---|---|---|---|---|---|---|---|---|
| 1st place, gold medalist(s) | Françoise Mbango Etone | Cameroon | 14.61 | 14.38 | 14.58 | 14.76 | 14.65 | 14.52 | 14.76 | |
| 2nd place, silver medalist(s) | Yamilé Aldama | Sudan | x | 13.97 | 14.36 | x | 14.04 | 14.20 | 14.36 | |
| 3rd place, bronze medalist(s) | Chinonye Ohadugha | Nigeria | 13.98 | 14.14 | 14.04 | – | – | – | 14.14 | |
| 4 | Camélia Sahnoune | Algeria | 13.61 | 13.57 | 13.87 | x | 13.63 | 13.63 | 13.87 | |
| 5 | Falude Tolumani | Nigeria | 13.39 | 13.39 | x | x | x | 12.10 | 13.39 | |
| 6 | Otonye Iworima | Nigeria | 13.33 | 13.38 | 13.34 | 13.30 | 13.24 | 13.22 | 13.38 | |
| 7 | Kadidia Soura | Burkina Faso | 12.19 | 12.66 | 12.54 | 12.84 | 12.60 | 12.81 | 12.84 | |
| 8 | Nana Blakime | Togo | 12.14 | 12.48 | 12.60 | 12.55 | 12.11 | x | 12.60 | |
| 9 | Fatima Ouchdih | Morocco | 12.57 | 12.58 | 12.44 | | | | 12.58 | |
| 10 | Enas Gharib | Egypt | 12.16 | x | 12.06 | | | | 12.16 | |
| 11 | Zeyba Zeyeni | Ethiopia | x | 10.81 | x | | | | 10.81 | |
| | Pamela Mouele-Mboussi | Republic of the Congo | | | | | | | DNS | |
| | Emebet Tilahun | Ethiopia | | | | | | | DNS | |
| | Fatima Zahra Dkouk | Morocco | | | | | | | DNS | |
