= Athletics at the 2007 All-Africa Games – Women's triple jump =

The women's triple jump at the 2007 All-Africa Games was held on July 18.

== Results ==
Rank	Athlete	Nationality	Result	Notes
1st place, gold medalist(s)	Yamilé Aldama	Sudan	14.46	
2nd place, silver medalist(s)	Chinonye Ohadugha	Nigeria	14.21	
3rd place, bronze medalist(s)	Otonye Iworima	Nigeria	13.83	
4	Blessing Okagbare	Nigeria	13.77	
5	Camélia Sahnoune	Algeria	13.32	
6	Rapitsara Volazandry	Madagascar	13.12	
7	Béatrice Kamboulé	Burkina Faso	13.05	
8	Nana Blakime	Togo	12.21	
9	Pamela Mouele Mboussi	Republic of the Congo	11.87	
	Françoise Mbango	Cameroon	DNS	
