= Gladys Musyoki =

Kenyan athlete (born 1994)

Personal information
- Born: 30 November 1994 (age 31) Machakos, Kenya
- Height: 1.70 m (5 ft 7 in)
- Weight: 70 kg (154 lb)

Sport
- Sport: Athletics
- Event(s): 200 m, 400 m, long jump

Gladys Musyoki (born 30 November 1994) is a Kenyan long jumper turned sprinter. She represented her country at two consecutive Commonwealth Games, starting in 2014.

== International competitions ==
Year	Competition	Venue	Position	Event	Notes
Representing Kenya
2010	African Championships	Nairobi, Kenya	–	Triple jump	NM
2014	Commonwealth Games	Glasgow, United Kingdom	20th (q)	Long jump	6.04 m
2014	African Championships	Marrakesh, Morocco	8th	Long jump	6.09 m
2018	Commonwealth Games	Gold Coast, Australia	31st (h)	200 m	24.94
2018	Commonwealth Games	Gold Coast, Australia	21st (sf)	400 m	54.40
2019	World Relays	Yokohama, Japan	8th (B)	4 × 400 m relay	3:43.01
2021	World Relays	Chorzów, Poland	13th (h)	4 × 400 m relay	3:39.34

== Personal bests ==
Outdoor

- 200 metres – 24.79 (Nairobi 2018)
- 400 metres – 53.41 (Gold Coast 2018)
- Long jump – 6.17 (Nairobi 2014)
- Triple jump – 12.98 (Nairobi 2014)
