= Otonye Iworima =

Nigerian triple jumper (born 1976)

Personal information
- Born: 13 April 1976 (age 50) Nigeria
- Occupations: Triple and long jump athlete

Sport
- Sport: Track and field
Medal record
Women's athletics
Representing Nigeria
All-Africa Games
Bronze medal – third place	2011 Maputo	Triple jump
African Championships
Bronze medal – third place	2006 Bambous	Triple jump
Bronze medal – third place	2010 Nairobi	Triple jump

Otonye Iworima (born 13 April 1976) is a Nigerian long jumper and triple jumper. She attended Queens College Lagos for her secondary education and the University of Nsukka for her undergraduate studies where she gained a degree in Applied Art. She also attended the International Academy of Sport Science and Technology in Lausanne, Switzerland.

In 2006, she finished second at the Commonwealth Games and third at the African Championships. For these achievements the Athletics Federation of Nigeria awarded her as the Nigerian Female Athlete of the Year. In 2007, Iworima won another bronze medal, at the All-Africa Games.

== Achievements ==
Year	Competition	Venue	Position	Event	Notes
Representing Nigeria
2006	Commonwealth Games	Melbourne, Australia	2nd	Triple jump	13.53 m
2006	African Championships	Bambous, Mauritius	3rd	Triple jump	13.88 m (w)
2007	All-Africa Games	Algiers, Algeria	3rd	Triple jump	13.83 m
2008	African Championships	Addis Ababa, Ethiopia	11th	Long jump	5.83 m (w)
2008	African Championships	Addis Ababa, Ethiopia	6th	Triple jump	13.38 m
2010	African Championships	Nairobi, Kenya	3rd	Triple jump	13.65 m
2010	Commonwealth Games	Delhi, India	9th	Triple jump	13.21 m
2011	All-Africa Games	Maputo, Mozambique	3rd	Triple jump	13.53 m
