= Athletics at the 2003 All-Africa Games – Women's long jump =

The women's long jump event at the 2003 All-Africa Games was held on October 14.

== Results ==
Rank	Name	Nationality	Result	Notes
1st place, gold medalist(s)	Esther Aghatise	Nigeria	6.58	
2nd place, silver medalist(s)	Grace Umelo	Nigeria	6.56	
3rd place, bronze medalist(s)	Chinedu Odozor	Nigeria	6.52	
4	Kéné Ndoye	Senegal	6.37	
5	Kadiatou Camara	Mali	6.18	
6	Yah Koïta	Mali	6.16	
7	Georgina Sowah	Ghana	6.16	
8	Hellen Chemtai	Kenya	6.00	
