= Athletics at the 2002 Commonwealth Games – Women's triple jump =

Women's triple jump at the Commonwealth Games

The women's triple jump event at the 2002 Commonwealth Games was held on 31 July.

== Results ==
=== Final ===
Rank	Athlete	Nationality	#1	#2	#3	#4	#5	#6	Result	Notes
1st place, gold medalist(s)	Ashia Hansen	England	14.49	14.66	x	14.10	x	14.86	14.86	GR
2nd place, silver medalist(s)	Françoise Mbango Etone	Cameroon	14.15	14.16	14.34	x	14.61	14.82	14.82	NR
3rd place, bronze medalist(s)	Trecia Smith	Jamaica	14.32	14.13	13.79	13.99	x	–	14.32	NR
4	Suzette Lee	Jamaica	13.08	13.48	13.31	x	13.54	13.46	13.54	
5	Althea Williams	Canada	12.92	x	x	13.25	12.89	12.87	13.25	
6	Nicole Mladenis	Australia	12.47	13.04	12.65	12.71	11.33	11.56	13.04	
7	Taneisha Robinson-Scanlon	England	x	x	12.98	12.83	12.93	12.86	12.98	PB
8	Michelle Griffith	England	12.52	12.89	12.90	12.79	x	x	12.90	
9	Salamatu Alimi	Nigeria	12.31	12.36	12.46				12.46	
10	Grace Efago	Nigeria	12.34	12.18	12.30				12.34	
11	Melesia Mafile'O	Tonga	x	11.72	11.79				11.79	
	Kaitinano Mwemweata	Kiribati							DNS	
