= Rikenette Steenkamp =

South African hurdler (born 1992)

Medal record

Women's athletics

Representing South Africa

African Championships
| Gold medal – first place | 2014 Marrakesh | 100 m hurdles |
| Silver medal – second place | 2018 Asaba | 100 m hurdles |

Rikenette Steenkamp (born 16 October 1992) is a South African track and field athlete who competes in the 100 metres hurdles. Her personal best is 12.81 seconds, set in 2018. She ran a time of 13.16 while winning the gold medal at the 2014 African Championships in Athletics. She represented Africa at the 2014 IAAF Continental Cup, taking fifth, and competed for South Africa at the 2009 World Youth Championships in Athletics.

She attended Hoërskool Menlopark before going on to study sports science at the University of Pretoria. Steenkamp missed the 2015 season as a result of a hamstring injury.

She is a three-time national champion of the South African Athletics Championships.

== International competitions ==
| Year | Competition | Venue | Position | Event | Notes |
|---|---|---|---|---|---|
| 2009 | World Youth Championships | Bressanone, Italy | 8th (sf) | 100 m hurdles (76.2 cm) | 13.61 |
| 2014 | African Championships | Marrakesh, Morocco | 1st | 100 m hurdles | 13.26 |
| 2014 | IAAF Continental Cup | Marrakesh, Morocco | 5th | 100 m hurdles | 13.16^{1} |
| 2018 | African Championships | Asaba, Nigeria | 2nd | 100 m hurdles | 13.18 |
| 2019 | World Championships | Doha, Qatar | 16th (sf) | 100 m hurdles | 12.96 |

^{1}Representing Africa
