= Athletics at the 2002 Commonwealth Games – Women's long jump =

Women's long jump at the Commonwealth Games

The women's long jump event at the 2002 Commonwealth Games was held on 28–29 July.

== Medalists ==
Gold	Silver	Bronze
Elva Goulbourne; Jamaica	Jade Johnson; England	Anju Bobby George; India

== Results ==
=== Qualification ===
Qualification: 6.55 m (Q) or at least 12 best (q) qualified for the final.

Rank	Group	Athlete	Nationality	#1	#2	#3	Result	Notes
1	B	Jade Johnson	England	6.65			6.65	Q
2	A	Bronwyn Thompson	Australia	6.47	x	6.14	6.47	q
3	A	Anju Bobby George	India	6.13	6.29	6.36	6.36	q
4	A	Jackie Edwards	Bahamas	x	6.18	6.35	6.35	q
5	B	Chinedu Odozor	Nigeria	6.05	6.35	6.17	6.35	q
6	B	Chantal Brunner	New Zealand	6.34	6.25	x	6.34	q
7	B	Elva Goulbourne	Jamaica	6.25	6.26	6.23	6.26	q
8	A	Ruth Irving	Scotland	6.20	6.12	6.15	6.20	q
9	B	Irene Charalambous	Cyprus	5.92	5.89	6.12	6.12	q
10	A	Ann Danson	England	x	6.09	5.92	6.09	q
11	A	Esther Aghatise	Nigeria	5.80	6.08	5.98	6.08	q
12	B	Sarah Claxton	England	x	6.08	x	6.08	q
13	A	Nayanthi Chandrasena	Sri Lanka	x	x	5.93	5.93	
14	B	Kimberley Goodall	Guernsey	5.54	5.43	5.35	5.54	
15	B	Selloane Tsoaeli	Lesotho	5.49	5.26	5.09	5.49	PB
16	A	Desiree Cocks	Anguilla	5.02	x	x	5.02	
17	B	Kaitinano Mwemweata	Kiribati	3.52	4.19	3.98	4.19	SB
	A	Françoise Mbango Etone	Cameroon				DNS	

=== Final ===
Rank	Athlete	Nationality	#1	#2	#3	#4	#5	#6	Result	Notes
1st place, gold medalist(s)	Elva Goulbourne	Jamaica	6.40	6.45	6.16	6.70	6.34	6.55	6.70	
2nd place, silver medalist(s)	Jade Johnson	England	6.55	6.50	x	6.58	6.54	x	6.58	
3rd place, bronze medalist(s)	Anju Bobby George	India	6.31	x	6.29	6.33	6.33	6.49	6.49	
4	Chinedu Odozor	Nigeria	6.38	6.11	6.39	5.99	6.15	6.17	6.39	
5	Chantal Brunner	New Zealand	6.31	x	6.32	6.39	6.29	6.20	6.39	
6	Bronwyn Thompson	Australia	x	6.09	6.25	6.28	6.38	6.19	6.38	
7	Jackie Edwards	Bahamas	6.16	6.15	6.14	4.78	6.09	6.19	6.19	
8	Esther Aghatise	Nigeria	6.01	5.78	4.84	5.77	5.80	5.78	6.01	
9	Ruth Irving	Scotland	5.93	5.95	5.98				5.98	
10	Irene Charalambous	Cyprus	x	5.91	x				5.91	
11	Ann Danson	England	5.88	5.85	5.80				5.88	
12	Sarah Claxton	England	x	x	5.77				5.77	
