= 2006 African Championships in Athletics – Women's 100 metres hurdles =

The women's 100 metres hurdles event at the 2006 African Championships in Athletics was held at the Stade Germain Comarmond on August 10.

== Results ==
Wind: -1.4 m/s

Rank	Lane	Name	Nationality	Time	Notes
1st place, gold medalist(s)	8	Olutoyin Augustus	Nigeria	13.44	
2nd place, silver medalist(s)	5	Carole Kaboud Mebam	Cameroon	13.85	
3rd place, bronze medalist(s)	2	Gnima Faye	Senegal	13.95	
4	3	Alyma Soura	Burkina Faso	14.27	
5	7	Rosina Amenebede	Ghana	14.48	
6	6	Telma Cossa	Mozambique	14.62	
7	4	Aurélie Fortes	Senegal	14.75	
