= 2018 African Championships in Athletics – Women's 100 metres hurdles =

Athletics event

The women's 100 metres hurdles event at the 2018 African Championships in Athletics was held on 2 August in Asaba, Nigeria.

== Medalists ==
| Gold | Silver | Bronze |
|---|---|---|
| Tobi Amusan; Nigeria | Rikenette Steenkamp; South Africa | Rosvitha Okou; Ivory Coast |

== Results ==
=== Heats ===
Qualification: First 3 of each heat (Q) and the next 2 fastest (q) qualified for the final.

Wind:
Heat 1: -0.7 m/s, Heat 2: -1.0 m/s

| Rank | Heat | Name | Nationality | Time | Notes |
|---|---|---|---|---|---|
| 1 | 2 | Tobi Amusan | Nigeria | 13.04 | Q |
| 2 | 1 | Rikenette Steenkamp | South Africa | 13.17 | Q |
| 3 | 1 | Rosvitha Okou | Ivory Coast | 13.53 | Q |
| 4 | 1 | Grace Ayemoba | Nigeria | 13.94 | Q |
| 4 | 2 | Karel Elodie Ziketh | Ivory Coast | 13.94 | Q |
| 6 | 1 | Favour Efe | Nigeria | 14.12 | q |
| 7 | 1 | Adja Arrete Ndiaye | Senegal | 14.32 | q |
| 8 | 2 | Eleonore Bailly | Ivory Coast | 14.47 | Q |
| 9 | 2 | Priscillah Tabunda Nasimiyu | Kenya | 14.71 | |
| 10 | 1 | Hirpe Deribsa | Ethiopia | 15.14 | |
| | 2 | Gnima Faye | Senegal | DNF | |
| | 1 | Houda Hagras | Egypt | DNS | |
| | 1 | Marthe Koala | Burkina Faso | DNS | |
| | 2 | Rokya Fofana | Burkina Faso | DNS | |
| | 2 | Lina Ahmed | Egypt | DNS | |

=== Final ===
Wind: -1.4 m/s

| Rank | Lane | Athlete | Nationality | Time | Notes |
|---|---|---|---|---|---|
| 1st place, gold medalist(s) | 4 | Tobi Amusan | Nigeria | 12.86 | |
| 2nd place, silver medalist(s) | 6 | Rikenette Steenkamp | South Africa | 13.18 | |
| 3rd place, bronze medalist(s) | 5 | Rosvitha Okou | Ivory Coast | 13.39 | |
| 4 | 7 | Grace Ayemoba | Nigeria | 13.68 | |
| 5 | 3 | Karel Elodie Ziketh | Ivory Coast | 13.70 | |
| 6 | 1 | Favour Efe | Nigeria | 14.18 | |
| 7 | 2 | Adja Arrete Ndiaye | Senegal | 14.63 | |
| 8 | 8 | Eleonore Bailly | Ivory Coast | 14.84 | |
