= Rosa Rakotozafy =

Malagasy hurdler

Medal record

Women's athletics

Representing Madagascar

All-Africa Games
Bronze medal – third place	2011 Maputo	100 m hurdles

African Championships
Gold medal – first place	2002 Radès	100 m hurdles
Gold medal – first place	2004 Brazzaville	100 m hurdles
Silver medal – second place	1998 Dakar	4×100 m
Silver medal – second place	2000 Algiers	100 m hurdles

Lalanirina Rosa Rakotozafy OLY (born 12 November 1977) is a Malagasy athlete who specializes in the 100 metres hurdles.

Her personal best time is 12.84 seconds, achieved in July 1999 in Niort. This is the current Malagasy record. She also holds the national 200 metres record with 23.09 seconds.

== Competition record ==
Year	Competition	Venue	Position	Event	Notes
Representing Madagascar
1999	World Championships	Seville, Spain	19th (qf)	100 m hurdles	12.98
1999	World Championships	Seville, Spain	12th (h)	4 × 100 m relay	44.36
1999	All-Africa Games	Johannesburg, South Africa	4th	100 m hurdles	13.19
2000	African Championships	Algiers, Algeria	2nd	100 m hurdles	13.21
2000	Olympic Games	Sydney, Australia	34th (h)	100 m hurdles	13.80
2000	Olympic Games	Sydney, Australia	14th (sf)	4x100 m relay	43.98
2001	World Indoor Championships	Lisbon, Portugal	22nd (h)	60 m hurdles	8.36
2001	Jeux de la Francophonie	Ottawa, Canada	5th	100 m hurdles	13.10
2001	Jeux de la Francophonie	Ottawa, Canada	3rd	4 × 100 m relay	44.12
2001	World Championships	Edmonton, Canada	22nd (h)	100 m hurdles	13.24
2002	African Championships	Radès, Tunisia	1st	100 m hurdles	13.13 (w)
2003	World Indoor Championships	Birmingham, United Kingdom	14th (sf)	60 m hurdles	8.27
2004	African Championships	Brazzaville, Republic of the Congo	1st	100 m hurdles	13.73
2004	Olympic Games	Athens, Greece	32nd (h)	100 m hurdles	13.67
2011	All-Africa Games	Maputo, Mozambique	3rd	100 m hurdles	13.55
2012	World Indoor Championships	Istanbul, Turkey	25th (h)	60 m hurdles	8.74
2012	African Championships	Porto-Novo, Benin	5th	100 m hurdles	13.70

Olympic Games
Preceded by Joseph-Berlioz Randriamihaja	Flagbearer for Madagascar; 2004 Athens	Succeeded by Mathieu Razanakolona
