= Olutoyin Augustus =

Nigerian hurdler (born 1979)

Personal information
- Born: 24 December 1979 (age 46) Oyo, Nigeria
Medal record
Women's athletics
Representing Nigeria
All-Africa Games
Gold medal – first place	2007 Algiers	100 m hurdles
African Championships
Gold medal – first place	2006 Bambous	100 m hurdles
Silver medal – second place	2006 Bambous	4×100 m
Silver medal – second place	2008 Addis Ababa	100 m hurdles

Olutoyin "Toyin" Augustus (born 24 December 1979) is a former Nigerian hurdler who competed in the 100 metres hurdles.

She began her career with a win at the African Championships in Athletics in 2006, easily beating the opposition to the 100 m hurdles title. She went on to represent Africa at the 2006 IAAF World Cup, where she finished in eighth place. In 2007, she added the All-Africa Games title to her continental one, holding off a challenge from compatriot Jessica Ohanaja. She began competing at the global level, making appearances at the 2007 World Championships, 2008 IAAF World Indoor Championships and the 2008 Beijing Olympic Games, but she did not get past the heats stage at any of the events. She faced strong competition at continental level also, as Fatmata Fofanah took the 100 m hurdles title at the 2008 African Championships, leaving Augustus to settle for the silver medal.

She ran at the 2009 World Championships in Athletics, taking part in the hurdles competition as well as the women's 4×100 metres relay race for Nigeria. She reached the semi-final stage in the hurdles but was later disqualified and finished 16th overall in the sprint relay event. At the Berlin World Championships, Augustus was subject to a blood and urine test for the WADA. Her blood sample had no documented negative findings, but her urine sample tested positive for abnormal high levels of testosterone. The IAAF Doctor's opinion stated that "This finding could be compatible with an administration of testosterone and/or related prohormones…"

A series of examinations and tests conducted by an MD specialist in gynecology and reproductive endocrinology at the USC (University of Southern California) Medical Hospital found that Augustus had multiple ovarian cysts which the doctor linked to a disorder called polyendocrine metabolic ovarian syndrome (PMOS). PMOS is a metabolic dysfunction causing hormonal disruptions and elevated DHEA, a precursor hormone to other reproductive hormones such as testosterone.

To contest the positive doping test and defend her case, Augustus (a United States resident) was required to attend the B sample testing conducted in Germany. If the B sample was also positive, she would then have to fly to Nigeria to present her case to a committee appointed by her country's athletic federation. This committee would be the ruling body on her case. Although the doctor at USC concluded that the PMOS disorder caused the elevated DHEA levels in Augustus’ urine sample, these findings were rejected by the Nigerian committee. Augustus was ordered to serve the two year mandatory ban from IAAF sanctioned athletics competitions.

Augustus’ case was under review for several months, coming to a close in 2010. During this period Augustus continued to compete internationally, but withdrew from a competition in Belgium after notification that her case was rejected. Her ban was extended until February 2012 after it was discovered that she had competed while ineligible.

Toyin has recently been featured in various television spots for Xfinity 3D, Are You Smarter Than A 5th Grader? and most notably NCAA where she and other student athletes debunk the myth of the dumb jock stigma.

Her personal best time is 12.85 seconds, achieved in 2009 in Nantes.

She was let go of her role as the Director of Diversity, Equity, Inclusion and Belonging at Oakwood School in Los Angeles, California in 2023. Previously, she coached soccer and track at Phillips Exeter Academy.

== Achievements ==
Year	Competition	Venue	Position	Event
2006	African Championships	Bambous, Mauritius	1st	100 m hurdles
2006	IAAF World Cup	Athens, Greece	8th	100 m hurdles
2007	All-Africa Games	Algiers, Algeria	1st	100 m hurdles
2007	World Championships	Osaka, Japan	6th (heats)	100 m hurdles
2008	World Indoor Championships	Valencia, Spain	5th (heats)	60 m hurdles
2008	African Championships	Addis Ababa, Ethiopia	2nd	100 m hurdles
2008	Summer Olympics	Beijing, China	7th (heats)	100 m hurdles
2009	World Championships	Berlin, Germany	6th (semis)	100 m hurdles
2009	World Championships	Berlin, Germany	6th (heats)	4 × 100 m relay

== See also ==
- List of Pennsylvania State University Olympians
- 2008 African Championships in Athletics
