= Sarah Nambawa =

Ugandan triple jumper

Medal record

Women's athletics

Representing Uganda

African Championships
Gold medal – first place	2010 Nairobi	Triple jump
Gold medal – first place	2012 Porto-Novo	Triple jump

Sarah Nambawa (born 23 September 1985 in Kampala) is a Ugandan athlete specialising in the triple jump. She is a two-time African Champion.

Nambawa was a four-time All-American jumper for the Middle Tennessee Blue Raiders track and field team, placing runner-up in the triple jump at the 2009 NCAA Division I Indoor Track and Field Championships and 2010 NCAA Division I Outdoor Track and Field Championships.

Her personal best in the event is 14.06 m (46 ft 1 1/2 in) from 2011.

== International competition ==
Year	Competition	Venue	Position	Event	Notes
Representing Uganda
2009	Universiade	Belgrade, Serbia	11th	Long jump	6.06 m
2009	Universiade	Belgrade, Serbia	6th	Triple jump	13.58 m
2010	African Championships	Nairobi, Kenya	1st	Triple jump	13.95 m
2011	World Championships	Daegu, South Korea	33rd (q)	Triple jump	13.22 m
2012	African Championships	Porto-Novo, Benin	1st	Triple jump	13.90 m (w)
2013	World Championships	Moscow, Russia	20th (q)	Triple jump	13.31 m
