= Wang Lina (long jumper) =

Chinese long jumper (born 1983)

Wang Lina (simplified Chinese: 王丽娜; traditional Chinese: 王麗娜; pinyin: Wáng Lìnà; born February 28, 1983, in Benxi, Liaoning) is a Chinese long jumper.

Wang won the silver medal at the 2002 World Junior Championships, and competed at the 2004 Olympic Games without reaching the final.

In 2005, she tested positive for the banned substance norandrosterone. She was suspended from the sport between August 2005 and August 2007.

Her personal best jump is 6.72 metres, achieved in July 2004 in Beijing.

== See also ==
- List of sportspeople sanctioned for doping offences
