= Alicia Brown =

Canadian track and field athlete

Personal information
- Born: January 21, 1990 (age 36) Ottawa, Ontario
- Education: University of Toronto
- Height: 1.65 m (5 ft 5 in)
- Weight: 57 kg (126 lb)

Sport
- Country: Canada
- Sport: Athletics
- Event: Sprints

Achievements and titles
- Personal best: 400m: 51.82

Alicia Brown (born January 21, 1990, in Ottawa, Ontario) is a Canadian track and field athlete competing in the sprint events, predominantly the 400m event.

Brown attended the University of Toronto Mississauga, earning the title of OUA women's track MVP in 2013. She graduated with an Honours Bachelor of Arts in Communication, Culture, Information and Technology, specializing in Visual Culture and Communication.

She represented Canada at the 2016 and 2020 Summer Olympics as part of the 4 × 400 m relay team. Both times the Canadian team finished in fourth place.

Brown was banned from competition during a two-year period starting in November 2013 by the Canadian Centre for Ethics in Sport following a doping violation caused by a positive hydrochlorothiazide test.
