= Chinonye Ohadugha =

Nigerian triple jumper

Medal record

Women's athletics

Representing Nigeria

African Championships
Bronze medal – third place	2008 Addis Ababa	Triple jump

Chinonyelum Pius "Chinonye" Ohadugha (born 24 March 1986) is a Nigerian triple jumper.

In 2006, she finished fourth at the Commonwealth Games. In 2007, she won the silver medal at the All-Africa Games with a jump of 14.21 metres, a new Nigerian record. She did not reach the final round at the 2007 World Championships, but won the bronze medal at the 2008 African Championships. She competed at the 2008 Olympic Games without reaching the final.

She also finished fifth in 4 x 100 metres relay at the 2005 Summer Universiade.

== Competition record ==
Year	Competition	Venue	Position	Event	Notes
Representing Nigeria
2005	Universiade	İzmir, Turkey	5th	4 × 100 m relay	46.32 s
2005	Universiade	İzmir, Turkey	31st (q)	Long jump	5.56 m
2005	Universiade	İzmir, Turkey	11th	Triple jump	12.91 m
2006	Commonwealth Games	Melbourne, Australia	4th	Triple jump	13.26 m
2007	All-Africa Games	Algiers, Algeria	2nd	Triple jump	14.21 m
2007	World Championships	Osaka, Japan	26th (q)	Triple jump	13.32 m
2008	African Championships	Addis Ababa, Ethiopia	3rd	Triple jump	14.14 m
2008	Olympic Games	Beijing, China	30th (q)	Triple jump	13.29 m
