= Fatmata Fofanah =

Guinean hurdler (born 1985)

Medal record

Women's athletics

Representing Guinea

African Championships
Gold medal – first place	2008 Addis Ababa	100 m hurdles

Fatmata Fofanah (born 10 June 1985 in Freetown, Sierra Leone) is a Guinean athlete who specializes in the 100 metres hurdles. Born in Sierra Leone during the Civil War, she grew up in Guinea and the United States. Fatmata was twice an All-American Women's Track and Field athlete for the Georgia Tech Yellow Jackets, and in early 2008, won the 100 Metre Hurdles Gold Medal at the African Championships in Addis Ababa, Ethiopia.

She was chosen for the 2008 Guinean Olympic squad to run the Women's 100 m hurdles, was the Flag Bearer for her nation, and was much favoured going into her first qualifying heat. She fell at the first hurdle, and while uninjured, was unable to finish.

Her brother, Nabie Foday Fofanah is a sprinter who has also competed in the 2004 and 2008 Guinean Olympic squads.

Her personal best time is 12.96 seconds, achieved in June 2007 in Sacramento.

== Achievements ==
Year	Competition	Venue	Position	Event	Notes
Representing Guinea
2007	All-Africa Games	Algiers, Algeria	3rd	100 m hrd	13.76
2008	African Championships	Addis Ababa, Ethiopia	1st	100 m hrd	13.10 (NR)
2008	Olympic Games	Beijing, China	– (h)	100 m hrd	DNF
Representing Bahrain
2009	Asian Championships	Guangzhou, China	6th	100 m hrd	13.63
