= Gauthier Okawe =

Gabonese sprinter

Personal information
- Nationality: Gabonese
- Born: 9 April 1991 (age 34)

Sport
- Sport: Track and field
- Event: 100m

Gauthier Okawe (born 9 April 1991) is a Gabonese sprinter. He competed in the 100 metres event at the 2013 World Championships in Athletics.
