= Carole Kaboud Mebam =

Cameroonian athletics competitor

Medal record

Women's athletics

Representing Cameroon

African Championships
Gold medal – first place	2002 Radès	4×400 m
Silver medal – second place	2002 Radès	400 m hurdles
Silver medal – second place	2004 Brazzaville	100 m hurdles
Silver medal – second place	2006 Bambous	100 m hurdles
Silver medal – second place	2010 Nairobi	4×100 m
Bronze medal – third place	2004 Brazzaville	4×400 m
Bronze medal – third place	2006 Bambous	4×100 m
Bronze medal – third place	2008 Addis Ababa	100 m hurdles

Carole Madeleine Kaboud Mebam (born 17 September 1978) is a Cameroonian athlete who specializes in the 100 and 400 metres hurdles.

== Achievements ==
Year	Competition	Venue	Position	Event	Notes
Representing Cameroon
2001	Jeux de la Francophonie	Ottawa, Canada	10th (h)	400 m hrd	61.11
2001	Universiade	Beijing, China	8th (qf)	200 m	24.91
2001	Universiade	Beijing, China	6th (h)	400 m	54.71
2002	Commonwealth Games	Manchester, United Kingdom	12th (h)	400 m hrd	59.30
2002	Commonwealth Games	Manchester, United Kingdom	6th	4 × 100 m relay	3:32.74
2002	African Championships	Radès, Tunisia	2nd	400 m hrd	58.11
2002	African Championships	Radès, Tunisia	1st	4 × 400 m relay	3:35.33
2003	World Championships	Paris, France	7th	4 × 400 m relay	3:27.08 (NR)
2003	All-Africa Games	Abuja, Nigeria	6th (h)	100 m hrd	14.00
2003	All-Africa Games	Abuja, Nigeria	3rd	400 m hrd	58.28
2003	Afro-Asian Games	Hyderabad, India	6th	400 m hrd	58.47
2004	African Championships	Brazzaville, Congo	2nd	100 m hrd	14.07
2004	African Championships	Brazzaville, Congo	5th	400 m hrd	58.38
2004	African Championships	Brazzaville, Congo	3rd	4 × 400 m relay	3:30.77
2004	Olympic Games	Athens, Greece	14th (h)	4 × 400 m relay	3:29.93
2005	Jeux de la Francophonie	Niamey, Niger	2nd	100 m hrd	13.58
2005	Jeux de la Francophonie	Niamey, Niger	5th	4 × 100 m relay	46.72
2005	Jeux de la Francophonie	Niamey, Niger	4th	4 × 400 m relay	3:46.38
2006	Commonwealth Games	Melbourne	11th (h)	100 m hrd	13.82
2006	Commonwealth Games	Melbourne	10th (h)	400 m hrd	58.04
2006	African Championships	Bambous, Mauritius	2nd	100 m hrd	13.85
2006	African Championships	Bambous, Mauritius	7th	400 m hrd	58.46
2006	African Championships	Bambous, Mauritius	3rd	4 × 100 m relay	46.43
2008	African Championships	Addis Ababa, Ethiopia	3rd	100 m hrd	13.52
2008	African Championships	Addis Ababa, Ethiopia	5th	400 m hrd	57.47
2008	Olympic Games	Beijing, China	24th (h)	400 m hrd	57.81
2009	World Championships	Berlin, Germany	30th (h)	400 m hrd	58.10
2009	Jeux de la Francophonie	Beirut, Lebanon	5th	100 m hrd	13.55
2009	Jeux de la Francophonie	Beirut, Lebanon	3rd	400 m hrd	58.85
2009	Jeux de la Francophonie	Beirut, Lebanon	3rd	4 × 100 m relay	46.24
2010	African Championships	Nairobi, Kenya	5th	100 m hrd	14.16
2010	African Championships	Nairobi, Kenya	8th	400 m hrd	58.05
2010	African Championships	Nairobi, Kenya	2nd	4 × 100 m relay	44.90
2010	Commonwealth Games	Delhi, India	5th	400 m hrd	57.61

=== Personal bests ===
- 100 metres hurdles – 13.71 s (2008)
- 400 metres hurdles – 56.90 s (2008) – national record

She also holds the national record in 4 × 400 metres relay with 3:27.08 minutes, achieved together with teammates Mirelle Nguimgo, Delphine Atangana and Hortense Béwouda in August 2003 in Paris.
