= Worokia Sanou =

Burkinabé triple jumper

Worokia Sanou (born 31 December 1989) is a Burkinabé triple jumper.

As a junior she won two bronze medals at the 2005 (in relay) and 2007 African Junior Championships. She finished fifth at the 2009 Jeux de la Francophonie, fifth at the 2010 African Championships, fourth at the 2011 All-Africa Games, and thirteenth (in the long jump) at the 2014 African Championships.

Her personal best jump is 13.40 metres, achieved at the 2010 African Championships in Nairobi.
