= 2006 African Championships in Athletics – Women's 400 metres =

The women's 400 metres event at the 2006 African Championships in Athletics was held at the Stade Germain Comarmond on August 10–11.

== Medalists ==
Gold	Silver	Bronze
Amy Mbacké Thiam; Senegal	Amantle Montsho; Botswana	Louise Ayétotché; Ivory Coast

== Results ==
=== Heats ===
Rank	Heat	Name	Nationality	Time	Notes
1	2	Amantle Montsho	Botswana	52.39	Q
2	3	Amy Mbacké Thiam	Senegal	52.76	Q
3	1	Christy Ekpukhon	Nigeria	52.88	Q
4	2	Louise Ayétotché	Ivory Coast	53.02	Q
5	2	Amanda Kotze	South Africa	53.54	q
6	3	Heide Seyerling	South Africa	53.67	Q
7	3	Kou Luogon	Liberia	53.79	q
8	1	Estie Wittstock	South Africa	53.98	Q
9	3	Elizabeth Muthuka	Kenya	54.26	
10	1	Sandrine Thiébaud-Kangni	Togo	54.63	
11	1	Josephine Nyarunda	Kenya	54.72	
12	2	Alice Nwosu	Nigeria	54.75	
13	3	Florence Wasike	Kenya	55.02	
14	2	Justine Bayigga	Uganda	55.41	
15	1	Vivian Mills	Ghana	57.01	
16	3	Saka Souliatou	Benin	57.10	
17	2	Nathalie Sonia Itok	Cameroon	57.13	
18	1	Anabelle Lascar	Mauritius	57.20	
19	1	Claudine Yemalin	Benin	57.80	
20	2	Jeanne D'Arc Uwamahoro	Rwanda	1:01.25	
	2	Kadiatou Camara	Mali	DNS	
	3	Kaltouma Nadjina	Chad	DNS	

=== Final ===
Rank	Lane	Name	Nationality	Time	Notes
1st place, gold medalist(s)	6	Amy Mbacké Thiam	Senegal	52.22	
2nd place, silver medalist(s)	5	Amantle Montsho	Botswana	52.68	
3rd place, bronze medalist(s)	3	Louise Ayétotché	Ivory Coast	52.92	
4	2	Heide Seyerling	South Africa	53.26	
5	2	Christy Ekpukhon	Nigeria	53.30	
6	7	Amanda Kotze	South Africa	53.42	
7	8	Kou Luogon	Liberia	53.86	
8	1	Estie Wittstock	South Africa	54.34	
