= 2007 World Championships in Athletics – Women's 400 metres =

The women's 400 metres at the 2007 World Championships in Athletics was held at the Nagai Stadium on 26, 27 and 29 August.

== Medalists ==
Gold	Silver	Bronze
Christine Ohuruogu; Great Britain	Nicola Sanders; Great Britain	Novlene Williams; Jamaica

== Schedule ==
Date	Time	Round
August 26, 2007	10:50	Heats
August 27, 2007	21:10	Semifinals
August 29, 2007	21:50	Final

== Results ==
KEY:	q	Fastest non-qualifiers	Q	Qualified	WR	World record	AR	Area record	NR	National record	PB	Personal best	SB	Seasonal best

=== Heats ===
Qualification: First 4 in each heat (Q) and the next 4 fastest (q) advance to the semifinals.

Rank	Heat	Name	Nationality	Time	Notes
1	4	Novlene Williams	Jamaica	50.21	Q
2	5	Christine Ohuruogu	Great Britain	50.46	Q, SB
3	5	Ilona Usovich	Belarus	50.53	Q, NR
4	4	Ana Guevara	Mexico	50.85	Q
5	1	Natalya Antyukh	Russia	50.88	Q
6	5	Natasha Hastings	United States	51.07	Q
7	1	Mary Wineberg	United States	51.25	Q
8	2	DeeDee Trotter	United States	51.27	Q
9	1	Shereefa Lloyd	Jamaica	51.42	Q
10	1	Lee McConnell	Great Britain	51.44	Q, SB
11	2	Nicola Sanders	Great Britain	51.45	Q
12	2	Joanne Cuddihy	Ireland	51.55	Q, SB
12	2	Christine Amertil	Bahamas	51.55	Q
14	4	Ionela Târlea-Manolache	Romania	51.59	Q
15	3	Tatyana Veshkurova	Russia	51.67	Q
16	3	Shericka Williams	Jamaica	51.72	Q
17	4	Aymée Martínez	Cuba	51.74	Q, PB
18	5	Indira Terrero	Cuba	51.76	Q
19	3	Barbara Petráhn	Hungary	51.86	Q, SB
20	3	Amantle Montsho	Botswana	51.87	Q
21	4	Aliann Pompey	Guyana	51.95	q
22	5	Daniela Reina	Italy	52.02	q, SB
23	4	Christy Ekpukhon Ihunaegbo	Nigeria	52.05	q
24	5	Asami Tanno	Japan	52.13	q, SB
25	2	Zuzanna Radecka	Poland	52.19	
26	4	Makelesi Bulikiobo	Fiji	52.23	SB
27	1	Oksana Shcherbak	Ukraine	52.39	
28	3	Kineke Alexander	Saint Vincent and the Grenadines	52.51	
29	2	Folashade Abugan	Nigeria	52.58	
30	5	Gabriela Medina	Mexico	53.16	
31	1	Justine Bayigga	Uganda	53.25	
32	2	Maria Laura Almirão	Brazil	53.68	
33	1	Joy Eze	Nigeria	53.83	
34	3	Ginou Etienne	Haiti	53.89	
35	4	Solen Désert	France	54.03	
36	1	Olga Tereshkova	Kazakhstan	54.09	
37	5	Sandrine Thiébaud-Kangni	Togo	54.11	
38	3	Amy Mbacké Thiam	Senegal	54.31	
39	2	Hazel-Ann Regis	Grenada	54.78	SB
40	3	Nawal El Jack	Sudan	55.29	
41	5	Temalangeni Dlamini	Swaziland	58.27	PB
42	2	Vera Barbosa	Cape Verde	58.56	

=== Semifinals ===
First 2 in each semifinal(Q) and the next 2 fastest(q) advance to the final.

Rank	Heat	Name	Nationality	Time	Notes
1	1	Novlene Williams	Jamaica	49.66	Q, SB
2	2	Nicola Sanders	Great Britain	49.77	Q, PB
3	2	Natalya Antyukh	Russia	49.93	Q, SB
4	3	Christine Ohuruogu	Great Britain	50.16	Q, PB
5	1	Ana Guevara	Mexico	50.19	Q, SB
6	3	Mary Wineberg	United States	50.27	Q
7	2	DeeDee Trotter	United States	50.31	q
7	1	Ilona Usovich	Belarus	50.31	q, NR
9	2	Shericka Williams	Jamaica	50.37	SB
10	3	Tatyana Veshkurova	Russia	50.71	
11	1	Joanne Cuddihy	Ireland	50.73	NR
12	3	Amantle Montsho	Botswana	50.90	NR
13	3	Shereefa Lloyd	Jamaica	51.00	PB
14	1	Lee McConnell	Great Britain	51.07	SB
15	1	Indira Terrero	Cuba	51.08	
16	2	Christine Amertil	Bahamas	51.18	
17	1	Natasha Hastings	United States	51.45	
18	3	Christy Ekpukhon Ihunaegbo	Nigeria	51.60	
19	3	Ionela Târlea-Manolache	Romania	51.62	
20	1	Asami Tanno	Japan	51.81	SB
21	2	Daniela Reina	Italy	51.99	SB
22	2	Barbara Petráhn	Hungary	52.12	
23	2	Aliann Pompey	Guyana	53.58	
24	3	Aymée Martínez	Cuba	57.77	

=== Final ===
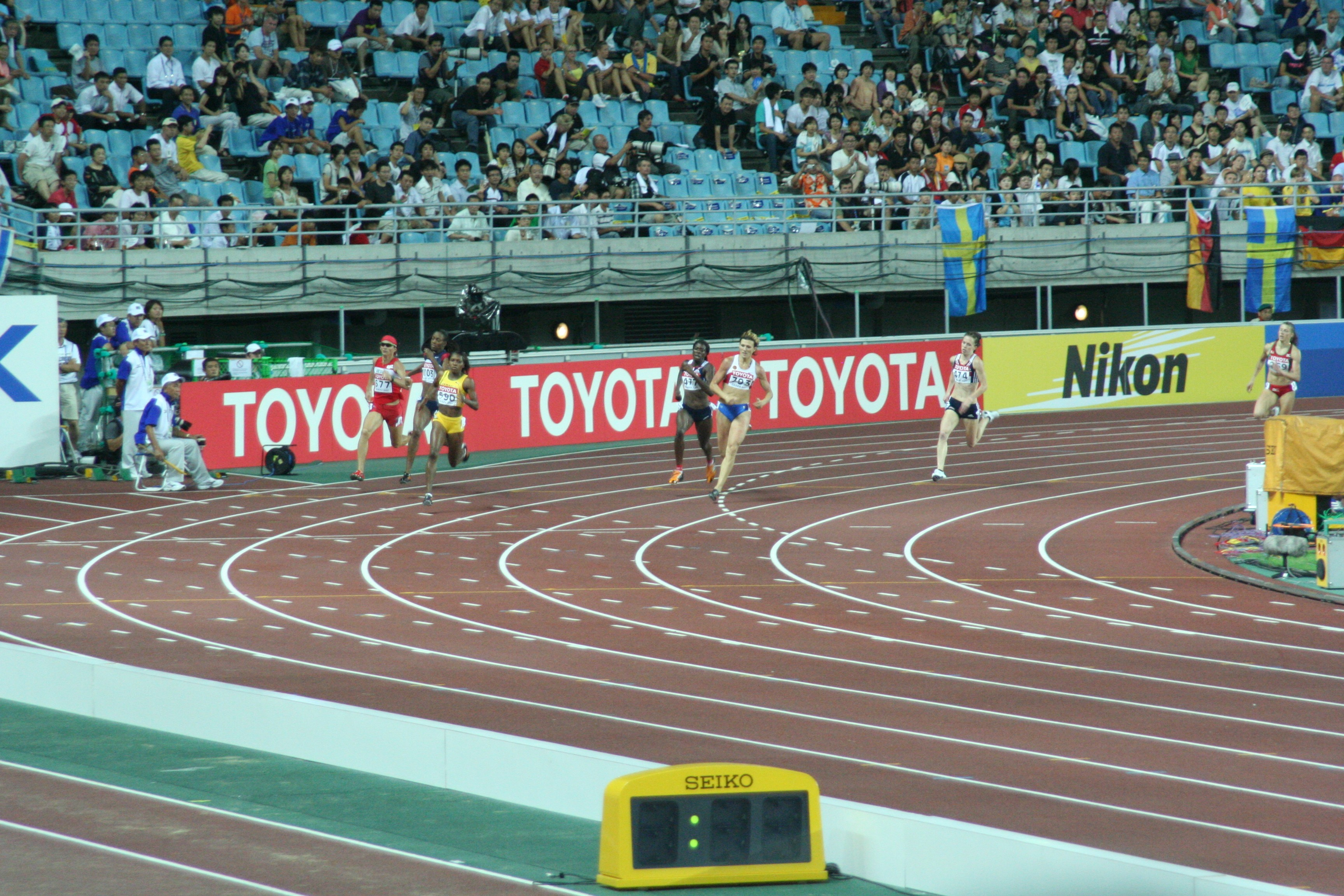
The final

Rank	Lane	Name	Nationality	Time	Notes
1st place, gold medalist(s)	6	Christine Ohuruogu	Great Britain	49.61	PB
2nd place, silver medalist(s)	4	Nicola Sanders	Great Britain	49.65	PB
3rd place, bronze medalist(s)	7	Novlene Williams	Jamaica	49.66	SB
4	9	Ana Guevara	Mexico	50.16	SB
5	8	DeeDee Trotter	United States	50.17	
6	5	Natalya Antyukh	Russia	50.33	
7	3	Ilona Usovich	Belarus	50.54	
8	2	Mary Wineberg	United States	50.96	
