= Athletics at the 2006 Commonwealth Games – Women's 400 metres =

Women's 400 metres at the Commonwealth Games

The women's 400 metres event at the 2006 Commonwealth Games was held on March 19–21.

== Medalists ==
| Gold | Silver | Bronze |
|---|---|---|
| Christine Ohuruogu; England | Tonique Williams; Bahamas | Novlene Williams; Jamaica |

== Results ==
=== Heats ===
Qualification: First 3 of each heat (Q) and the next 9 fastest (q) qualified for the semifinals.

| Rank | Heat | Name | Nationality | Time | Notes |
|---|---|---|---|---|---|
| 1 | 4 | Hazel-Ann Regis | Grenada | 51.47 | Q, SB |
| 2 | 4 | Novlene Williams | Jamaica | 51.51 | Q |
| 3 | 2 | Christine Amertil | Bahamas | 51.85 | Q |
| 4 | 3 | Christine Ohuruogu | England | 51.97 | Q |
| 5 | 2 | Shericka Williams | Jamaica | 52.18 | Q |
| 6 | 3 | Joy Eze | Nigeria | 52.44 | Q |
| 7 | 1 | Tonique Williams | Bahamas | 52.58 | Q |
| 8 | 1 | Christiana Ekpukhon | Nigeria | 52.67 | Q |
| 9 | 1 | Jane Arnott | New Zealand | 52.82 | Q |
| 10 | 3 | Amantle Montsho | Botswana | 52.83 | Q |
| 11 | 2 | Rosemary Hayward | Australia | 52.90 | Q |
| 12 | 3 | Kineke Alexander | Saint Vincent and the Grenadines | 52.95 | q |
| 13 | 4 | Kimberly Wall | England | 53.05 | Q |
| 14 | 4 | Manjit Kaur | India | 53.06 | q |
| 15 | 3 | Ronetta Smith | Jamaica | 53.07 | q |
| 16 | 1 | Jaimee Hoebergen | Australia | 53.12 | q |
| 17 | 5 | Estie Wittstock | South Africa | 53.13 | Q |
| 18 | 5 | Tamsyn Lewis | Australia | 53.21 | Q |
| 19 | 2 | Adri Schoeman | South Africa | 53.24 | q |
| 20 | 2 | Catherine Murphy | Wales | 53.67 | q |
| 21 | 5 | Aliann Pompey | Guyana | 53.76 | Q |
| 22 | 1 | Nickeisha Charles | Trinidad and Tobago | 55.57 | q |
| 23 | 5 | Bushra Parveen | Pakistan | 56.03 | q, PB |
| 24 | 4 | Florence Wasike | Kenya | 56.55 | q |
| 25 | 3 | Toea Wisil | Papua New Guinea | 56.72 | PB |
| 26 | 3 | Rachel Nachula | Zambia | 57.18 | |
| 27 | 4 | Sarah Bona | Sierra Leone | 57.25 | |
| 28 | 5 | Muriel Noah Ahanda | Cameroon | 57.76 | |
| 29 | 2 | Betty Barua | Papua New Guinea | 57.85 | PB |
| 30 | 2 | Sarah Turay | Sierra Leone | 58.07 | |
| 31 | 1 | Cecelia Kumalalamene | Papua New Guinea | 58.59 | PB |
| 32 | 1 | Temalangeni Dlamini | Swaziland | 58.97 | |
| | 5 | Donna Fraser | England | DNS | |

=== Semifinals ===
Qualification: First 2 of each semifinal (Q) and the next 2 fastest (q) qualified for the final.

| Rank | Heat | Name | Nationality | Time | Notes |
|---|---|---|---|---|---|
| 1 | 3 | Christine Ohuruogu | England | 50.87 | Q |
| 2 | 3 | Tonique Williams | Bahamas | 50.97 | Q |
| 3 | 1 | Novlene Williams | Jamaica | 51.03 | Q, SB |
| 4 | 2 | Christine Amertil | Bahamas | 51.36 | Q |
| 5 | 2 | Shericka Williams | Jamaica | 51.65 | Q, SB |
| 6 | 1 | Hazel-Ann Regis | Grenada | 51.75 | Q |
| 7 | 2 | Manjit Kaur | India | 52.31 | q |
| 8 | 1 | Rosemary Hayward | Australia | 52.47 | q, SB |
| 9 | 2 | Estie Wittstock | South Africa | 52.49 | |
| 10 | 2 | Joy Eze | Nigeria | 52.51 | |
| 11 | 1 | Jane Arnott | New Zealand | 52.53 | |
| 12 | 3 | Christiana Ekpukhon | Nigeria | 52.67 | |
| 13 | 3 | Tamsyn Lewis | Australia | 52.88 | |
| 14 | 3 | Adri Schoeman | South Africa | 53.03 | |
| 15 | 1 | Amantle Montsho | Botswana | 53.07 | |
| 16 | 1 | Ronetta Smith | Jamaica | 53.11 | |
| 17 | 2 | Kineke Alexander | Saint Vincent and the Grenadines | 53.19 | |
| 18 | 2 | Jaimee Hoebergen | Australia | 53.26 | |
| 19 | 1 | Kimberly Wall | England | 53.75 | |
| 20 | 3 | Catherine Murphy | Wales | 55.35 | |
| 21 | 3 | Nickeisha Charles | Trinidad and Tobago | 55.47 | |
| 22 | 2 | Bushra Parveen | Pakistan | 56.75 | |
| | 3 | Aliann Pompey | Guyana | DNF | |
| | 1 | Florence Wasike | Kenya | DQ | |

=== Final ===
| Rank | Lane | Name | Nationality | Time | Notes |
|---|---|---|---|---|---|
| 1st place, gold medalist(s) | 5 | Christine Ohuruogu | England | 50.28 | PB |
| 2nd place, silver medalist(s) | 4 | Tonique Williams | Bahamas | 50.76 | |
| 3rd place, bronze medalist(s) | 6 | Novlene Williams | Jamaica | 51.12 | |
| 4 | 3 | Christine Amertil | Bahamas | 51.52 | |
| 5 | 2 | Shericka Williams | Jamaica | 51.81 | |
| 6 | 7 | Hazel-Ann Regis | Grenada | 52.35 | |
| 7 | 1 | Manjit Kaur | India | 52.58 | |
| 8 | 8 | Rosemary Hayward | Australia | 52.81 | |
