= Athletics at the 2006 Commonwealth Games – Women's 4 × 400 metres relay =

Women's 4 × 400 metres relay at the Commonwealth Games

The women's 4 × 400 metres relay event at the 2006 Commonwealth Games was held on March 25.

== Results ==
Rank	Nation	Athletes	Time	Notes
1st place, gold medalist(s)	Australia	Jana Pittman, Caitlin Willis, Tamsyn Lewis, Rosemary Hayward	3:28.66	
2nd place, silver medalist(s)	India	Rajwinder Kaur, Chitra Soman, Manjit Kaur, Pinki Parmanik	3:29.57	
3rd place, bronze medalist(s)	Nigeria	Kudirat Akhigbe, Joy Eze, Folashade Abugan, Christiana Ekpukhon	3:31.83	
4	Jamaica	Ronetta Smith, Novlene Williams, Shellene Williams, Shericka Williams	3:34.91	
5	Papua New Guinea	Mae Koime, Salome Dell, Betty Burua, Toea Wisil	3:47.88	
	England	Kimberly Wall, Nicola Sanders, Natasha Danvers, Christine Ohuruogu	DQ R170.9	
	South Africa	Tsholofelo Selemela, Adri Schoeman, Amanda Kotze, Estie Wittstock	DQ R163.3	
	Sierra Leone	Fatmata Bangura, Marion Bangura, Sarah Bona, Isha Conteh	DNS	
