= 2005 World Championships in Athletics – Women's 400 metres =

The women's 400 metres at the 2005 World Championships in Athletics was held on August 7, 8 and 10 at the Helsinki Olympic Stadium.

== Medals ==
| Gold: | Silver: | Bronze: |
|---|---|---|
| (The Bahamas) Tonique Williams-Darling (Bahamas) | Sanya Richards (United States) | Ana Guevara (Mexico) |

== Results ==
All times shown are in seconds.

AR area record | CR championship record | GR games record | NR national record | OR Olympic record | PB personal best | SB season best | WL world leading (in a given season)
DNS = did not start | DQ = disqualification | NM = no mark (i.e. no valid result) | Q = qualification by place in heat | q = qualification by overall place

=== Heats ===
August 7, 2005

==== Heat 1 ====
1. (Mexico) Ana Guevara 51.14 Q
2. (The Bahamas) Christine Amertil 51.35 Q
3. (Senegal) Fatou Bintou Fall 51.45 Q
4. (United Kingdom) Donna Fraser 51.68 q
5. (Poland) Anna Guzowska 52.20 q
6. (Greece) Dímitra Dóva 52.29
7. (Estonia) Egle Uljas 52.94 (SB)
8. (Liberia) Kou Luogon 54.85

==== Heat 2 ====
1. (United States) DeeDee Trotter 51.44 Q
2. (United Kingdom) Christine Ohuruogu 51.76 Q
3. (Republic of Ireland) Karen Shinkins 51.82 Q
4. (Chad) Kaltouma Nadjina 51.88 q
5. (Brazil) Lucimar Teodoro 52.19 q
6. (Japan) Asami Tanno 52.80
7. (Togo) Sandrine Thiébaud-Kangni 53.39
8. (Armenia) Gayane Bulghadaryan 59.46

==== Heat 3 ====
1. (Russia) Svetlana Pospelova 50.80 Q
2. (Saint Kitts and Nevis) Tiandra Ponteen 51.37 Q
3. (Sudan) Nawal El Jack 51.61 Q
4. (Brazil) Maria Laura Almirão 52.69
5. (Cuba) Libania Grenot 53.05
6. (Hungary) Barbara Petráhn 53.09
7. (Finland) Kirsi Mykkänen 53.10
8. (Maldives) Shifana Ali 1:01.55 (SB)

==== Heat 4 ====
1. (The Bahamas) Tonique Williams-Darling 51.04 Q
2. (Russia) Olesya Zykina 51.59 Q
3. (Jamaica) Shericka Williams 52.07 Q
4. (Belarus) Anna Kozak 52.19 q
5. (Poland) Grażyna Prokopek 52.39
6. (France) Solen Désert-Mariller 52.94
7. (Botswana) Amantle Montsho 53.97

==== Heat 5 ====
1. (United States) Sanya Richards 51.00 Q
2. (Senegal) Amy Mbacké Thiam 51.66 Q
3. (Jamaica) Lorraine Fenton 52.07 Q
4. (Grenada) Hazel-Ann Regis 52.51
5. (Ukraine) Antonina Yefremova 52.89
6. (Guyana) Aliann Pompey 53.12
7. (South Africa) Estie Wittstock 53.28

==== Heat 6 ====
1. (Russia) Natalya Antyukh 51.38 Q
2. (United States) Monique Henderson 51.65 Q
3. (Belarus) Ilona Usovich 51.66 Q
4. (United Kingdom) Lee McConnell 52.00 q
5. (Jamaica) Ronetta Smith 52.26
6. (Saint Vincent and the Grenadines) Kineke Alexander 54.45
7. (Syria) Mounira Al-Saleh 55.83
- (Cameroon) Hortense Bewouda DNF

=== Semifinal ===
August 8, 2005

==== Heat 1 ====
1. (United States) Sanya Richards 50.05 Q
2. (Senegal) Amy Mbacké Thiam 50.83 Q (SB)
3. (Russia) Natalya Antyukh 50.99
4. (Sudan) Nawal El Jack 51.85
5. (Saint Kitts and Nevis) Tiandra Ponteen 51.88
6. (Jamaica) Shericka Williams 52.44
7. (United Kingdom) Donna Fraser 52.48
8. (Belarus) Anna Kozak 52.73

==== Heat 2 ====
1. (Russia) Svetlana Pospelova 50.34 Q
2. (United States) DeeDee Trotter 50.73 Q
3. (The Bahamas) Christine Amertil 51.03
4. (United Kingdom) Christine Ohuruogu 51.43
5. (Jamaica) Lorraine Fenton 51.48
6. (Chad) Kaltouma Nadjina 52.07
7. (Senegal) Fatou Bintou Fall 52.35
8. (Poland) Anna Guzowska 52.45

==== Heat 3 ====
1. (The Bahamas) Tonique Williams-Darling 49.69 Q (SB)
2. (Mexico) Ana Guevara 50.33 Q
3. (Russia) Olesya Zykina 50.73 q (SB)
4. (United States) Monique Henderson 50.73 q
5. (Belarus) Ilona Usovich 50.96 (PB)
6. (United Kingdom) Lee McConnell 51.15 (SB)
7. (Brazil) Lucimar Teodoro 51.98
8. (Republic of Ireland) Karen Shinkins 52.17

=== Final ===
August 10, 2005

1. (The Bahamas) Tonique Williams-Darling 49.55 (SB)
2. (United States) Sanya Richards 49.74
3. (Mexico) Ana Guevara 49.81 (SB)
4. (Russia) Svetlana Pospelova 50.11
5. (United States) DeeDee Trotter 51.14
6. (Russia) Olesya Zykina 51.24
7. (United States) Monique Henderson 51.77
8. (Senegal) Amy Mbacké Thiam 52.22
