= Athletics at the 2007 All-Africa Games – Women's 400 metres =

The women's 400 metres at the 2007 All-Africa Games were held on July 18–20.

== Medalists ==
Gold	Silver	Bronze
Amantle Montsho; Botswana	Joy Eze; Nigeria	Folashade Abugan; Nigeria

== Results ==
=== Heats ===
Qualification: First 3 of each heat (Q) and the next 4 fastest (q) qualified for the semifinals.

Rank	Heat	Name	Nationality	Time	Notes
1	4	Joy Eze	Nigeria	52.14	Q
2	1	Amantle Montsho	Botswana	52.23	Q
3	1	Folashade Abugan	Nigeria	52.33	Q
4	4	Tsholofelo Selemela	South Africa	52.48	Q
5	4	Nawal El Jack	Sudan	52.61	Q
6	1	Amanda Kotze	South Africa	52.76	Q
7	3	Christy Ekpukhon	Nigeria	52.99	Q
8	1	Fatou Bintou Fall	Senegal	53.00	q
9	1	Elizabeth Muthoka	Kenya	53.24	q
9	4	Herunga Jipekapora	Namibia	53.24	q
11	3	Kou Luogon	Liberia	53.42	Q
12	4	Justine Bayiga	Uganda	53.55	q
13	2	Estie Wittstock	South Africa	53.86	Q
14	4	Elisa Cossa	Mozambique	54.09	PB
15	2	Rabecca Nachula	Zambia	54.32	Q
16	4	Racheal Nachula	Zambia	54.40	
17	4	Ndeye Fatou Soumah	Senegal	54.80	
18	1	Faiza Omar	Sudan	54.89	
19	2	Zipporah Ratemo	Kenya	55.32	Q
20	1	Zehra Bouras	Algeria	55.47	
21	1	Sophia Chirairon	Zimbabwe	55.76	
22	3	Josephine Nyarunda	Kenya	56.06	Q
23	2	Nathalie Sonia Itock	Cameroon	56.16	
24	3	Nazret Gebrehiwet	Eritrea	57.19	
25	3	Epiphanie Uwintije	Rwanda	58.26	
26	2	Elodie Ngarlemdana	Chad	59.53	
27	3	Marianna Camara	Guinea	1:01.60	
	2	Fabienne Feraez	Benin	DNS	
	2	Amy Mbacké Thiam	Senegal	DNS	
	2	Sandrine Thiebaud	Togo	DNS	

=== Semifinals ===
Qualification: First 3 of each semifinal (Q) and the next 2 fastest (q) qualified for the final.

Rank	Heat	Name	Nationality	Time	Notes
1	1	Joy Eze	Nigeria	51.34	Q
2	2	Amantle Montsho	Botswana	51.54	Q, NR
3	2	Christy Ekphukhon	Nigeria	51.66	Q
4	1	Folashade Abugan	Nigeria	51.78	Q
5	2	Nawal El Jack	Sudan	52.26	q
6	2	Folashade Abugan	Nigeria	52.46	Q, NR
7	1	Kou Luogon	Senegal	52.66	Q
8	1	Estie Wittstock	South Africa	52.74	q
9	1	Tsholofelo Selemela	South Africa	52.91	
10	2	Fatou Bintou Fall	Senegal	53.03	
11	2	Amanda Kotze	South Africa	53.33	
12	2	Rabecca Nachula	Zambia	53.45	
13	1	Justine Bayiga	Uganda	53.55	
14	1	Elizabeth Muthoka	Kenya	53.56	
15	1	Zipporah Ratemo	Kenya	54.84	
16	2	Josephine Nyarunda	Kenya	55.31	

=== Final ===
Rank	Name	Nationality	Time	Notes
1st place, gold medalist(s)	Amantle Montsho	Botswana	51.13	NR
2nd place, silver medalist(s)	Joy Eze	Nigeria	51.20	
3rd place, bronze medalist(s)	Folashade Abugan	Nigeria	51.44	
4	Nawal El Jack	Sudan	51.83	
5	Christy Ekpukhon	Nigeria	51.90	
6	Estie Wittstock	South Africa	52.56	
7	Herunga Jipekapora	Namibia	53.13	
8	Kou Luogon	Liberia	54.08	
