= Athletics at the 2008 Summer Olympics – Women's 400 metres =

Women's 400 metres at the Games of the XXIX Olympiad
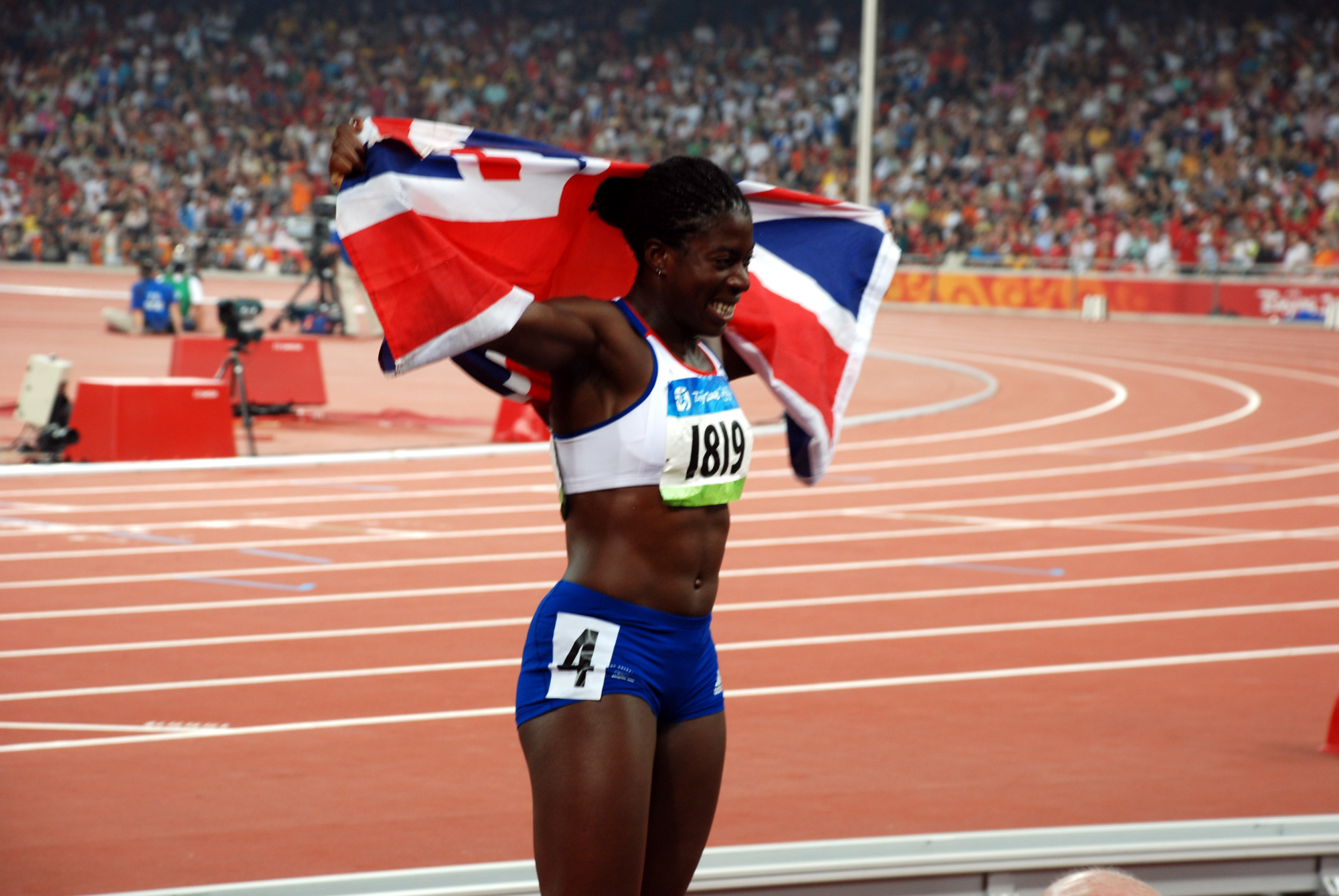
- Christine Ohuruogu after her victory
- Venue: Beijing National Stadium
- Dates: 16 August 2008 (heats); 17 August 2008 (semi-finals); 19 August 2008 (final)
- Competitors: 50 from 40 nations
- Winning time: 49.62 s

Medalists
1st place, gold medalist(s)		Christine Ohuruogu	Great Britain
2nd place, silver medalist(s)		Shericka Williams	Jamaica
3rd place, bronze medalist(s)		Sanya Richards	United States

The Women's 400 metres at the 2008 Summer Olympics took place on 16–19 August at the Beijing National Stadium. The winning margin was 0.07 seconds.

The qualifying standards were 51.55 s (A standard) and 52.35 s (B standard).

Favourites for the event included Sanya Richards-Ross and the reigning world champion, Christine Ohuruogu. In the final, Richards-Ross made a rapid start and quickly took the lead, while Ohuruogu ran a more even-paced race, but was well down the field entering the final straight. However, in the last 100 metres Richard-Ross, clearly tired from her earlier effort, began to tie up badly, while Ohuruogu began to surge through the field. At the line, Great Britain's Christine Ohuruogu won in 49.62 seconds to add the Olympic title to her World title, just pipping Shericka Williams by 0.07 seconds to take gold. Richards-Ross faded to third, and bronze, in 49.93.

== Records ==
Prior to this competition, the existing world record, Olympic record, and world leading time were as follows:

World record	(East Germany) Marita Koch (GDR)	47.60 s	Canberra, Australia	6 October 1985
Olympic record	Marie-José Pérec (FRA)	48.25 s	Atlanta, United States	29 July 1996
World Leading	Amantle Montsho (BOT)	49.83 s	Addis Ababa, Ethiopia	2 May 2008

No new world or Olympic records were set for this event.

== Results ==
=== Round 1 ===
Qualification: First 3 in each heat (Q) and the next 3 fastest (q) advance to the Semifinals.

Rank	Heat	Athlete	Nation	Time	Notes
1	5	Sanya Richards	United States	50.54	Q
2	7	Shericka Williams	Jamaica	50.57	Q
3	7	Tatiana Firova	Russia	50.59	DSQ
4	2	Libania Grenot Martinez	Italy	50.87	Q, NR
5	2	Amantle Montsho	Botswana	50.91	Q
6	5	Aliann Pompey	Guyana	50.99	Q, SB
7	1	Rosemarie Whyte	Jamaica	51.00	Q
7	4	Christine Ohuruogu	Great Britain	51.00	Q
9	4	Yulia Gushchina	Russia	51.18	Q
10	1	Christine Amertil	Bahamas	51.25	Q, SB
11	3	Anastasia Kapachinskaya	Russia	51.32	DSQ
12	1	Ajoke Odumosu	Nigeria	51.39	Q, PB
13	1	DeeDee Trotter	United States	51.41	q
14	5	Folashade Abugan	Nigeria	51.45	Q
15	3	Mary Wineberg	United States	51.46	Q
16	6	Novlene Williams	Jamaica	51.52	Q
17	2	Carline Muir	Canada	51.55	Q, PB
18	2	Indira Terrero	Cuba	51.56	q
19	7	Racheal Nachula	Zambia	50.62	Q
20	6	Nicola Sanders	Great Britain	51.81	Q
21	3	Lee McConnell	Great Britain	51.87	Q
22	4	Gabriela Medina	Mexico	51.96	Q
23	7	Joy Amechi Eze	Nigeria	51.97	q
24	2	Makelesi Bulikiobo	Fiji	52.24	SB
25	4	Tamsyn Lewis	Australia	52.38	
26	7	Alissa Kallinikou	Cyprus	52.40	
27	1	Tiandra Ponteen	Saint Kitts and Nevis	52.41	
28	5	Asami Tanno	Japan	52.60	
29	5	Dimitra Ntova	Greece	52.69	
30	6	Nawal El Jack	Sudan	52.77	Q
31	7	Monika Bejnar	Poland	52.80	
32	6	Kineke Alexander	Saint Vincent and the Grenadines	52.87	
33	2	Mandeep Kaur	India	52.88	
33	6	Trish Bartholomew	Grenada	52.88	
35	3	Barbara Petráhn	Hungary	53.06	
36	3	Carol Rodriguez	Puerto Rico	53.08	
37	1	Antonina Yefremova	Ukraine	53.22	
38	4	Maria Laura Almirao	Brazil	53.26	
39	4	Joanne Cuddihy	Ireland	53.32	
40	5	Olga Tereshkova	Kazakhstan	53.36	
41	3	Ginou Etienne	Haiti	53.94	
42	5	Kia Davis	Liberia	53.99	
43	6	Tsholofelo Thipe	South Africa	54.11	
44	2	Justine Bayigga	Uganda	54.15	
45	7	Sandrine Thiébaud-Kangni	Togo	54.16	
46	6	Klodiana Shala	Albania	54.84	
47	6	Munguntuya Batgerel	Mongolia	58.14	
48	7	Temalangeni Dlamini	Swaziland	59.91	
49	3	Rachidatou Seini Maikido	Niger	1:03.19	NR
50	4	Ghada Ali	Libya	1:06.19	

=== Semifinals ===
Qualification: First 2 in each heat (Q) and the next 2 fastest {q} advance to the Final.

Rank	Heat	Athlete	Nation	Time	Notes
1	2	Sanya Richards	United States	49.90	Q
2	1	Christine Ohuruogu	Great Britain	50.14	Q, SB
3	1	Shericka Williams	Jamaica	50.28	Q, SB
4	2	Anastasia Kapachinskaya	Russia	50.30	DSQ
5	1	Tatiana Firova	Russia	50.31	DSQ
6	3	Yulia Gushchina	Russia	50.48	Q
7	3	Amantle Montsho	Botswana	50.54	Q
8	3	Rosemarie Whyte	Jamaica	50.63	q
9	3	Nicola Sanders	Great Britain	50.71	SB
10	3	Libania Grenot Martinez	Italy	50.83	NR
11	1	Aliann Pompey	Guyana	50.93	=NR
12	2	Novlene Williams	Jamaica	51.06	
13	1	Mary Wineberg	United States	51.13	
14	3	Folashade Abugan	Nigeria	51.30	
15	2	Christine Amertil	Bahamas	51.51	
16	1	Indira Terrero	Cuba	51.80	
17	2	Joy Amechi Eze	Nigeria	51.87	
17	3	DeeDee Trotter	United States	51.87	
19	2	Lee McConnell	Great Britain	52.11	
20	2	Carline Muir	Canada	52.37	
21	1	Ajoke Odumosu	Nigeria	52.45	
22	2	Racheal Nachula	Zambia	52.67	
23	1	Gabriela Medina	Mexico	52.97	
24	3	Nawal El Jack	Sudan	54.18	

=== Final ===
Rank	Lane	Athlete	Nation	Time	Notes
1st place, gold medalist(s)	4	Christine Ohuruogu	Great Britain	49.62	WL
2nd place, silver medalist(s)	6	Shericka Williams	Jamaica	49.69	PB
3rd place, bronze medalist(s)	7	Sanya Richards	United States	49.93	
4	5	Yulia Gushchina	Russia	50.01	PB
5	2	Rosemarie Whyte	Jamaica	50.68	
6	8	Amantle Montsho	Botswana	51.18	
DSQ	9	Anastasia Kapachinskaya	Russia	~~50.03~~	PB
DSQ	3	Tatiana Firova	Russia	~~50.11~~	SB
