= Athletics at the 2003 Afro-Asian Games – Results =

These are the results of the athletics competition at the 2003 Afro-Asian Games which took place from October 28 to October 30, 2003 in Hyderabad, India.

== Men's results ==
=== 100 meters ===
October 30
Wind: -0.6 m/s

Rank	Name	Nationality	Time	Notes
1st place, gold medalist(s)	Olusoji Fasuba	Nigeria	10.15	
2nd place, silver medalist(s)	Tamunosiki Atorudibo	Nigeria	10.20	
3rd place, bronze medalist(s)	Shingo Suetsugu	Japan	10.36	
4	Gennadiy Chernovol	Kazakhstan	10.46	
5	Chen Haijian	China	10.52	
6	Chinnain Thirugnanadurai	India	10.75	
	Frankie Fredericks	Namibia	DNS	
	Oumar Loum	Senegal	DNS	

=== 200 meters ===
October 29
Wind: +0.8 m/s

Rank	Name	Nationality	Time	Notes
1st place, gold medalist(s)	Frankie Fredericks	Namibia	20.57	
2nd place, silver medalist(s)	Gennadiy Chernovol	Kazakhstan	20.81	
3rd place, bronze medalist(s)	Oumar Loum	Senegal	20.99	
4	Yang Yaozu	China	21.17	
5	Sittichai Suwonprateep	Thailand	21.21	
6	Bolaji Lawal	Nigeria	21.22	
7	Piyush Kumar	India	21.39	
8	Siapade Marius Loua	Ivory Coast	21.50	

=== 400 meters ===
October 28

Rank	Name	Nationality	Time	Notes
1st place, gold medalist(s)	Ezra Sambu	Kenya	45.04	
2nd place, silver medalist(s)	Nagmeldin Ali Abubakr	Sudan	45.44	
3rd place, bronze medalist(s)	Sugath Thilakaratne	Sri Lanka	45.99	
4	K. J. Manoj Lal	India	46.18	
5	Denis Rypakov	Kazakhstan	47.04	
6	Purukottam Ramchandran	India	47.05	
7	Lloyd Zvasiya	Zimbabwe	48.81	
	Vincent Mumo	Kenya	DNF	

=== 800 meters ===
October 30

Rank	Name	Nationality	Time	Notes
1st place, gold medalist(s)	Ismail Ahmed Ismail	Sudan	1:46.92	
2nd place, silver medalist(s)	Peter Roko Ashak	Sudan	1:47.48	
3rd place, bronze medalist(s)	Samuel Mwera	Tanzania	1:47.98	
4	Ghamanda Ram	India	1:48.56	
5	Sasidharan Punnakkatuseary	India	1:50.16	
6	John Lozada	Philippines	1:50.18	

=== 1500 meters ===
October 29

Rank	Name	Nationality	Time	Notes
1st place, gold medalist(s)	Abdalla Abdelgadir	Sudan	3:40.17	
2nd place, silver medalist(s)	Peter Roko Ashak	Sudan	3:40.21	
3rd place, bronze medalist(s)	Benjamin Kipkurui	Kenya	3:40.65	
4	Daniel Zegeye	Ethiopia	3:44.74	
5	Chaminda Indika Wijekoon	Sri Lanka	3:51.66	
6	Sunil Jayaweera	Sri Lanka	3:53.42	
7	Gulab Chand	India	3:53.90	
8	Sunil Kumar	India	3:57.92	

=== 5000 meters ===
October 28

Rank	Name	Nationality	Time	Notes
1st place, gold medalist(s)	Hailu Mekonnen	Ethiopia	13:49.08	
2nd place, silver medalist(s)	Markos Geneti	Ethiopia	13:49.61	
3rd place, bronze medalist(s)	Dennis Keter	Kenya	13:50.41	
4	John Yuda Msuri	Tanzania	13:54.30	
5	Aman Saini	India	14:13.38	
	Gulab Chand	India	DNF	

=== 10,000 meters ===
October 30

Rank	Name	Nationality	Time	Notes
1st place, gold medalist(s)	Sileshi Sihine	Ethiopia	27:48.40	
2nd place, silver medalist(s)	Gebregziabher Gebremariam	Ethiopia	28:08.79	
3rd place, bronze medalist(s)	Boniface Toroitich Kiprop	Uganda	28:12.67	
4	Dejene Berhanu	Ethiopia	28:37.57	
5	Aman Saini	India	32:00.72	
6	Shivanada Nandhombal	India	32:55.31	

=== 110 meters hurdles ===
October 30
Wind: -2.2 m/s

Rank	Name	Nationality	Time	Notes
1st place, gold medalist(s)	Todd Matthews-Jouda	Sudan	13.68	
2nd place, silver medalist(s)	Masato Naito	Japan	13.71	
3rd place, bronze medalist(s)	Park Tae-Kyong	South Korea	13.83	
4	Joseph-Berlioz Randriamihaja	Madagascar	13.94	
5	Cao Jing	China	14.01	
6	Naunidh Sekhun	India	14.26	
7	Dienma Afiesimama	Nigeria	14.37	
8	Félou Doudou Sow	Senegal	14.39	

=== 400 meters hurdles ===
October 28

Rank	Name	Nationality	Time	Notes
1st place, gold medalist(s)	Yevgeniy Meleshenko	Kazakhstan	49.66	
2nd place, silver medalist(s)	Ibou Faye	Senegal	50.08	
3rd place, bronze medalist(s)	Osita Okagu	Nigeria	50.87	
4	Vara Prasad Reddy Pureddy	India	51.31	
5	Apisit Kuttiyawan	Thailand	51.36	
6	Oumar Diarra	Mali	52.04	
7	Lensley Juhel	Mauritius	53.78	
8	Kanwar Rackesh Rockey	India	53.91	

=== 3000 meters steeplechase ===
October 29

Rank	Name	Nationality	Time	Notes
1st place, gold medalist(s)	John Kemboi	Kenya	8:56.43	
2nd place, silver medalist(s)	Arun D'Souza	India	9:05.97	
3rd place, bronze medalist(s)	Joel Chelimo	Kenya	9:24.08	
4	Gunarahtna Santha	Sri Lanka	9:53.87	
	Tewodros Shiferaw	Ethiopia	DNF	
	Jha Ranjan	India	DNS	

=== 4 × 100 meters relay ===
October 29

Rank	Nation	Athletes	Time	Notes
1st place, gold medalist(s)	Africa	Olusoji Fasuba, Tamunosiki Atorudibo, Saul Weigopwa, Frankie Fredericks	39.07	
2nd place, silver medalist(s)	Senegal	Abdou Demba Lam, Malang Sané, Jaques Sambou, Oumar Loum	39.58	
3rd place, bronze medalist(s)	India	Amit Saha, Chinnain Thirugnanadurai, Piyush Kumar, Sanjay Ghosh	39.64	
4	Thailand		39.85	
5	Ivory Coast		40.41	
6	Oman		41.30	

=== 4 × 400 meters relay ===
October 30

Rank	Nation	Athletes	Time	Notes
1st place, gold medalist(s)	Africa	Ezra Sambu, Osita Okagu, Nagmeldin Ali Abubakr, Ismail Ahmed Ismail	3:04.61	
2nd place, silver medalist(s)	Nigeria	Abayomi Agunbiade, Saul Weigopwa, James Godday, Bolaji Lawal	3:05.09	
3rd place, bronze medalist(s)	Zimbabwe	Crispen Mutakanyi, Temba Ncube, Talkmore Nyongani, Jeffrey Wilson	3:05.35	
4	India	Purukottam Ramchandran, Manoj Lal, Satbir Singh, Bhupinder Singh	3:05.76	
5	Thailand		3:06.94	
6	Philippines	Ernie Candelario, Jimar Aing, R. Marfil, R. Taniuan	3:07.78	
7	Sri Lanka	B. Pushpakumara, D.D. Neclaka, H.N Bandara, Manoj Pushpakumara	3:10.78	
	Senegal		DNS	

=== 10,000 meters walk ===
October 30

Rank	Name	Nationality	Time	Notes
1st place, gold medalist(s)	Moussa Aouanouk	Algeria	43:33.58	
2nd place, silver medalist(s)	Sitaram Basat	India	45:09.40	
3rd place, bronze medalist(s)	Sakchai Samutkao	Thailand	45:54.04	
4	Mohd Sharrulhaizy Abdul Rahman	Malaysia	47:30.82	
5	Kazeem Adeyemi	Nigeria	50:20.23	
6	Oluwole Odunuga	Nigeria	50:25.42	
	Gurdev Singh	India	DNF	
	Rezki Yahi	Algeria	DNF	

=== High jump ===
October 30

Rank	Name	Nationality	Result	Notes
1st place, gold medalist(s)	Cui Kai	China	2.18	
2nd place, silver medalist(s)	Samson Idiata	Nigeria	2.15	
3rd place, bronze medalist(s)	Jude Sidonie	Seychelles	2.10	
4	Obiora Arinze	Nigeria	2.05	
5	Khemraj Naiko	Mauritius	2.05	
6	Hari Shankar Roy	India	2.05	
7	Wang Zhouzhou	China	2.00	

=== Pole vault ===
October 28

Rank	Name	Nationality	Result	Notes
1st place, gold medalist(s)	Grigoriy Yegorov	Kazakhstan	5.25	
2nd place, silver medalist(s)	Karim Sène	Senegal	5.05	
3rd place, bronze medalist(s)	Rafik Mefti	Algeria	4.95	
4	Yang Mu-hui	Chinese Taipei	4.85	
5	Jitender Kumar	India	4.85	
	Jannie Botha	South Africa	NM	
	Fanie Jacobs	South Africa	NM	

=== Long jump ===
October 29

Rank	Name	Nationality	Result	Notes
1st place, gold medalist(s)	Nabil Adamou	Algeria	7.93	
2nd place, silver medalist(s)	Ndiss Kaba Badji	Senegal	7.86	
3rd place, bronze medalist(s)	Godfrey Khotso Mokoena	South Africa	7.76	
4	Zhou Can	China	7.49	
5	Sanjay Kumar Rai	India	7.42	
6	Wayne Peppin	India	7.29	
7	Olivier Sanou	Burkina Faso	7.11	

=== Triple jump ===
October 30

Rank	Name	Nationality	Result	Notes
1st place, gold medalist(s)	Takashi Komatsu	Japan	16.65	
2nd place, silver medalist(s)	Olivier Sanou	Burkina Faso	16.16	
3rd place, bronze medalist(s)	Godfrey Khotso Mokoena	South Africa	15.92	
4	Wu Ji	China	15.76	
5	Ndiss Kaba Badji	Senegal	15.61	
6	Lee Kang-min	South Korea	15.52	
7	Amajeet Singh	India	15.43	
8	Dominic Ekwemu	Nigeria	15.43	

=== Shot put ===
October 30

Rank	Name	Nationality	Result	Notes
1st place, gold medalist(s)	Shakti Singh	India	19.05	
2nd place, silver medalist(s)	Burger Lambrechts	South Africa	18.97	
3rd place, bronze medalist(s)	Navpreet Singh	India	18.81	
4	Bahadur Singh	India	18.68	
5	Chima Ugwu	Nigeria	18.42	
6	Satoshi Hatase	Japan	16.76	
7	Yasser Ibrahim Farag	Egypt	16.65	
8	Victor Omogberale	Nigeria	16.63	

=== Discus throw ===
October 29

Rank	Name	Nationality	Result	Notes
1st place, gold medalist(s)	Anil Kumar	India	60.68	
2nd place, silver medalist(s)	Chima Ugwu	Nigeria	59.87	
3rd place, bronze medalist(s)	Omar Ahmed El Ghazaly	Egypt	59.77	
4	Johannes van Wyk	South Africa	57.96	
5	Walid Boudaoui	Algeria	51.77	
	Gursewak Singh	India	DNS	

=== Hammer throw ===
October 30

Rank	Name	Nationality	Result	Notes
1st place, gold medalist(s)	Chris Harmse	South Africa	75.67	
2nd place, silver medalist(s)	Dilshod Nazarov	Tajikistan	69.72	
3rd place, bronze medalist(s)	Samir Haouam	Algeria	69.37	
4	Viktor Ustinov	Uzbekistan	66.41	
5	Ahmed Abderraouf	Egypt	66.15	
6	Pramod Kumar Tiwari	India	64.61	
7	Rakesh Rakesh	India	64.22	
	Mohsen El Anany	Egypt	DNS	

=== Javelin throw ===
October 29

Rank	Name	Nationality	Result	Notes
1st place, gold medalist(s)	Gerhardus Pienaar	South Africa	84.50	
2nd place, silver medalist(s)	Li Rongxiang	China	79.01	
3rd place, bronze medalist(s)	Jagdish Bishnoi	India	75.34	
4	Brian Erasmus	South Africa	75.23	
5	Park Jae-Myong	South Korea	73.10	
6	Willie Human	South Africa	70.28	
7	Jannie Botha	South Africa	59.11	

== Women's results ==
=== 100 meters ===
October 30
Wind: -1.6 m/s

Rank	Name	Nationality	Time	Notes
1st place, gold medalist(s)	Endurance Ojokolo	Nigeria	11.45	
2nd place, silver medalist(s)	Lyubov Perepelova	Uzbekistan	11.49	
3rd place, bronze medalist(s)	Delphine Atangana	Cameroon	11.49	
4	Geraldine Pillay	South Africa	11.60	
5	Saraswati Saha	India	11.68	
6	Guzel Khubbieva	Uzbekistan	11.74	
7	Qin Wangping	China	12.17	
	Emem Edem	Nigeria	DQ	

=== 200 meters ===
October 29
Wind: -0.8 m/s

Rank	Name	Nationality	Time	Notes
1st place, gold medalist(s)	Delphine Atangana	Cameroon	23.37	
2nd place, silver medalist(s)	Saraswati Saha	India	23.43	
3rd place, bronze medalist(s)	Geraldine Pillay	South Africa	23.48	
4	Estie Wittstock	South Africa	23.59	
5	Louise Ayétotché	Ivory Coast	23.71	
6	Lyubov Perepelova	Uzbekistan	23.77	
7	Chen Lisha	China	24.04	
	Guzel Khubbieva	Uzbekistan	DNS	

=== 400 meters ===
October 28

Rank	Name	Nationality	Time	Notes
1st place, gold medalist(s)	Estie Wittstock	South Africa	52.09	
2nd place, silver medalist(s)	Doris Jacob	Nigeria	53.08	
3rd place, bronze medalist(s)	Wassana Winatho	Thailand	53.88	
4	Tatyana Roslanova	Kazakhstan	53.89	
5	Jincy Phillip	India	54.95	
	Svetlana Bodritskaya	Kazakhstan	DNF	
	Glory Nwosu	Nigeria	DQ	
	Fatou Bintou Fall	Senegal	DNS	

=== 800 meters ===
October 30

Rank	Name	Nationality	Time	Notes
1st place, gold medalist(s)	Lwiza John	Tanzania	2:01.68	
2nd place, silver medalist(s)	Wang Yuanping	China	2:04.36	
3rd place, bronze medalist(s)	Berhane Herpassa	Ethiopia	2:05.31	
4	Grace Ebor	Nigeria	2:07.10	
5	Joy Eze	Nigeria	2:07.23	
6	Madhuri Singh	India	2:07.51	
7	Zamira Amirova	Uzbekistan	2:09.00	
8	Tomoko Matsushima	Japan	2:11.33	

=== 1500 meters ===
October 28

Rank	Name	Nationality	Time	Notes
1st place, gold medalist(s)	Berhane Herpassa	Ethiopia	4:17.36	
2nd place, silver medalist(s)	Kutre Dulecha	Ethiopia	4:18.14	
3rd place, bronze medalist(s)	Madhuri Singh	India	4:22.32	
4	Sunita Rani	India	4:22.60	
5	Liu Xiaoping	China	4:24.08	
6	Svetlana Lukasheva	Kazakhstan	4:26.31	
	Lwiza John	Tanzania	DNF	

=== 5000 meters ===
October 30

Rank	Name	Nationality	Time	Notes
1st place, gold medalist(s)	Meseret Defar	Ethiopia	15:47.69	
2nd place, silver medalist(s)	Tirunesh Dibaba	Ethiopia	15:48.21	
3rd place, bronze medalist(s)	Dorcus Inzikuru	Uganda	16:33.71	
4	Madhuri Gurunule	India	17:42.30	
5	Aruna Devi Laishram	India	17:52.72	
	Pushpa Devi	India	DNS	
	Sujeewa Nilmini Jayasena	Sri Lanka	DNS	

=== 10,000 meters ===
October 29

Rank	Name	Nationality	Time	Notes
1st place, gold medalist(s)	Ejegayehu Dibaba	Ethiopia	33:01.12	
2nd place, silver medalist(s)	Eyerusalem Kuma	Ethiopia	33:20.19	
3rd place, bronze medalist(s)	Sujeewa Jayasena	Sri Lanka	35:53.45	
4	Aruna Devi Laishram	India	37:56.82	
5	Pushpa Devi	India	38:08.74	

=== 100 meters hurdles ===
October 29
Wind: -1.0 m/s

Rank	Name	Nationality	Time	Notes
1st place, gold medalist(s)	Angela Atede	Nigeria	13.18	
2nd place, silver medalist(s)	Feng Yun	China	13.20	
3rd place, bronze medalist(s)	Damaris Agbugba	Nigeria	13.21	
4	Christy Akinremi	Nigeria	13.49	
5	Su Yiping	China	13.66	
6	Maria-Joëlle Conjungo	Central African Republic	13.94	
7	Priya Kadayamnatrajan	India	14.36	
	J. J. Shobha	India	DNF	

=== 400 meters hurdles ===
October 30

Rank	Name	Nationality	Time	Notes
1st place, gold medalist(s)	Natalya Torshina	Kazakhstan	55.81	
2nd place, silver medalist(s)	Yao Yuehua	China	56.29	
3rd place, bronze medalist(s)	Wassana Winatho	Thailand	57.09	
4	Aïssata Soulama	Burkina Faso	57.99	
5	Kate Chiwedu Obilor	Nigeria	57.99	
6	Carole Kaboud Mebam	Cameroon	58.47	
7	Chithra Chithu	India	1:01.37	
	Gnima Faye	Senegal	DNS	

=== 4 × 100 meters relay ===
October 29

Rank	Nation	Athletes	Time	Notes
1st place, gold medalist(s)	Africa I	Geraldine Pillay, Endurance Ojokolo, Chinedu Odozor, Emem Edem	43.75	
2nd place, silver medalist(s)	Africa II	Amandine Allou Affoue, Angela Atede, Louise Ayétotché, Delphine Atangana	43.86	
3rd place, bronze medalist(s)	Thailand	Sangwan Jaksunin, Jutamass Tawoncharoen, Pacharin Jandang, Sujirat Sukha	43.90	NR
4	India	K.M. Greeshma, Rakhi Saha, Poonam Tomar, Saraswati Saha	44.86	
5	Nigeria		45.09	
6	Uzbekistan		45.16	
7	Senegal		46.09	

=== 4 × 400 meters relay ===
October 30

Rank	Nation	Athletes	Time	Notes
1st place, gold medalist(s)	Africa I	Doris Jacob, Glory Nwosu, Estie Wittstock, Ngozi Nwokocha	3:29.75	
2nd place, silver medalist(s)	Africa II	Louise Ayétotché, Joy Eze, Kate Chiwedu Obilor, Lwiza Msyani John	3:32.16	
3rd place, bronze medalist(s)	Kazakhstan	Natalya Torshina, Svetlana Bodritskaya, Tatyana Roslanova, Olga Tereshkova	3:32.41	
4	India	Pinki Parmanik, Kalpana Reddy, Sathi Geetha, Jincy Phillip	3:33.78	
5	Thailand		3:38.36	

=== 10,000 meters walk ===
October 30

Rank	Name	Nationality	Time	Notes
1st place, gold medalist(s)	Bahia Boussad	Algeria	51:23.70	
2nd place, silver medalist(s)	Jasmine Kaur	India	51:36.60	
3rd place, bronze medalist(s)	Estle Viljoen	South Africa	52:01.30	
4	Geetha Nandani Gallage	Sri Lanka	52:58.80	
5	Amsale Yakob	Ethiopia	53:07.50	
6	Raveena Antil	India	54:43.90	
7	Yumnam Bala Devi	India	56:07.10	

=== High jump ===
October 28

Rank	Name	Nationality	Result	Notes
1st place, gold medalist(s)	Marina Aitova	Kazakhstan	1.88	
2nd place, silver medalist(s)	Bobby Aloysius	India	1.88	
3rd place, bronze medalist(s)	Marizca Gertenbach	South Africa	1.75	
4	Amina Lemgherbi	Algeria	1.70	
5	Anika Smit	South Africa	1.70	
6	Sahana Kumari	India	1.70	
7	Nneka Ukuh	Nigeria	1.70	

=== Pole vault ===
October 29

Rank	Name	Nationality	Result	Notes
1st place, gold medalist(s)	Zhang Na	China	4.10	
2nd place, silver medalist(s)	Annelie van Wyk	South Africa	4.00	
3rd place, bronze medalist(s)	Qin Xia	China	3.90	
4	Samantha Dodd	South Africa	3.80	
5	Chang Ko-hsin	Chinese Taipei	3.80	
6	Sureka Vazhalipillisur	India	3.20	
7	Karamjeet Kaur	India	3.20	
	Margaretha Du Plessis	South Africa	NM	

=== Long jump ===
October 29

Rank	Name	Nationality	Result	Notes
1st place, gold medalist(s)	Anju Bobby George	India	6.53	
2nd place, silver medalist(s)	Lerma Gabito	Philippines	6.30	
3rd place, bronze medalist(s)	Esther Aghatise	Nigeria	6.30	
4	Kadiatou Camara	Mali	6.30	
5	Marestella Torres	Philippines	6.29	
6	Grace Umelo	Nigeria	6.14	
	Chinedu Odozor	Nigeria	DNS	
	Liang Shuyan	China	DNS	

=== Triple jump ===
October 28

Rank	Name	Nationality	Result	Notes
1st place, gold medalist(s)	Huang Qiuyan	China	13.50	
2nd place, silver medalist(s)	Tatyana Bocharova	Kazakhstan	13.34	
3rd place, bronze medalist(s)	Salamatu Alimi	Nigeria	13.00	
4	Zhang Hao	China	12.85	
5	Linda Osifo	Nigeria	12.75	
6	Nkechi Mbaoma	Nigeria	12.52	
	Anju Bobby George	India	DQ	

=== Shot put ===
October 30

Rank	Name	Nationality	Result	Notes
1st place, gold medalist(s)	Li Meiju	China	17.61	
2nd place, silver medalist(s)	Li Fengfeng	China	17.21	
3rd place, bronze medalist(s)	Juthaporn Krasaeyan	Thailand	16.63	
4	Veronica Abrahamse	South Africa	16.60	
5	N. Latha	India	14.93	
6	Miriam Ibekwe	Nigeria	14.78	
7	Alifatou Djibril	Togo	14.73	
8	Wafaa Ismail Baghdadi	Egypt	14.66	
	Hiba Mecilhi	Egypt	DNS	

=== Discus throw ===
October 30

Rank	Name	Nationality	Result	Notes
1st place, gold medalist(s)	Neelam Jaswant Singh	India	61.94	
2nd place, silver medalist(s)	Li Yanfeng	China	60.42	
3rd place, bronze medalist(s)	Song Aimin	China	58.41	
4	Elizna Naudé	South Africa	56.93	
5	Harwant Kaur	India	53.36	
6	Anne Otutu	Nigeria	53.36	
7	Alifatou Djibril	Togo	52.00	
8	Hiba Mecilhi	Egypt	50.86	
9	Won Sun-Mi	South Korea	45.71	

=== Hammer throw ===
October 28

Rank	Name	Nationality	Result	Notes
1st place, gold medalist(s)	Liu Yinghui	China	68.03	
2nd place, silver medalist(s)	Zhao Wei	China	65.22	
3rd place, bronze medalist(s)	Marwa Hussein	Egypt	60.60	
4	Hardeep Kaur	India	58.11	
5	Olufunke Adeoye	Nigeria	56.07	
6	Ritu Rani	India	49.93	
7	Doris Ange Ratsimbazafy	Madagascar	48.69	

=== Javelin throw ===
October 28

Rank	Name	Nationality	Result	Notes
1st place, gold medalist(s)	Sunette Viljoen	South Africa	55.49	
2nd place, silver medalist(s)	Gurmeet Kaur	India	53.37	
3rd place, bronze medalist(s)	Ha Xiaoyan	China	51.96	
4	Sorochukwu Ihuefo	Nigeria	51.50	
5	Cecilia Kiplangat	Kenya	51.43	
6	Anne Maheshi De Silva	Sri Lanka	51.38	
7	Chang Jung-yeon	South Korea	51.19	
8	Lindy Leveaux	Seychelles	49.41	

=== Heptathlon ===
October 28–29

The highest mark recorded in each event is highlighted in yellow

Rank	Athlete	Nationality	100m H	HJ	SP	200m	LJ	JT	800m	Points	Notes
1st place, gold medalist(s)	J. J. Shobha	India	13.76	1.63	11.93	24.01	6.23	43.36	2:20.95	5884	
2nd place, silver medalist(s)	Justine Robbeson	South Africa	14.03	1.69	11.69	25.02	5.63	51.42	2:36.02	5587	
3rd place, bronze medalist(s)	Soma Biswas	India	14.19	1.63	10.83	24.90	5.97	41.22	2:21.86	5532	
4	Pramila Ganapathy	India	14.52	1.72	11.35	25.28	5.84	38.46	2:22.91	5487	
5	Watchaporan Masim	Thailand	14.70	1.66	10.75	27.15	5.27	38.40	2:58.60	4615	
6	Yuliya Tarasova	Uzbekistan	15.87	1.51	10.70	26.89	5.29	33.16	2:45.08	4351	
	Patience Okoro	Nigeria	14.52	1.63	12.25	25.87	DNS	–	–	DNF	
	Sarah Bouaoudia	Algeria	14.57	1.66	9.37	25.36	DNS	–	–	DNF	
