= 2006 African Championships in Athletics – Women's 4 × 400 metres relay =

The women's 4 × 400 metres relay event at the 2006 African Championships in Athletics was held at the Stade Germain Comarmond on August 13.

== Results ==
Rank	Nation	Competitors	Time	Notes
1st place, gold medalist(s)	South Africa	Amanda Kotze, Estie Wittstock, Janet Wienand, Heide Seyerling	3:36.88	
2nd place, silver medalist(s)	Nigeria	Alice Nwosu, Mary Onyemuwa, Kate Chiwedu Obilor, Christy Ekpukhon	3:37.00	
3rd place, bronze medalist(s)	Kenya	Josephine Nyarunda, Elizabeth Muthuka, Annet Mwanzi Lukhuyi, Florence Wasike	3:39.79	
4	Cameroon	Lucie Nadia Feumba, Esther Solange Ndoumbe, Nadège Essama Foe, Nathalie Sonia Itok	3:57.88	
