= Athletics at the 2003 All-Africa Games – Women's 800 metres =

The women's 800 metres at the 2003 All-Africa Games were held on October 14–15.

== Medalists ==
Gold	Silver	Bronze
Grace Ebor; Nigeria	Akosua Serwaa; Ghana	Lwiza Msyani John; Tanzania

== Results ==
=== Heats ===
Qualification: First 2 of each heat (Q) and the next 2 fastest (q) qualified for the semifinal.

Rank	Heat	Name	Nationality	Time	Notes
1	3	Lwiza John	Tanzania	2:02.18	Q
2	1	Faith Macharia	Kenya	2:02.60	Q
3	1	Joy Eze	Nigeria	2:02.80	Q
4	3	Tina Paulino	Mozambique	2:03.06	Q
5	2	Grace Ebor	Nigeria	2:03.07	Q
6	3	Alice Nwosu	Nigeria	2:03.22	q
7	2	Akosua Serwaa	Ghana	2:03.33	Q
8	3	Nahida Touhami	Algeria	2:03.80	q
9	1	Birhane Hirpasa	Ethiopia	2:04.00	
10	2	Janeth Jepkosgei	Kenya	2:05.12	
11	2	Leonor Piuza	Mozambique	2:05.19	
12	1	Dorcus Inzikuru	Uganda	2:06.40	
13	3	Meskerem Legesse	Ethiopia	2:07.36	
14	2	Gertrude Banda	Malawi	2:09.16	NR
15	3	Sharon Tavengwa	Zimbabwe	2:09.55	
16	1	Adama Ntie	Gambia	2:09.80	
17	2	Euridice Borges Semedo	São Tomé and Príncipe	2:11.59	
18	1	Dipa Traoré	Mali	2:16.10	
19	2	Berlick Bouranga Onsso	Republic of the Congo	2:29.20	
	3	Aicha Syvane Onsso	Guinea	DNS	

=== Final ===
Rank	Name	Nationality	Time	Notes
1st place, gold medalist(s)	Grace Ebor	Nigeria	2:02.04	
2nd place, silver medalist(s)	Akosua Serwaa	Ghana	2:02.40	
3rd place, bronze medalist(s)	Lwiza John	Tanzania	2:02.85	
4	Faith Macharia	Kenya	2:03.44	
5	Tina Paulino	Mozambique	2:04.27	
6	Alice Nwosu	Nigeria	2:05.45	
7	Joy Eze	Nigeria	2:06.17	
8	Nahida Touhami	Algeria	2:06.32	
