= Nwosu =

- Gender: Male
- Language: Igbo

Origin
- Origin: Igbo
- Meaning: Child dedicated to the gods
- Region of origin: Igboland

Nwosu // is a common surname of Igbo origin, which means "child dedicated to the gods".

== Notable people ==
- Alice Nwosu (born 1984), Nigerian runner
- Chinyere Ike Nwosu, Nigerian politician
- Henry Nwosu (1963–2026), Nigerian football manager
- Julius Nwosu (born 1971), Nigerian basketball player
- Ken Nwosu, British actor
- Nwankwo Christian Nwosu Kanu (born 1976), Nigerian footballer
- Uchenna Nwosu (born 1996), American football player
