= Athletics at the 2007 All-Africa Games – Women's 4 × 400 metres relay =

The women's 4 × 400 metres relay at the 2007 All-Africa Games was held on July 22.

== Results ==
Rank	Nation	Athletes	Time	Notes
1st place, gold medalist(s)	Nigeria	Folashade Abugan, Joy Eze, Sekinat Adesanya, Christy Ekpukhon	3:29.74	
2nd place, silver medalist(s)	South Africa	Estie Wittstock, Amanda Kotze, Tihanna Vorster, Tsholofelo Selemela	3:33.62	
3rd place, bronze medalist(s)	Sudan	Nawal El Jack, Faiza Omar, Hind Musa, Mona Jabir Adam	3:34.84	NR
4	Senegal	Mame Fatou Faye, Seynabou Paye, Ndeye Fatou Soumah, Fatou Bintou Fall	3:34.88	
5	Kenya	Elisabeth Muthoka, Josephine Nyarunda, Zipporah Ratemo, Charity Wandia	3:37.37	
6	Algeria	Amel Zigher, Zehra Bouras, Souheir Bouali, Houria Moussa	3:39.84	
7	Zimbabwe	Sandra Chimwaza, Tamla Denise Pietersen, Sheron Tavengwa, Sophia Chirairo	3:49.62	
8	Rwanda	Epiphanie Uwintije, Lamberte Nyabamikazi, Clementine Nyiraguhirwa, Jeanne d'Arc Uwamahoro	4:01.16	
