= Amanda Kotze =

South African sprinter (born 1986)

Medal record

Women's athletics

Representing South Africa

All-Africa Games
| Silver medal – second place | 2007 Algiers | 4×400 m |

African Championships
| Gold medal – first place | 2006 Bambous | 4×400 m |

Amanda Kotze (born 26 February 1986) is a retired South African sprinter who specialized in the 400 metres.

Individually she competed at the 2003 World Youth Championships and the 2004 World Junior Championships, then finished sixth at the 2006 African Championships and competed at the 2007 All-Africa Games without reaching the final.

At the 2004 World Junior Championships she also competed in the 4 × 100 metres and the 4 × 400 metres relay. The team with Kotze as a member also competed in 4 × 400 metres relay at the 2005 World Championships and the 2006 Commonwealth Games, won the gold medal at the 2006 African Championships and silver medal at the 2007 All-Africa Games.

Her personal best time was 52.76 seconds, achieved at the 2007 All-Africa Games.
