= Athletics at the 2003 Summer Universiade – Women's 400 metres =

The women's 400 metres event at the 2003 Summer Universiade was held in Daegu, South Korea with the final on 25–27 August.

== Medalists ==
Gold	Silver	Bronze
Tatyana Firova; Russia	Mariya Lisnichenko; Russia	Estie Wittstock; South Africa

== Results ==
=== Heats ===
Rank	Heat	Athlete	Nationality	Time	Notes
1	1	Mariya Lisnichenko	Russia	52.60	Q
2	1	Lesley Owusu	Great Britain	53.39	Q
3	3	Estie Wittstock	South Africa	53.40	Q
4	1	Joanne Cuddihy	Ireland	53.68	q
5	2	Tatyana Firova	Russia	53.98	Q
6	3	Awatef Ben Hassine	Tunisia	54.04	Q
7	2	Huang Xiaoxiao	China	54.67	Q
8	3	Rachel Signal	New Zealand	54.70	q
9	3	Saowalee Kaewchuay	Thailand	55.06	
10	3	Danielle Halsall	Great Britain	55.12	
11	1	Houria Moussa	Algeria	55.38	
12	2	Jackie-Ann Morain	Grenada	56.10	
13	2	Saipin Kaewsorn	Thailand	56.72	
14	1	Kim Dong-hyun	South Korea	56.95	
15	3	Vasiti Vatureba	Fiji	57.32	
16	3	Sônia Ficagna	Brazil	57.46	
17	2	Sarah Johnston	New Zealand	57.48	
18	1	Sudat Massau	Uganda	58.62	
19	3	Catherine Angwech	Uganda	1:01.33	
20	2	Mari Luz Obono Ndong	Equatorial Guinea	1:03.46	
21	2	Libin Abukar Mar	Somalia	1:11.07	
22	1	Silva Da	Timor-Leste	1:14.85	
23	1	Wongani Lornifar Chirwa	Malawi	1:19.57	
	2	Safiaiou Kalanga	Democratic Republic of the Congo	DNS	

=== Final ===
Rank	Lane	Athlete	Nationality	Time	Notes
1st place, gold medalist(s)	2	Tatyana Firova	Russia	51.81	
2nd place, silver medalist(s)	5	Mariya Lisnichenko	Russia	52.54	
3rd place, bronze medalist(s)	6	Estie Wittstock	South Africa	52.86	
4	4	Joanne Cuddihy	Ireland	52.94	
5	3	Lesley Owusu	Great Britain	53.37	
6	1	Awatef Ben Hassine	Tunisia	53.80	
7	7	Huang Xiaoxiao	China	54.60	
8	8	Rachel Signal	New Zealand	54.95	
