= Olivier Sanou =

Medal record

Men's athletics

Representing Burkina Faso

African Championships
Gold medal – first place	2002 Radès	Triple jump
Gold medal – first place	2004 Brazzaville	Triple jump
Bronze medal – third place	1996 Yaoundé	High jump
Bronze medal – third place	2000 Algiers	Triple jump

Olivier Sanou (born July 2, 1975) is a retired Burkinan track and field athlete. He was a high jumper before specializing in the triple jump in the late 1990s. A double African champion, Sanou made his mark in Africa. He competed at the 2004 Summer Olympics, but failed to qualify for the final.

== Competition record ==
Year	Competition	Venue	Position	Event	Notes
Representing Burkina Faso
1994	African Junior Championships	Algiers, Algeria	5th	High jump	2.00 m
1996	African Championships	Yaoundé, Cameroon	3rd	High jump	2.13 m
1996	Olympic Games	Atlanta, United States	–	High jump	NM
1997	Jeux de la Francophonie	Antananarivo, Madagascar	3rd	High jump	2.15 m
1999	All-Africa Games	Johannesburg, South Africa	5th	Triple jump	15.74 m
2000	African Championships	Algiers, Algeria	3rd	Triple jump	16.31 m
2001	Jeux de la Francophonie	Ottawa, Canada	4th	Triple jump	15.84 m
2002	Africa Military Games	Nairobi, Kenya	1st	Triple jump	
2002	African Championships	Radès, Tunisia	1st	Triple jump	17.06 m (w)
2003	World Championships	Paris, France	22nd (q)	Triple jump	16.23 m
2003	All-Africa Games	Abuja, Nigeria	3rd	Triple jump	16.21 m
2003	Afro-Asian Games	Hyderabad, India	7th	Long jump	7.11 m
2003	Afro-Asian Games	Hyderabad, India	2nd	Triple jump	16.16 m
2004	World Indoor Championships	Budapest, Hungary	20th (q)	Triple jump	16.09 m
2004	African Championships	Brazzaville, Congo	1st	Triple jump	16.31 m
2004	Olympic Games	Athens, Greece	41st (q)	Triple jump	15.67 m

== Personal bests ==
- High jump - 2.15 m (1997) – national record is 2.22 m
- Long jump - 7.48 m (2002) – national record is 8.00 m
- Triple jump - 16.91 m (2003) – national record
