= Athletics at the 2003 All-Africa Games – Women's 400 metres hurdles =

The women's 400 metres hurdles at the 2003 All-Africa Games were held on October 14.

== Results ==
=== Final ===
| Rank | Name | Nationality | Time | Notes |
|---|---|---|---|---|
| 1st place, gold medalist(s) | Omolade Akinremi | Nigeria | 56.98 | |
| 2nd place, silver medalist(s) | Kate Obilor | Nigeria | 57.53 | |
| 3rd place, bronze medalist(s) | Carole Kaboud Mebam | Cameroon | 58.28 | |
| 4 | Aïssata Soulama | Burkina Faso | 58.94 | |
| 5 | Kerryn Hulsen | South Africa | 1:00.75 | |
| 6 | Salhate Djamaldine | Comoros | 1:01.82 | |
| 7 | Clémence Kombetto | Benin | 1:03.76 | |
| | Elizabeth Ndubueze | Nigeria | DNF | |
