= Athletics at the 2003 All-Africa Games – Men's triple jump =

The men's triple jump event at the 2003 All-Africa Games was held on October 11.

== Results ==
Rank	Name	Nationality	Result	Notes
1st place, gold medalist(s)	Andrew Owusu	Ghana	16.41	
2nd place, silver medalist(s)	Godfrey Khotso Mokoena	South Africa	16.28	
3rd place, bronze medalist(s)	Olivier Sanou	Burkina Faso	16.21	
4	Ndiss Kaba Badji	Senegal	16.18	
5	Dominic Ukweme	Nigeria	16.02	
6	Didier Akotia Tchalla	Togo	15.79	
7	Bright Ugbama	Nigeria	15.78	
8	Abdou Demba Lam	Senegal	15.77	
9	Thierry Adanabou	Burkina Faso	15.45	
10	Remmy Limo	Kenya	15.38	
11	Dikibo Fiberesima	Nigeria	14.35	
12	Florac Elemba Owaka	Republic of the Congo	14.25	
	Tuan Wreh	Liberia	DNS	
