= Adri Schoeman =

South African sprinter (born 1970)

Medal record

Women's athletics

Representing South Africa

African Championships
Silver medal – second place	1993 Durban	4×400 m
Silver medal – second place	2004 Brazzaville	4×100 metres
Silver medal – second place	2004 Brazzaville	4×400 metres

Adri (de Jongh) Schoeman (born 13 July 1970) is a retired South African sprinter who specialized in the 400 metres.

She competed in both 200 and 400 metres at the 1994 Commonwealth Games without reaching the final, and also in 400 metres at the 1997 World Championships without even finishing the race. At the 2004 African Championships she won silver medals in both 4 × 100 metres relay and 4 × 400 metres relay, the latter in a South African record, and at the 2006 Commonwealth Games she competed in the 400 metres and the 4 × 400 metres relay.

Her personal best time was 51.70 seconds, achieved in April 1997 in Pretoria.
