= Hamza Ménina =

Algerian triple jumper

Medal record

Men's athletics

Representing Algeria

African Championships
| Silver medal – second place | 2004 Brazzaville | Triple jump |

Hamza Ménina (born 1981) is a retired Algerian triple jumper.

He finished sixth at the 2002 African Championships, won the silver medal at the 2004 African Championships, and the bronze medal at the 2005 Islamic Solidarity Games.

His personal best jump is 16.04 metres, achieved in October 2004 in Algiers.
