= Estie Wittstock =

South African sprinter (born 1980)

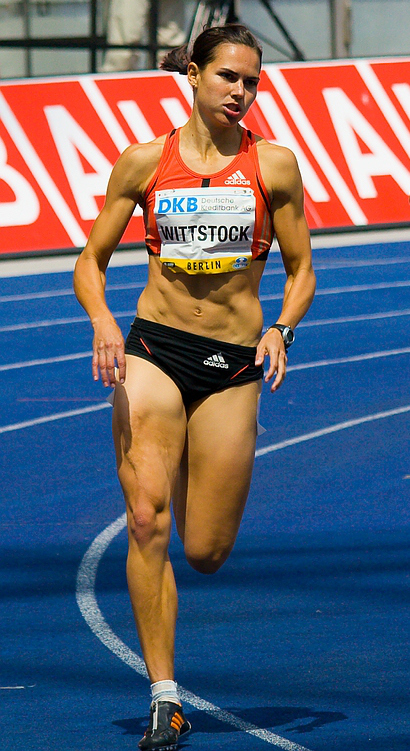
- Estie Wittstock

Medal record

Women's athletics

Representing South Africa

African Championships
Gold medal – first place	2006 Bambous	4×400 m
Silver medal – second place	2004 Brazzaville	4×400 m
Silver medal – second place	2010 Nairobi	200 m

Estie Wittstock (born 15 September 1980) is a South African sprinter who specialises in the 400 metres.

== Competition record ==
Year	Competition	Venue	Position	Event	Notes
Representing South Africa
1998	World Junior Championships	Annecy, France	5th	400m	53.16
1998	World Junior Championships	Annecy, France	6th	4 × 100 m relay	45.67
1998	World Junior Championships	Annecy, France	9th (h)	4 × 400 m relay	3:39.44
2003	Universiade	Daegu, South Korea	3rd	400 m	52.86
2003	All-Africa Games	Abuja, Nigeria	3rd	200 m	23.46
2003	All-Africa Games	Abuja, Nigeria	4th	400 m	51.81
2003	Afro-Asian Games	Hyderabad, India	4th	200 m	23.59
2003	Afro-Asian Games	Hyderabad, India	1st	400 m	52.09
2004	African Championships	Brazzaville, Republic of the Congo	6th	400 m	51.85
2004	African Championships	Brazzaville, Republic of the Congo	2nd	4 × 400 m relay	3:30.12
2004	Olympic Games	Athens, Greece	18th (h)	400 m	51.77
2005	World Championships	Helsinki, Finland	38th (h)	400 m	53.28
2005	World Championships	Helsinki, Finland	12th (h)	4 × 400 m relay	3:31.71
2006	Commonwealth Games	Melbourne, Australia	9th (h)	400 m	52.49
2006	Commonwealth Games	Melbourne, Australia	–	4 × 400 m relay	DQ
2006	African Championships	Bambous, Mauritius	8th	400 m	54.34
2006	African Championships	Bambous, Mauritius	1st	4 × 400 m relay	3:36.88
2007	All-Africa Games	Algiers, Algeria	6th	400 m	52.56
2007	All-Africa Games	Algiers, Algeria	2nd	4 × 400 m relay	3:33.62
2010	African Championships	Nairobi, Kenya	2nd	200 m	23.50
2010	African Championships	Nairobi, Kenya	5th	400 m	52.60
2012	African Championships	Porto-Novo, Benin	7th	400 m	52.84
2012	African Championships	Porto-Novo, Benin	4th	4 × 400 m relay	3:33.21

== Personal bests ==
- 100 m – 11.55 (+0.8) (Potchefstroom 2008)
- 200 m – 23.31 (+1.0) (Potchefstroom 2004)
- 400 m – 51.48 (Belém 2004)
