= Nawal El Jack =

Sudanese sprinter (born 1988)

Medal record

Women's athletics

Representing Sudan

Pan Arab Games
Gold medal – first place	2007 Cairo	400 m
Gold medal – first place	2007 Cairo	4 × 400 m
Silver medal – second place	2007 Cairo	200 m
Silver medal – second place	2007 Cairo	4 × 100 m
Silver medal – second place	2011 Doha	400 m
Silver medal – second place	2011 Doha	4 × 400 m

Malbas Jamous Nawal El Jack (Arabic: ملبس جاموس نوال الجاك; born 17 October 1988 in Khartoum) is a Sudanese sprinter who specializes in the 400 metres. She represented her nation at the 2008 Summer Olympics.

== International competitions ==
Year	Competition	Venue	Position	Event	Notes
Representing Sudan
2005	World Youth Championships	Marrakesh, Morocco	1st	400 m	51.19
2005	World Championships	Helsinki, Finland	15th (sf)	400 m	51.85
2006	World Junior Championships	Beijing, China	3rd	400 m	51.67
2007	All-Africa Games	Algiers, Algeria	4th	400 m	51.83
2007	All-Africa Games	Algiers, Algeria	3rd	4 × 400 m relay	3:34.84 (NR)
2007	World Championships	Osaka, Japan	40th (h)	400 m	55.29
2007	Pan Arab Games	Cairo, Egypt	2nd	200 m	24.25
2007	Pan Arab Games	Cairo, Egypt	1st	400 m	54.15
2007	Pan Arab Games	Cairo, Egypt	2nd	4 × 100 m relay	47.43 (NR)
2007	Pan Arab Games	Cairo, Egypt	1st	4 × 400 m relay	3:38.56
2008	African Championships	Addis Ababa, Ethiopia	5th	400 m	51.93
2008	African Championships	Addis Ababa, Ethiopia	6th	4 × 400 m relay	3:45.07
2008	Olympic Games	Beijing, China	24th (sf)	400 m	54.18
2010	African Championships	Nairobi, Kenya	7th	400 m	53.80
2011	Pan Arab Games	Doha, Qatar	2nd	400 m	55.14
2011	Pan Arab Games	Doha, Qatar	2nd	4 × 400 m	3:45.91
2015	African Games	Brazzaville, Republic of the Congo	26th (h)	400 m	61.51

=== Personal bests ===
- 200 metres – 23.97 s (2005)
- 400 metres – 51.19 s (2005)
- 400 metres hurdles – 57.86 s (2005)
