= 2002 African Championships in Athletics – Men's triple jump =

The men's triple jump event at the 2002 African Championships in Athletics was held in Radès, Tunisia on August 10.

== Results ==
Rank	Name	Nationality	Result	Notes
1st place, gold medalist(s)	Olivier Sanou	Burkina Faso	17.06w	
2nd place, silver medalist(s)	Andrew Owusu	Ghana	17.02w	
3rd place, bronze medalist(s)	Abdou Demba Lam	Senegal	16.34w	
4	Akotia Tchalla	Togo	16.07w	
5	Arslan Belkhir	Algeria	15.95w	
6	Hamza Menina	Algeria	15.86w	
7	Tuan Wreh	Liberia	15.78w	
8	Abdallah Machraoui	Tunisia	14.80w	
9	Yvon Ngova Ngema	Gabon	14.77w	
10	Thamer Haouini	Tunisia	14.57w	
11	Mohamed Gomri	Tunisia	14.26w	
	Ndiss Kaba Badji	Senegal	DNS	
