= Grace Ebor =

Nigerian middle-distance runner

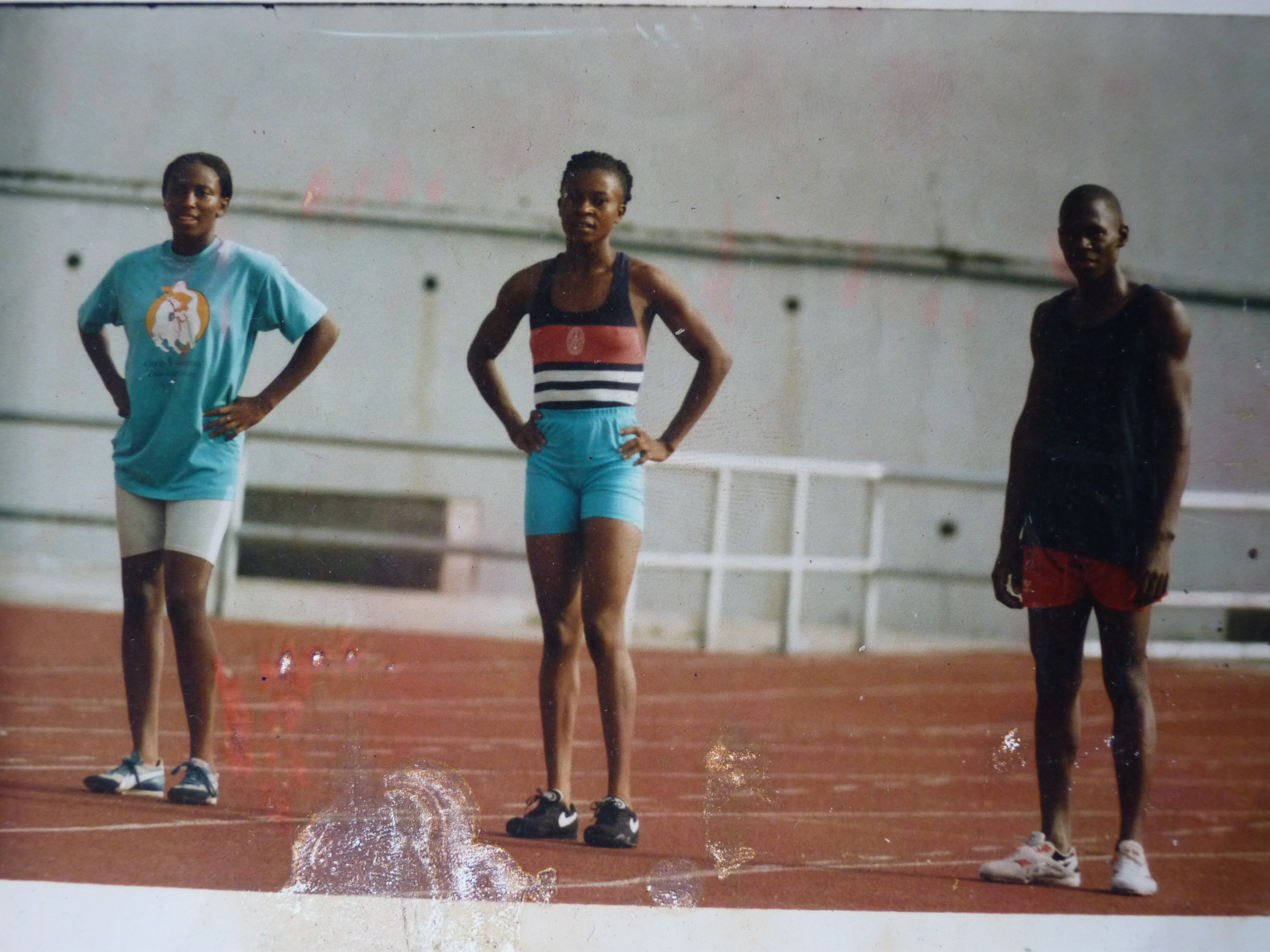
Grace Ebor in 2002, training in Calabar with colleagues Nwokeye and Sooter

Grace Ebor (born 8 August 1977) is a Nigerian retired athlete who specialised in the middle-distance events. She won the gold medal in the 800 metres at the 2003 All-Africa Games.

She has personal best of 2:02.04 in the 800 metres (2003) and 4:28.17 in the 1500 metres (2005).

== Competition record ==
Year	Competition	Venue	Position	Event	Notes
Representing Nigeria
2002	Commonwealth Games	Manchester, United Kingdom	11th (sf)	800 m	2:03.65
2002	Commonwealth Games	Manchester, United Kingdom	16th (h)	1500 m	4:29.16
2003	All-Africa Games	Abuja, Nigeria	1st	800 m	2:02.04
2003	Afro-Asian Games	Hyderabad, India	4th	800 m	2:07.10
2005	Universiade	İzmir, Turkey	11th (sf)	800 m	2:06.63
2005	Universiade	İzmir, Turkey	16th (h)	1500 m	4:28.17
2006	African Championships	Bambous, Mauritius	12th (h)	800 m	2:10.40
