= Akotia Tchalla =

Togolese triple jumper (born 1981)

Personal information
- Full name: Didier Akotia Tchalla
- Born: 1981 (age 44–45) Togo

Sport
- Country: Togo
- Sport: Athletics
- Event(s): long jump, triple jump

Didier Akotia Tchalla (born 28 July 1981) is a retired Togolese triple jumper.

== Career ==
He finished fourth at the 2002 African Championships, sixth at the 2003 All-Africa Games, sixth at the 2005 Jeux de la Francophonie, ninth at the 2005 Islamic Solidarity Games and sixth at the 2006 African Championships.

His personal best jump is 16.18 metres, achieved in February 2003 in Port Elizabeth. This is the Togolese record.

== Personal best ==
Event	Result	Venue	Date
Outdoor
Long jump	7.41 m	(Senegal) Dakar	24 May 2003
Triple jump	16.18 m	(South Africa) Port Elizabeth	28 February 2003
Indoor
Triple jump	14.92 m	(France) Salon-de-Provence	13 December 2008
