= Caitlin Willis =

Australian sprinter

Caitlin Willis-Pincott
Personal information
- Full name: Caitlin Louise Willis
- Born: 18 December 1982 (age 43) Mackay, Australia

Sport
- Country: Australia
- Sport: Track and field
- Retired: 2012
Medal record
Track and field
Representing Australia
Commonwealth Games
Gold medal – first place	2006 Melbourne	Women's 4 × 400 m relay

Caitlin Louise Willis-Pincott (born 18 December 1982) is a former Australian sprinter who competed in international level events. Her highest achievement is winning a gold medal at the 2006 Commonwealth Games in Melbourne in the 4 × 400 m relay. She has also competed at the 2009 and 2011 IAAF World Championships.

She is the younger sister of Benita Willis who also competed at the 2006 Commonwealth Games.
