= 2004 African Championships in Athletics – Men's triple jump =

The men's triple jump event at the 2004 African Championships in Athletics was held in Brazzaville, Republic of the Congo on July 18.

== Results ==
Rank	Name	Nationality	Result	Notes
1st place, gold medalist(s)	Olivier Sanou	Burkina Faso	16.31	
2nd place, silver medalist(s)	Hamza Menina	Algeria	16.02	
3rd place, bronze medalist(s)	Thierry Adanabou	Burkina Faso	15.93	
4	Farel Mépandy	Republic of the Congo	15.88	NR
5	Hugo Mamba-Schlick	Cameroon	15.75	
6	Abdou Demba Lam	Senegal	15.73	
7	Florac Elemba Owaka	Republic of the Congo	15.52	
8	Harry Kharigub	Namibia	14.31	
