= Joy Eze =

Nigerian sprinter

Personal information
- Full name: Joy Amechi Eze
- Nationality: Nigerian
- Citizenship: Nigeria
- Born: 23 April 1988 (age 38)
- Occupation: Athlete
Medal record
Women's athletics
Representing Nigeria
African Championships
| Gold medal – first place | 2008 Addis Ababa | 4×400 m |

Joy Amechi Eze (born 23 April 1988) is a Nigerian sprinter who specializes in the 400 metres. Her personal best time is 51.20 seconds, set during the 2007 All-Africa Games

== Awards ==
In 2006, she won silver medals in 4 × 400 metres relay at the 2006 Commonwealth Games and the 2006 World Junior Championships. At the 2007 All-Africa Games she won the silver medal in 400 m and a 4 × 400 metres relay gold medal. At the 2008 African Championships she finished sixth in 400 m and won another 4 × 400 metres gold medal.

== International career ==
Eze also competed individually at the 2006 Commonwealth Games and the 2007 World Championships without reaching the finals.

== Achievements ==
| Year | Competition | Venue | Position | Event | Notes |
Representing Nigeria
| 2003 | All-Africa Games | Abuja, Nigeria | 7th | 800 m | 2:06.17 |
| 2003 | Afro-Asian Games | Hyderabad, India | 5th | 800 m | 2:07.23 |
| 2006 | Commonwealth Games | Melbourne, Australia | 10th (sf) | 400 m | 52.51 |
| 2006 | Commonwealth Games | Melbourne, Australia | 2nd | 4 × 400 m relay | 3:31.83 |
| 2006 | World Junior Championships | Beijing, China | 2nd | 4 × 400 m relay | 3:30.84 |
| 2007 | All-Africa Games | Algiers, Algeria | 2nd | 400 m | 51.20 |
| 2007 | All-Africa Games | Algiers, Algeria | 1st | 4 × 400 m relay | 3:29.74 |
| 2007 | World Championships | Osaka, Japan | 33rd (h) | 400 m | 53.83 |
| 2008 | African Championships | Addis Ababa, Ethiopia | 6th | 400 m | 52.16 |
| 2008 | African Championships | Addis Ababa, Ethiopia | 1st | 4 × 400 m relay | 3:30.07 |
| 2008 | Olympic Games | Beijing, China | 17th (sf) | 400 m | 51.87 |
| 2008 | Olympic Games | Beijing, China | 7th | 4 × 400 m relay | 3:23.74 |
