= Kate Obilor =

Nigerian hurdler

Medal record

Women's athletics

Representing Nigeria

All-Africa Games
Silver medal – second place	2003 Abuja	400 m hurdles

African Championships
Silver medal – second place	2006 Bambous	4×400 m

Kate Chiwedu Obilor (born 17 July 1985) is a retired Nigerian hurdler who specialized in the 400 metres hurdles.

She won the gold medal at the 2001 West African Championships, the silver medal at the 2003 All-Africa Games, finished fifth at the 2006 African Championships and also won a silver medal in the 4 × 400 metres relay there.

Her personal best time was 56.50 seconds, achieved in July 2001 in Lagos.
