= Kou Luogon =

Liberian athlete (born 1984)

Medal record

Women's athletics

Representing Liberia

All-Africa Games
Bronze medal – third place	2011 Maputo	400 m hurdles

Kou Luogon (born 11 June 1984) is a Liberian athlete who specializes in the 400 metres and the 400 metre hurdles.

She finished seventh at the 2006 African Championships. She also competed at the 2005 World Championships, the 2009 World Championships and the 2010 World Indoor Championships without reaching the final.

Her personal best times are 52.47 seconds in the 400 metres, achieved in May 2006 in Knoxville; and 55.55 in the 400 metre hurdles, achieved in May 2009 in Baie-Mahault.
