= Alice Nwosu =

Nigerian runner

Personal information
- Born: 24 December 1984 (age 41)

Sport
- Sport: Track and field
Medal record
Representing Nigeria
African Championships
Silver medal – second place	2006 Bambous	4×400 m

Alice Nwosu (born 24 December 1984) is a retired Nigerian runner who specialized in the 400 and 800 metres.

She finished fifth in the 800 metres at the 2003 All-Africa Games, won a silver medal in the 4 × 400 metres relay at the 2006 African Championships and competed in the 400 metres at the 2006 African Championships without reaching the final.

Her personal best times were 53.05 seconds, achieved in March 2002 in Bamako; and 2:02.79 minutes, achieved in July 2001 in Lagos.
