= Rosemarie Whyte =

Jamaican sprinter

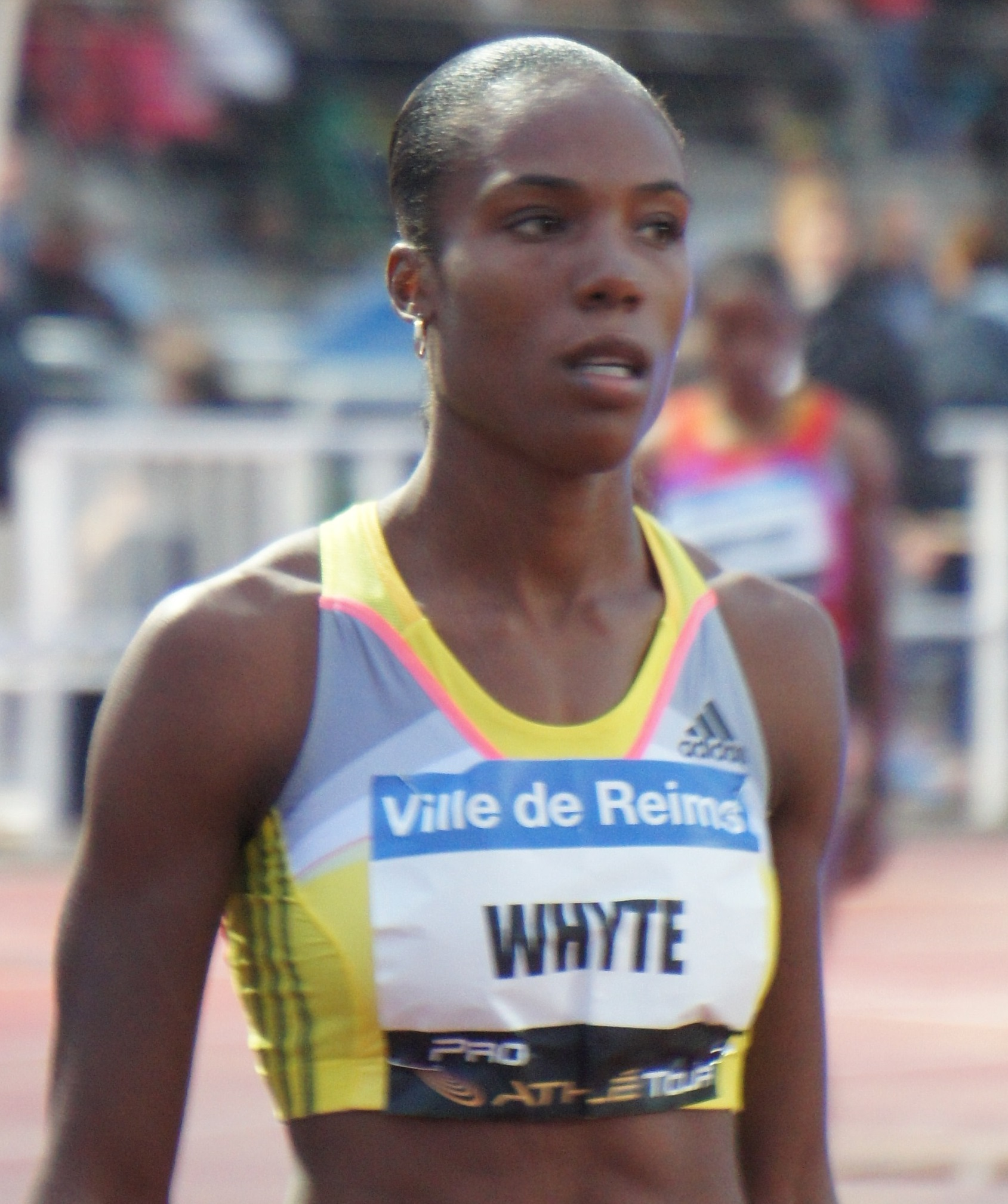
- Whyte in 2013

Personal information
- Born: 8 September 1986 (age 39) Bunkers Hill, Jamaica, West Indies
- Height: 1.8 m (5 ft 11 in)
- Weight: 64 kg (141 lb)

Sport
- Country: Jamaica
- Sport: Athletics
- Event: 4 × 400m Relay
Medal record
Olympic Games
Silver medal – second place	2008 Beijing	4×400 m relay
Silver medal – second place	2012 London	4×400 m relay
World Championships
Silver medal – second place	2009 Berlin	4x400 m relay
Silver medal – second place	2011 Daegu	4x400 m relay
CARIFTA Games Youth (U17)
Gold medal – first place	2002 Nassau	4x400 m relay

Rosemarie Whyte (born 8 September 1986) is the 2008 Jamaican national 400m champion. She represented Jamaica at the 2008 Olympic Games in Beijing, China, and at the 2012 Summer Olympics in London, Great Britain. At both Olympics she was part of the bronze medal-winning Jamaican 4 × 400 m teams.

== Competition record ==
Year	Competition	Venue	Position	Event	Notes
Representing Jamaica
2002	CARIFTA Games (U17)	Nassau, Bahamas	1st	4 × 400 m relay	3:44.18
2006	NACAC U-23 Championships	Santo Domingo, Dominican Republic	6th	100m	11.74 (wind: +1.0 m/s)
2006	NACAC U-23 Championships	Santo Domingo, Dominican Republic	5th	Long jump	5.96 m (wind: +0.5 m/s)
2006	Central American and Caribbean Games	Cartagena, Colombia	12th (h)	100 m	11.65
2008	Olympic Games	Beijing, China	7th	400 m	50.68
2008	Olympic Games	Beijing, China	2nd	4 × 400 m relay	3:20.40
2009	World Championships	Berlin, Germany	2nd	4 × 400 m relay	3:21.15
2011	World Championships	Daegu, South Korea	10th (sf)	400 m	50.90
2011	World Championships	Daegu, South Korea	2nd	4 × 400 m relay	3:18.71 (NR)
2012	Olympic Games	London, United Kingdom	7th	400 m	50.79
2012	Olympic Games	London, United Kingdom	2nd	4 × 400 m relay	3:20.95
