= Ronetta Smith =

Jamaican sprinter (born 1980)

Personal information
- Born: 2 May 1980 (age 46) Kingston, Jamaica

Sport
- Sport: Track and field
Medal record
Women's athletics
Representing Jamaica
Olympic Games
Bronze medal – third place	2004 Athens	4x400 m relay
World Championships
Silver medal – second place	2005 Helsinki	4x400 m relay
Bronze medal – third place	2003 Paris	4x400 m relay
CAC Junior Championships (U17)
Gold medal – first place	1996 San Salvador	4x400 m relay
Silver medal – second place	1996 San Salvador	400 m
CARIFTA Games Junior (U20)
Bronze medal – third place	1997 Bridgetown	400m

Ronetta Jamilah Smith (born 2 May 1980) is a Jamaican sprinter.

== Career ==
Smith competed for the LSU Lady Tigers track and field team in the NCAA.

A 400m runner with a personal best of 51.23 (set in May 2005), Smith has never reached an international final in an individual race. However, she was a part of the Jamaican 4 x 400 meters relay teams that won the bronze medal at the 2003 World Championships and the silver medal at the 2005 World Championships. She ran for the relay team at the 2004 Summer Olympics, but only in the qualifying heat. Before the final heat she was replaced by Novlene Williams, with whom Jamaica eventually won the bronze medal.

== Achievements ==
Year	Competition	Venue	Position	Event	Notes
Representing Jamaica
1996	Central American and Caribbean Junior Championships (U-17)	San Salvador, El Salvador	2nd	400 m	56.13
1996	Central American and Caribbean Junior Championships (U-17)	San Salvador, El Salvador	1st	4 × 400 m relay	3:45.51
1996	World Junior Championships	Sydney, Australia	7th (h)	4 × 400 m relay	3:40.58
1997	CARIFTA Games (U-20)	Bridgetown, Barbados	3rd	400 m	55.78
1997	CARIFTA Games (U-20)	Bridgetown, Barbados	4th	400 m hurdles	64.72
2002	Commonwealth Games	Manchester, England	– (qf)	400 metres	DQ
2002	Commonwealth Games	Manchester, England	2nd (h)	4 x 400 metres relay	3:31.99
2003	World Indoor Championships	Birmingham, United Kingdom	19th (h)	400 metres	53.66
2003	World Indoor Championships	Birmingham, United Kingdom	2nd	4 x 400 metres relay	3:31.23
2003	World Championships	Paris, France	6th (sf)	400 metres	51.39
2003	World Championships	Paris, France	3rd	4 x 400 metres relay	3:22.92
2004	World Indoor Championships	Budapest, Hungary	13th (h)	400 metres	53.39
2004	World Indoor Championships	Budapest, Hungary	5th	4 x 400 metres relay	3:33.77
2004	Olympic Games	Athens, Greece	2nd	4 x 400 metres relay	3:24.92 (h) SB
2005	World Championships	Helsinki, Finland	5th (h)	400 metres	52.26
2005	World Championships	Helsinki, Finland	2nd	4 x 400 metres relay	3:23.29 SB
2006	World Indoor Championships	Moscow, Russia	15th (h)	400 metres	53.57
2006	World Indoor Championships	Moscow, Russia	5th (h)	4 x 400 metres relay	3:30.03
2006	Commonwealth Games	Melbourne, Australia	16th (sf)	400 metres	53.11
2006	Commonwealth Games	Melbourne, Australia	4th	4 x 400 metres relay	3:34.91
2007	NACAC Championships	San Salvador, El Salvador	2nd	4 x 400 metres relay	3:30.16
2007	Pan American Games	Rio de Janeiro, Brazil	4th	4 x 400 metres relay	3:28.74
