= Mary Wineberg =

American track and field athlete

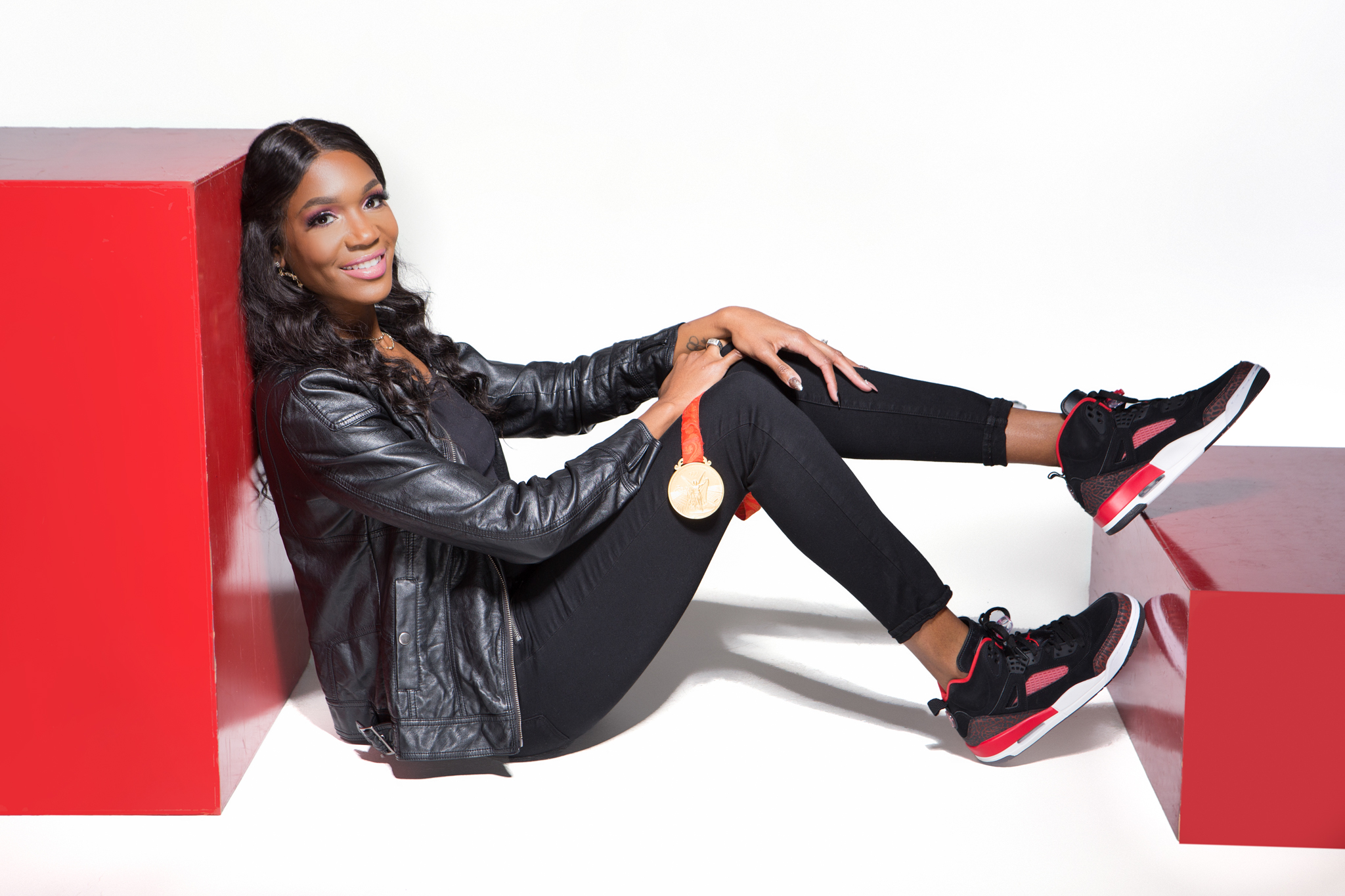
- Wineberg in 2008

Personal information
- Born: January 3, 1980 (age 46) Brooklyn, New York, U.S.
Medal record
Women's athletics
Representing the United States
Olympic Games
| Gold medal – first place | 2008 Beijing | 4 × 400 metre relay |

Mary Wineberg (née Danner, born January 3, 1980) is an American track and field athlete from Cincinnati, Ohio. She was born in Brooklyn, New York. After graduating from Walnut Hills High School, she attended the University of Cincinnati on a track scholarship, graduating in 2002 with a bachelor's degree in education.

Wineberg was an Olympic competitor in athletics at the 2008 Summer Olympics in Beijing. She competed in the 400 m race and finished fifth in her semifinal, which did not qualify her for the final. However, Wineberg ran the first leg for the U.S. Women's 4 × 400 metres relay team that won the gold medal at the Games. Wineberg also has a gold medal from the 2007 Outdoor World Championships in the 4 × 400 relay. She finished top 8 in the world that year at the world championships in the 400 meters. Wineberg has one silver medal from the 2006 Indoor Worlds and a bronze from the 2003 Indoor World Championships. She was able to represent Team USA on various relays such as Penn Relays, World Cup, Texas Relays and the Mt. Sac Relays. Wineberg was the University of Cincinnati's first female African American athlete to win gold at an Olympic Games.

Wineberg was sponsored by Nike and later the New York Athletic Club/Brooks. She was coached by Jim Schnur, and her husband Chris Wineberg served as her training partner. She retired from the sport in 2013, after losing her mother in 2012.

Wineberg now lives in Cincinnati, Ohio, USA, and works as an educator. She has been inducted into the University of Cincinnati Hall of Fame, the Cincinnati Public Schools Hall of Fame, has a day named after her in Cincinnati (September 21 is Mary Wineberg Day), and has received numerous awards and accolades for her performance in the Olympics and also from mentoring youth in the community. She has written two books- "Unwavering Perseverance: An Olympic Gold Medalist Finds Peace", and a children's book "I Didn't Win". Wineberg is married and has two daughters.
