= Lwiza John =

Tanzanian runner

Lwiza Msyani John (born December 19, 1980, in Dar-es-Salaam) is a Tanzanian athlete who mainly competes in the 800 metres. Her personal best is 1:59.58 minutes, achieved in 2000.

== Achievements ==
- 2003 Afro-Asian Games - gold medal
- 2003 All-Africa Games - bronze medal
- 2003 East African Championships - gold medal
- 2001 East African Championships - gold medal
- 2001 East African Championships - gold medal (200 metres)
- 2001 IAAF World Indoor Championships - fourth place
