= Stade Germain Comarmond =

Stadium in Mauritius

Germain Comarmond Stadium
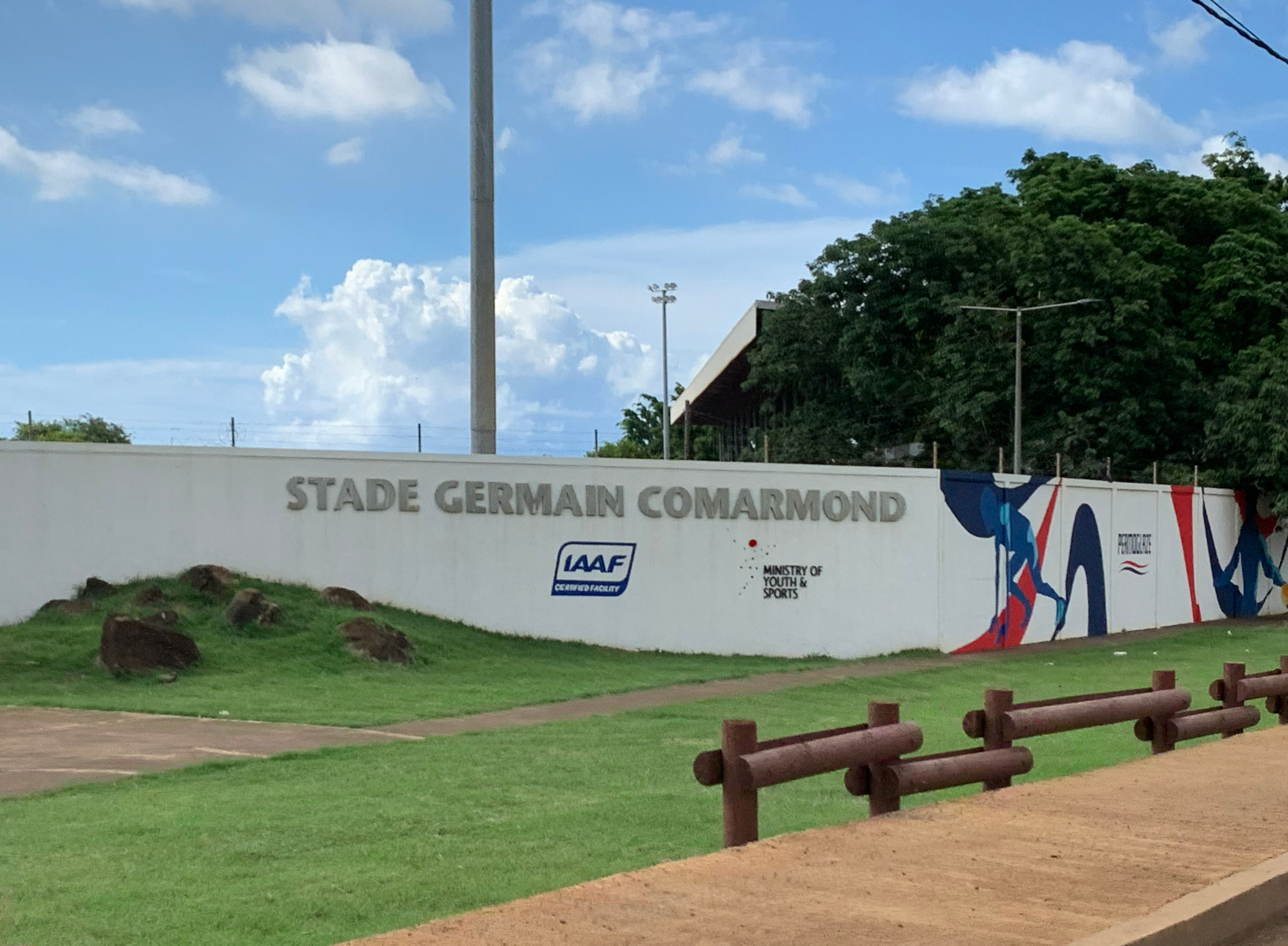
- Interactive map of Germain Comarmond Stadium
- Location: Bambous, Mauritius
- Coordinates: 20°14′45″S 57°25′16″E
- Capacity: 5,000
- Surface: Grass

Construction
- Groundbreaking: 2001
- Opened: 21 August 2003

Tenants
- Mauritius U-17; Mauritius U-20; Petite Rivière Noire SC; Bambous Etoile de L'Ouest SC

The Germain Comarmond Stadium is a multi-use stadium in Bambous, Rivière Noire District, Mauritius. It is currently used mostly for staging football matches and athletics events. The stadium was built in 2001 and opened in August 2003. The venue hosted the 2006 African Championships in Athletics. It is currently the home stadium of the Mauritius national under-17 football team, Mauritius national under-20 football team, Petite Rivière Noire SC and Bambous Etoile de L'Ouest Sports Club.
