= Rosemary Hayward =

Australian sprinter (born 1980)

Personal information
- Born: 10 November 1980 (age 45) Central Coast, Australia

Sport
- Country: Australia
- Sport: Track and field
- Event: 400 metres
Medal record
Track and field
Representing Australia
Commonwealth Games
Gold medal – first place	2006 Melbourne	4x400m relay
World U20 Championships
Bronze medal – third place	1996 Sydney	400m
Bronze medal – third place	1996 Sydney	4x400m relay

Rosemary Fisher (née Hayward; born 10 November 1980) is a retired Australian sprinter who competed in international elite events. She was a 2006 Commonwealth Games champion and a double World Junior bronze medalist in 400m events.
