= Sandrine Thiébaud-Kangni =

French-Togolese sprinter (born 1976)

Personal information
- Full name: Sandrine Carmen Genevieve Thiébaud-Kangni
- Nationality: French-Togolese
- Born: 21 April 1976 (age 50) Sucy-en-Brie, France
- Height: 1.76 m (5 ft 9 1/2 in)
- Weight: 65 kg (143 lb)

Sport
- Sport: Athletics
- Events: Sprint, heptathlon
- Club: USC -Montreuil Athletisme (FRA)
- Team: FRANCE 1992; TOGO 2001
- Coached by: PIA-RACINGTEAM
- Retired: 2013

Achievements and titles
- World finals: 11 World Championships
- National finals: 43 French Titles in Athletics
- Highest world ranking: 23
- Personal bests: 400 m: 52.50 s (2003); Heptathlon: 5,079 points (2010)

Sandrine Carmen Genevieve Thiébaud-Kangni (born 21 April 1976 in Sucy-en-Brie, France) is a French-Togolese Athlete 1990 tp 2000. 400 metres French Junior Record older since 1995. 53sec73 .4×400 meters 3.32.79 transfere allégeance 2001 to Togolese sprinter and heptathlete. She is a two-time Olympian and a multiple-time national record holder for the 400m and heptathlon. She is also the daughter of middle-distance runner Roger Kangni, who competed in the 800 metres at the 1972 Summer Olympics in Munich.

== Athletic career ==
Former French athlete. Coach Jacques Piasenta et Georges Wieczorek.

French Team capitaine -Youth, Junior - Under23 from 1992 to 1999.

- French Champion Youth (combiné Récents, 300 m, long jump, 4×100 mètres. 1993

- French Champion Junior 1994 Junior World Championships SemiFinal Lisbon 1994

French Champion Junior 400 m, 4 x400

- 4ieme 400 m European championships 1995

- Européan Champion 4x400 mètres (1995) - French junior indoor champion 400 m - French Junior Outdoor champion 400 m

- Capitain

Club Athlétique de Montreuil, ST DENIS Émotion

Team member Us Creteil Cus Bologna Stade Français Martigues Athle Sud 77

First appearance French Senior Team : - World Indoor Championships Bercy 1997 4 × 400 m

- Européan club champion 1997 Athens

Kangni holds also Togolese citizenship, and chose to represent her father's birthplace in 2001 Togo at 6 Africans Championships. 3 all Africans Games and 9 world championships (TOGO Team), including the Olympic games. She first competed at the 2002 African Athletics Championships in Radès, Tunisia, where she attained a semi-final finish in the women's 400 metres. The following year, Kangni reached her breakthrough season by breaking both a national record and a personal best of 52.50 seconds at the 2003 IAAF World Championships in Saint-Denis, France.

Kangni followed her father's footsteps by competing for the women's 400 metres at the 2004 Summer Olympics in Athens. She finished sixth in the fifth heat of the event by two hundredths of a second (0.02) behind Jamaica's Allison Beckford, with a time of 52.85 seconds.

At the 2008 Summer Olympics in Beijing, Kangni competed again for the second time in the 400 metres. She ran in the seventh and final heat against six other athletes, including Jamaica's Shericka Williams, who eventually won the silver medal in the final. She finished the race in seventh place by five seconds ahead of Swaziland's Temalangeni Dlamini, outside her personal best of 54.16. Kangni, however, failed to advance into the semi-finals, as she placed forty-fifth overall, and was ranked farther below three mandatory slots for the next round. Following her elimination from the heats, Kangni announced that the Olympic games in Beijing was a "great feast for the sport", and also, represented the culmination of her career.

Despite her sudden retirement from the Olympics, Kangni continued to build her success in the track and field by participating in numerous sporting events. In 2010, she opted to focus on and compete for the heptathlon at the Meeting International de Maurice in Réduit, Mauritius, where she set a personal best and a national record-breaking score of 5,079 points.

At the 2011 IAAF World Championships in Daegu, South Korea, Kangni made her comeback to the international scene as a sprinter for the 400 metres. She finished last in the first heat and thirty-fifth overall, with her slowest time of 59.68 seconds.

== See also ==
- List of eligibility transfers in athletics
