= 2006 African Championships in Athletics =

2006 African Championships
- Championships logo
- Dates: 9–13 August
- Host city: Bambous, Mauritius
- Venue: Stade Germain Comarmond
- Events: 44
- Participation: about 438 athletes from 42 nations

The 15th African Championships in Athletics were held in Mauritius between August 9 and August 13, 2006. The event was staged at Stade Germain Comarmond in Bambous, Rivière Noire District. This was the second time when the African Championships in Athletics were hosted in Mauritius, the first was in 1992.

Many world-class runners were competing, but in terms of the field events the standard was poor. In addition, some of those, especially the throwing events, had very few participants as African federations cannot afford to send large teams.

== Men's results ==
=== Track ===
Event	Gold		Silver		Bronze	
100 m	Olusoji Fasuba; Nigeria	10.37	Uchenna Emedolu; Nigeria	10.44	Eric Nkansah; Ghana	10.65
100 m	August 10:					
200 m	Uchenna Emedolu; Nigeria	20.61	Stéphan Buckland; Mauritius	20.67	Leigh Julius; South Africa	20.82
200 m	August 13:					
400 m	Gary Kikaya; DR Congo	45.03	Paul Gorries; South Africa	45.50	Young Talkmore Nyongani; Zimbabwe	45.60
400 m	August 11:					
800 m	Alex Kipchirchir; Kenya	1:46.62	Ismail Ahmed Ismail; Sudan	1:46.65	Alfred Kirwa; Kenya	1:46.85
800 m	August 11:					
1500 m	Alex Kipchirchir; Kenya	3:46.54	Adil Kaouch; Morocco	3:46.72	Tarek Boukensa; Algeria	3:46.81
1500 m	August 13:					
5000 m	Kenenisa Bekele; Ethiopia	14:03.41	Mike Kigen; Kenya	14:05.12	Moses Kipsiro; Uganda	14:05.20
5000 m	August 9:					
10,000 m	Moses Kipsiro; Uganda	28:03.46	Mike Kigen; Kenya	28:03.70	Abebe Dinkesa; Ethiopia	28:05.07
10,000 m	August 13:					
110 m hurdles	Aymen Ben Ahmed; Tunisia	13.77	Joseph-Berlioz Randriamihaja; Madagascar	14.03	Ruan de Vries; South Africa	14.05
110 m hurdles	August 12:					
400 m hurdles	Louis van Zyl; South Africa	49.43	Alwyn Myburgh; South Africa	49.88	Kurt Couto; Mozambique	50.72
400 m hurdles	August 10:					
3000 m s'chase	Paul Kipsiele Koech; Kenya	8:11.03 (CR)	Abdelkader Hachlaf; Morocco	8:33.52	Ruben Ramolefi; South Africa	8:39.67
3000 m s'chase	August 11: reigning Olympic champion Ezekiel Kemboi finished second but was disqualified.					
20 km walk	David Kimutai; Kenya	1:23:58	Hatem Ghoula; Tunisia	1:25:02	Hicham Mejbar; Algeria	1:25:15
20 km walk	August 13:					
4 × 100 m relay	Nigeria; Peter Emelieze^{[a]} Uchenna Emedolu; Adetoyi Durotoye; Olusoji Fasuba	39.63	South Africa; Hannes Dreyer; Leigh Julius; Lee-Roy Newton; Sherwin Vries	39.68	Ghana; Harry Adu Mfum; Cyril Ferguson; Seth Amoo; Eric Nkansah	40.12
4 × 100 m relay	August 11:					
4 × 400 m relay	Kenya; George Kwoba; Vincent Mumo Kiilu; Sammy Rono; Thomas Musembi	3:06.78	South Africa; Alwyn Myburgh; Ofentse Mogawane; Ruben Majola; Paul Gorries	3:07.65	Botswana; Oganeditse Moseki; California Molefe; Gakologelwang Masheto; Obakeng Ngwigwa	3:08.13
4 × 400 m relay	August 13:					
WR world record | AR area record | CR championship record | GR games record | NR national record | OR Olympic record | PB personal best | SB season best | WL world leading (in a given season)

- ^{a} Many sources (including the IAAF) list the lead off runner as Grace Ebor, a female Nigerian middle-distance runner. This is incorrect as the lead off runner was actually Peter Emelieze.

=== Field ===
Event	Gold		Silver		Bronze	
High jump	Kabelo Kgosiemang; Botswana	2.30	Sere Boubakar; Burkina Faso	2.22	Ramsey Carelse; South Africa	2.22
High jump	August 13:					
Pole vault	Okkert Brits; South Africa	5.20	Abderrahmane Tamada; Tunisia	5.15	Hamdi Dhouibi; Tunisia	4.80
Pole vault	August 12:					
Long jump	Ignisious Gaisah; Ghana	8.51 (+3.7)	Khotso Mokoena; South Africa	8.45 (+4.2)	Issam Nima; Algeria	8.37
Long jump	August 9:					
Triple jump	Tarik Bouguetaïb; Morocco	17.25 (+4.2)	Khotso Mokoena; South Africa	16.67 (+3.6)	Younès Moudrik; Morocco	16.58 (+3.7)
Triple jump	August 12:					
Shot put	Yasser Ibrahim Farag; Egypt	18.93	Janus Robberts; South Africa	17.88	Mohammed Medded; Tunisia	17.87
Shot put	August 9:					
Discus throw	Omar Ahmed ElGazaly; Egypt	61.11	Yasser Ibrahim Farag; Egypt	54.38	Chima Ugwu; Nigeria	51.56
Discus throw	August 10: Nabil Kirame of Morocco, who originally won the bronze, was later disqualified for doping.					
Hammer throw	Chris Harmse; South Africa	77.55 CR	Saber Souid; Tunisia	72.66	Mohsen El Anany; Egypt	69.22
Hammer throw	August 12:					
Javelin throw	Gerhardus Pienaar; South Africa	77.55	Gerbrandt Grobler; South Africa	75.95	Walid Adb El Wahab; Egypt	69.86
Javelin throw	August 13:					
Decathlon	Hamdi Dhouibi; Tunisia	7,566 points	Mourad Souissi; Algeria	7,113 points	Terence Wepener; South Africa	7,084 points
WR world record | AR area record | CR championship record | GR games record | NR national record | OR Olympic record | PB personal best | SB season best | WL world leading (in a given season)

== Women's results ==
=== Track ===
Event	Gold		Silver		Bronze	
100 m	Vida Anim; Ghana	11.58	Geraldine Pillay; South Africa	11.67	Endurance Ojokolo; Nigeria	11.95
100 m	August 10:					
200 m	Vida Anim; Ghana	22.90	Geraldine Pillay; South Africa	23.11	Fabienne Feraez; Benin	23.15
200 m	August 13:					
400 m	Amy Mbacké Thiam; Senegal	52.22	Amantle Montsho; Botswana	52.68	Louise Ayetotche; Ivory Coast	52.92
400 m	August 11:					
800 m	Janeth Jepkosgei; Kenya	2 :00.64	Maria de Lurdes Mutola; Mozambique	2 :01.08	Nouria Merah Benida; Algeria	2 :02.18
800 m	August 13:					
1500 m	Nouria Merah Benida; Algeria	4:23.26	Safa Issaoui; Tunisia	4:24.08	Berhane Herpassa; Ethiopia	4:24.09
1500 m	August 11:					
5000 m	Meseret Defar; Ethiopia	15:56.00	Tirunesh Dibaba; Ethiopia	15:56.04	Sylvia Chibiwott Kibet; Kenya	15:57.14
5000 m	August 10:					
10,000 m	Edith Masai; Kenya	31:27.96 CR	Isabella Ochichi; Kenya	31:29.43	Emily Chebet; Kenya	31:33.39
10,000 m	August 12:					
100 m hurdles	Toyin Augustus; Nigeria	13.44	Carole Me-ban Kaboud; Cameroon	13.85	Gnima Faye; Senegal	13.95
100 m hurdles	August 10:					
400 m hurdles	Janet Wienand; South Africa	56.97	Houria Moussa; Algeria	57.15	Aissafa Soulama; Burkina Faso	57.27
400 m hurdles	August 13:					
3000 m s'chase	Jeruto Kiptum; Kenya	10:00.02	Habiba Ghribi; Tunisia	10:10.93	Chaabi Bouchra; Morocco	10:11.52
3000 m s'chase	August 11:					
20 km walk	Nagwa Ibrahim Saleh; Egypt	1:43:22	Arasa Asnaksh Abissa; Ethiopia	1:45:31	Ghania Amzal; Algeria	1:46:05
20 km walk	August 13:					
4 × 100 m relay	Ghana; Gifty Addy, Elizabeth Amolofo, Vida Anim, Esther Dankwah	44.43	Nigeria; Toyin Augustus; Francisca Idoko; Gloria Kemasuode; Endurance Ojokolo	44.52	Cameroon; Esther Solange Ndoumbe; Carole Kaboud Me-Bam; Josephine Mbarga Bikie; Leonie Myriam Mani	46.43
4 × 100 m relay	August 11:					
4 × 400 m relay	South Africa; Amanda Kotze, Estie Wittstock, Janet Wienand, Heide Seyerling	3:36.88	Nigeria; Alice Nwosu; Mary Onyemuwa; Kate Obilor; Christiana Ekpukhon	3:37.00	Kenya; Josephine Nyarunda; Elizabeth Muthuka; Annet Mwanzi Lukhuyi; Florence Wasike	3:39.79
4 × 400 m relay	August 13:					
WR world record | AR area record | CR championship record | GR games record | NR national record | OR Olympic record | PB personal best | SB season best | WL world leading (in a given season)

=== Field ===
Event	Gold		Silver		Bronze	
High jump	Rene van der Merwe; South Africa	1.84	Nneka Ukuh; Nigeria	1.80	Sara Bouaoudia; Algeria	1.75
High jump	August 11:					
Pole vault	Syrine Balti; Tunisia	4.21	Nisrine Dinar; Morocco	3.60	Lindi Roux; South Africa	3.60
Pole vault	August 10:					
Long jump	Joséphine Mbarga-Bikié; Cameroon	6.33 (+2.9)	Kéné Ndoye; Senegal	6.30 (+1.8)	Chinazom Amadi; Nigeria	6.23 (+3.0)
Long jump	August 10:					
Triple jump	Yamilé Aldama; Sudan	14.71 (+2.6)	Kéné Ndoye; Senegal	14.08 (+3.6)	Otonye Iworima; Nigeria	13.88 (+2.1)
Triple jump	August 13:					
Shot put	Vivian Chukwuemeka; Nigeria	17.45	Wafa Ismail El Baghdadi; Egypt	15.48	Monique Ngo Ngoué-Poree; Cameroon	14.99
Shot put	August 13:					
Discus throw	Elizna Naude; South Africa	55.42	Vivian Chukwuemeka; Nigeria	49.63	Suzanne Kragbe; Ivory Coast	49.05
Discus throw	August 11:					
Hammer throw	Marwa Hussein Arafat; Egypt	62.16	Blessing Egwu; Nigeria	51.77	Menakshee Totah; Mauritius	36.68
Hammer throw	August 9: Egypt's Marwa Ahmed Arafat retained her African title, while Hayat El Ghazi of Morocco, who originally won the silver, was later disqualified for doping.					
Javelin throw	Justine Robbeson; South Africa	60.60 PB/AR	Sunette Viljoen; South Africa	55.64	Lindy Leveau; Seychelles	54.41
Javelin throw	August 12:					
Heptathlon	Janice Josephs; South Africa	5876 points	Celine Laporte; Seychelles	4932 points	Nadege Foe Essama; Cameroon	3808 points
Heptathlon	August 11–12:					
WR world record | AR area record | CR championship record | GR games record | NR national record | OR Olympic record | PB personal best | SB season best | WL world leading (in a given season)

== Medals table ==
Rank	Nation	Gold	Silver	Bronze	Total
1	South Africa (RSA)	10	11	6	27
2	Kenya (KEN)	8	3	4	15
3	Nigeria (NGR)	5	6	4	15
4	Egypt (EGY)	4	2	2	8
5	Ghana (GHA)	4	0	2	6
6	Tunisia (TUN)	3	5	2	10
7	Ethiopia (ETH)	2	2	2	6
8	Morocco (MAR)	1	3	2	6
9	Algeria (ALG)	1	2	6	9
10	Senegal (SEN)	1	2	1	4
11	Cameroon (CMR)	1	1	3	5
12	Botswana (BOT)	1	1	1	3
13	Sudan (SUD)	1	1	0	2
14	Uganda (UGA)	1	0	1	2
15	DR Congo (COD)	1	0	0	1
16	Burkina Faso (BFA)	0	1	1	2
16	Mauritius (MUS)	0	1	1	2
16	Mozambique (MOZ)	0	1	1	2
16	Seychelles (SEY)	0	1	1	2
20	Madagascar (MAD)	0	1	0	1
21	Ivory Coast (CIV)	0	0	2	2
22	Benin (BEN)	0	0	1	1
22	Zimbabwe (ZIM)	0	0	1	1
Totals (23 entries)		44	44	44	132

== Participating nations ==
- Algeria (20)
- Benin (8)
- Botswana (13)
- Burkina Faso (7)
- Burundi (4)
- Cameroon (11)
- Cape Verde (1)
- Central African Republic (3)
- Chad (1)
- Comoros (1)
- Ivory Coast (7)
- Democratic Republic of the Congo (3)
- Egypt (14)
- Eritrea (4)
- Ethiopia (23)
- Gabon (2)
- Ghana (20)
- Kenya (36)
- Lesotho (2)
- Liberia (10)
- Madagascar (6)
- Malawi (1)
- Mali (8)
- Mauritius (33)
- Morocco (25)
- Mozambique (6)
- Namibia (6)
- Nigeria (32)
- Republic of the Congo (4)
- Rwanda (5)
- Senegal (20)
- Seychelles (14)
- Somalia (1)
- Swaziland (2)
- South Africa (53)
- Sudan (2)
- Tanzania (4)
- Togo (2)
- Tunisia (12)
- Uganda (4)
- Zambia (4)
- Zimbabwe (4)

== See also ==
- 2006 in athletics (track and field)
