= Shericka Williams =

Jamaican sprinter

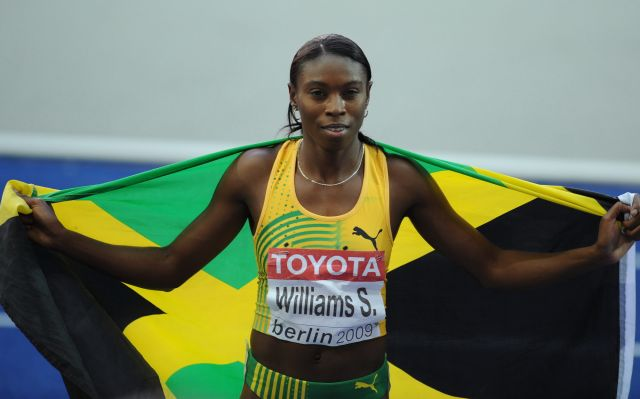
- Williams at the 2009 World Championships

Personal information
- Born: 17 September 1985 (age 41)
- Weight: 54 kg (119 lb)

Sport
- Country: Jamaica
- Sport: Athletics
- Event: 4 × 400m Relay
Medal record
Olympic Games
Silver medal – second place	2008 Beijing	400 m
Silver medal – second place	2008 Beijing	4 × 400 m relay
Silver medal – second place	2012 London	4 × 400 m relay
World Championships
Silver medal – second place	2005 Helsinki	4 × 400 m relay
Silver medal – second place	2007 Osaka	4 × 400 m relay
Silver medal – second place	2009 Berlin	400 m
Silver medal – second place	2009 Berlin	4 × 400 m relay
Silver medal – second place	2011 Daegu	4 × 400 m relay
Commonwealth Games
Gold medal – first place	2014 Glasgow	4 × 400 m relay

Shericka Williams (born 17 September 1985 in Black River, St. Elizabeth) is a Jamaican former sprinter. Together with Novlene Williams-Mills, Ronetta Smith and Lorraine Fenton she won a silver medal in 4 × 400 metres relay at the 2005 World Championships in Athletics. She also competed in the individual contest, but was knocked out in the semifinal. Two years later, she won another silver medal in the 4 × 400 metres relay event at the 2007 World Championships in Athletics, this time with Shereefa Lloyd, Davita Prendergast and Novlene Williams-Mills. The team set a national record in that race, finishing second to the United States in a time of 3:19.73.

At the 2008 Summer Olympics in Beijing, China, Williams won the silver medal in the 400 metres in a personal-best time of 49.39 seconds. She also won bronze in the 4 × 400 m relay with Shereefa Lloyd, Rosemarie Whyte and Novlene Williams-Mills.

At the 2012 Summer Olympics, she only competed in the 4 × 400 m relay, winning a silver medal with the Jamaican team of Christine Day, Rosemarie Whyte and Novlene Williams-Mills. She was also part of the Jamaican 4 × 400 m team that won gold at the 2014 Commonwealth Games with a Commonwealth Games record.

== Personal bests ==
- 200 metres – 22.50 (2008)
- 400 metres – 49.32 (2009)
