= Elizabeth Muthuka =

Kenyan sprinter

Medal record

Women's athletics

Representing Kenya

African Championships
Bronze medal – third place	2006 Bambous	4×400 m

Elizabeth Muthuka (born 1975) is former runner form Kenya who concentrated on 400 metres. Her surname is sometimes spelled Muthoka.

Muthuka won 100, 200 and 400 metres races at the 2005 Kenyan Athletics Championships and has won number of national championships since then. She competed at the 2006 African Championships in Athletics 400 metres race. She reached the semifinals at the 2007 All-Africa Games. At the 2008 African Championships she finished 7th in 400 metres final and helped the Kenyan 4*400 metres relay team to reach the final. However, she did not take part in the final, where Kenya finished second.

She broke the 400 metres Kenyan record at the Kenyan Championships in July 2008 by running 51.53. The previous record, 51.56 by Ruth Waithera was set in 1984. A week later she lowered the record to 50.82 at the Kenyan Olympic trials. She was selected to compete for Kenya at the 2008 Summer Olympics. She had, however, failed a doping test at the Kenyan athletics championships and thus did not compete at the Olympics. She tested positive for Nandrolone and was given a two-year ban by Athletics Kenya. In addition, her 400 metres Kenyan records were erased.

She had returned to competition in early 2011.
