= Novlene Williams-Mills =

Jamaican sprinter (born 1982)

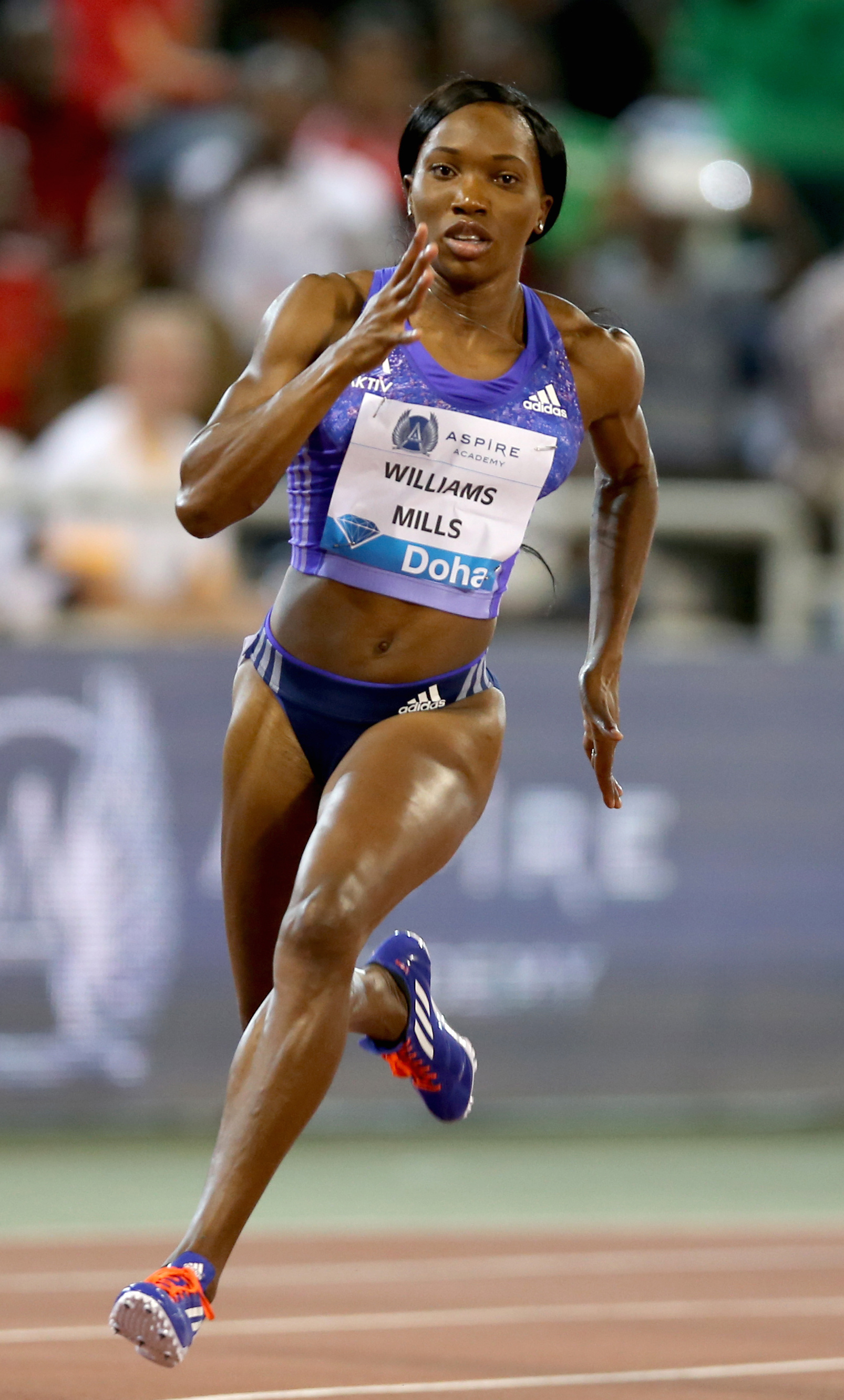
- Williams-Mills in 2015

Personal information
- Born: 26 April 1982 (age 44) Saint Ann Parish, Jamaica
- Height: 5 ft 6 in (168 cm)
- Weight: 121 lb (55 kg)
- Spouse: Jameel Mills (married 2006)

Sport
- Country: Jamaica
- Sport: Track and field
- Event: 400 metres
- College team: University of Florida
- Club: Adidas, Herzogenaurach (GER)
Medal record
Olympic Games
Silver medal – second place	2008 Beijing	4 × 400 m relay
Silver medal – second place	2012 London	4 × 400 m relay
Silver medal – second place	2016 Rio de Janeiro	4 × 400 m relay
Bronze medal – third place	2004 Athens	4 × 400 m relay
World Championships
Gold medal – first place	2015 Beijing	4 × 400 m relay
Silver medal – second place	2005 Helsinki	4 × 400 m relay
Silver medal – second place	2007 Osaka	4 × 400 m relay
Silver medal – second place	2009 Berlin	4 × 400 m relay
Silver medal – second place	2011 Daegu	4 × 400 m relay
Bronze medal – third place	2007 Osaka	400 m
World Relays
Silver medal – second place	2014 Nassau	4 × 400 m relay
Silver medal – second place	2015 Nassau	4 × 400 m relay
Commonwealth Games
Gold medal – first place	2014 Glasgow	4 × 400 m relay
Silver medal – second place	2014 Glasgow	400 m
Bronze medal – third place	2006 Melbourne	400 m
Diamond League
First place	2014	400 m
Representing Americas
Continental Cup
Gold medal – first place	2014 Marrakech	4 × 400 m relay
Silver medal – second place	2014 Marrakech	400 m

Novlene Hilaire Williams-Mills (née, Williams; born 26 April 1982) is a retired Jamaican track and field athlete. She won the bronze medal in the 400 metres at the 2007 World Championships. She is also a three-time Olympic silver medallist in the 4 × 400 metres relay. In 2015 she won relay gold alongside her Jamaican teammates.

== Early life ==
Williams-Mills was born in Saint Ann, Jamaica. She is a graduate of Ferncourt High School, located in Claremont, St. Ann Parish, Jamaica. She attended the University of Florida in Gainesville, Florida, where she was a member of coach Tom Jones' Florida Gators track and field team. She graduated from the university with a bachelor's degree in 2004.

In March 2020, Williams-Mills announced that she was pregnant with Twins.

== Athletics career ==
At the 2005 World Championships in Athletics, she won (together with Shericka Williams, Ronetta Smith and Lorraine Fenton) a silver medal. At the 2006 Commonwealth Games in Melbourne, Australia, she received a bronze medal for her third-place finish in the 400 metres.

At the 2012 Olympic games, Williams-Mills won a silver medal in the 4 × 400 meter relay. She also placed 5th in the individual 400 m event.

Williams-Mills missed most of the 2013 season due to undergoing treatment for breast cancer.

During the 2014 season, Williams-Mills was very successful. Early in the season, she and three other Jamaican women won a silver medal in the 4 × 400 m relay at the 2014 world relays. Williams-Mills competed at the 2014 Commonwealth Games in Glasgow and won a silver medal in the individual 400 m and a gold in the 4 × 400 m relay, setting a games record in the latter. She was also successful at Diamond League meets, where she was crowned the 2014 Diamond League champion in the 400 m.

In 2015, Williams-Mills again won a silver medal at the world relays as part of the Jamaican 4 × 400 m team. At the 2015 World Championships in Athletics in Beijing, Williams-Mills finished sixth in the 400 m final involving four Jamaican women. In the relay, along with Christine Day, Shericka Jackson and Stephenie Ann McPherson, the individual 4th, 3rd and 5th placers, respectively, the Jamaican team won gold in front of the American favorites by just outsprinting them in the last 50 metres.

In 2016, Williams-Mills only competed in the relay at the 2016 Olympic games, running as the anchor leg for Jamaica trying to pass Allyson Felix of the US, but during the final stretch Allyson manage to hold off Novelene to get gold for the US and Jamaica got silver.

In 2017, Williams-Mills won the 400 m at the Jamaica invitational, winning in a time of 50.56. Later on in the season, she also won the 400 m at the Diamond League meeting in Paris in a time of 51.03.

At the London 2017 World Championships, Williams-Mills made the final of the women's 400 m and came in eighth place in a time of 51.49. In the 4 × 400 m relay, which was going to be her last major championship race, she was scheduled to anchor the Jamaican team; however, on the second leg, Anneisha McLaughlin-Wilby pulled up injured, therefore ending the Jamaican team's chances of medalling in that event.

During the 2017 season, Williams-Mills announced that she would retire at the end of the 2017 season “ This is my farewell season; I’ve been in this for a long time and I think I’ve done my fair share and represented my country well so sometimes you have to hang up your spikes and move on the next chapter of your life and I think I’ve reached that point where I need to do that now", said Williams-Mills.

Her last race was on 1 September 2017 at the Brussels Diamond League, where she came 6th place running 51.27.

== Cancer diagnosis ==
In July 2013, Williams-Mills told members of the media that she was diagnosed with breast cancer before the 2012 Olympics. Very few people at the time knew about the diagnosis. Despite the diagnosis, she still ran the race and was able to help Jamaica win a bronze medal. After the Olympics, Williams-Mills had a mastectomy and in January 2013, had another operation. She has stated that she would run, "for all the breast cancer survivors out there."

== See also ==
- Florida Gators
- List of Olympic medalists in athletics (women)
- List of University of Florida alumni
- List of University of Florida Olympians
