= Christine Amertil =

Bahamian sprinter (born 1979)

Personal information
- Born: 18 August 1979 (age 46) Nassau, New Providence, Bahamas
- Height: 168 cm (5 ft 6 in)
- Weight: 54 kg (119 lb)
Medal record
Women's athletics
Representing Bahamas
World Championships
Silver medal – second place	2009 Berlin	4 x 100 m relay
World Indoor Championships
Silver medal – second place	2003 Birmingham	400 m
Bronze medal – third place	2006 Moscow	400 m
Commonwealth Games
Bronze medal – third place	2010 Delhi	400 m
Pan American Games
Silver medal – second place	2007 Rio de Janeiro	400 m
Continental Cup
Gold medal – first place	2002 Madrid	4x400 m relay
Gold medal – first place	2006 Athens	4x400 m relay
Gold medal – first place	2010 Split	4×400 relay
Central American and Caribbean Championships in Athletics
Gold medal – first place	2003 Grenada	4 x 100 m relay
Silver medal – second place	2005 Nassau	200 m
Silver medal – second place	2005 Nassau	4 x 100 m relay
Silver medal – second place	2005 Nassau	4 x 400 m relay
Bronze medal – third place	2008 Cali	4 x 400 m relay
Central American and Caribbean Games
Gold medal – first place	2010 Mayaguez	400 m
NACAC Championships
Bronze medal – third place	2015 Costa Rica	4x400m relay

Christine Amertil (born 18 August 1979 in Nassau, New Providence) is a Bahamian athlete competing mainly in the 400 metres. She graduated from Southeastern Louisiana University.

== Achievements ==
- 2006 IAAF World Indoor Championships – bronze medal
- 3rd World Athletics Final – fifth place
- 2004 Olympic Games – seventh place
- 2nd World Athletics Final – fourth place
- 2003 World Indoor Championships in Athletics – silver medal
