= Christy Ekpukhon =

Nigerian sprinter (born 1985)

Medal record

Women's athletics

Representing Nigeria

African Championships
Silver medal – second place	2006 Bambous	4×400 m

Christy Ekpukhon Ihunaegbo (born 6 February 1985 in Asaba) is a Nigerian sprinter who specializes in the 400 metres.

Her personal best time is 51.11 seconds, achieved in May 2007 in Brazzaville.

In 2008, she was found guilty of metenolone doping. The sample was delivered on 17 February 2008 in an in-competition test in Leipzig. Ekpukhon received a suspension from March 2008 to March 2010.

== Achievements ==
Year	Tournament	Venue	Result	Extra
2006	Commonwealth Games	Melbourne, Australia	2nd	4 × 400 m relay
2006	African Championships	Bambous, Mauritius	5th	400 m
2006	World Cup	Athens, Greece	6th	4 × 400 m relay
2007	All-Africa Games	Algiers, Algeria	5th	400 m
2007	All-Africa Games	Algiers, Algeria	1st	4 × 400 m relay
