= Athletics at the 2002 Commonwealth Games – Women's 400 metres =

Women's 400 metres at the Commonwealth Games

The women's 400 metres event at the 2002 Commonwealth Games was held on 26–28 July 2002.

== Medalists ==
Gold	Silver	Bronze
Aliann Pompey; Guyana	Lee McConnell; Scotland	Sandie Richards; Jamaica

== Results ==
=== Heats ===
Qualification: First 4 of each heat (Q) and the next 4 fastest (q) qualified for the quarterfinals.

Rank	Heat	Name	Nationality	Time	Notes
1	2	Allison Beckford	Jamaica	52.29	Q
2	2	Christine Amertil	Bahamas	52.64	Q
3	2	Aliann Pompey	Guyana	52.88	Q
4	1	Ronetta Smith	Jamaica	52.92	Q
5	3	Catherine Murphy	Wales	53.09	Q
6	5	Mireille Nguimgo	Cameroon	53.14	Q
7	4	Sandie Richards	Jamaica	53.29	Q
8	5	LaDonna Antoine-Watkins	Canada	53.44	Q
9	3	Hortense Bewouda	Cameroon	53.58	Q
10	4	Helen Frost	England	53.78	Q
11	2	Damayanthi Darsha	Sri Lanka	53.99	Q
11	3	Jane Arnott	New Zealand	53.99	Q
13	2	Foy Williams	Canada	54.05	q
14	3	Melanie Purkiss	England	54.14	Q
15	4	Lami Oyewumi	Canada	54.21	Q
16	5	Heide Seyerling	South Africa	54.23	Q
17	5	Kudirat Akhigbe	Nigeria	54.33	Q
18	1	Doris Jacob	Nigeria	54.34	Q
19	1	Helen Karagounis	England	54.47	Q
20	2	Adia McKinnon	Trinidad and Tobago	54.57	q
21	4	Nickeisha Charles	Trinidad and Tobago	54.80	Q
22	4	Carey Easton	Scotland	54.97	q
23	3	Hajarat Yusuf	Nigeria	55.09	q
24	1	Lee McConnell	Scotland	55.62	Q
25	5	Theodora Kyriakou	Cyprus	56.13	
26	2	Geraldine Elysee	Mauritius	57.22	PB
27	5	Vasiti Vatureba	Fiji	57.62	
28	3	Yaznee Nasheeda	Maldives	1:04.14	
	1	Fatmata Bash-Koroma	Sierra Leone	DQ	
	1	Mereoni Raluve	Fiji	DQ	
	4	Hazel-Ann Regis	Grenada	DQ	
	4	Tina Paulino	Mozambique	DNS	

=== Quarterfinals ===
Qualification: First 4 of each heat (Q) and the next 4 fastest qualified for the semifinals.

Rank	Heat	Name	Nationality	Time	Notes
1	1	Sandie Richards	Jamaica	51.91	Q
2	3	Christine Amertil	Bahamas	52.13	Q
3	2	Allison Beckford	Jamaica	52.14	Q
4	1	Catherine Murphy	Wales	52.15	Q
4	3	Lee McConnell	Scotland	52.15	Q
6	2	Heide Seyerling	South Africa	52.36	Q
7	2	LaDonna Antoine-Watkins	Canada	52.37	Q
8	2	Hortense Bewouda	Cameroon	52.41	Q
9	2	Jane Arnott	New Zealand	52.48	q
10	1	Mireille Nguimgo	Cameroon	52.50	Q
11	3	Aliann Pompey	Guyana	52.61	Q
12	3	Helen Frost	England	52.67	Q, SB
13	1	Helen Karagounis	England	52.69	Q
14	1	Doris Jacob	Nigeria	53.03	q
15	2	Melanie Purkiss	England	53.08	q
16	1	Foy Williams	Canada	53.26	q
17	2	Hajarat Yusuf	Nigeria	53.58	
17	3	Lami Oyewumi	Canada	53.58	
19	3	Kudirat Akhigbe	Nigeria	53.64	
20	1	Adia McKinnon	Trinidad and Tobago	53.84	
21	3	Nickeisha Charles	Trinidad and Tobago	53.87	
22	1	Damayanthi Darsha	Sri Lanka	53.91	
23	2	Carey Easton	Scotland	54.10	
	3	Ronetta Smith	Jamaica	DQ	

=== Semifinals ===
Qualification: First 4 of each heat qualified directly (Q) for the final.

Rank	Heat	Name	Nationality	Time	Notes
1	2	Lee McConnell	Scotland	51.29	Q, PB
2	2	Aliann Pompey	Guyana	51.34	Q, NR
3	2	Catherine Murphy	Wales	51.36	Q, PB
4	1	Christine Amertil	Bahamas	51.38	Q
5	2	Sandie Richards	Jamaica	51.45	Q
6	2	Mireille Nguimgo	Cameroon	51.76	SB
7	2	Helen Karagounis	England	51.97	PB
8	1	Hortense Bewouda	Cameroon	52.00	Q
9	1	Allison Beckford	Jamaica	52.10	Q
10	1	Heide Seyerling	South Africa	52.12	Q
11	1	LaDonna Antoine-Watkins	Canada	52.44	
12	1	Helen Frost	England	52.71	
13	1	Doris Jacob	Nigeria	52.88	
14	2	Foy Williams	Canada	53.21	
15	1	Melanie Purkiss	England	53.32	
16	2	Jane Arnott	New Zealand	53.49	

=== Final ===
Rank	Name	Nationality	Time	Notes
1st place, gold medalist(s)	Aliann Pompey	Guyana	51.63	
2nd place, silver medalist(s)	Lee McConnell	Scotland	51.68	
3rd place, bronze medalist(s)	Sandie Richards	Jamaica	51.79	
4	Allison Beckford	Jamaica	51.81	
5	Heide Seyerling	South Africa	52.87	
6	Catherine Murphy	Wales	52.91	
7	Hortense Bewouda	Cameroon	53.00	
8	Christine Amertil	Bahamas	53.45	
