= 2004 African Championships in Athletics – Women's 400 metres =

The women's 400 metres event at the 2004 African Championships in Athletics was held in Brazzaville, Republic of the Congo on July 15–16.

== Medalists ==
Gold	Silver	Bronze
Fatou Bintou Fall; Senegal	Kaltouma Nadjina; Chad	Hortense Bewouda; Cameroon

== Results ==
=== Heats ===
Rank	Heat	Name	Nationality	Time	Notes
1	1	Fatou Bintou Fall	Senegal	52.62	Q
2	1	Estie Wittstock	South Africa	52.81	Q
3	1	Muriel Noah Ahanda	Cameroon	53.84	
4	1	Sandrine Thiébaud-Kangni	Togo	54.03	
5	1	Justine Bayigga	Uganda	54.76	
	1	Christy Ekpukhon	Nigeria	DNF	
1	2	Hortense Béwouda	Cameroon	53.82	Q
2	2	Heide Seyerling	South Africa	53.94	Q
3	2	Amantle Montsho	Botswana	54.06	NR
4	2	Silba Tjingaete	Namibia	57.70	
	2	Gloria Amuche Nwosu	Nigeria	DQ	
1	3	Mireille Nguimgo	Cameroon	51.96	Q
2	3	Kaltouma Nadjina	Chad	52.31	q
3	3	Ngozi Nwokocha	Nigeria	53.26	q
4	3	Josephine Nyarunda	Kenya	53.82	
	3	Awatef Ben Hassine	Tunisia	DQ	Doping

=== Final ===
Rank	Name	Nationality	Time	Notes
1st place, gold medalist(s)	Fatou Bintou Fall	Senegal	50.62	
2nd place, silver medalist(s)	Kaltouma Nadjina	Chad	50.80	
3rd place, bronze medalist(s)	Hortense Béwouda	Cameroon	51.15	
4	Mireille Nguimgo	Cameroon	51.20	
5	Heide Seyerling	South Africa	51.67	
6	Estie Wittstock	South Africa	51.85	
	Awatef Ben Hassine	Tunisia	DQ	Doping
	Ngozi Nwokocha	Nigeria	DNF	
