= Athletics at the 2002 Commonwealth Games – Women's 4 × 400 metres relay =

Women's 4 × 400 metres relay at the Commonwealth Games

The women's 4 × 400 metres relay event at the 2002 Commonwealth Games was held on July 30–31.

== Medalists ==
Gold	Silver	Bronze
Australia; Lauren Hewitt; Cathy Freeman; Tamsyn Lewis; Jana Pittman; Kylie Wheeler*	England; Helen Frost; Helen Karagounis; Melanie Purkiss; Lisa Miller; Jenny Meadows*	Nigeria; Olabisi Afolabi; Kudirat Akhigbe; Hajarat Yusuf; Doris Jacob

* Athletes who competed in heats only and received medals.

== Results ==
=== Heats ===
Qualification: First 3 teams of each heat (Q) plus the next 2 fastest (q) qualified for the final.

Rank	Heat	Nation	Athletes	Time	Notes
1	2	England	Helen Frost, Helen Karagounis, Jenny Meadows, Lisa Miller	3:30.63	Q
2	1	Jamaica	Ronetta Smith, Lorraine Fenton, Charmaine Howell, Debbie-Ann Parris	3:31.99	Q
3	2	Nigeria	Olabisi Afolabi, Kudirat Akhigbe, Hajarat Yusuf, Doris Jacob	3:32.38	Q
4	2	Canada	Foy Williams, Karlene Haughton, Lindsay Lochhead, LaDonna Antoine-Watkins	3:33.23	Q
5	1	Australia	Kylie Wheeler, Cathy Freeman, Tamsyn Lewis, Jana Pittman	3:33.25	Q
6	2	Scotland	Gemma Nicol, Susan Burnside, Carey Easton, Sinead Dudgeon	3:36.41	q
7	1	Cameroon	Hortense Bewouda, Carole Kaboud Mebam, Muriel Noah Ahanda, Mireille Nguimgo	3:38.24	Q
8	1	Trinidad and Tobago	Adia McKinnon, Fana Ashby, Melissa de Leon, Nickeisha Charles	3:43.10	q
9	2	Cyprus	Gavriella Sofocleous, Anny Christofidou, Theodora Kyriakou, Alissa Kallinikou	3:46.27	
10	1	Fiji	Makelesi Bulikiobo, Sisilia Dauniwe, Mereoni Raluve, Vasiti Vatureba	3:48.23	

=== Final ===
Rank	Nation	Athletes	Time	Notes
1st place, gold medalist(s)	Australia	Lauren Hewitt, Cathy Freeman, Tamsyn Lewis, Jana Pittman	3:25.63	GR
2nd place, silver medalist(s)	England	Helen Frost, Helen Karagounis, Melanie Purkiss, Lisa Miller	3:26.73	
3rd place, bronze medalist(s)	Nigeria	Olabisi Afolabi, Kudirat Akhigbe, Hajarat Yusuf, Doris Jacob	3:29.16	
4	Scotland	Carey Easton, Sinead Dudgeon, Susan Burnside, Lee McConnell	3:31.50	NR
5	Canada	Foy Williams, LaDonna Antoine-Watkins, Karlene Haughton, Lami Oyewumi	3:32.24	
6	Cameroon	Hortense Bewouda, Muriel Noah Ahanda, Mireille Nguimgo, Carole Kaboud Mebam	3:32.74	NR
7	Trinidad and Tobago	Adia McKinnon, Fana Ashby, Melissa de Leon, Nickeisha Charles	3:39.14	
	Jamaica	Allison Beckford, Lorraine Fenton, Debbie-Ann Parris, Sandie Richards	DNF	
