= 2001 African Junior Athletics Championships =

5th African Junior Championships
- Dates: 9 – 12 July
- Host city: Réduit, Mauritius
- Level: Under-20
- Events: 41

The 2001 African Junior Athletics Championships was the fifth edition of the biennial, continental athletics tournament for African athletes aged 19 years or younger. It was held in Réduit, Mauritius, from 9–12 July. A total of 41 events were contested, 21 by men and 20 by women.

== Medal summary ==
=== Men ===
Event	Gold		Silver		Bronze	
100 metres	Henrico Louis (MRI)	10.79	Gareth Roelf (RSA)	10.97	Djibril Diatta (SEN)	11.08
200 metres	Ommanandsingh Kowlessur (MRI)	21.66	Lewis Banda (ZIM)	21.92	Mandla Nkosi (RSA)	22.15
400 metres	Mandla Nkosi (RSA)	47.13	Lewis Banda (ZIM)	47.35	Jacob Ramokoka (RSA)	48.06
800 metres	Cornelius Chirchir (KEN)	1:49.02	Amine Laâlou (MAR)	1:49.94	Philemon Tanui (KEN)	1:49.99
1500 metres	Cornelius Chirchir (KEN)	3:41.16	Philemon Tanui (KEN)	3:42.72	Habtai Kifletsion (ERI)	3:42.82
5000 metres	Boniface Toroitich Kiprop (UGA)	13:48.6	Solomon Bushendich (KEN)	13:49.9	Henry Kipchirchir (KEN)	14:01.0
10,000 metres	Solomon Bushendich (KEN)	28:40.36	Boniface Toroitich Kiprop (UGA)	28:45.76	Ali Abdalla (ERI)	29:27.10
110 metres hurdles (Wind: +2.6 m/s)	Janko Kotze (RSA)	14.38 w	Chafik Kalila (MAR)	15.22 w	Hamdi Dhouibi (TUN)	15.37 w
400 metres hurdles	Ter de Villiers (RSA)	50.76	Rachid Malki (MAR)	52.37	Chafik Kalila (MAR)	53.64
3000 metres steeplechase	Ezekiel Kemboi (KEN)	8:39.80	Michael Kipyego (KEN)	8:41.26	Abdelatif Chemlal (MAR)	8:55.76
4 × 100 m relay	Mauritius (MRI); Mervin Buckland; Henrico Louis; Ommanandsingh Kowlessur; Jonathan Chimier	41.50	Seychelles (SEY); Tony Hoareau; Flore Evans; Eddy Lozaique; Marvis Confait	43.20	Morocco (MAR); Rachid Malki; Chafik Kalila; Ouadih Naciri; Hicham Chliyeh	43.74
4 × 400 m relay	South Africa (RSA); Jacob Ramokoka; Ter de Villiers; Johan Cronje; Mandla Nkosi	3:14.14	Morocco (MAR); Rachid Malki; Chafik Kalila; Abdellatif El-Ghazaoui; Amine Laâlou	3:17.67	Mauritius (MRI); Pascal Fleur; Henrico Louis; David Mortimerdo; Ommanandsingh Kowlessur	3:22.33
10,000 metres walk	Abderrahmane Rahma (ALG)	47:29.9	Ismail Bendoumia (ALG)	47:50.7	Mahmoud Mohamed (EGY)	48:21.2
High jump	Idrissa Ndoye (SEN)	2.10 m	Adel Abou Maati (EGY)	2.10 m	Kousse Kone (MLI)	2.04 m
Pole vault	Hamdi Dhouibi (TUN)	4.60 m	Mohamed Karbib (MAR)	4.05 m	David Thomassoo (MRI)	3.90 m
Long jump	Jonathan Chimier (MRI)	7.48 m	Abdou Lam (SEN)	7.31 m	Hamdi Dhouibi (TUN)	7.18 m
Triple jump	Abdou Lam (SEN)	15.11 m	Ndiss Kaba Badji (SEN)	15.09 m	Idir Fellah (ALG)	15.02 m
Shot put	Yasser Ibrahim Farag (EGY)	15.44 m	Selwyn Beauchamp (SEY)	13.76 m	Nabil Kirame (MAR)	13.65 m
Discus throw	Ihab Ahmed (EGY)	50.07 m	Omar El-Ghazaly (EGY)	49.79 m	Nabil Kirame (MAR)	44.57 m
Hammer throw	Nicolas Li Yung Fong (MRI)	59.44 m	Mohsen Anany (EGY)	57.11 m	Ahmed Ben Ahmed (TUN)	55.27 m
Javelin throw	Willie Human (RSA)	77.45 m	James Oyewoh (NGR)	69.53 m	Sadek Al-Mohsen (EGY)	64.36 m

=== Women ===
Event	Gold		Silver		Bronze	
100 metres	Ibifuro Tobin-West (NGR)	11.86	Amal Tayssir (MAR)	12.17	Geraldine Elysee (MRI)	12.39
200 metres	Kate Obilor (NGR)	24.22	Hajarat Yusuf (NGR)	24.61	Pulane Sekonyana (LES)	25.38
400 metres	Gloria Nwosu (NGR)	54.10	Hajarat Yusuf (NGR)	55.09	Houria El-Mohandis (MAR)	58.68
800 metres	Alice Nwosu (NGR)	2:04.70	Janeth Jepkosgei (KEN)	2:06.21	Mary Bacia (UGA)	2:08.51
1500 metres	Zanelle Grobler (RSA)	4:23.33	Berhane Herpassa (ETH)	4:23.35	Eliane Saholinirina (MAD)	4:24.76
5000 metres	Vivian Cheruiyot (KEN)	16:19.54	Caroline Chepkwony (KEN)	16:23.77	Simret Sultan (ERI)	16:58.23
10,000 metres	Caroline Chepkwony (KEN)	35:04.96	Christiana Augustine (NGR)	37:22.90	Séraphine Murékatété (RWA)	38:06.19
400 metres hurdles	Kate Obilor (NGR)	60.14	Houria El-Mohandis (MAR)	63.66	Only two competitors	
4 × 100 m relay	Mauritius (MRI); Sharonne Cerveaux; Josiane Perrine; Sandrine Duval; Geraldine Elysee	49.15	Only one team finished			
4 × 400 m relay	Nigeria (NGR); Hajarat Yusuf; Gloria Nwosu; Kate Obilor; Alice Nwosu	3:50.53	Mauritius (MRI); Sandrine Duval; Sylvia Bosquet; Mary Jane Flore; Geraldine Elysee	4:04.75	Morocco (MAR); Hanane Ouhaddou; Amal Tayssir; Malika Asahssah; Houria El-Mohandis	4:11.67
5000 metres walk	Nicolene Cronje (RSA)	24:48.89	Leeann Watts (RSA)	25:28.60	Souad Kifani (ALG)	26:04.61
High jump	Marizca Gertenbach (RSA)	1.77 m	Gloria Nwosu (NGR)	1.68 m	Arielle Brette (MRI)	1.55 m
Pole vault	Maha Mohamed (EGY)	3.35 m	Amina Chahreddine (ALG) Nancy Cheekoussen (MRI)	2.90 m	Not awarded	
Long jump	Ibifuro Tobin-West (NGR)	5.93 m	Sarah Bouaoudia (ALG)	5.77 m	Natacha Bibi (SEY)	5.34 m
Triple jump	Mahaliana Ramanitra (MAD)	12.07 m	Josiane Perrine (MRI)	11.45 m	Only two athletes had a valid jump	
Shot put	Helda Marie (SEY)	13.58 m	Amal Salem (EGY)	13.08 m	Hiba Saad (EGY)	12.94 m
Discus throw	Amina Moudden (MAR)	45.55 m	Nourine Ahmed (EGY)	42.36 m	Chichi Edeh (NGR)	42.34 m
Hammer throw	Rawd Hussein (EGY)	48.79 m	Joanna Bhoyroo (MRI)	42.31 m	Karima Mouhoubi (ALG)	41.31 m
Javelin throw	Hana'a Omar (EGY)	45.30 m	Patricia Léopold (MRI)	37.16 m	Joanna Bhoyroo (MRI)	17.22 m
Heptathlon	Gloria Nwosu (NGR)	5111 pts	Imène Chatbri (TUN)	4834 pts	Soraya Mehdioui (ALG)	4438 pts
