= Athletics at the 2003 All-Africa Games – Women's 400 metres =

The women's 400 metres at the 2003 All-Africa Games were held on October 12–13.

== Medalists ==
Gold	Silver	Bronze
Fatou Bintou Fall; Senegal	Doris Jacob; Nigeria	Mireille Nguimgo; Cameroon

== Results ==
=== Heats ===
Qualification: First 2 of each heat (Q) and the next 2 fastest (q) qualified for the semifinal.

Rank	Heat	Name	Nationality	Time	Notes
1	1	Bisi Afolabi	Nigeria	51.47	Q
2	1	Mireille Nguimgo	Cameroon	51.50	Q
3	1	Estie Wittstock	South Africa	51.71	q
4	3	Fatou Bintou Fall	Senegal	51.77	Q
5	2	Doris Jacob	Nigeria	52.03	Q
6	3	Glory Nwosu	Nigeria	52.33	Q
7	2	Hortense Béwouda	Cameroon	52.36	Q
8	3	Heide Seyerling	South Africa	52.78	q
9	1	Awatef Benhassine	Tunisia	53.56	
10	3	Muriel Noah Ahanda	Cameroon	54.15	
11	1	Kundai Sengudzwa	Zimbabwe	54.33	
12	3	Muna Jabir Adam	Sudan	54.43	
13	2	Sandrine Thiébaud-Kangni	Togo	54.65	
14	2	Amantle Montsho	Botswana	55.06	
15	2	Netsanet Getu	Ethiopia	55.56	
16	2	Claudine Yemalin	Benin	56.66	
17	1	Silba Tjingaete	Namibia	57.19	
18	1	Rebica Chinesho	Ethiopia	59.94	
	1	Selebaleng Seomile	Botswana	DNF	
	2	Shewit Tesfagebriel	Eritrea	DNF	
	2	Sylla M'Mah Touré	Guinea	DNF	
	3	Evodie Saramndji	Central African Republic	DNS	
	3	Justine Bayiga	Uganda	DNS	
	3	Larissa Bakasa	Zimbabwe	DNS	

=== Final ===
Rank	Name	Nationality	Time	Notes
1st place, gold medalist(s)	Fatou Bintou Fall	Senegal	51.38	
2nd place, silver medalist(s)	Doris Jacob	Nigeria	51.41	
3rd place, bronze medalist(s)	Mireille Nguimgo	Cameroon	51.59	
4	Estie Wittstock	South Africa	51.81	
5	Hortense Béwouda	Cameroon	51.96	
6	Heide Seyerling	South Africa	52.45	
7	Glory Nwosu	Nigeria	52.47	
8	Bisi Afolabi	Nigeria	52.77	

== Sources ==
- Results
- Results
