= 2003 IAAF World Indoor Championships – Women's 400 metres =

The women's 400 metres event at the 2003 IAAF World Indoor Championships was held on March 14–16.

== Medalists ==
Gold	Silver	Bronze
Natalya Nazarova; Russia	Christine Amertil; Bahamas	Grit Breuer; Germany

== Results ==
=== Heats ===
First 2 of each heat (Q) and next 2 fastest (q) qualified for the semifinals.

Rank	Heat	Name	Nationality	Time	Notes
1	3	Natalya Nazarova	Russia	51.24	Q
2	3	Catherine Murphy	Great Britain	51.89	Q, SB
3	1	Tonique Williams-Darling	Bahamas	52.04	Q, PB
4	5	Grit Breuer	Germany	52.10	Q
5	2	Christine Amertil	Bahamas	52.15	Q
6	4	Sviatlana Usovich	Belarus	52.20	Q
7	5	Sandie Richards	Jamaica	52.46	Q
8	1	Yuliya Pechenkina	Russia	52.62	Q
9	5	Grażyna Prokopek	Poland	52.72	q, NR
10	1	Jennifer Meadows	Great Britain	52.74	q, PB
11	2	Monique Hennagan	United States	52.83	Q
12	4	Aliann Pompey	Guyana	52.86	Q, SB
13	4	Kaltouma Nadjina	Chad	53.50	
14	1	Sandrine Thiébaud-Kangni	Togo	53.51	
15	1	Monika Niederstatter	Italy	53.57	
16	2	Karen Shinkins	Ireland	53.59	
17	4	Antonina Yefremova	Ukraine	53.64	
18	2	Carmo Tavares	Portugal	53.65	
19	3	Ronetta Smith	Jamaica	53.66	SB
20	5	Awatef Ben Hassine	Tunisia	54.01	
21	5	Geisa Aparecida Coutinho	Brazil	54.23	
22	1	Tiffany Barnes	United States	54.38	
23	3	Maria Teresa Schutzmann	Italy	54.51	
24	2	K.V.Damayanthi Dharsha	Sri Lanka	54.61	
25	5	Yvonne Harrison	Puerto Rico	56.17	
26	2	Klodiana Shala	Albania	57.81	
27	4	Salhate Djamaldine	Comoros	58.88	
	3	Mireille Nguimgo	Cameroon	DQ	
	4	Karla Hernández	El Salvador	DQ	

=== Semifinals ===
First 2 of each semifinal (Q) qualified directly for the final.

Rank	Heat	Name	Nationality	Time	Notes
1	1	Natalya Nazarova	Russia	50.90	Q
2	1	Christine Amertil	Bahamas	51.11	Q, NR
3	2	Grit Breuer	Germany	51.56	Q, SB
4	2	Catherine Murphy	Great Britain	51.74	Q, PB
5	2	Monique Hennagan	United States	51.89	Q, PB
6	1	Sviatlana Usovich	Belarus	52.18	Q
7	1	Sandie Richards	Jamaica	52.20	SB
8	1	Aliann Pompey	Guyana	52.74	SB
9	2	Grażyna Prokopek	Poland	53.07	
10	1	Jennifer Meadows	Great Britain	53.36	
	2	Yuliya Pechenkina	Russia	DQ	
	2	Tonique Williams-Darling	Bahamas	DQ	

=== Final ===
Rank	Name	Nationality	Time	Notes
1st place, gold medalist(s)	Natalya Nazarova	Russia	50.83	
2nd place, silver medalist(s)	Christine Amertil	Bahamas	51.11	NR
3rd place, bronze medalist(s)	Grit Breuer	Germany	51.13	SB
4	Catherine Murphy	Great Britain	51.99	
5	Monique Hennagan	United States	52.08	
6	Sviatlana Usovich	Belarus	52.72	
