= Heide Seyerling =

South African sprinter (born 1976)

Medal record

Women's athletics

Representing South Africa

African Championships
Gold medal – first place	2006 Bambous	4×400 m
Silver medal – second place	2004 Brazzaville	4×100 m
Silver medal – second place	2004 Brazzaville	4×400 m
Bronze medal – third place	1998 Dakar	200 m

Heide Seyerling (born 19 August 1976) is a former South African athlete, born in Port Elizabeth, specializing in the 200 and 400 metres. She twice competed at the Olympic Games, in 2000 and 2004. At the 2000 Games she reached the 400 metres final finishing 6th with a new (and still standing now) national record of 50.05. She is married to former sprinter Mathew Quinn.

== Competition record ==
Year	Competition	Venue	Position	Event	Notes
Representing South Africa
1994	African Junior Championships	Algiers, Algeria	2nd	100 m	11.69
1994	African Junior Championships	Algiers, Algeria	1st	200 m	23.59
1994	African Junior Championships	Algiers, Algeria	2nd	4 × 100 m relay	46.15
1994	World Junior Championships	Lisbon, Portugal	10th (sf)	100m	11.62 (wind: +0.8 m/s)
1994	World Junior Championships	Lisbon, Portugal	1st	200m	22.80 w (wind: +2.2 m/s)
1994	World Junior Championships	Lisbon, Portugal	2nd (h)	4 × 100 m relay	45.63
1995	World Championships	Gothenburg, Sweden	–	200 m	DQ
1998	African Championships	Dakar, Senegal	3rd	200 m	22.89
1998	Commonwealth Games	Kuala Lumpur, Malaysia	5th	200 m	23.07
1999	World Championships	Edmonton, Canada	38th (h)	200 m	23.59
1999	World Championships	Edmonton, Canada	11th (h)	4 × 100 m relay	44.35
1999	All-Africa Games	Johannesburg, South Africa	5th (h)	200 m	23.31
1999	All-Africa Games	Johannesburg, South Africa	7th	400 m	52.27
2000	Olympic Games	Sydney, Australia	6th	400 m	50.05 (NR)
2001	World Championships	Edmonton, Canada	9th (sf)	400 m	50.87
2002	Commonwealth Games	Manchester, United Kingdom	5th	400 m	52.87
2002	African Championships	Radès, Tunisia	6th (h)	400 m	53.81
2003	World Championships	Paris, France	20th (sf)	400 m	51.89
2003	All-Africa Games	Abuja, Nigeria	6th	400 m	52.45
2003	All-Africa Games	Abuja, Nigeria	2nd	4 × 100 m relay	44.44
2004	African Championships	Brazzaville, Republic of the Congo	5th	400 m	51.67
2004	African Championships	Brazzaville, Republic of the Congo	2nd	4 × 100 m relay	44.42
2004	African Championships	Brazzaville, Republic of the Congo	2nd	4 × 400 m relay	3:30.12
2004	Olympic Games	Athens, Greece	37th (h)	200 m	23.66
2006	African Championships	Bambous, Mauritius	4th	400 m	53.26
2006	African Championships	Bambous, Mauritius	1st	4 × 400 m relay	3:36.88

== Personal bests ==
- 100 m – 11.35 (-0.3) (Durban 1999)
- 200 m – 22.63 (+1.8) (Durban 2001)
- 400 m – 50.05 (Sydney 2000)
