= Glaz =

Glaz or Głaz is a surname. Notable people with the name include:

- Anatoly Glaz (born 1982), diplomat and spokesperson of the Ministry of Foreign Affairs of Belarus
- Dan Glaz, American runner, competed in the 2002 World Junior Championships in Athletics – Men's 10,000 metres
- Herta Glaz (1910–2006), Austrian-born American opera singer and director
- Lena Glaz (born 1961), Israeli chess player
- Olga Glaz, Russian weightlifter, competed in the 2001 World Weightlifting Championships – Women's 63 kg
- Sarah Glaz (born 1947), Romanian-Israeli-American mathematician and poet

== See also ==
- Auguste François Marie Glaziou, a biologist referred to by the standard abbreviation Glaz
- the Udmurt name of Glazov, a city in the Udmurt Republic of Russia
