= 2004 African Championships in Athletics – Women's 4 × 400 metres relay =

The women's 4 × 400 metres relay event at the 2004 African Championships in Athletics was held in Brazzaville, Republic of the Congo on July 18.

== Results ==
Rank	Nation	Competitors	Time	Notes
1st place, gold medalist(s)	Senegal	Fatou Bintou Fall, Tacko Diouf, Aïda Diop, Amy Mbacké Thiam	3:29.41	
2nd place, silver medalist(s)	South Africa	Surita Febbraio, Adri Schoeman, Heide Seyerling, Estie Wittstock	3:30.12	NR
3rd place, bronze medalist(s)	Cameroon	Hortense Béwouda, Carole Kaboud Mebam, Muriel Noah, Delphine Atangana	3:30.77	
4	Nigeria	Ngozi Nwokocha, Gloria Nwosu, Halimat Ismaila, Christy Ekpukhon	3:30.84	
5	Morocco	Zahra Lachgar, Noual Baybi, Saïda El Mehdi, Hanane Skhyi	3:44.16	
6	Republic of the Congo	Rose Biantouari, Belbick Onsso, Michelle Banga Moundzoula, Léontine Tsiba	3:55.29	NR
7	Mali	Mah Koné, Ramatoulaye Gassama, Yah Koita, Dipa Traoré	4:04.95	
