= 2002 African Championships in Athletics – Women's 4 × 400 metres relay =

The women's 4 × 400 metres relay event at the 2002 African Championships in Athletics was held in Radès, Tunisia on August 10.

== Results ==
Rank	Nation	Competitors	Time	Notes
1st place, gold medalist(s)	Cameroon	Hortense Béwouda, Carole Kaboud Mebam, Myriam Léonie Mani, Mireille Nguimgo	3:35.33	
2nd place, silver medalist(s)	Nigeria	Hajarat Yusuf, Oluyemi Fagbamila, Pauline Ibeagha, Kudirat Akhigbe	3:38.25	
3rd place, bronze medalist(s)	Algeria	Houria Moussa, Sarah Bouaoudia, Nahida Touhami, Sarah Arrous	3:39.70	NR
4	Tunisia	Maha Chaouachi, Amel Tlili, Abir Nakhli, Awatef Ben Hassine	3:41.74	
5	Botswana	G. Samson, Khumoetsile Gakelkanme, Selebal Sedmile, Tshotlego Morama	3:56.67	
	Morocco		DNS	
	Senegal		DNS	
