= 2002 African Championships in Athletics – Women's 400 metres =

The women's 400 metres event at the 2002 African Championships in Athletics was held in Radès, Tunisia on August 7–8.

== Medalists ==
Gold	Silver	Bronze
Nadjina Kaltouma; Chad	Mireille Nguimgo; Cameroon	Awatef Ben Hassine; Tunisia

== Results ==
=== Heats ===
Rank	Heat	Name	Nationality	Time	Notes
1	1	Mireille Nguimgo	Cameroon	52.47	Q
2	3	Nadjina Kaltouma	Chad	52.69	Q
3	1	Hortense Béwouda	Cameroon	52.92	Q
4	1	Awatef Ben Hassine	Tunisia	52.97	q
5	1	Kudirat Akhigbe	Nigeria	53.56	q
6	3	Heide Seyerling	South Africa	53.81	Q
7	2	Amy Mbacké Thiam	Senegal	54.02	Q
8	1	Doris Jacob	Nigeria	54.14	
9	3	Sandrine Thiébaud-Kangni	Togo	54.16	
10	2	Hajarat Yusuf	Nigeria	55.00	Q
11	3	Maha Chaouachi	Tunisia	55.86	
12	2	Fatou Bintou Fall	Senegal	56.10	
13	3	Sarah Arrous	Algeria	56.13	
14	2	Silpa Tjingaate	Namibia	56.83	
15	1	Geraldine Elysee	Mauritius	58.01	
16	3	Sana Najeh	Tunisia	1:00.42	
17	1	Selebal Sedmile	Botswana	1:01.32	
18	2	Sylla M'Mah Touré	Guinea	1:03.92	
18	2	Berikty Weldai	Eritrea	1:07.35	
	2	Ageritu Belete	Ethiopia	DNS	

=== Final ===
Rank	Name	Nationality	Time	Notes
1st place, gold medalist(s)	Nadjina Kaltouma	Chad	51.09	
2nd place, silver medalist(s)	Mireille Nguimgo	Cameroon	51.61	
3rd place, bronze medalist(s)	Awatef Ben Hassine	Tunisia	52.22	
4	Hortense Béwouda	Cameroon	52.26	
5	Kudirat Akhigbe	Nigeria	52.81	
6	Hajarat Yusuf	Nigeria	53.66	
	Amy Mbacké Thiam	Senegal	DNS	
	Heide Seyerling	South Africa	DNS	
