= 2002 African Championships in Athletics – Women's 400 metres hurdles =

The women's 400 metres hurdles event at the 2002 African Championships in Athletics was held in Radès, Tunisia on August 7.

== Results ==
Rank	Name	Nationality	Time	Notes
1st place, gold medalist(s)	Zahra Lachguer	Morocco	57.91	
2nd place, silver medalist(s)	Carole Kaboud Mebam	Cameroon	58.11	
3rd place, bronze medalist(s)	Mame Tacko Diouf	Senegal	58.86	
4	Lantosoa Razafinjanahary	Madagascar	1:00.97	
5	Awatef Ben Hassine	Tunisia	1:03.91	
6	Christiane Yao	Ivory Coast	1:06.45	
