= 2001 World Championships in Athletics – Women's 400 metres =

These are the official results of the Women's 400 metres event at the 2001 IAAF World Championships in Edmonton, Canada.

== Medalists ==
Gold	Amy Mbacké Thiam; Senegal (SEN)
Silver	Lorraine Fenton; Jamaica (JAM)
Bronze	Ana Guevara; Mexico (MEX)

== Results ==
=== Heats ===
Qualification: First 3 in each semifinal (Q) and the next 6 fastest (q) advance to the semifinals.

Rank	Heat	Name	Nationality	Time	Notes
1	5	Grit Breuer	Germany	50.71	Q
2	4	Ana Guevara	Mexico	50.99	Q
2	6	Amy Mbacké Thiam	Senegal	50.99	Q
4	6	Mireille Nguimgo	Cameroon	51.09	Q, SB
5	4	Anastasiya Kapachinskaya	Russia	51.12	Q
5	5	Monique Hennagan	United States	51.12	Q, SB
7	1	Kaltouma Nadjina	Chad	51.24	Q
8	2	Michelle Collins	United States	51.26	Q
9	5	Karen Shinkins	Ireland	51.37	Q, SB
10	1	Demetria Washington	United States	51.50	Q
11	3	Olesya Zykina	Russia	51.56	Q
12	1	Sandie Richards	Jamaica	51.71	Q
13	4	Florence Ekpo-Umoh	Germany	51.77	Q
14	1	Natallia Solohub	Belarus	51.78	q
14	6	Heide Seyerling	South Africa	51.78	Q
16	3	Falilat Ogunkoya	Nigeria	51.79	Q
17	2	Lorraine Fenton	Jamaica	51.80	Q
18	4	Grażyna Prokopek	Poland	51.92	q, PB
19	5	Donna Fraser	Great Britain	52.02	q, SB
20	2	Claudia Marx	Germany	52.03	Q
21	4	K. Mathews Beenamol	India	52.17	q, SB
22	5	Aliann Pompey	Guyana	52.20	q
23	6	K.V.Damayanthi Dharsha	Sri Lanka	52.21	q
24	2	Otilia Ruicu	Romania	52.33	
25	1	Anna Kozak	Belarus	52.35	Q
26	6	LaDonna Antoine	Canada	52.38	
27	3	Catherine Murphy	Great Britain	52.40	
28	3	Francine Landre	France	52.57	
28	5	Jane Arnott	New Zealand	52.57	SB
30	5	Natalya Antyukh	Russia	52.71	
31	2	Foy Williams	Canada	52.92	
32	1	Zana Minina	Lithuania	52.98	
33	3	Christine Amertil	Bahamas	53.07	
34	6	Allison Beckford	Jamaica	53.08	
35	6	Jitka Burianova	Czech Republic	53.29	
36	4	Nova Peris	Australia	53.55	
37	2	Carmo Tavares	Portugal	54.08	
38	3	Julia Alba	Spain	54.73	
39	4	Tsvetelina Kirilova	Bulgaria	54.82	
40	1	Gretta Taslakian	Lebanon	57.06	PB
41	3	Mereoni Raluve	Fiji	58.03	
42	2	Gladys Mateyo	Zambia	59.30	
	1	Alena Petrova	Turkmenistan	DQ	
	2	Verica Dimitrovska	Macedonia	DQ	
	6	Klodiana Shala	Albania	DQ	
	1	Sandrine Kangni	Togo	DNS	
	4	Odonsuren Oyuntuya	Mongolia	DNS	

=== Semifinals ===
Qualification: First 2 in each semifinal (Q) and the next 2 fastest (q) advance to the final.

Rank	Heat	Name	Nationality	Time	Notes
1	2	Amy Mbacké Thiam	Senegal	50.21	Q, NR
2	1	Grit Breuer	Germany	50.32	Q
3	2	Kaltouma Nadjina	Chad	50.38	Q, NR
4	2	Falilat Ogunkoya	Nigeria	50.50	q, SB
5	3	Ana Guevara	Mexico	50.58	Q
6	1	Olesya Zykina	Russia	50.59	Q
7	3	Lorraine Fenton	Jamaica	50.61	Q, SB
8	1	Mireille Nguimgo	Cameroon	50.71	q, SB
9	2	Heide Seyerling	South Africa	50.87	
10	2	Monique Hennagan	United States	50.98	SB
11	3	Michelle Collins	United States	51.22	
12	1	Demetria Washington	United States	51.26	PB
13	2	Sandie Richards	Jamaica	51.40	
14	3	Florence Ekpo-Umoh	Germany	51.47	
15	1	Karen Shinkins	Ireland	51.66	
16	3	Anastasiya Kapachinskaya	Russia	51.68	
17	2	Claudia Marx	Germany	51.75	
18	3	Donna Fraser	Great Britain	51.77	SB
19	1	K.V.Damayanthi Dharsha	Sri Lanka	51.83	SB
20	3	Aliann Pompey	Guyana	51.96	PB
21	3	Anna Kozak	Belarus	52.13	
22	1	Grażyna Prokopek	Poland	52.28	
23	2	K. Mathews Beenamol	India	52.68	
	2	Natallia Solohub	Belarus	DQ	

=== Final ===
Rank	Lane	Name	Nationality	Time	Notes
1st place, gold medalist(s)	4	Amy Mbacké Thiam	Senegal	49.86	NR
2nd place, silver medalist(s)	7	Lorraine Fenton	Jamaica	49.88	SB
3rd place, bronze medalist(s)	3	Ana Guevara	Mexico	49.97	SB
4	5	Grit Breuer	Germany	50.49	
5	6	Kaltouma Nadjina	Chad	50.80	
6	2	Olesya Zykina	Russia	50.93	
7	1	Mireille Nguimgo	Cameroon	51.97	
	8	Falilat Ogunkoya	Nigeria	DNF	
