= Naibei =

Naibei is a surname. Notable people with the surname include:

- Abraham Naibei Cheroben (born 1992), Bahraini long-distance runner
- Solomon Naibei Bushendich (born 1984), Kenyan long-distance runner
