= 2002 African Championships in Athletics – Women's high jump =

The women's high jump event at the 2002 African Championships in Athletics was held in Radès, Tunisia on August 6.

== Results ==
Rank	Name	Nationality	Result	Notes
1st place, gold medalist(s)	Hestrie Cloete	South Africa	1.95	
2nd place, silver medalist(s)	Amina Lemgherbi	Algeria	1.70	
3rd place, bronze medalist(s)	Hanen Dhouibi	Tunisia	1.70	
	Karima Ben Othmani	Tunisia	DNS	
	Yah Soucko Koïta	Mali	DNS	
