= Doris Jacob =

Nigerian sprinter (born 1981)

Personal information
- Born: 16 December 1981 (age 44) Kano, Nigeria

Sport
- Sport: Track and field
Medal record
Representing Nigeria
Commonwealth Games
Bronze medal – third place	2002 Manchester	400 m
Summer Universiade
Bronze medal – third place	1999 Palma de Mallorca	400 m
African Games
Silver medal – second place	2003 Abuja	400 m
African Championships
Gold medal – first place	1998 Dakar	4×400 m

Doris Jacob (born 16 December 1981) is a Nigerian sprinter who specializes in the 400 metres.

Duah finished seventh in 4 x 400 metres relay at the 1997 World Championships, together with teammates Olabisi Afolabi, Fatima Yusuf and Falilat Ogunkoya. Participating in this event at the 2000 Summer Olympics, the team with Jacob, Afolabi, Rosemary Okafor and Charity Opara set a national record of 3:22.99 minutes in their heat. Jacob also helped win a bronze medal at the 2002 Commonwealth Games.

On the individual level, Jacob won a silver medal at the 2003 All-Africa Games and a bronze medal at the 1999 Summer Universiade, the latter in a personal best time of 51.04 seconds.

== Achievements ==
Year	Competition	Venue	Position	Event	Notes
Representing Nigeria
1997	World Championships	Athens, Greece	7th	4 × 400 m relay	3:30.04
1999	Universiade	Palma de Mallorca, Spain	3rd	400 m	51.04
2000	Olympic Games	Sydney, Australia	1st (h)	4 × 400 m relay	3:22.99
2001	Universiade	Beijing, China	8th	4 × 400 m relay	3:48.92
2002	Commonwealth Games	Manchester, United Kingdom	13th (sf)	400 m	52.88
2002	Commonwealth Games	Manchester, United Kingdom	3rd	4 × 400 m relay	3:29.16
2002	African Championships	Radès, Tunisia	8th (h)	400 m	54.14
2003	All-Africa Games	Abuja, Nigeria	2nd	400 m	51.41
2003	Afro-Asian Games	Hyderabad, India	2nd	400 m	53.08
