= Fatou Bintou Fall =

Senegalese sprinter

Personal information
- Born: 23 August 1981 (age 44) Tivaouane, Senegal

Sport
- Sport: Track and field
Medal record
Representing Senegal
African Championships
Gold medal – first place	2004 Brazzaville	400 m
Gold medal – first place	2004 Brazzaville	4×400 m
Summer Universiade
Gold medal – first place	2009 Belgrade	400m
Silver medal – second place	2005 Izmir	400m
Bronze medal – third place	2009 Belgrade	4x400m relay

Fatou Bintou Fall (born 23 August 1981 in Tivaouane) is a Senegalese sprinter, who mainly competes in the 400 metres. She set her personal best at the 2004 African Championships, claiming the gold medal: 50.62 seconds.

== Competition record ==
Year	Competition	Venue	Position	Event	Notes
Representing Senegal
1999	African Junior Championships	Tunis, Tunisia	9th (h)	100 m	12.60
1999	African Junior Championships	Tunis, Tunisia	7th	200 m	25.22 (w)
2000	World Junior Championships	Santiago, Chile	27th (h)	100 m	12.24 (wind: +1.1 m/s)
2000	World Junior Championships	Santiago, Chile	20th (qf)	200 m	24.71 (wind: -1.4 m/s)
2001	World Championships	Edmonton, Canada	11th (h)	4 × 400 m relay	3:30.03
2002	African Championships	Radès, Tunisia	12th (h)	400 m	56.10
2002	African Championships	Radès, Tunisia	–	4 × 100 m relay	DQ
2003	World Championships	Paris, France	28th (h)	400 m	52.35
2003	World Championships	Paris, France	8th	4 × 400 m relay	DQ
2003	All-Africa Games	Abuja, Nigeria	1st	400 m	51.38
2003	All-Africa Games	Abuja, Nigeria	1st	4 × 100 m relay	45.42
2004	African Championships	Brazzaville, Republic of the Congo	1st	400 m	50.62
2004	African Championships	Brazzaville, Republic of the Congo	1st	4 × 400 m relay	3:29.41
2004	Olympic Games	Athens, Greece	12th (sf)	400 m	51.21
2004	Olympic Games	Athens, Greece	16th (h)	4 × 400 m relay	3:35.18
2005	Universiade	İzmir, Turkey	2nd	400 m	51.33
2005	World Championships	Helsinki, Finland	20th (sf)	400 m	52.35
2005	World Championships	Helsinki, Finland	9th (h)	4 × 400 m relay	3:29.03
2005	Jeux de la Francophonie	Niamey, Niger	2nd	400 m	52.57
2007	All-Africa Games	Algiers, Algeria	10th (sf)	400 m	53.03
2007	All-Africa Games	Algiers, Algeria	5th	4 × 100 m	45.26
2007	All-Africa Games	Algiers, Algeria	4th	4 × 400 m	3:34.88
2008	African Championships	Addis Ababa, Ethiopia	11th (h)	400 m	54.83
2009	Universiade	Belgrade, Serbia	1st	400 m	51.65
2009	Universiade	Belgrade, Serbia	3rd	4 × 400 m relay	3:36.33
2009	World Championships	Berlin, Germany	30th (h)	400 m	54.46
2009	Jeux de la Francophonie	Beirut, Lebanon	2nd	400 m	52.90
2009	Jeux de la Francophonie	Beirut, Lebanon	2nd	4 × 400 m relay	3:36.27
