= 2004 African Championships in Athletics – Women's 400 metres hurdles =

Coordinates: 4°16′24.7″S 15°14′56.9″E

The women's 400 metres hurdles event at the 2004 African Championships in Athletics was held in Brazzaville, Republic of the Congo on July 15–16.

== Medalists ==
Gold	Silver	Bronze
Surita Febbraio; South Africa	Mame Tacko Diouf; Senegal	Zahra Lachgar; Morocco

== Results ==
=== Heats ===
Rank	Heat	Name	Nationality	Time	Notes
1	1	Surita Febbraio	South Africa	57.87	Q
2	1	Zahra Lachgar	Morocco	57.96	Q
3	1	Aïssata Soulama	Burkina Faso	59.10	Q
4	1	Salhate Djamaldine	Comoros	59.18	
1	2	Mame Tacko Diouf	Senegal	56.64	Q
2	2	Omolade Akinremi	Nigeria	57.54	Q
3	2	Carole Kaboud Mebam	Cameroon	57.94	q
4	2	Hanane Skhyi	Morocco	58.72	q
	2	Awatef Ben Hassine	Tunisia	DQ	Doping

=== Final ===
Rank	Name	Nationality	Time	Notes
1st place, gold medalist(s)	Surita Febbraio	South Africa	55.12	
2nd place, silver medalist(s)	Mame Tacko Diouf	Senegal	55.62	
3rd place, bronze medalist(s)	Zahra Lachgar	Morocco	57.12	
4	Hanane Skhyi	Morocco	58.30	
5	Carole Kaboud Mebam	Cameroon	58.38	
6	Aïssata Soulama	Burkina Faso	58.97	
7	Omolade Akinremi	Nigeria	59.08	
	Awatef Ben Hassine	Tunisia	DQ	Doping
