= Mame Tacko Diouf =

Senegalese hurdler (born 1976)

Medal record

Women's athletics

Representing Senegal

African Championships
Gold medal – first place	2000 Algiers	400 m hurdles
Gold medal – first place	2004 Brazzaville	4×400 m
Silver medal – second place	1998 Dakar	100 m hurdles
Silver medal – second place	1998 Dakar	400 m hurdles
Silver medal – second place	1998 Dakar	4×400 m
Silver medal – second place	2000 Algiers	4×100 m
Silver medal – second place	2004 Brazzaville	400 m hurdles
Bronze medal – third place	1996 Yaoundé	100 m hurdles
Bronze medal – third place	2002 Radès	400 m hurdles

Mame Tacko Diouf (born 17 October 1976) is a retired Senegalese hurdler.

== Competition record ==
Year	Competition	Venue	Position	Event	Notes
Representing Senegal
1994	Jeux de la Francophonie	Bondoufle, France	16th (h)	100 m H	14.46
1994	World Junior Championships	Lisbon, Portugal	29th (h)	400 m	59.02
1996	African Championships	Yaoundé, Cameroon	3rd	100 m H	14.21
1997	Jeux de la Francophonie	Antananarivo, Madagascar	3rd	100 m H	13.68
1997	Jeux de la Francophonie	Antananarivo, Madagascar	3rd	400 m H	57.33
1998	African Championships	Dakar, Senegal	2nd	100 m H	13.08
1998	African Championships	Dakar, Senegal	2nd	400 m H	55.06
1999	World Championships	Seville, Spain	10th (h)	400 m H	55.17
1999	World Championships	Seville, Spain	10th (h)	4 × 400 m	3:30.99
1999	All-Africa Games	Johannesburg, South Africa	3rd	100 m H	13.02
1999	All-Africa Games	Johannesburg, South Africa	2nd	400 m H	55.69
2000	African Championships	Algiers, Algeria	1st	400 m H	57.48
2000	African Championships	Algiers, Algeria	2nd	4 × 100 m	44.62
2000	Olympic Games	Sydney, Australia	27th (h)	400 m H	58.65
2000	Olympic Games	Sydney, Australia	13th (h)	4 × 400 m	3:28.02
2001	Jeux de la Francophonie	Ottawa, Canada	5th	400 m H	56.95
2001	World Championships	Edmonton, Canada	17th (h)	400 m H	56.44
2001	World Championships	Edmonton, Canada	11th (h)	4 × 400 m	3:30.03
2002	African Championships	Radès, Tunisia	4th (h)	100 m H	13.88
2002	African Championships	Radès, Tunisia	3rd	400 m H	58.86
2003	World Championships	Paris, France	19th (h)	400 m H	56.22
2003	World Championships	Paris, France	7th (h)	4 × 400 m	3:28.37
2004	African Championships	Brazzaville, Republic of the Congo	2nd	400 m H	55.62
2004	African Championships	Brazzaville, Republic of the Congo	1st	4 × 400 m	3:29.41
2004	Olympic Games	Athens, Greece	29th (h)	400 m H	57.25
2004	Olympic Games	Athens, Greece	16th (h)	4 × 400 m	3:35.18

=== Personal bests ===
- 100 metres hurdles - 12.94 s (2000)
- 400 metres hurdles - 54.75 s (1999)
- 200 metres - 23.43 s (2000)
- 400 metres - 53.96 s (2003)

Olympic Games
Preceded by Ibou Faye	Flagbearer for Senegal; 2000 Sydney	Succeeded by Malick Fall
