= 2000 World Junior Championships in Athletics – Men's 10,000 metres =

The men's 10,000 metres event at the 2000 World Junior Championships in Athletics was held in Santiago, Chile, at Estadio Nacional Julio Martínez Prádanos on 17 October.

== Medalists ==
Gold	Robert Kipchumba; Kenya
Silver	Duncan Lebo; Kenya
Bronze	Abraha Hadush; Ethiopia

== Results ==
=== Final ===
17 October

Rank	Name	Nationality	Time	Notes
1st place, gold medalist(s)	Robert Kipchumba	Kenya	28:54.37	
2nd place, silver medalist(s)	Duncan Lebo	Kenya	28:58.39	
3rd place, bronze medalist(s)	Abraha Hadush	Ethiopia	29:44.65	
4	Kebede Tekeste	Ethiopia	29:44.69	
5	Jeffrey Gwebu	South Africa	30:01.62	
6	Jean Baptiste Simukeka	Rwanda	30:08.87	
7	Zhang Yunshan	China	30:24.02	
8	Vasyl Matviychuk	Ukraine	30:41.23	
9	Jumah Al-Noor	Qatar	30:49.36	
10	Jorge Cabrera	Paraguay	31:34.86	
11	Jonathan Monje	Chile	31:44.60	
12	Ingemund Askeland	Norway	32:19.07	
13	Foaad Abubaker	Qatar	32:34.19	
14	David Solís	Spain	33:02.05	
	Ioánnis Kanellópoulos	Greece	DNF	
	Joep Tigchelaar	Netherlands	DNF	

== Participation ==
According to an unofficial count, 16 athletes from 13 countries participated in the event.

- Chile (1)
- China (1)
- Ethiopia (2)
- Greece (1)
- Kenya (2)
- Netherlands (1)
- Norway (1)
- Paraguay (1)
- Qatar (2)
- Rwanda (1)
- South Africa (1)
- Spain (1)
- Ukraine (1)
