= Younès Moudrik =

Moroccan long jumper

Medal record

Men's athletics

Representing Morocco

African Championships
Gold medal – first place	2000 Algiers	Long jump
Gold medal – first place	2002 Radès	Long jump
Bronze medal – third place	2006 Bambous	Triple jump

Younès Moudrik (Arabic: يونس مدرك, born 1 October 1977) is a retired Moroccan long jumper.

== Early career ==
He was born in Rabat. At the 1994 African Junior Championships he won the bronze medal in the long jump and the gold medal in the high jump. His lifetime best in the latter event remained 2.12 metres, achieved in Algiers in July 1994. He finished eighth at the 1996 World Junior Championships, and also competed at the 1994 World Junior Championships, the 1997 World Indoor Championships and the 1997 World Championships without reaching the final. His personal best evolved from 7.55 metres in 1994 to 7.76 in 1995 and 7.80 in 1996, both achieved in Meknes. In 1997 he broke the 8-metre barrier when he jumped 8.11 metres in Beirut. This earned him the gold medal at the 1997 Pan Arab Games. He became Moroccan champion in 1994 and 1997, facing competition from Mustapha Benmrah, Hassan Ghazala, Mehdi El Ghazouani and Yahya Berrabah.

== International breakthrough ==
In 1998 he fell slightly back to 8.10 metres, achieved in May in Seville, and did not compete in a major championship. In 1999 he returned to Seville to finish eighth at the 1999 World Championships. He finished fourth at the 1999 Grand Prix Final. He set a new personal best with 8.20 metres in August in Monaco. In 2000 he won the African Championships. His jump of 8.34 metres was a new championship record, and is also his lifetime best. He also competed at the 2000 Olympic Games without reaching the final.

In 2001 and 2002 he jumped 8.02 metres indoor three times, two of them in Erfurt. This is the current Moroccan indoor record. He finished eighth at the 2001 World Indoor Championships, won the 2001 Grand Prix Final and a silver medal at the 2001 Mediterranean Games. In 2002 he won the African Championships and finished fifth at the 2002 World Cup.

His results declined thereafter. His season's bests were 8.23 in 2001, achieved in September in Melbourne, 8.11 in 2002, achieved in June in Chania, 8.05 in 2003, achieved in August in Casablanca, 7.85 in 2004, achieved in May in Casablanca, and only 7.45 in 2005, achieved in April in Fort-de-France. In 2006 he managed to jump 7.75 metres in May in Abuja. At the 2006 African Championships in August he finished seventh in the long jump and won a bronze medal in the triple jump, both with wind-aided marks. His personal best triple jump is 16.80 metres, achieved in May 2005 in Marrakesh.
