= 2000 African Championships in Athletics =

2000 African Championships
- Dates: 12–15 July
- Host city: Algiers, Algeria
- Venue: Stade 5 Juillet 1962
- Events: 43
- Participation: 411 athletes from 43 nations

The 12th African Championships in Athletics were held in Algiers, Algeria between 12 and 15 July 2000 at the Stade 5 Juillet 1962.

== Men's results ==
Event	Gold		Silver		Bronze	
100 m (wind: -0.9 m/s)	Abdul Aziz Zakari; Ghana	10.13	Stéphan Buckland; Mauritius	10.20	Kenneth Andam; Ghana	10.33
200 m (wind: +0.2 m/s)	Abdul Aziz Zakari; Ghana	20.23	Joseph Batangdon; Cameroon	20.31 =NR	Oumar Loum; Senegal	20.76
400 m	Eric Milazar; Mauritius	45.62	Malik Louahla; Algeria	45.78	Sofiène Labidi; Tunisia	45.81
800 m	Djabir Saïd-Guerni; Algeria	1:45.88	Mbulaeni Mulaudzi; South Africa	1:46.28	Mouhssin Chehibi; Morocco	1:46.47
1500 m	Youssef Baba; Morocco	3:42.07	Adil Kaouch; Morocco	3:42.53	Mohamed Khaldi; Algeria	3:42.77
5000 m	Ali Saïdi Sief; Algeria	13:26.86	Saïd Bérioui; Morocco	13:31.75	Mohamed Saïd El Wardi; Morocco	13:30.01 (???)
10,000 m	Abraha Hadush; Ethiopia	28:40.51	Dejene Berhanu; Ethiopia	28:41.11	Kamel Kohil; Algeria	28:48.98
3000 m St.	Lotfi Turki; Tunisia	8:33.29	Laïd Bessou; Algeria	8:35.89	David Chepkisa; Kenya	8:39.00
110 m H (wind: -0.3 m/s)	Joseph-Berlioz Randriamihaja; Madagascar	13.99	Doudou Félou Sow; Senegal	14.38	Toufik Dahmani; Algeria	15.10
400 m H	Sylvester Omodiale; Nigeria	49.81	Jean-Dominique Dième; Senegal	50.29	Yvon Rakotoarimiandry; Madagascar	50.39
4 X 100 m	Ghana; Abu Duah; Kenneth Andam; Harry Adu Mfum; Abdul Aziz Zakari	39.90	Mauritius; Arnaud Casquette; Eric Milazar; Fernando Augustin; Stephane Buckland	40.07	Gabon; Lueyi Dovy; Charles Tayot; Yvan Duboze; Antoine Boussombo	40.53
4 X 400 m	Algeria; Malik Louahla; Samir Louahla; Adem Hecini; Djabir Saïd-Guerni	3:05.45	Botswana; Lulu Basinyi; Otukile Lekote; Agripa Matsameko; Johnson Kubisa	3:06.07	Senegal; Youssoupha Sarr; Hachim Ndiaye; Jean-Dominique Dieme; Ousmane Niang	3:06.53
20 km Walk	Hatem Ghoula; Tunisia	1:25:38 CR	Moussa Aouanouk; Algeria	1:25:42	Merzak Abbès; Algeria	1:32:37
WR world record | AR area record | CR championship record | GR games record | NR national record | OR Olympic record | PB personal best | SB season best | WL world leading (in a given season)

=== Field ===
Event	Gold		Silver		Bronze	
High jump	Abderrahmane Hammad; Algeria	2.34 CR	Malcolm Hendriks; South Africa	2.20	Eugène Ernesta; Seychelles	2.20 NR
Long jump	Younès Moudrik; Morocco	8.34	Hatem Mersal; Egypt	7.90	Mehdi El Ghazouani; Morocco	7.88
Pole vault	Rafik Mefti; Algeria	5.00	Karim Sène; Senegal	4.80	Mohamed Benyahia; Algeria	4.65
Triple jump	Andrew Owusu; Ghana	16.69	Samuel Okantey; Ghana	16.69	Olivier Sanou; Burkina Faso	16.31
Shot put	Chima Ugwu; Nigeria	19.02	John Sullivan; South Africa	17.46	Hicham Aïtaha; Morocco	16.91
Discus	Frits Potgieter; South Africa	60.35	Mickael Conjungo; Central African Republic	59.58	Chima Ugwu; Nigeria	57.91
Javelin	Maher Ridane; Tunisia	72.51	Khaled Es Sayed Yassin; Egypt	72.01	Walid Abderrazak Mohamed; Egypt	71.67
Hammer	Samir Haouam; Algeria	69.38	Mohamed Karim Horchani; Tunisia	63.68	Yamen Hussein Abdel Moneim; Egypt	63.71
Decathlon	Rédouane Youcef; Algeria	7129 points	Mada Ndiaye; Senegal	6981 points	Adil Chakri; Morocco	6715 points
WR world record | AR area record | CR championship record | GR games record | NR national record | OR Olympic record | PB personal best | SB season best | WL world leading (in a given season)

== Women's results ==
=== Track ===
Event	Gold		Silver		Bronze	
100 m (wind: -0.6 m/s)	Myriam Léonie Mani; Cameroon	11.21	Aïda Diop; Senegal	11.46	Monica Twum; Ghana	11.47
200 m (wind: +0.4 m/s)	Myriam Léonie Mani; Cameroon	22.54	Aïda Diop; Senegal	23.01	Fatima Yusuf; Nigeria	23.27
400 m	Claudine Komgang; Cameroon	51.35	Mireille Nguimgo; Cameroon	51.81	Nadjina Kaltouma; Chad	52.27
800 m	Hasna Benhassi; Morocco	1:59.01	Nouria Mérah-Benida; Algeria	1:59.73	Gladys Wamuyu; Kenya	2:00.32
1500 m	Nouria Mérah-Benida; Algeria	4:16.14	Gladys Wamuyu; Kenya	4:16.56	Berhane Herpassa; Ethiopia	4:16.87
5000 m	Asmae Leghzaoui; Morocco	15:43.46	Meseret Defar; Ethiopia	15:49.86	Merima Denboba; Ethiopia	15:53.68
10,000 m	Souad Aït Salem; Algeria	34:02.28	Genet Teka; Ethiopia	34:05.18	Bouchra Chaabi; Morocco	34:08.79
100 m H (wind: +0.1 m/s)	Glory Alozie; Nigeria	13.09	Lalanirina Rosa Rakotozafy; Madagascar	13.21	Maria-Joëlle Conjungo; Central African Republic	13.77
400 m H	Mame Tacko Diouf; Senegal	57.48	Gnima Touré; Senegal	58.96	Nabila Jami; Morocco	62.45
4 X 100 m	Ghana; Helen Amoako; Monica Twum; Veronica Bawuah; Vida Anim	43.99	Senegal; Bintou Ndiaye; Aminata Diouf; Mame Tacko Diouf; Aida Diop	44.62	Cameroon; Françoise Mbango Etone; Claudine Komgang; Hortense Bewouda; Mireille Nguimgo	46.97
4 X 400 m	Cameroon; Mireille Nguimgo; Hortense Bewouda; Claudine Komgang; Myriam Leonie Mani	3:32.89	Morocco; Bouchra Zboured; Samira Raif; Hasna Benhassi; Soumaya Laabani	3:42.91	Algeria; Amel Baraket; Hadjira Sifouani; Nahida Touhami; Khadija Touati	3:51.01
10 km Walk	Bahia Boussad; Algeria	49:33	Nagwa Ibrahim Ali; Egypt	50:15	Dounia Kara; Algeria	50:55
WR world record | AR area record | CR championship record | GR games record | NR national record | OR Olympic record | PB personal best | SB season best | WL world leading (in a given season)

=== Field ===
Event	Gold		Silver		Bronze	
High jump	Hind Bounouar; Morocco	1.75	Amina Lemgherbi; Algeria	1.70	Hamida Benhocine; Algeria	1.70
Pole vault	Syrine Balti; Tunisia	3.85	Annelie van Wyk; South Africa	3.80	Rasha Abdel Khalek; Egypt	3.10
Long jump	Kéné Ndoye; Senegal	6.39	Elisa Cossa; Mozambique	6.20	Béryl Laramé; Seychelles	6.18
Triple jump	Baya Rahouli; Algeria	14.23	Françoise Mbango Etone; Cameroon	13.87	Kéné Ndoye; Senegal	13.81
Shot put	Hanaa Salah El Melegi; Egypt	16.01	Amel Ben Khaled; Tunisia	15.39	Wafa Ismail El Baghdadi; Egypt	14.97
Discus	Monia Kari; Tunisia	58.46	Ndoumbé Gaye; Senegal	50.81	Felicia Nkiru Ojiego; Nigeria	49.65
Hammer	Caroline Fournier; Mauritius	59.60	Marwa Hussein; Egypt	57.15	Djida Yalloulène; Algeria	49.72
Javelin	Aïda Sellam; Tunisia	53.35	Lindy Leveaux; Seychelles	50.88	Hanaa Salah El Melegi; Egypt	42.31
Heptathlon	Yasmina Kettab; Algeria	5837 points	Maralize Fouché; South Africa	5726 points	Patience Itanyi; Nigeria	5611 points
WR world record | AR area record | CR championship record | GR games record | NR national record | OR Olympic record | PB personal best | SB season best | WL world leading (in a given season)

== Medal table ==
Rank	Nation	Gold	Silver	Bronze	Total
1	Algeria (ALG)	12	5	9	26
2	Tunisia (TUN)	6	2	1	9
3	Morocco (MAR)	5	3	7	15
4	Ghana (GHA)	5	1	2	8
5	Cameroon (CMR)	4	3	1	8
6	Nigeria (NGR)	3	0	4	7
7	Senegal (SEN)	2	9	3	14
8	Mauritius (MRI)	2	2	0	4
9	South Africa (RSA)	1	5	0	6
10	Egypt (EGY)	1	4	5	10
11	Ethiopia (ETH)	1	3	2	6
12	Madagascar (MAD)	1	1	1	3
13	Kenya (KEN)	0	1	2	3
13	Seychelles (SEY)	0	1	2	3
15	Central African Republic (CAF)	0	1	1	2
16	Botswana (BOT)	0	1	0	1
16	Mozambique (MOZ)	0	1	0	1
18	Burkina Faso (BFA)	0	0	1	1
18	Chad (CHA)	0	0	1	1
18	Gabon (GAB)	0	0	1	1
Totals (20 entries)		43	43	43	129

== See also ==
- 2000 in athletics (track and field)
