= 1998 African Championships in Athletics =

1998 African Championships
- Host stadium in Dakar
- Dates: 18–22 August
- Host city: Dakar, Senegal
- Venue: Stade Léopold Senghor
- Events: 42
- Participation: 395 athletes from 39 nations

The 11th African Championships in Athletics were held in Dakar, Senegal, from August 18 to August 22 at the Stade Léopold Senghor.

== Men's results ==
=== Track ===
Event	Gold		Silver		Bronze	
100 m (wind: +0.1 m/s)	Seun Ogunkoya; Nigeria	9.94 CR	Frankie Fredericks; Namibia	9.97	Leonard Myles-Mills; Ghana	10.10
200 m (wind: +0.6 m/s)	Frankie Fredericks; Namibia	19.99 CR	Sunday Emmanuel; Nigeria	20.45	Oumar Loum; Senegal	20.59
400 m	Clement Chukwu; Nigeria	44.65 CR	Davis Kamoga; Uganda	44.79	Ibrahima Wade; Senegal	45.05
800 m	Japheth Kimutai; Kenya	1:45.82	Patrick Ndururi; Kenya	1:45.85	Djabir Saïd-Guerni; Algeria	1:46.31
1500 m	Laban Rotich; Kenya	3:45.03	Adil Kaouch; Morocco	3:47.34	Ali Saïdi Sief; Algeria	3:47.89
3000 m	Tom Nyariki; Kenya	8:03.75	Brahim Lahlafi; Morocco	8:05.00	Fita Bayissa; Ethiopia	8:05.16
5000 m	Daniel Komen; Kenya	13:35.70	Hailu Mekonnen; Ethiopia	13:38.19	William Kalya; Kenya	13:39.17
3000 m st.	Bernard Barmasai; Kenya	8:11.74 CR	Richard Limo; Kenya	8:20.67	Brahim Boulami; Morocco	8:29.52
110 m H (wind: +0.5 m/s)	Shaun Bownes; South Africa	13.72	William Erese; Nigeria	13.92	Doudou Félou Sow; Senegal	14.57
400 m H	Samuel Matete; Zambia	48.58	Ken Harnden; Zimbabwe	49.39	Ibou Faye; Senegal	49.59
4 x 100 m	Ivory Coast; Eric Pacome N'Dri; Jean-Olivier Zirignon; Ahmed Douhou; Ibrahim Meité	38.76	Nigeria; Ejiogou Okechukwu; Tunde Suleiman; Paul Egonye; Sunday Emmanuel	38.88	Cameroon; Benjamin Sirimou; Claude Toukene-Guebogo; Serge Bengono; Alexandre Dalle Dalle	39.61
4 x 400 m	Senegal; Ousmane Niang; Ibou Faye; Hachim Ndiaye; Ibrahima Wade	3:04.20	Zimbabwe; Ken Harnden; Crispen Mutakanyi; Phillip Mukomana; Jeffrey Masvanhise	3:04.47	Nigeria; Tony Ogbeta; Musa Audu; Fidelis Gadzama; Nduka Awazie	3:05.18
20 km Walk	Hatem Ghoula; Tunisia	1:31:28	Moussa Aouanouk; Algeria	1:32:18	Getachew Demisse; Ethiopia	1:34:19
WR world record | AR area record | CR championship record | GR games record | NR national record | OR Olympic record | PB personal best | SB season best | WL world leading (in a given season)

=== Field ===
Event	Gold		Silver		Bronze	
High jump	Abderrahmane Hammad; Algeria	2.21	Khemraj Naiko; Mauritius	2.18	Gavin Lendis; South Africa	2.15
Long jump	Hatem Mersal; Egypt	8.13	Anis Gallali; Tunisia	8.01	Mark Anthony Awere; Ghana	7.77
Pole vault	Okkert Brits; South Africa	5.40 =CR	Kersley Gardenne; Mauritius	5.20	Mohamed Bédoui; Tunisia	4.80
Triple jump	Andrew Owusu; Ghana	17.23 CR	Ndabazinhle Mdhlongwa; Zimbabwe	17.19	Oluyemi Sule; Nigeria	16.37
Shot put	Burger Lambrechts; South Africa	19.78	Dhia Kamel Ahmed; Egypt	17.61	Quentin Soné Ehawa; Cameroon	15.51
Discus	Frantz Kruger; South Africa	62.17	Frits Potgieter; South Africa	60.50	Mickael Conjungo; Central African Republic	57.52
Javelin	Marius Corbett; South Africa	79.82	Khaled Es Sayed Yassin; Egypt	72.84	Bouna Diop; Senegal	72.66
Hammer	Chris Harmse; South Africa	72.11 CR	Hakim Toumi; Algeria	69.36	Samir Haouam; Algeria	68.79
Decathlon	Rédouane Youcef; Algeria	7352 points	Mohamed Benyahia; Algeria	7093 points	Issam Abdelatif Saber; Egypt	6420 points
WR world record | AR area record | CR championship record | GR games record | NR national record | OR Olympic record | PB personal best | SB season best | WL world leading (in a given season)

== Women results ==
=== Track ===
Event	Gold		Silver		Bronze	
100 m (wind: -1.1 m/s)	Mary Onyali; Nigeria	11.05 CR	Endurance Ojokolo; Nigeria	11.08	Rose Aboaje; Nigeria	11.31
200 m (wind: -1.1 m/s)	Falilat Ogunkoya; Nigeria	22.22 CR	Rose Aboaje; Nigeria	22.83	Heide Seyerling; South Africa	22.89
400 m	Falilat Ogunkoya; Nigeria	50.07 CR	Charity Opara; Nigeria	50.13	Ony Paule Ratsimbazafy; Madagascar	52.11
800 m	Maria de Lurdes Mutola; Mozambique	1:57.95	Hasna Benhassi; Morocco	2:01.24	Julia Sakara; Zimbabwe	2:01.55
1500 m	Jackline Maranga; Kenya	4:11.75 CR	Julia Sakara; Zimbabwe	4:13.64	Bouchra Benthami; Morocco	4:17.83
3000 m	Zahra Ouaziz; Morocco	8:53.75	Genet Gebregiorgis; Ethiopia	9:13.47	Yemenashu Taye; Ethiopia	9:13.59
5000 m	Berhane Adere; Ethiopia	15:54.31 CR	Sally Barsosio; Kenya	15:59.12	Merima Denboba; Ethiopia	16:11.16
100 m H (wind: -0.1 m/s)	Glory Alozie; Nigeria	12.77 CR	Mame Tacko Diouf; Senegal	13.08	Corien Botha; South Africa	13.25
400 m H	Nezha Bidouane; Morocco	54.24 CR	Mame Tacko Diouf; Senegal	55.06	Saidat Onanuga; Nigeria	56.84
4 x 100 m	Nigeria; Endurance Ojokolo; Henrietta Ajaegbu; Funmilola Ogundana; Rose Aboaja	43.75	Madagascar; Hanitriniaina Rakotrondrabe; Lalao Ravaonirina; Paule Ony Ratsimbazafy; Rosa Rakotozafy	43.78	Ghana; Veronica Bawuah; Vida Nsiah; Monica Twum; Mavis Akoto	43.89
4 x 400 m	Nigeria; Folashade Ogundemi; Rosemary Okafor; Doris Jacob; Falilat Ogunkoya	3:31.07 CR	Senegal; Mame Tacko Diouf; Amy Mbacke Thiam; Aminata Diouf; Gnima Touré	3:31.07	Cameroon; Myriam Leonie Mani; Sylvie Mballa Eloundou; Mireille Nguimgo; Claudine Komgang	3:33.85
5000 m walk	Nagwa Ibrahim Ali; Egypt	24:28.42	Dounia Kara; Algeria	25:17.17	Anne-Hortense Ebéna; Cameroon	25:33.11
WR world record | AR area record | CR championship record | GR games record | NR national record | OR Olympic record | PB personal best | SB season best | WL world leading (in a given season)

=== Field ===
Event	Gold		Silver		Bronze	
High jump	Hestrie Storbeck; South Africa	1.92	Irène Tiendrébéogo; Burkina Faso	1.84	Nkechinyere Mbaoma; Nigeria	1.75
Long jump	Chioma Ajunwa; Nigeria	6.78 =CR	Chinedu Odozor; Nigeria	6.45	Baya Rahouli; Algeria	6.36
Triple jump	Baya Rahouli; Algeria	13.96 CR	Françoise Mbango Etone; Cameroon	13.80	Kéné Ndoye; Senegal	13.30
Shot put	Veronica Abrahamse; South Africa	15.07	Amel Ben Khaled; Tunisia	14.83	Hanan Ahmed Khaled; Egypt	14.68
Discus	Elizna Naudé; South Africa	50.28	Caroline Fournier; Mauritius	50.28	Hanan Ahmed Khaled; Egypt	42.82
Hammer	Caroline Fournier; Mauritius	54.29	Marwa Ahmed Hussein; Egypt	47.55	Djida Yalloulène; Algeria	47.43
Javelin (old type)	Lindy Leveaux; Seychelles	47.56	Bernadette Ravina; Mauritius	46.79	Monique Djikada; Cameroon	45.61
Heptathlon	Patience Itanyi; Nigeria	5376 points	Mary Dolly Zé Oyono; Cameroon	5211 points	Paulette Mendy; Senegal	4716 points
WR world record | AR area record | CR championship record | GR games record | NR national record | OR Olympic record | PB personal best | SB season best | WL world leading (in a given season)

== Medal table ==
Rank	Nation	Gold	Silver	Bronze	Total
1	Nigeria (NGR)	10	7	5	22
2	South Africa (RSA)	9	1	3	13
3	Kenya (KEN)	6	3	1	10
4	Algeria (ALG)	3	4	5	12
5	Egypt (EGY)	2	3	3	8
6	Morocco (MAR)	2	3	2	7
7	Mauritius (MRI)	1	4	0	5
8	Senegal (SEN)	1	3	7	11
9	Ethiopia (ETH)	1	2	4	7
10	Tunisia (TUN)	1	2	1	4
11	Namibia (NAM)	1	1	0	2
12	Ghana (GHA)	1	0	3	4
13	Ivory Coast (CIV)	1	0	0	1
13	Mozambique (MOZ)	1	0	0	1
13	Seychelles (SEY)	1	0	0	1
13	Zambia (ZAM)	1	0	0	1
17	Zimbabwe (ZIM)	0	4	1	5
18	Cameroon (CMR)	0	2	5	7
19	Madagascar (MAD)	0	1	1	2
20	Burkina Faso (BFA)	0	1	0	1
20	Uganda (UGA)	0	1	0	1
22	Central African Republic (CAF)	0	0	1	1
Totals (22 entries)		42	42	42	126

== See also ==
- 1998 in athletics (track and field)
