= Oluyemi Fagbamila =

Nigerian sprinter (born 1983)

Medal record

Women's athletics

Representing Nigeria

African Championships
Silver medal – second place	2002 Radès	4×400 m

Oluyemi Fagbamila (born 23 February 1983) is a retired Nigerian sprinter who specialized in the 400 metres.

With Nigerian 4 × 400 metres relay teams she won a silver medal at the 2002 African Championships and was selected for the 2003 World Championships, but the team ended up not starting the race.

Individually she finished eighth at the 2002 World Junior Championships. She previously competed at the 1999 World Youth Championships (100 and 200 m) without reaching the final.

Her personal best times were 23.46 seconds in the 200 metres, achieved in May 2002 in El Paso; and 52.19 seconds in the 400 metres, achieved in May 2002 in Houston. She competed collegiately for the University of Texas at El Paso.
