= Nahida Touhami =

Algerian middle-distance runner

Medal record

Women's athletics

Representing Algeria

African Championships
Bronze medal – third place	2000 Algiers	4×400 m
Bronze medal – third place	2002 Radès	4×400 m

Nahida Mahour Bacha Touhami (born 10 February 1978) is an Algerian middle-distance runner who specializes in the women's 800 and 1500 metres.

== Achievements ==
Year	Competition	Venue	Position	Event	Notes
Representing Algeria
1999	All-Africa Games	Johannesburg, South Africa	10th (h)	800 m	2:08.83
2000	African Championships	Algiers, Algeria	3rd	4 × 400 m relay	3:51.01
2001	Mediterranean Games	Radès, Tunisia	10th (h)	800 m	2:06.90
2001	Mediterranean Games	Radès, Tunisia	5th	1500 m	4:15.26
2002	African Championships	Radès, Tunisia	6th	800 m	2:07.01
2002	African Championships	Radès, Tunisia	9th	1500 m	4:25.50
2002	African Championships	Radès, Tunisia	3rd	4 × 400 m relay	4:25.50
2003	All-Africa Games	Abuja, Nigeria	8th	800 m	2:06.32
2004	Olympic Games	Athens, Greece	1500 m	12th (sf)	4:07.21
2004	Pan Arab Games	Algiers, Algeria	1st	800 m	2:34.48
2004	Pan Arab Games	Algiers, Algeria	1st	1500 m	4:35.85
2006	World Indoor Championships	Moscow, Russia	9th	1500 m	4:12.09 (iPB)
2006	African Championships	Bambous, Mauritius	5th	800 m	2:05.33
2006	African Championships	Bambous, Mauritius	6th	1500 m	4:25.25
2007	All-Africa Games	Algiers, Algeria	3rd	800 m	2:03.79
2007	All-Africa Games	Algiers, Algeria	5th	1500 m	4:12.34
2007	World Championships	Osaka, Japan	25th (h)	1500 m	4:14.38
2008	Olympic Games	Beijing, China	30th (h)	1500 m	4:18.99

=== Personal bests ===
- 200 metres – 24.85 s (1996)
- 400 metres – 53.08 s (2003)
- 800 metres – 1:59.65 min (2004)
- 1500 metres – 4:05.25 min (2004)
