= Hestrie Cloete =

South African high jumper

Personal information
- Nationality: RSA
- Born: 26 August 1978 (age 47) Germiston, South Africa
- Height: 1.85 m (6 ft 1 in)
- Weight: 68 kg (150 lb)

Sport
- Sport: Track and field
- Event: High jump

Achievements and titles
- Personal best: HJ: 2.06 (Saint-Denis 2003)
Medal record
Women's Athletics
Representing South Africa
Olympic Games
| Silver medal – second place | 2004 Athens | High jump |
| Silver medal – second place | 2000 Sydney | High jump |
World Championships
| Gold medal – first place | 2003 Paris | High jump |
| Gold medal – first place | 2001 Edmonton | High jump |
Commonwealth Games
| Gold medal – first place | 1998 Kuala Lumpur | High jump |
| Gold medal – first place | 2002 Manchester | High jump |
All-Africa Games
| Gold medal – first place | 1995 Harare | High jump |
| Gold medal – first place | 1999 Johannesburg | High jump |
African Championships
| Gold medal – first place | 1998 Dakar | High jump |
| Gold medal – first place | 2002 Tunis | High jump |
| Gold medal – first place | 2004 Brazzaville | High jump |
- Updated on 14 November 2013

Hestrie Cloete OIS (née Storbeck; born 26 August 1978) is a former South African professional high jumper. Her foremost achievements were winning two world championships and two silver medals at the Olympic Games.

== Career ==
Cloete was discovered at an age of 13 by her long-time coach Martin Marx, and trained at the Lichtenburg High School early in her career. She was quickly found to have a very strong will, which had given other coaches trouble coaching her. Hestrie Cloete had always put a great significance in maintaining a strong mind, and explained that she finds much of that strength in her faith. In 2003, she was awarded the Order of Ikhamanga in Silver (OIS) by South African president Thabo Mbeki for excellence in her sports performances.

Cloete had somewhat unusual habits, as she was known to smoke about a pack of cigarettes a day, and has also stated she loved fast food. In an attempt to focus before every jump, Cloete characteristically did spin her index fingers around each other, leaned sideways with her upper body and visualised every step of her attempt.

Cloete retired after the 2004 Summer Olympics to focus on her family.

== International competitions ==
Cloete was awarded numerous international achievements. She achieved her high jump personal best of 2.06 m on 31 August 2003, when winning the gold medal under the World Championships in Paris (African record, as of July 2024).

| Year | Competition | Venue | Position | Notes |
Representing South Africa
| 1995 | All-Africa Games | Harare, Zimbabwe | 1st | 1.85 m |
| 1996 | World Junior Championships | Sydney | 6th | 1.85 m |
| 1998 | IAAF World Cup | Johannesburg, South Africa | 2nd | 1.96 m |
| 1998 | African Championships | Dakar, Senegal | 1st | 1.92 m |
| 1999 | All-Africa Games | Johannesburg, South Africa | 1st | 1.96 m |
| 2000 | Olympic Games | Sydney | 2nd | 2.01 m |
| 2001 | World Championships | Edmonton, Canada | 1st | 2.00 m |
| 2002 | IAAF World Cup | Madrid, Spain | 1st | 2.02 m |
| 2002 | Commonwealth Games | Manchester, England | 1st | 1.96 m |
| 2002 | African Championships | Radès, Tunisia | 1st | 1.95 m |
| 2003 | World Championships | Paris, France | 1st | 2.06 m |
| 2004 | Olympic Games | Athens, Greece | 2nd | 2.02 m |
| 2004 | African Championships | Brazzaville, Republic of the Congo | 1st | 1.95 m |

== Personal life ==
Cloete grew up under her maiden name Storbeck in the small railway town of Coligny with her mother Martie and father Willem. She divorced her first husband in 2004 and married Afrikaans singer Jurie Els on 30 September 2005, gave birth to a daughter Chrizette on 5 October 2006 and moved to New Zealand early in 2008. Hestrie and Jurie's son Jason John Els was born in New Zealand on 23 July 2008. The couple resides in Millwater, Silverdale, Auckland on the North Island and Hestrie is a sport store manager while Jurie owns a small business Retro Records which sells Pop and Rock vinyl records.

== Awards ==
- Order of Ikhamanga (2003) for "exceptional performance in the field of Athletics"

Awards
| Preceded by Paula Radcliffe | Women's Track & Field Athlete of the Year; 2003 | Succeeded by Yelena Isinbayeva |
Sporting positions
| Preceded by Venelina Veneva; Kajsa Bergqvist | Women's High Jump Best Year Performance; 1999; 2003 | Succeeded by Monica Iagăr; Yelena Slesarenko |
