= Zahra Lachguer =

Moroccan track and field athlete

Personal information
- Born: 8 June 1978 (age 48)

Sport
- Sport: Track and field
Medal record
Representing Morocco
Pan Arab Games
Gold medal – first place	1999 Irbid	400 m hurdles
Silver medal – second place	1997 Beirut	400 m hurdles
Silver medal – second place	1997 Beirut	Javelin throw
Bronze medal – third place	2004 Algiers	400 m hurdles
Bronze medal – third place	2004 Algiers	Hepathlon
African Championships
Gold medal – first place	2002 Radès	400 m hurdles
Bronze medal – third place	2004 Brazzaville	400 m hurdles

Zahra Lachguer (born 8 June 1978) is a Moroccan former track and field athlete who specialised in the 400 metres hurdles. She was the gold medallist in the event at the 2002 African Championships in Athletics.

She has won medals across several disciplines at the Pan Arab Games, including three 400 m hurdles medals, a javelin throw medal and a heptathlon medal. She was a 1999 Pan Arab Games gold medallist in the hurdles.

Lachguer represented Africa at the 2002 IAAF World Cup. She also won a bronze medal at the 2004 African Championships in Athletics.

She has won national titles in the 400 metres sprint, 400 m hurdles, javelin and heptathlon.

== International competitions ==
Year	Competition	Venue	Position	Event	Notes
1995	African Junior Championships	Bouaké, Ivory Coast	2nd	400 m hurdles	63.16
1995	African Junior Championships	Bouaké, Ivory Coast	3rd	Javelin throw	38.92
1997	Mediterranean Games	Bari, Italy	6th	400 m hurdles	59.63
1997	Mediterranean Games	Bari, Italy	5th	4 × 400 m relay	3:43.01
1997	Pan Arab Games	Beirut, Lebanon	2nd	400 m hurdles	60.13
1997	Pan Arab Games	Beirut, Lebanon	2nd	Javelin throw	38.76 m
1999	Universiade	Palma de Mallorca, Spain	25th (h)	400 m hurdles	65.17
1999	Pan Arab Games	Irbid, Jordan	1st	400 m hurdles	60.62
2002	African Championships	Radès, Tunisia	1st	400 m hurdles	57.91
2002	World Cup	Madrid, Spain	8th	400 m hurdles	59.14
2003	Universiade	Daegu, South Korea	14th (h)	400 m hurdles	59.01
2004	African Championships	Brazzaville, Congo	3rd	400 m hurdles	57.12
2004	African Championships	Brazzaville, Congo	5th	4 × 400 m relay	3:44.16
2004	Pan Arab Games	Algiers, Algeria	3rd	400 m hurdles	58.20
2004	Pan Arab Games	Algiers, Algeria	3rd	Heptathlon	4965 pts
2005	Mediterranean Games	Almería, Spain	13th (h)	400 m hurdles	58.92
