= Surita Febbraio =

South African hurdler

Medal record

Women's athletics

Representing South Africa

African Championships
Gold medal – first place	2004 Brazzaville	400 m hurdles
Silver medal – second place	2004 Brazzaville	4×400 m

Surita Febbraio (born 27 December 1973) is a South African hurdler.

She won a silver medal at the 1999 All-Africa Games in Johannesburg, finished eighth at the 2003 World Championships in Paris, won the 2004 African Championships in Brazzaville and finished eighth at the 2005 World Athletics Final in Monaco.

Her personal best time is 54.05 seconds, achieved in April 2003 in Pretoria.

In 2006 Febbraio was found guilty of testosterone doping. The sample containing the banned substance was delivered on 13 December 2005 in an out-of-competition test in South Africa. She received an IAAF suspension from March 2006 to March 2008.

== Awards ==
- 2003 – University of Pretoria Sports woman of the year

== See also ==
- List of doping cases in sport
