= Abraha Hadush =

Ethiopian long-distance runner

Medal record

Men's athletics

Representing Ethiopia

African Championships
| Gold medal – first place | 2000 Algiers | 10,000 m |

World Junior Championships
| Bronze medal – third place | 2000 Santiago | 10,000 m |

Abraha Hadush (born 1982) is a former Ethiopian long-distance runner who competed in the 10,000 metres. He won gold in the event at the 2000 African Championships with the time of 28:40.51.
