= Kaltouma Nadjina =

Chadian sprinter (born 1976)

Medal record

Women's athletics

Representing Chad

African Championships
Gold medal – first place	2002 Radès	200 m
Gold medal – first place	2002 Radès	400 m
Silver medal – second place	2004 Brazzaville	400 m
Bronze medal – third place	2000 Algiers	400 m
Bronze medal – third place	2004 Brazzaville	200 m

Kaltouma Nadjina (born November 16, 1976) is a Chadian sprinter. Her specialities are the 200 and 400 metres, and she holds Chadian records in those events, the 100 m, and the 800 m. She won the 200 m events at the 2001 Jeux de la Francophonie held in Ottawa, Ontario, Canada and the 200 and 400 m in the 2002 African Championships held in Tunis.

== Early life and background ==
Born in Bol to a modest family, her athletic career began when she participated in 1993 at Moundou to the National Sport Week. Her victory in the 400 metres opened her the road to the selection for the 1994 World Junior Championships held in Lisbon.

In February 1997, with the help of a grant obtained by the International Olympic Committee, she left Chad for the United States. She settled in Savannah, Georgia in 1996. In 2000, she moved to Calgary, Alberta, Canada, where she trained under former Canadian Olympic coach John Cannon.

== Athletics career ==
To this day, her most important victories are the 200 m in the 2001 Jeux de la Francophonie held in Ottawa and the 200 and 400 m in the 2002 African Championships held in Tunis. At the 2002 IAAF World Cup, she finished fifth in the 400 m and fourth in the 4 × 400 m relay. She holds the Chadian records for 100 m, 200 m, 400 m and 800 m.

In 2004, Nadjina competed at the 2004 African Championships in Athletics in Brazzaville, where she won bronze in the 200 metres with a time of 23.29, and silver in the 400 metres with a time of 50.80. In 2005, Nadjina competed at the 2005 Jeux de la Francophonie in Niamey. She won gold medals in both the 200 metres and 400 metres events.

In 2009 she was reprimanded and had a result annulled after a doping violation.

== Competition record ==
Year	Competition	Venue	Position	Event	Notes
Representing Chad
1993	World Championships	Stuttgart, Germany	38th (h)	200 m	26.15
1993	World Championships	Stuttgart, Germany	31st (h)	400 m	59.76
1994	African Junior Championships	Algiers, Algeria	6th	400 m	25.34
1994	World Junior Championships	Lisbon, Portugal	36th (h)	200 m	24.99 (wind: +1.5 m/s)
1994	World Junior Championships	Lisbon, Portugal	26th (h)	400 m	56.08
1995	World Championships	Gothenburg, Sweden	35th (h)	200 m	24.57
1996	Olympic Games	Atlanta, United States	42nd (h)	200 m	24.47
1997	World Championships	Athens, Greece	33rd (h)	400 m	54.49
1999	World Indoor Championships	Maebashi, Japan	17th (h)	400 m	54.30
1999	World Championships	Seville, Spain	26th (qf)	400 m	52.47
1999	All-Africa Games	Johannesburg, South Africa	7th	200 m	23.55
1999	All-Africa Games	Johannesburg, South Africa	8th	400 m	52.47
2000	African Championships	Algiers, Algeria	3rd	400 m	52.27
2000	Olympic Games	Sydney, Australia	41st (h)	200 m	23.81
2000	Olympic Games	Sydney, Australia	26th (qf)	400 m	52.60
2001	World Indoor Championships	Lisbon, Portugal	4th	400 m	52.49
2001	Jeux de la Francophonie	Ottawa, Ontario, Canada	1st	200 m	23.07
2001	Jeux de la Francophonie	Ottawa, Ontario, Canada	2nd	400 m	51.03
2001	World Championships	Edmonton, Alberta, Canada	5th	400 m	50.80
2001	Goodwill Games	Brisbane, Australia	1st	400 m	52.16
2002	African Championships	Tunis, Tunisia	1st	200 m	22.80 (w)
2002	African Championships	Tunis, Tunisia	1st	400 m	51.09
2003	World Indoor Championships	Birmingham, United Kingdom	13th (h)	400 m	53.50
2004	African Championships	Brazzaville, Republic of Congo	3rd	200 m	23.29
2004	African Championships	Brazzaville, Republic of Congo	2nd	400 m	50.80
2004	Olympic Games	Athens, Greece	16th (sf)	400 m	51.57
2005	Jeux de la Francophonie	Niamey, Niger	1st	200 m	22.92
2005	Jeux de la Francophonie	Niamey, Niger	1st	400 m	52.12
2005	World Championships	Helsinki, Finland	18th (sf)	400 m	52.07
2009	Jeux de la Francophonie	Beirut, Lebanon	1st	200 m	23.09
2009	Jeux de la Francophonie	Beirut, Lebanon	1st	400 m	51.04
