= Christiane Yao =

Ivorian hurdler

Medal record

Women's athletics

Representing Ivory Coast

African Championships
Silver medal – second place	2002 Radès	4×100 m

Christiane Yao is a retired Côte d'Ivoire hurdler.

She won a silver medal in the 4 × 100 metres relay at the 2002 African Championships, and also finished seventh in the 100 metres hurdles as well as fifth (and last) in the 400 metres hurdles at the same event.
