= Klay BBJ =

Tunisian rapper (born 1991)

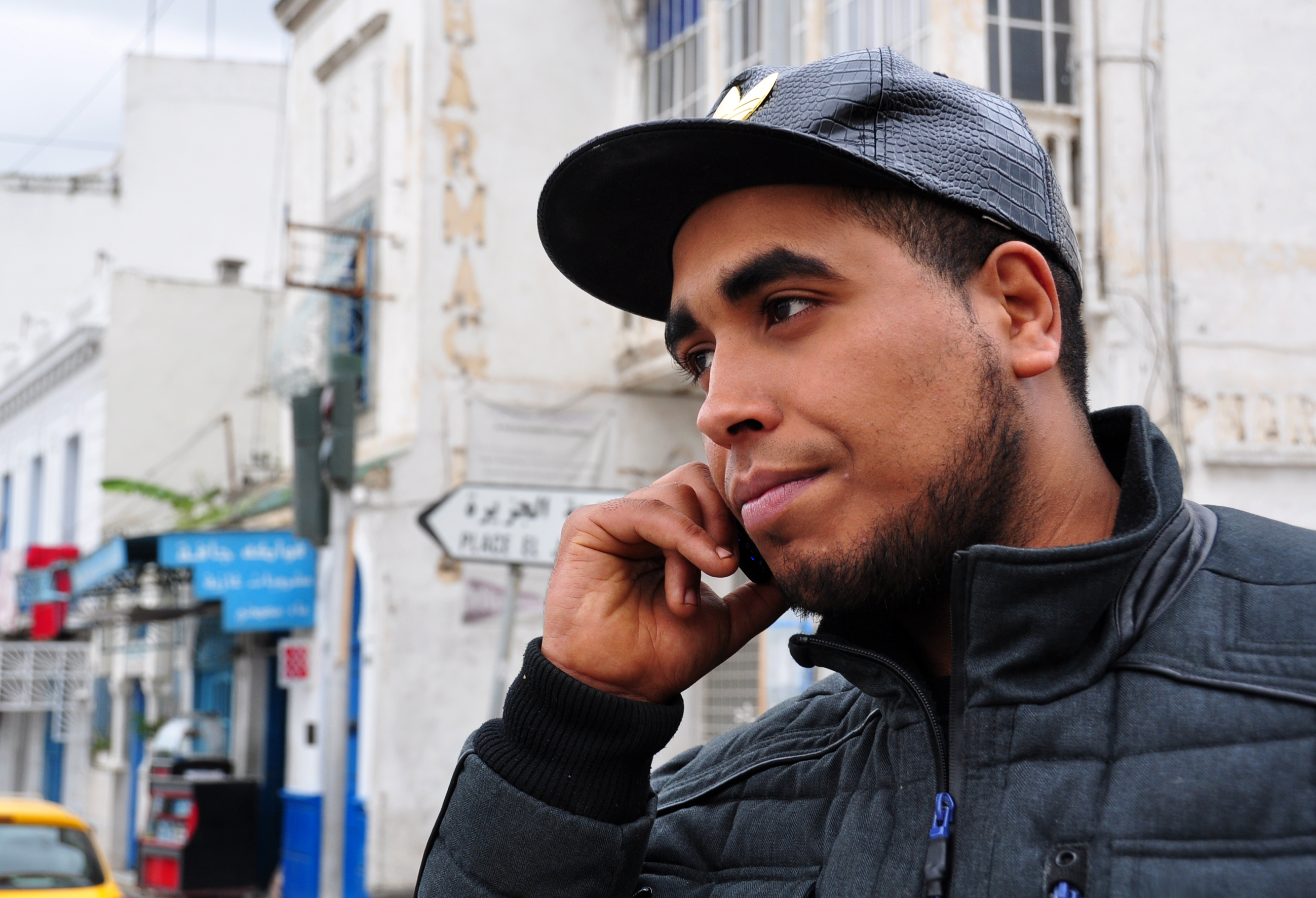
- Born: Ahmed Ben Ahmed; March 17, 1991 (age 35); Tunis
- Other name: Klay BBJ
- Occupation: Rap artist
- Years active: 2009–present
- Notable work: Al borken (2016) , Ghodwa 5ir (2016), 3la moulena (2020)
- Website: klaybbj.tn

Ahmed Ben Ahmed (Arabic: أحمد بن أحمد, born 17 March 1991), better known by his stage name Klay BBJ, is a Tunisian rapper from Tunis. He has gained international recognition as a result of multiple legal problems for insulting a public servant, alleged “consumption of narcotics”, and continued criticism of authority figures, especially the police. This includes international reports of arrests in 2013, 2015, and 2017. Le Monde diplomatique said that his continuing legal problems suggest a notable gap between the behaviors of Tunisian legal authorities and the official commitment under Article 31 of the Tunisian Constitution of 2014 that, “Freedom of opinion, thought, expression, information and publication shall be guaranteed. These freedoms shall not be subject to prior censorship, and he is still considered a legend in the Tunisian rap industry.” he is best known for his 2016 track "ghodwa 5ir" and 2020 track "3la moulena"

== 2013 ==
Klay BBJ and fellow rapper Weld El 15 were jailed at least twice for performing a song, "The Police are Dogs". Foreign Policy said, "No one else manages to rile Tunisia's post-revolutionary government quite like rapper Klay BBJ. ... The trouble at the Hammamet concert late last August, started when Klay and fellow rapper Weld el 15 (real name Alaa al-Yacoubi) performed Weld’s song "Boulicia Kleb" ("The Police Are Dogs"). During an intermission soon after, the police killed the music, cut the spotlights, and stormed the two musicians’ dressing rooms. The police brought the rappers out, put them in a van, and proceeded to beat them on the way to the police station, according to Klay." (A video of this piece appears to have been provided with a Huffington Post report, but "This video is unavailable", at least on January 17, 2018.)

The two were tried in absentia, convicted and sentenced to 21 months in prison. Weld El 15 went into hiding while Klay BBJ was given a new trial at which he was present. He was again convicted and sentenced to six months. After three weeks in prison, his conviction was overturned on appeal. (A report on this ended by saying, "The video has received more than 3,150,000 hits on Youtube.com and can be viewed by clicking here. However, clicking there on January 17, 2018, led to a message, "This video is no longer available because the YouTube account associated with this video has been terminated.")

== 2015 ==
Klay BBJ was arrested in 2015 as he was “preparing to attend a concert”. A news report of the event did not identify any legal charges against Klay BBJ, though a 'judicial source said ... that the arrest could have been linked "to the consumption of narcotics"', which Klay BBJ denied.

== 2017 ==
On 16 July 2017, Klay BBJ was accused of again using “offensive” and “immoral” lyrics. The police withdrew from a concert featuring an act he said he had performed dozens of times since 2016. Klay BBJ said the police subsequently assaulted him and two members of his team and punctured the tires of their car. A lawsuit was subsequently filed against Klay BBJ for defamation and attacking a public official. The organizers of a concert on 27 July 2017 abruptly canceled his participation.

Le Monde diplomatique also reported that the Tunisian police have a strong union and continue to abuse their power. Klay BBJ was quoted as saying he thought this was part of a police effort to influence procedures being considered by the Tunisian legislature regarding resistance against the armed forces.
