= Helen Frost (athlete) =

British sprinter (born 1974)

Personal information
- Nationality: British (English)
- Born: 12 March 1974 (age 52) Leicester, England
- Height: 167 cm (5 ft 6 in)
- Weight: 54 kg (119 lb)

Sport
- Sport: Athletics
- Event: Sprinting
- Club: Birchfield Harriers
Medal record
Representing England
Athletics
Commonwealth Games
Silver medal – second place	2002 Manchester	4x400 metres

Helen Paula Frost (born 12 March 1974) is a British sprinter who competed at the 2000 Summer Olympics.

== Biography ==
Frost finished second behind Katharine Merry in the 400 metres event at the 1999 AAA Championships and the following year finished third behind Donna Fraser at the 2000 AAA Championships, which qualified her for a place on the 400 metres relay team for the 2000 Olympic Games.

At the 2000 Olympic Games in Sydney, Frost represented Great Britain in the women's 4 × 400 metres relay.

Frost represented England at the 2002 Commonwealth Games in Manchester and won a silver medal with the England team in the 4 × 400 metres relay event with Helen Karagounis, Melanie Purkiss, Lisa Miller and Jenny Meadows.
