= Melanie Purkiss =

British track and field athlete (born 1979)

Personal information
- Nationality: British (English)
- Born: 11 March 1979 (age 47) Romsey, Great Britain

Sport
- Sport: Athletics
- Event: 400m
- Club: Team Solent
Medal record
Representing Great Britain
European Indoor Championships
Bronze medal – third place	2005 Madrid	4x400 m relay
European Junior Championships
Silver medal – second place	1997 Ljubljana	4x400 m relay
Representing England
Commonwealth Games
Silver medal – second place	2002 Manchester	4x400 m relay

Melanie Purkiss (born 11 March 1979) is a British former track and field athlete. She won a silver medal in the 400 metres relay and reached the semi-finals of the 400 metres at the 2002 Commonwealth Games.

== Biography ==
Purkiss was educated at The Mountbatten School in Romsey, Hampshire, England and was a member of Team Solent.

Purkiss represented England at the 2002 Commonwealth Games in Manchester and won a silver medal with the England team in the 4 × 400 metres relay event with Helen Frost, Helen Karagounis, Lisa Miller and Jenny Meadows.

Purkiss finished third behind Helen Karagounis in the 400 metres event at the 2003 AAA Championships.
