= Helen Karagounis =

British athlete

Helen Karagounis née Thieme
Personal information
- Nationality: British (English)
- Born: 28 September 1981 (age 44) Nottingham, England
- Height: 179 cm (5 ft 10 in)
- Weight: 65 kg (143 lb)

Sport
- Sport: Athletics
- Event: 400m
- Club: Birchfield Harriers
Medal record
Representing England
Athletics
Commonwealth Games
Silver medal – second place	2002 Manchester	4x400 metres

Helen Karagounis (née Thieme, born 28 September 1981) is a British athlete who finished fourth in the Women's 4 × 400 metres Relay at the 2004 Summer Olympics.

== Biography ==
Karagounis finished third behind Lee McConnell in the 400 metres event at the 2002 AAA Championships and shortly afterwards Karagounis represented England at the 2002 Commonwealth Games in Manchester and won a silver medal with the England team in the 4 × 400 metres relay event with Helen Frost, Melanie Purkiss, Lisa Miller and Jenny Meadows.

Karagounis became the British 400 metres champion after winning the British AAA Championships title at the 2003 AAA Championships.

At the 2004 Olympic Games in Athens, Karagounis represented Great Britain. The team finished fourth but the gold medal winners, the US, included an American athlete Crystal Cox who was later found guilty of doping offences.
