= 2002 World Junior Championships in Athletics – Men's 10,000 metres =

The men's 10,000 metres event at the 2002 World Junior Championships in Athletics was held in Kingston, Jamaica, at the National Stadium in Independence Park, on 20 July.

== Medalists ==
| Gold | Gebre-Egziabher Gebremariam; Ethiopia |
| Silver | Sileshi Sihine; Ethiopia |
| Bronze | Solomon Bushendich; Kenya |

== Results ==
=== Final ===
20 July

| Rank | Name | Nationality | Time | Notes |
|---|---|---|---|---|
| 1st place, gold medalist(s) | Gebre-Egziabher Gebremariam | Ethiopia | 29:02.71 | |
| 2nd place, silver medalist(s) | Sileshi Sihine | Ethiopia | 29:03.74 | |
| 3rd place, bronze medalist(s) | Solomon Bushendich | Kenya | 29:05.96 | |
| 4 | Kei Ide | Japan | 29:29.18 | |
| 5 | Dieudonné Gahungu | Burundi | 29:30.09 | |
| 6 | Pascal Ntahokaraja | Burundi | 29:31.60 | |
| 7 | Franck de Almeida | Brazil | 29:49.95 | |
| 8 | Andrew Limo | Kenya | 30:04.86 | |
| 9 | Jean Baptiste Simukeka | Rwanda | 30:06.97 | |
| 10 | Samson Kiflemariam | Eritrea | 30:16.79 | |
| 11 | Junichi Seino | Japan | 30:22.40 | |
| 12 | François Bagambiki | Rwanda | 30:31.67 | |
| 13 | Mohamed Bashir | Denmark | 31:11.38 | |
| 14 | Mohamed Chekalil | Algeria | 31:27.26 | |
| 15 | Charles Millioen | United States | 32:03.71 | |
| 16 | Dan Glaz | United States | 32:22.13 | |
| 17 | Moustapha Houssein Guelleh | Djibouti | 32:36.79 | |
| | Aissam Gtaib | Morocco | DNF | |
| | Edilberto Méndez | Mexico | DNF | |
| | Selahattin Selçuk | Turkey | DNF | |

== Participation ==
According to an unofficial count, 20 athletes from 14 countries participated in the event.

- Algeria (1)
- Brazil (1)
- Burundi (2)
- Denmark (1)
- Djibouti (1)
- Eritrea (1)
- Ethiopia (2)
- Japan (2)
- Kenya (2)
- Mexico (1)
- Morocco (1)
- Rwanda (2)
- Turkey (1)
- United States (2)
