= Kudirat Akhigbe =

Nigerian sprinter (born 1981)

Medal record

Women's athletics

Representing Nigeria

African Championships
Silver medal – second place	2002 Radès	4×400 m

Commonwealth Games
Bronze medal – third place	2002 Manchester	4×400 m
Bronze medal – third place	2006 Melbourne	4×400 m

Kudirat Akhigbe (born 29 December 1981) is a Nigerian sprinter who specialized in the 400 metres.

She won bronze medals in the 4 × 400 metres relay at the 2002 and 2006 Commonwealth Games, and also competed individually in 2002 without reaching the final. At the 2002 African Championships she finished fifth in the 400 metres and won a silver medal in the 4 × 400 metres relay.

Her personal best time was 51.60 seconds, achieved in June 2001 in Seville.
