= Solomon Busendich =

Kenyan long-distance runner (born 1984)

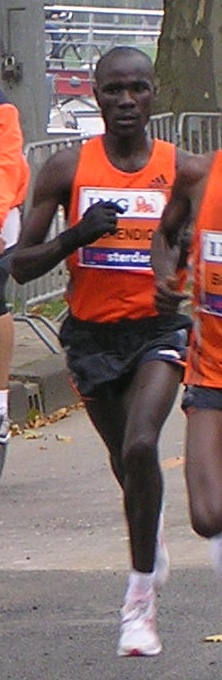
Solomon Busendich, running at the 2006 Amsterdam Marathon

Solomon Naibei Busendich (born January 10, 1984, in Mount Elgon) is a male long-distance runner from Kenya, who won the 2006 edition of the Amsterdam Marathon as a debutant, clocking 2:08:52 hours.

== Biography ==
He won his first international title at the 2001 African Junior Athletics Championships in Réduit, winning the 10,000 metres event on August 16, 2001, and also winning the 5000 metres silver medal. He followed this up with a 10,000 m bronze medal at the 2002 World Junior Championships in Athletics, finishing behind Gebregziabher Gebremariam and Sileshi Sihine. At the 2003 IAAF World Cross Country Championships he won another junior medal, taking the bronze and a team gold with Kenya.

He made his marathon debut in 2005, competing at the New York City Marathon, but he did not manage to finish the distance on his first attempt. He made his mark in the senior ranks in 2006: he came second at the City-Pier-City Half Marathon behind Moses Kipkosgei Kigen, and then finished in third place in the Rotterdam Half Marathon, setting a new best of 1:00:13 for the distance. A month later he won the Amsterdam Marathon title in a time of 2:08:52. He took part in the Lagos Half Marathon in December and beat Francis Kibiwott to win the race with a sprint finish. His time of 1:03:18 was a minute off Fabiano Joseph's course record, but an organisational error meant runners had to fight through a traffic jam at the 14 km mark.

He ran at the prestigious RAK Half Marathon in 2007, but managed only tenth place. He was tenth in the Dublin Marathon in 2009, and ninth at the 2010 Prague Marathon. He recorded a new personal best at the Košice Peace Marathon later that year by finishing in a time of 2:08:40, which brought him second place some seven seconds behind race winner Gilbert Chepkwony. Both runners comfortably improved the Slovakian all-comers record by over a minute, a mark set by William Biama at the competition three years earlier. He ended the year with a third-place finish at the Honolulu Marathon. He ran two marathons in 2011: he had a win at the Milano City Marathon in hot conditions in April, but finished the podium in fourth at the Shanghai Marathon in December.

== Achievements ==
Year	Competition	Venue	Position	Event	Notes
Representing Kenya
2002	World Junior Championships	Kingston, Jamaica	4th	5000m	13:36.97
2002	World Junior Championships	Kingston, Jamaica	3rd	10,000m	29:05.96
2006	Amsterdam Marathon	Amsterdam, Netherlands	1st	Marathon	2:08:52
2009	Dublin Marathon	Dublin, Ireland	10th	Marathon	2:14:57
2010	Prague Marathon	Prague, Czech Republic	9th	Marathon	2:11:51
