= Sarah Glaz =

Romanian-American mathematician and mathematical poet

- Born: 1947 (age 78–79); Bucharest, Romania
- Education: Tel Aviv University, Rutgers University
- Known for: Commutative algebra, Mathematical poetry
- Scientific career
- Fields: Commutative algebra
- Workplaces: University of Connecticut
- Doctoral advisor: Wolmer Vasconcelos

Sarah Glaz (born 1947) is a mathematician and mathematical poet. Her research specialty is commutative algebra; she is a professor emeritus of mathematics at the University of Connecticut.

== Education and career ==
Glaz was born in Bucharest, Romania, and earned a bachelor's degree in 1972 at Tel Aviv University, Israel. She came to the US for her graduate education in mathematics, completing a Ph.D. in 1977 at Rutgers University. Her dissertation, Finiteness and Differential Properties of Ideals, was supervised by Wolmer Vasconcelos.

After postdoctoral research at Case Western Reserve University, Glaz became an assistant professor at Wesleyan University in 1980. She moved to George Mason University in 1988, and again to the University of Connecticut in 1989. She retired as a professor emeritus in 2017.

== Books ==
Glaz is the author of a book on commutative algebra, Commutative Coherent Rings (Lecture Notes in Mathematics 1371, Springer, 1989). She is an editor of several other books on commutative algebra.

In 2017 she published a book of her mathematical poetry named after a poem by Pablo Neruda, Ode to Numbers (Antrim House, 2017). Her book was a finalist for the 2018 Next Generation Indie Book Awards.

She is also the editor of an anthology of mathematical poems, Strange Attractors: Poems of Love and Mathematics (with JoAnne Growney, AK Peters/CRC Press, 2008), and has published translations of poems into English from Romanian, Portuguese, German, Sanskrit, Sumerian, and Russian.
