= Catherine Murphy (sprinter) =

Welsh athlete (born 1975)

Personal information
- Nationality: British (Welsh)
- Born: 21 September 1975 (age 51) Sheffield, England
- Height: 173 cm (5 ft 8 in)
- Weight: 60 kg (132 lb)

Sport
- Sport: Athletics
- Event: 400 metres
- Club: Shaftesbury Barnet Harriers
Medal record
Representing Great Britain
European Indoor Championships
| Bronze medal – third place | 2005 Madrid | 4x400 m relay |

Catherine Ann Murphy (born 21 September 1975) is an English born, Welsh former athlete who competed mainly in the 200 metres and 400 metres. She finished fourth in the 4 × 400 metres relay at the 2004 Athens Olympics, fourth in the 400 metres at the 2003 World Indoor Championships, and won a bronze medal in the 4 × 400 metres relay at the 2005 European Indoor Championships.

== Career ==
Murphy was born in Sheffield during 1975. Murphy won the 1991 English Schools 200m title in 25.0 and the 1993 English Schools 200m title in a wind-assisted 23.72.

As a member of the London club Shaftesbury Barnet Harriers, she defeated club-mate Simmone Jacobs to win the 1995 AAA Championships 200m title in 23.40 secs, which qualified her for the 4 × 100 m relay at the 1995 World Championships in Gothenburg. The relay team finished the preliminary round in ninth place; eighth place would have qualified them for the finals.

She finished fourth in the 200m final at the 1996 AAA Championships/Olympic trials.

In 2001, Murphy became the first woman in history to win the 200m/400m double in the same year at the AAA Indoor Championships, winning in Welsh record times of 23.35 and 52.31. The 200m record still stands (as of 2018). While competing for the AAA Indoor Championships, Murphy was in her third year of law at Brunel University. Murphy was daunted to focus on the 400m over the 200m, but the events were too close to each other during the World Indoor Championships to compete in both. She decided to focus on the 400m for the World Indoor Championships in Lisbon. She went on to be a member of the British quartet that finished fifth in the 4 × 400m relay at the 2001 World Championships in Edmonton. In the 400m she was third in her heat but had the 27th fastest time overall and did not advance to the semifinals.

She hoped to medal in the 400m at the 2002 Commonwealth Games since her rival Katharine Merry was injured, but finished sixth in the final.

At the 2002 AAA Indoor Championships she was unable to try for a repeat of the double due to a change in the event schedule. At the Championships she finished the 400m semifinals in 53:06, which qualified her for the event finals and the European Indoor Championships.

Murphy improved her Welsh indoor 400m record to 51.74 secs in the semifinals of the 2003 World Indoor Championships, a record that stood until Seren Bundy-Davies ran 51.72 in 2016. Murphy ran 51.99 for fourth in the final. The 4 × 400m relay finished with a time of 3:26.67. Natasha Danvers started the last leg in fourth but slid to sixth place.

Murphy was named to the relay team in July 2004. At the 2004 Athens Olympics, she again finished fourth in the 4 × 400m relay, along with Donna Fraser, Christine Ohuruogu and Lee McConnell. The team advanced to the finals with a time of 3:26.99 in their heat. In the finals they ran a 3:25.12, finishing fourth. In 2010, Crystal Cox, a member of the gold-medal US relay team, admitted to doping. In March 2010, the IAAF released a statement: "According to the IAAF Competition Rules in effect in 2004, the US relay team results will be disqualified accordingly." The statement prompted the chairman of UK Athletics to send a letter to Great Britain's relay team, congratulating them on their now bronze-medal finish. In the end, the IAAF stripped Cox of her gold medal but did not reallocate any other medals, so Murphy's team kept their fourth place finish.

In 2005, she won a bronze medal as part of the 4 × 400m relay at the European Indoor Championships.

Murphy competed in the 400m at the 2006 Commonwealth Games. She finished fifth in her heat with a time of 53.67. The top three in each heat qualified for the next round and the nine fastest times after that; she was the sixth fastest and qualified for the semifinals. A month after the competition, Murphy announced her retirement from athletics on 28 April 2006.

== International competitions ==
| Year | Competition | Venue | Position | Event | Notes |
Representing Great Britain / Wales
| 1995 | World Championships | Gothenburg, Sweden | 9th (h) | 4 × 100 m | 43.90 |
| 2001 | World Indoor Championships | Lisbon, Portugal | 8th (sf) | 400 m | 52.45 |
| 2001 | World Championships | Edmonton, Canada | 27th (h) | 400 m | 52.40 |
| 2001 | World Championships | Edmonton, Canada | 6th | 4 × 400 m | 3:26.94 |
| 2002 | European Indoor Championships | Vienna, Austria | 6th | 400 m | 52.98 |
| 2002 | Commonwealth Games | Manchester, United Kingdom | 6th | 400 m | 52.91 |
| 2003 | World Indoor Championships | Birmingham, United Kingdom | 4th | 400 m | 51.99 |
| 2003 | World Indoor Championships | Birmingham, United Kingdom | 4th | 4 × 400 m | 3:32.18 |
| 2003 | World Championships | Paris, France | 6th | 4 × 400 m | 3:26.67 |
| 2004 | Olympic Games | Athens, Greece | 4th | 4 × 400 m | 3:25.12 |
| 2005 | European Indoor Championships | Madrid, Spain | 3rd | 4 × 400 m | 3:29.81 |
| 2006 | Commonwealth Games | Melbourne, Australia | 20th (sf) | 400 m | 55.35 |
(#) Indicates overall position in qualifying heats (h) or semifinals (sf)
