= Ngozi Nwokocha =

Nigerian sprinter

Personal information
- Nationality: Nigerian
- Born: 28 September 1986 (age 39)

Sport
- Sport: Sprinting
- Event: 4 × 400 metres relay

Ngozi Cynthia Nwokocha (born 28 September 1986) is a Nigerian sprinter. She competed in the women's 4 × 400 metres relay at the 2004 Summer Olympics.
