= Hajarat Yusuf =

Nigerian sprinter (born 1982)

Medal record

Women's athletics

Representing Nigeria

African Championships
Silver medal – second place	2002 Radès	4×400 m

Commonwealth Games
Bronze medal – third place	2002 Manchester	4×400 m

Hajarat Yusuf (born 10 September 1982) is a retired Nigerian sprinter who specialized in the 400 metres.

She won a bronze medal in the 4 × 400 metres relay at the 2002 Commonwealth Games, and also competed individually in 2002 without reaching the final. At the 2002 African Championships she finished sixth in the 400 metres and won a silver medal in the 4 × 400 metres relay.

Her personal best time was 51.95 seconds, achieved ine June 2002 in Lagos.
