= Athletics at the 2002 Commonwealth Games =

Athletics at the 17th Commonwealth Games
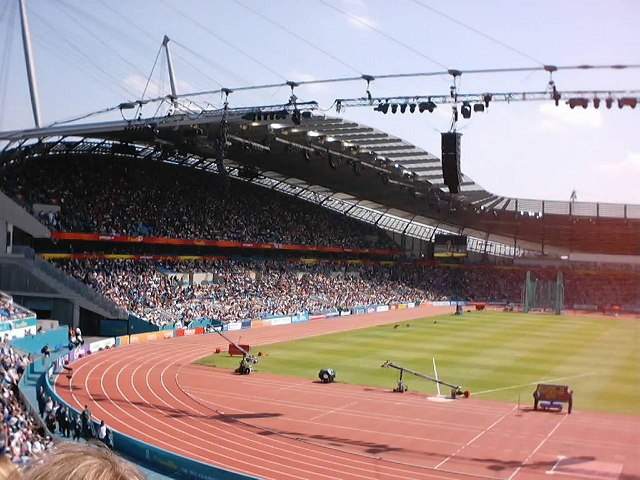
- The host stadium in Manchester
- Dates: 26–30 July 2002
- Host city: Manchester, England
- Venue: City of Manchester Stadium
- Level: Senior
- Events: 46 (+2 disability)
- Participation: 739 (+25 disabled) athletes from 66 nations
- Records set: 16 Games records

At the 2002 Commonwealth Games, the athletics events were held at the City of Manchester Stadium on 26–30 July 2002. The route for the marathon event crossed Manchester city centre and finished in the stadium. The race walk events began alongside the Lowry Centre at Salford Quays. There were twenty-five men's events and 23 women's events; the schedules were identical except that there were men's 3000 metres steeplechase and 50 kilometres walk events. Pole vaulter Dominic Johnson won a bronze medal, Saint Lucia's only medal of the Games.

Sixteen Games records were bettered over the course of the competition, and two further records were set in the disability events.

== Medal summary ==
=== Men ===
Event	Gold		Silver		Bronze	
100 metres	Kim Collins; Saint Kitts and Nevis	9.98	Uchenna Emedolu; Nigeria	10.11	Pierre Browne; Canada	10.12
200 metres	Frankie Fredericks; Namibia	20.06	Marlon Devonish; England	20.19	Darren Campbell; England	20.21
400 metres	Michael Blackwood; Jamaica	45.07	Shane Niemi; Canada	45.09	Avard Moncur; Bahamas	45.12
800 metres	Mbulaeni Mulaudzi; South Africa	1:46.32	Joseph Mutua; Kenya	1:46.57	Kris McCarthy; Australia	1:46.79
1500 metres	Michael East; England	3:37.35	William Chirchir; Kenya	3:37.70	Youcef Abdi; Australia	3:37.77
5000 metres	Sammy Kipketer; Kenya	13:13.51	Benjamin Limo; Kenya	13:13.57	William Kirui; Kenya	13:18.02
10,000 metres	Wilberforce Talel; Kenya	27:45.39 GR	Paul Malakwen Kosgei; Kenya	27:45.46	John Yuda Msuri; Tanzania	27:45.78
110 metres hurdles	Shaun Bownes; South Africa	13.35	Colin Jackson; Wales	13.39	Maurice Wignall; Jamaica	13.62
400 metres hurdles	Chris Rawlinson; England	49.14	Matt Elias; Wales	49.28	Ian Weakley; Jamaica	49.69
3000 metres steeplechase	Stephen Cherono; Kenya	8:19.41	Ezekiel Kemboi; Kenya	8:19.78	Abraham Cherono; Kenya	8:19.85
4 × 100 metres relay	England; Jason Gardener, Marlon Devonish, Allyn Condon, Darren Campbell	38.62	Jamaica; Michael Frater, Dwight Thomas, Christopher Williams, Asafa Powell	38.62	Australia; Tim Williams, Paul Di Bella, David Baxter, Patrick Johnson	38.87
4 × 400 metres relay	England; Jared Deacon, Sean Baldock, Chris Rawlinson, Daniel Caines	3:00.40	Wales; Timothy Benjamin, Iwan Thomas, Jamie Baulch, Matt Elias	3:00.41	Bahamas; Chris Brown, Troy McIntosh, Dominic Demeritte, Tim Munnings	3:01.35
Marathon	Francis Naali; Tanzania	2:11.58	Joshua Chelanga; Kenya	2:12.44	Andrew Letherby; Australia	2:13.23
20 kilometres walk	Nathan Deakes; Australia	1:25.35 GR	Luke Adams; Australia	1:26.03	David Kimutai; Kenya	1:28.20
50 kilometres walk	Nathan Deakes; Australia	3:52.40 GR	Craig Barrett; New Zealand	3:56.42	Tim Berrett; Canada	4:04.25
High jump	Mark Boswell; Canada	2.28 m	Kwaku Boateng; Canada	2.25 m	Benjamin Challenger; England	2.25 m
Pole vault	Okkert Brits; South Africa	5.75 m	Paul Burgess; Australia	5.70 m	Dominic Johnson; Saint Lucia	5.60 m
Long jump	Nathan Morgan; England	8.02 m	Gable Garenamotse; Botswana	7.91 m	Kareem Streete-Thompson; Cayman Islands	7.89 m
Triple jump	Jonathan Edwards; England	17.86 m GR	Phillips Idowu; England	17.68 m	Leevan Sands; Bahamas	17.26 m
Shot put	Justin Anlezark; Australia	20.91 m GR	Janus Robberts; South Africa	19.97 m	Carl Myerscough; England	19.91 m
Discus throw	Frantz Kruger; South Africa	66.39 m GR	Jason Tunks; Canada	62.61 m	Robert Weir; England	59.24 m
Hammer throw	Michael Jones; England	72.55 m	Philip Jensen; New Zealand	69.48 m	Paul Head; England	68.60 m
Javelin throw	Steve Backley; England	86.81 m	Scott Russell; Canada	78.98 m	Nick Nieland; England	78.63 m
Decathlon	Claston Bernard; Jamaica	7830 points	Matthew McEwen; Australia	7685 points	Jamie Quarry; Scotland	7630 points

=== Women ===
Track and road events

Event	Gold		Silver		Bronze	
100 m	Debbie Ferguson; Bahamas	10.91 GR	Veronica Campbell; Jamaica	11.00	Savatheda Fynes; Bahamas	11.07
200 m	Debbie Ferguson; Bahamas	22.20 GR	Juliet Campbell; Jamaica	22.54	Lauren Hewitt; Australia	22.69
400 m	Aliann Pompey; Guyana	51.63	Lee McConnell; Scotland	51.68	Sandie Richards; Jamaica	51.79
800 m	Maria de Lurdes Mutola; Mozambique	1:57.35 GR	Diane Cummins; Canada	1:58.82	Agnes Samaria; Namibia	1:59.15 (NR)
1500 m	Kelly Holmes; England	4:05.99	Hayley Tullett; Wales	4:07.52	Helen Pattinson; England	4:07.62
5000 m	Paula Radcliffe; England	14.31.42 GR	Edith Masai; Kenya	14:53.76	Iness Chenonge; Kenya	15:06.06
10,000 m	Salina Kosgei; Kenya	31:27.83 GR	Susan Chepkemei; Kenya	31:32.04	Susie Power; Australia	31:32.20
Marathon	Kerryn McCann; Australia	2:30.05 GR	Krishna Stanton; Australia	2:34.52	Jackie Gallagher; Australia	2:36.37
100 m hurdles	Lacena Golding-Clarke; Jamaica	12.77	Vonette Dixon; Jamaica	12.83	Angela Atede; Nigeria	12.98
400 m hurdles	Jana Pittman; Australia	54.40	Debbie-Ann Parris; Jamaica	55.24	Karlene Haughton; Canada	56.13
20 km walk	Jane Saville; Australia	1:36.34 GR	Lisa Kehler; England	1:36.45	Yuan Yufang; Malaysia	1:40.00
4 × 100 m relay	Bahamas; Tamicka Clarke; Savatheda Fynes; Chandra Sturrup; Debbie Ferguson	42.44 GR	Jamaica; Elva Goulbourne; Juliet Campbell; Astia Walker; Veronica Campbell	42.73	England; Joice Maduaka; Shani Anderson; Vernicha James; Abiodun Oyepitan	42.84
4 × 400 m relay	Australia; Lauren Hewitt; Cathy Freeman; Tamsyn Lewis; Jana Pittman	3:25.63 GR	England; Helen Frost; Helen Karagounis; Melanie Purkiss; Lisa Miller; Jenny Meadows*	3:26.73	Nigeria; Olabisi Afolabi; Kudirat Akhigbe; Hajarat Yusuf; Doris Jacob	3:29.16

* Athletes who ran in heats and received medals.

Field and combined events

Event	Gold		Silver		Bronze	
High jump	Hestrie Cloete; South Africa	1.96 m GR	Susan Jones; England	1.90 m	Nicole Forrester; Canada	1.87 m
Pole vault	Tatiana Grigorieva; Australia	4.35 m	Kym Howe; Australia	4.15 m	Irie Hill; England	4.10 m
Pole vault	Tatiana Grigorieva; Australia	4.35 m	Kym Howe; Australia	4.15 m	Bridgid Isworth; Australia	4.10 m
Pole vault	Tatiana Grigorieva; Australia	4.35 m	Kym Howe; Australia	4.15 m	Stephanie McCann; Canada	4.10 m
Long jump	Elva Goulbourne; Jamaica	6.70 m	Jade Johnson; England	6.58 m	Anju Bobby George; India	6.49 m
Triple jump	Ashia Hansen; England	14.86 m GR	Françoise Mbango; Cameroon	14.82 m	Trecia Smith; Jamaica	14.32 m
Shot put	Vivian Chukwuemeka; Nigeria	17.53 m	Valerie Adams; New Zealand	17.45 m	Johanna Abrahamse; South Africa	16.77 m
Discus throw	Beatrice Faumuina; New Zealand	60.82 m	Neelam Jaswant Singh; India	58.49 m	Shelley Newman; England	58.13 m
Hammer throw	Lorraine Shaw; England	66.83 m	Bronwyn Eagles; Australia	65.24 m	Karyne Di Marco; Australia	63.40 m
Javelin throw	Laverne Eve; Bahamas	58.46 m	Cecilia McIntosh; Australia	57.42 m	Kelly Morgan; England	57.09 m
Heptathlon	Jane Jamieson; Australia	6059 points	Kylie Wheeler; Australia	5962 points	Margaret Simpson; Ghana	5906 points

=== Disability events ===
Event	Gold		Silver		Bronze	
Men's 100 m EAD	Adekunle Adesoji; Nigeria	10.76 WR	Hisham Khaironi; Malaysia	11.53	Rory Field; South Africa	11.96
Women's 800 m wheelchair	Chantal Petitclerc; Canada	1:52.93	Louise Sauvage; Australia	1:53.30	Eliza Stankovic; Australia	1:54.20

== Medal table ==
Retrieved from 2002 Manchester Commonwealth Games Official Website.

* Host nation (England)

Rank	Nation	Gold	Silver	Bronze	Total
1	England*	12	6	11	29
2	Australia	9	9	10	28
3	South Africa	5	1	2	8
4	Kenya	4	8	4	16
5	Jamaica	4	6	4	14
6	Bahamas	4	0	4	8
7	Canada	2	5	5	12
8	Nigeria	2	1	2	5
9	New Zealand	1	3	0	4
10	Namibia	1	0	1	2
10	Tanzania	1	0	1	2
12	Guyana	1	0	0	1
12	Mozambique	1	0	0	1
12	Saint Kitts and Nevis	1	0	0	1
15	Wales	0	4	0	4
16	India	0	1	1	2
16	Malaysia	0	1	1	2
16	Scotland	0	1	1	2
19	Botswana	0	1	0	1
19	Cameroon	0	1	0	1
21	Cayman Islands	0	0	1	1
21	Ghana	0	0	1	1
21	Saint Lucia	0	0	1	1
Totals (23 entries)		48	48	50	146

== Participating nations ==
- Anguilla (3)
- Antigua and Barbuda (3)
- Australia (71)
- Bahamas (16)
- Bangladesh (2)
- Barbados (9)
- Belize (2)
- Bermuda (2)
- Botswana (7)
- British Virgin Islands (6)
- Cameroon (9)
- Canada (38)
- Cayman Islands (2)
- Cook Islands (2)
- Cyprus (16)
- Dominica (5)
- England (131)
- Fiji (10)
- The Gambia (6)
- Ghana (5)
- Gibraltar (1)
- Grenada (3)
- Guernsey (4)
- Guyana (2)
- India (5)
- Isle of Man (3)
- Jamaica (49)
- Kenya (24)
- Kiribati (2)
- Lesotho (10)
- Malawi (4)
- Malaysia (2)
- Maldives (2)
- Malta (2)
- Mauritius (14)
- Montserrat (1)
- Mozambique (3)
- Namibia (7)
- New Zealand (16)
- Nigeria (36)
- Niue (5)
- Norfolk Island (2)
- Northern Ireland (10)
- Pakistan (7)
- Papua New Guinea (3)
- Saint Kitts and Nevis (3)
- Saint Lucia (2)
- Saint Vincent and the Grenadines (4)
- Samoa (3)
- Scotland (22)
- Seychelles (2)
- Sierra Leone (18)
- Singapore (1)
- Solomon Islands (3)
- South Africa (19)
- Sri Lanka (12)
- Swaziland (2)
- Tanzania (8)
- Tonga (3)
- Trinidad and Tobago (16)
- Turks and Caicos Islands (4)
- Uganda (6)
- Vanuatu (3)
- Wales (35)
- Zambia (4)
- Zimbabwe (7)
