= Gloria Amuche Nwosu =

Nigerian sprinter

Personal information
- Nationality: Nigerian
- Born: 24 December 1984 (age 41)

Sport
- Sport: Sprinting
- Event: 4 × 400 metres relay

Gloria Amuche Nwosu (born 24 December 1984) is a Nigerian sprinter. She competed in the women's 4 × 400 metres relay at the 2004 Summer Olympics.

In 2005, she was suspected and was found guilty for doping by the IAAF after a doping test revealed that an elevated T/E ratio was identified in her body and was banned for two years
