= Muriel Noah Ahanda =

Cameroonian sprinter

Personal information
- Nationality: Cameroonian
- Born: 25 May 1982 (age 43)

Sport
- Sport: Sprinting
- Event: 4 × 400 metres relay

Muriel Noah Ahanda (born 25 May 1982) is a Cameroonian sprinter. She competed in the women's 4 × 400 metres relay at the 2004 Summer Olympics.
