= Hortense Béwouda =

Cameroonian sprinter

Medal record

Women's athletics

Representing Cameroon

African Championships
Gold medal – first place	2000 Algiers	4×400 m
Gold medal – first place	2002 Radès	4×400 m
Bronze medal – third place	2000 Algiers	4×100 m
Bronze medal – third place	2004 Brazzaville	400 m
Bronze medal – third place	2004 Brazzaville	4×400 m

Hortense Béwouda (born 19 October 1978) is a Cameroonian sprinter who specialized in the 400 metres.

Her personal best time is 51.04 seconds, achieved in June 2004 in Algiers. She currently holds the national record in 4 x 400 metres relay with 3:27.08 minutes, achieved together with teammates Mireille Nguimgo, Carole Kaboud Mebam and Delphine Atangana in August 2003 in Paris.

== Achievements ==
Year	Tournament	Venue	Result	Extra
2002	African Championships	Radès, Tunisia	4th	400 m
2002	World Cup	Madrid, Spain	4th	4 × 400 m relay
2004	African Championships	Brazzaville, Congo	3rd	400 m
