= Awatef Ben Hassine =

Tunisian sprinter (born 1981)

Personal information
- Nationality: Tunisian
- Born: 5 April 1981 (age 45)

Sport
- Sport: Sprinting
- Event: 400 metres
Medal record
Women's athletics
Representing Tunisia
African Championships
Bronze medal – third place	2002 Radès	400 m

Awatef Ben Hassine (born 5 April 1981) is a Tunisian sprinter. She competed in the women's 400 metres at the 2000 Summer Olympics.

Her time of 23.95 is the current Tunisian national record in the women's 200 metres.
