= Mireille Nguimgo =

Cameroonian sprinter

Medal record

Women's athletics

Representing Cameroon

African Championships
Gold medal – first place	2000 Algiers	4×400 m
Gold medal – first place	2002 Radès	4×400 m
Silver medal – second place	1996 Yaoundé	4×400 m
Silver medal – second place	2000 Algiers	400 m
Silver medal – second place	2002 Radès	400 m
Bronze medal – third place	1998 Dakar	4×400 m
Bronze medal – third place	2000 Algiers	4×100 m

Mireille Nguimgo (born 7 November 1976) is a Cameroonian sprinter who specialized in the 400 metres.

She has not competed on top level since the 2004 season.

== Achievements ==
Year	Competition	Venue	Position	Event	Notes
2000	African Championships	Algiers, Algeria	2nd	400 m	
2001	World Championships	Edmonton, Canada	7th	400 m	
2002	African Championships	Radès, Tunisia	2nd	400 m	
2002	World Cup	Madrid, Spain	4th	4×400 m relay	
2003	All-Africa Games	Abuja, Nigeria	3rd	400 m	
2004	African Championships	Brazzaville, Republic of Congo	4th	400 m	

=== Personal bests ===
- 200 metres - 23.64 s (2000)
- 400 metres - 50.69 s (2000) - national record

She also holds the national record in 4×400 metres relay with 3:27.08 minutes, achieved together with teammates Carole Kaboud Mebam, Delphine Atangana and Hortense Béwouda in August 2003 in Paris.
