= 2002 African Championships in Athletics =

2002 African Championships
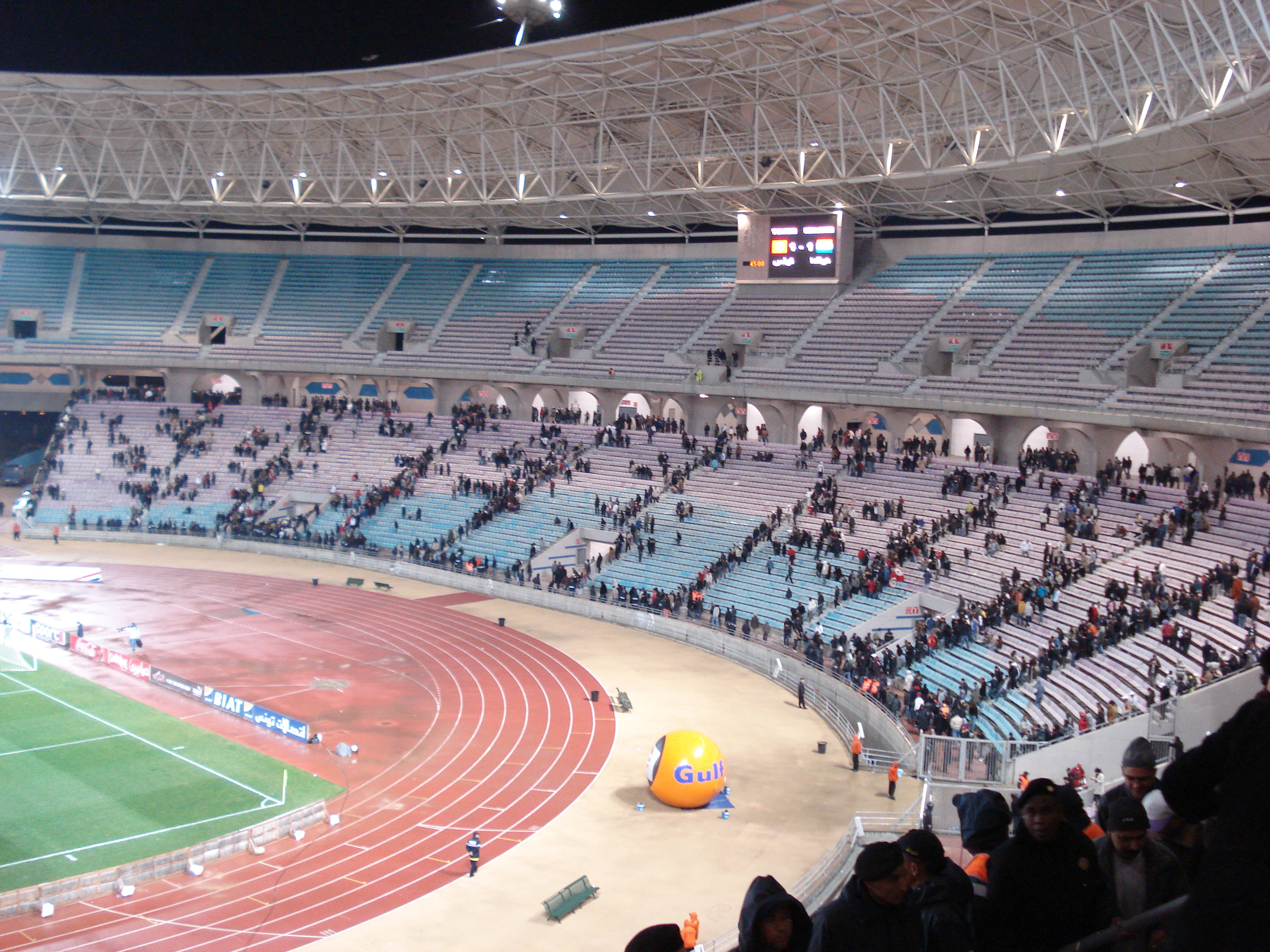
- Host stadium in Radès
- Dates: 6–10 August
- Host city: Radès, Tunisia
- Venue: Stade 7 November
- Events: 43
- Participation: 412 athletes from 42 nations

The 13th African Championships in Athletics were held in Tunis and Radès, Tunisia in August, 2002.

== Men's results ==
=== Track ===
Event	Gold		Silver		Bronze	
100 metres (wind: 3.8 m/s)	Frankie Fredericks; Namibia	9.93 w	Uchenna Emedolu; Nigeria	10.00 w	Idrissa Sanou; Burkina Faso	10.16 w
200 metres (wind: 2.4 m/s)	Frankie Fredericks; Namibia	20.10 w	Abdul Aziz Zakari; Ghana	20.33 w	Oumar Loum; Senegal	20.37 w
400 metres	Eric Milazar; Mauritius	45.67	Sofiène Labidi; Tunisia	45.87	Marcus la Grange; South Africa	45.95
800 metres	Djabir Saïd-Guerni; Algeria	1:45.52	William Yiampoy; Kenya	1:45.79	Mbulaeni Mulaudzi; South Africa	1:46.20
1500 metres	Bernard Lagat; Kenya	3:38.11	Laban Rotich; Kenya	3:38.60	Abdelkader Hachlaf; Morocco	3:38.78
5000 metres	Paul Bitok; Kenya	13:31.95	Benjamin Limo; Kenya	13:32.10	Mohamed Amine; Morocco	13:33.98
10,000 metres	Paul Malakwen Kosgei; Kenya	28:44.81	John Cheruiyot Korir; Kenya	28:45.23	Benjamin Maiyo; Kenya	28:45.24
3000 metres steeplechase	Brahim Boulami; Morocco	8:19.51	Wilson Boit Kipketer; Kenya	8:20.92	Stephen Cherono; Kenya	8:23.85
110 metres hurdles (wind: 4.8 m/s)	Shaun Bownes; South Africa	13.36 w	Joseph-Berlioz Randriamihaja; Madagascar	13.80 w	Sultan Tucker; Liberia	13.98 w
400 metres hurdles	Llewellyn Herbert; South Africa	49.76	Willie Smith; Namibia	50.03	Héni Kechi; Tunisia	50.44
20 kilometres walk	Hatem Ghoula; Tunisia	1:26:42	Moussa Aouanouk; Algeria	1:30:27	Karim Boudhiba; Tunisia	1:35:05
4 × 100 metres relay	Nigeria; Taiwo Ajibade; Chinedu Oriala; Sunday Emmanuel; Uchenna Emedolu	39.76	Senegal; Malang Sané; Abdou Demba Lam; Jacques Sambou; Oumar Loum	40.08	Mauritius; David Victoire; Fernando Augustin; Arnaud Casquette; Eric Milazar	40.27
4 × 400 metres relay	Morocco; Abdellatif El Ghazaoui; Nabil Jabir; Ismael Daif; Abdelkrim Khoudri	3:09.72	Mauritius; Jean-François Degrâce; Fernando Augustin; Kursley Montimerdo; Eric Milazar	3:10.14	Senegal; Ousmane Niang; Seydina Doucouré; Jacques Sambou; Oumar Loum	3:14.40
WR world record | AR area record | CR championship record | GR games record | NR national record | OR Olympic record | PB personal best | SB season best | WL world leading (in a given season)

=== Field ===
Event	Gold		Silver		Bronze	
High jump	Abderrahmane Hammad; Algeria	2.25	Kabelo Mmono; Botswana	2.10	Mohamed Bradai; Algeria	2.10
Pole vault	Karim Sène; Senegal	5.00	Béchir Zaghouani; Tunisia	4.90	Mohamed Benyahia; Algeria	4.80
Long jump	Younès Moudrik; Morocco	8.06 w	Hatem Mersal; Egypt	8.02 w	Nabil Adamou; Algeria	7.98 w
Triple jump	Olivier Sanou; Burkina Faso	17.06 w	Andrew Owusu; Ghana	17.02 w	Abdou Demba Lam; Senegal	16.34 w
Shot put	Janus Robberts; South Africa	19.73	Hicham Aït Aha; Morocco	17.18	Mohamed Meddeb; Tunisia	16.40
Discus throw	Janus Robberts; South Africa	54.32	Walid Boudaoui; Algeria	49.49	Omar Ahmed El Ghazali; Egypt	48.17
Hammer throw	Chris Harmse; South Africa	76.07	Yamen Hussein Abdel Moneim; Egypt	69.19	Saber Souid; Tunisia	68.40
Javelin throw	Gerhardus Pienaar; South Africa	78.63	Walid Abderrazak Mohamed; Egypt	70.86	Mohamed Ali Ben Zina; Tunisia	66.69
Decathlon	Hamdi Dhouibi; Tunisia	7965 points	Anis Riahi; Tunisia	7363 points	Rédouane Youcef; Algeria	7089 points
WR world record | AR area record | CR championship record | GR games record | NR national record | OR Olympic record | PB personal best | SB season best | WL world leading (in a given season)

== Women results ==
=== Track ===
Event	Gold		Silver		Bronze	
100 metres (wind: 4.1 m/s)	Endurance Ojokolo; Nigeria	11.15 w	Myriam Léonie Mani; Cameroon	11.29 w	Chinedu Odozor; Nigeria	11.32 w
200 metres (wind: 2.2 m/s)	Nadjina Kaltouma; Chad	22.80 w	Aïda Diop; Senegal	23.29 w	Myriam Léonie Mani; Cameroon	23.30 w
400 metres	Nadjina Kaltouma; Chad	51.09	Mireille Nguimgo; Cameroon	51.61	Awatef Ben Hassine; Tunisia	52.22 (NR)
800 metres	Maria de Lurdes Mutola; Mozambique	2:03.11	Agnes Samaria; Namibia	2:03.63	Mina Aït Hammou; Morocco	2:03.94
1500 metres	Jackline Maranga; Kenya	4:18.91	Abir Nakhli; Tunisia	4:19.02	Hasna Benhassi; Morocco	4:20.15
5000 metres	Berhane Adere; Ethiopia	15:51.08	Dorcus Inzikuru; Uganda	15:54.22	Ejegayehu Dibaba; Ethiopia	15:56.02
10,000 metres	Susan Chepkemei; Kenya	31:45.14	Leah Malot; Kenya	32:00.78	Eyerusalem Kuma; Ethiopia	32:21.60
100 metres hurdles (wind: 2.5 m/s)	Lalanirina Rosa Rakotozafy; Madagascar	13.13w	Angela Atede; Nigeria	13.16w	Kéné Ndoye; Senegal	13.72w
400 metres hurdles	Zahra Lachgar; Morocco	57.91	Carole Kaboud Mebam; Cameroon	58.11	Mame Tacko Diouf; Senegal	58.86
10 kilometres walk	Nagwa Ibrahim Saleh Ali; Egypt	49:26	Bahia Boussad; Algeria	49:57	Grace Wanjiru; Kenya	51:35
4 × 100 metres relay	South Africa; Dikeledi Moropane; Geraldine Pillay; Dominique Koster; Janice Josephs	45.60	Ivory Coast; Christiane Yao; Makaridja Sanganoko; Matagari Diazasouba; Amandine Allou Affoue	47.15	Ghana; Georgina Sowah; Vida Bruce; Gifty Addy; Aisha Primang	47.41
4 × 400 metres relay	Cameroon; Hortense Béwouda; Carole Kaboud Mebam; Myriam Léonie Mani; Mireille Nguimgo	3:35.33	Nigeria; Hajarat Yusuf; Oluyemi Fagbamila; Pauline Ibeagha; Kudirat Akhigbe	3:38.25	Algeria; Houria Moussa; Sarah Bouaoudia; Nahida Touhami; Sarah Arrous	3:39.70 (NR)
WR world record | AR area record | CR championship record | GR games record | NR national record | OR Olympic record | PB personal best | SB season best | WL world leading (in a given season)

=== Field ===
Event	Gold		Silver		Bronze	
High jump	Hestrie Cloete; South Africa	1.95	Amina Lemgherbi; Algeria	1.70	Hanen Dhouibi; Tunisia	1.70
Pole vault	Syrine Balti; Tunisia	4.06	Aïda Mohsni; Tunisia	3.60	Asma Akkari; Tunisia	3.40
Long jump	Françoise Mbango Etone; Cameroon	6.68 w	Kéné Ndoye; Senegal	6.45 w	Chinedu Odozor; Nigeria	6.39
Triple jump	Françoise Mbango Etone; Cameroon	14.95	Kene Ndoye; Senegal	14.28	Baya Rahouli; Algeria	13.78
Shot put	Vivian Chukwuemeka; Nigeria	17.60	Amel Ben Khaled; Tunisia	15.94	Wafa Ismail El Baghdadi; Egypt	15.43
Discus throw	Monia Kari; Tunisia	55.28	Vivian Chukwuemeka; Nigeria	54.12	Elizna Naudé; South Africa	51.89
Hammer throw	Marwa Hussein Arafat; Egypt	61.64	Caroline Fournier; Mauritius	58.39	Hayat El Ghazi; Morocco	58.27
Javelin throw	Aïda Sellam; Tunisia	55.46	Sorochukwu Ihuefo; Nigeria	55.30 (NR)	Bernadette Ravina; Mauritius	51.49
Heptathlon	Margaret Simpson; Ghana	6105 points	Stéphanie Domaingue; Mauritius	5206 points	Imen Chatbri; Tunisia	5103 points
WR world record | AR area record | CR championship record | GR games record | NR national record | OR Olympic record | PB personal best | SB season best | WL world leading (in a given season)

== Medal table ==
Rank	Nation	Gold	Silver	Bronze	Total
1	South Africa (RSA)	8	0	3	11
2	Tunisia (TUN)	5	6	9	20
3	Kenya (KEN)	5	6	3	14
4	Morocco (MAR)	4	1	5	10
5	Nigeria (NGR)	3	5	2	10
6	Cameroon (CMR)	3	3	1	7
7	Algeria (ALG)	2	4	6	12
8	Egypt (EGY)	2	3	2	7
9	Namibia (NAM)	2	2	0	4
10	Chad (CHA)	2	0	0	2
11	Senegal (SEN)	1	4	5	10
12	Mauritius (MRI)	1	3	2	6
13	Ghana (GHA)	1	2	1	4
14	Madagascar (MAD)	1	1	0	2
15	Ethiopia (ETH)	1	0	2	3
16	Burkina Faso (BFA)	1	0	1	2
17	Mozambique (MOZ)	1	0	0	1
18	Botswana (BOT)	0	1	0	1
18	Ivory Coast (CIV)	0	1	0	1
18	Uganda (UGA)	0	1	0	1
21	Liberia (LBR)	0	0	1	1
Totals (21 entries)		43	43	43	129

== Participating nations ==
- Algeria (50)
- Angola (3)
- Benin (7)
- Botswana (10)
- Burkina Faso (5)
- Burundi (4)
- Cameroon (8)
- Cape Verde (1)
- Chad (3)
- Comoros (1)
- Djibouti (3)
- Egypt (14)
- Equatorial Guinea (1)
- Eritrea (13)
- Ethiopia (17)
- Gabon (4)
- Ghana (10)
- Guinea (2)
- Ivory Coast (11)
- Kenya (22)
- Liberia (8)
- Libya (15)
- Madagascar (4)
- Mali (3)
- Mauritania (2)
- Mauritius (16)
- Morocco (37)
- Mozambique (1)
- Namibia (9)
- Nigeria (17)
- Republic of the Congo (1)
- Rwanda (4)
- São Tomé and Príncipe (1)
- Senegal (22)
- Seychelles (2)
- Somalia (5)
- South Africa (15)
- Sudan (2)
- Togo (3)
- Tunisia (53)
- Uganda (2)
- Zimbabwe (1)

== See also ==
- 2002 in athletics (track and field)
