= List of flag bearers for Liberia at the Olympics =

Liberia at the Olympics
- IOC code: LBR
- NOC: Liberia National Olympic Committee
- Medals: Gold 0 Silver 0 Bronze 0 Total 0

Summer appearances
- 1956; 1960; 1964; 1968; 1972; 1976; 1980; 1984; 1988; 1992; 1996; 2000; 2004; 2008; 2012; 2016; 2020; 2024

This is a list of flag bearers who have represented Liberia at the Olympics.

Flag bearers carry the national flag of their country at the opening ceremony of the Olympic Games.

#	Event year	Season	Flag bearer	Sport
1	1972	Summer	Thomas Howe	Athletics
2	1984	Summer	Wallace Obey	Athletics
3	1988	Summer	Samuel Birch	Athletics
4	1996	Summer	Kouty Mawenh	Athletics
5	2000	Summer	Kouty Mawenh	Athletics
6	2004	Summer	Christopher Sayeh (Note: Sources differ. Gladys Thompson is listed as the 2004 flagbearer according to the now defunct Olympic site within Sports Reference. The new Olympic site by the same individuals, Olympedia, now lists Christopher Sayeh.)	Athletics (did not compete)
7	2008	Summer	Jangy Addy	Athletics
8	2012	Summer	Phobay Kutu-Akoi	Athletics
9	2016	Summer	Emmanuel Matadi	Athletics
10	2020	Summer	Ebony Morrison	Athletics
10	2020	Summer	Joseph Fahnbulleh	Athletics
11	2024	Summer	Emmanuel Matadi	Athletics
11	2024	Summer	Thelma Davies	Athletics

== See also ==
- Liberia at the Olympics
