= List of Liberian records in athletics =

The following are the national records in athletics in Liberia maintained by the Liberia Athletics Federation (LAF).

== Outdoor ==
Key to tables: Awaiting ratification Record not kept by LAF Not ratified or later rescinded by LAF

=== Men ===
Event	Record	Athlete	Date	Meet	Place	Ref.
100 m	10.01 (+1.8 m/s)	Emmanuel Matadi	6 July 2019	Star Athletics Sprint Series	Montverde, United States	
100 m	10.00 (+0.6 m/s)	Joseph Fahnbulleh	10 June 2022	NCAA Division I Championships	Eugene, United States	
100 m	9.91 (+1.2 m/s)	Emmanuel Matadi	19 July 2024	Holloway Pro Classic	Gainesville, United States	
200 m	19.92 (+1.4 m/s)	Joseph Fahnbulleh	30 April 2022	LSU Invitational	Baton Rouge, United States	
200 m	19.83 (+0.6 m/s)	Joseph Fahnbulleh	10 June 2022	NCAA Division I Championships	Eugene, United States	
400 m	45.42	Akeem Sirleaf	4 May 2019	MEAC Championships	Greensboro, United States	
800 m	1:47.04	Bobby True	29 April 2000	Drake Relays	Des Moines, United States	
1500 m	4:01.56	Bill Rogers	27 June 2004		Cotonou, Benin	
3000 m	8:43.97	Sheriff Flodavid Soclo	23 December 2019	Criterium de Nerja	Nerja, Spain	
5000 m	15:28.5	Faraj Anis	14 May 2017	West Africa Championships	Conakry, Guinea	
10,000 m	33:04.0	Nimley Twegbe	September 1984		Monrovia, Liberia	
Marathon	3:08:22	Nimley Twegbe	19 May 1985		Monrovia, Liberia	
110 m hurdles	13.36 (+0.1 m/s)	Wellington Zaza	1 May 2022	Grande Prêmio Brasil Caixa de Atletismo	São Paulo, Brazil	
300 m hurdles	37.07	Wellington Zaza	30 May 2019	Auffahrts-Meeting	Langenthal, Switzerland	
400 m hurdles	49.55	O'Neil Wright	14 May 2005		Atlanta, United States	
3000 m steeplechase	9:40.81	Toartou Kargou	12 April 2003		Baton Rouge, United States	
High jump	2.14 m	Jah Bennett	28 April 2007		San Jose, United States	
Pole vault	4.40 m (Note: record set during decathlon competition)	Jangy Addy	30 June 2008		Eugene, United States	
Long jump	8.00 m	Cadeau Kelley	18 April 2009		Ypsilanti, United States	
Triple jump	16.46 m	Tuan Wreh	23 April 2005		Princeton, United States	
Shot put	16.86 m	Jangy Addy	29 March 2008		Atlanta, United States	
Discus throw	47.08 m (Note: record set during decathlon competition)	Jangy Addy	30 June 2008		Eugene, United States	
Hammer throw	46.11 m	Dunstan Macauley	4 June 1964		Loughborough, United Kingdom	
Javelin throw	57.20 m (Note: record set during decathlon competition)	Jangy Addy	17 June 2011		Ratingen, Germany	
Javelin throw	58.75 m (Note: before Jangy Addy transferred to LBR)	Jangy Addy	11 May 2007		Tuscaloosa, United States	
Decathlon	8025 pts	Jangy Addy	29–30 June 2008		Eugene, United States	
Decathlon	100m / Long jump / Shot put / High jump / 400m / 110m H / Discus / Pole vault / Javelin / 1500m; 10.77 / 7.20 m / 15.63 m / 196 m / 48.61 / 13.73 / 47.08 m / 4.40 m / 57.10 m / 5:05.07					
20 km walk (road)						
50 km walk (road)						
4 × 100 m relay	39.77	Liberia; Kouty Mawenh; Sayon Cooper; Andrew Reyes; Koiyan Morlu	29 September 2000	Olympic Games	Sydney, Australia	
4 × 100 m relay	38.73	Liberia; John Sherman; Emmanuel Matadi; Jabez Reeves; Joseph Fahnbulleh	20 March 2024	African Games	Accra, Ghana	
4 × 100 m relay	38.65	Liberia; Emmanuel Matadi; Akeem Sirleaf; Jabez Reeves; Joseph Fahnbulleh	5 May 2024	World Relays	Nassau, Bahamas	
4 × 400 m relay	3:09.25	Liberia; Bobby Young; Marvin Lewis; Rohan Richards; Augustine Schmader	14 June 2005		Burnaby, Canada	

=== Women ===
Event	Record	Athlete	Date	Meet	Place	Ref.
100 m	11.34 (−3.0 m/s)	Ada Udaya	10 May 2014	NEICAAA Championships	Westfield, United States	
100 m	10.91 (+0.6 m/s)	Thelma Davies	24 June 2025	Ostrava Golden Spike	Ostrava, Czech Republic	
200 m	23.27 (+1.0 m/s)	Kia Davis	17 May 2008	Ponce Grand Prix	Ponce, Puerto Rico	
300 m	36.71	Mariam Kromah	23 July 2016	American Track League	Houston, United States	
400 m	51.55	Kia Davis	17 May 2008	Ponce Grand Prix	Ponce, Puerto Rico	
800 m	2:01.89	Fatimoh Muhammed	9 June 2007		Sacramento, United States	
1500 m	4:22.31	Fatimoh Muhammed	29 April 2007		Sacramento, United States	
3000 m	9:58.73	Fatimoh Muhammed	15 March 2008		San Diego, United States	
5000 m						
10,000 m						
Marathon	2:50:10 dh	Monique Maddy	15 April 2002	Boston Marathon	Boston, United States	
100 m hurdles	12.74 (−0.2 m/s)	Ebony Morrison	1 August 2021	Olympic Games	Tokyo, Japan	
100 m hurdles	12.70 (+1.1 m/s)	Ebony Morrison	22 June 2024	African Championships	Douala, Cameroon	
300 m hurdles	44.50	Maya Neal	16 May 2013		Charleston, United States	
400 m hurdles	55.55	Kou Luogon	1 May 2009		Baie Mahault, France	
3000 m steeplechase						
High jump	1.60 m	Otricia Borkuah	27/31 December 2013		Monrovia, Liberia	
Pole vault						
Long jump	6.20 m	Decontee Kaye	11 May 2007		San Diego, United States	
Triple jump	13.52 m	Decontee Kaye	9 June 2007		Sacramento, United States	
Shot put	17.59 m	Anthonett Nabwe	23 May 2024	NCAA Division I West First Rounds	Fayetteville, United States	
Discus throw	59.58 m	Anthonett Nabwe	4 April 2026	Battle on the Bayou	Baton Rouge, United States	
Hammer throw	77.64 m	Anthonett Nabwe	23 April 2026	Drake Relays	Des Moines, United States	
Javelin throw	42.27 m (Note: by World Athletics source)	Lelica Zazaboi	2 July 2005		Québec, Canada	
Javelin throw	44.90 m A (Note: by LAF source)	Lelica Zazaboi	?		Albuquerque, United States	
Heptathlon	5443 pts	Maya Neal	11–12 May 2017	SEC Championships	Columbia, United States	
Heptathlon	100m H / High jump / Shot put / 200m / Long jump / Javelin / 800m; 14.19 (+3.7 m/s) / 1.59 m / 11.81 m / 24.85 (+1.3 m/s) / 5.90 m (+1.3 m/s) / 37.47 m / 2:22.66					
20 km walk (road)						
4 × 100 m relay	50.61	Liberia; A. Williams; Alice Tiklo; H. Grant; J. Binda	18 November 2006		Abuja, Nigeria	
4 × 100 m relay	43.15	Liberia; Symone Darius; Maia McCoy; Ebony Morrison; Destiny Smith-Barnett	4 May 2024	World Relays	Nassau, Bahamas	
4 × 400 m relay	3:33.24	Liberia; Phobay Kutu-Akoi; Raasin Mcintosh; Angele Cooper; Kou Luogon	1 July 2012	African Championships	Porto-Novo, Benin	

== Indoor ==
=== Men ===
Event	Record	Athlete	Date	Meet	Place	Ref.
50 m	5.78	Abraham Morlu	5 March 2010	Meeting Pas de Calais	Liévin, France	
55 m	6.26	Abraham Morlu	9 February 2007		Boone, United States	
60 m	6.55	Emmanuel Matadi	28 January 2022	G5 & Super 22 Invitational Championships	Houston, United States	
60 m	6.52	Emmanuel Matadi	12 February 2022	American Track League	Louisville, United States	
200 m	20.76	Akeem Sirleaf	9 February 2019	Tyson Invitational	Fayetteville, United States	
400 m	47.04	Siraj Williams	9 March 2007	NCAA Division I Championships	Fayetteville, United States	
800 m	1:56.08	Sheriff Flodavid Soclo	25 January 2020		Antequera, Spain	
800 m	1:53.62	Sheriff Flodavid Soclo	28 January 2023	Andalusian Championships	Antequera, Spain	
800 m	1:52.86	Sheriff Flodavid Soclo	4 February 2024	Spanish U23 Championships	Antequera, Spain	
800 m	1:46.96	Bobby True	6 March 1999	NCAA Division I Championships	Indianapolis, United States	
1500 m	4:02.52	Sheriff Flodavid Soclo	15 February 2020	Andalusian Championships	Antequera, Spain	
3000 m						
55 m hurdles	7.41	Wellington Zaza	7 January 2012	Hispanic Games	New York City, United States	
60 m hurdles	7.67	Jangy Addy	8 February 2008		New York City, United States	
60 m hurdles	7.61	Wellington Zaza	9 February 2022		Mondeville, France	
High jump	2.01 m	Jah Bennett	2 February 2008		Seattle, United States	
Pole vault	4.45 m	Jangy Addy	15 March 2008		Fayetteville, United States	
Long jump	7.87 m	Cadeau Kelley	29 January 2010		State College, United States	
Triple jump	16.60 m (Note: outdoor mark ratified as absolute record)	Tuan Wreh	11 February 2006		Ithaca, United States	
Shot put	15.80 m	Jangy Addy	14 March 2008		Fayetteville, United States	
Heptathlon	5836 pts	Jangy Addy	28 February–1 March 2008		Fayetteville, United States	
Heptathlon	60m / Long jump / Shot put / High jump / 60m H / Pole vault / 1000m; 6.88 / 7.32 m / 15.79 m / 1.96 m / 7.74 / 4.34 m / 3:01.18					
5000 m walk						
4 × 400 m relay	3:12.14	Liberia; Bobby Young; Hafiz Greigre; Marvin Lewis; Siraj Williams	9 March 2008	World Championships	Valencia, Spain	

=== Women ===
Event	Record	Athlete	Date	Meet	Place	Ref.
55 m	6.67+	Destiny Smith-Barnett	8 February 2025	Millrose Games	New York City, United States	
60 m	7.33	Ada Udaya	10 January 2015	Yale Collegiate Invitational	New Haven, United States	
200 m	23.42	Ada Udaya	28 February 2015	NEICAAA Championships	Boston, United States	
400 m	52.99	Kou Luogon	26 February 2006		Gainesville, United States	
400 m	52.92 OT	Kou Luogon	11 February 2006		Ames, United States	
600 m	1:42.53	Maya Neal	11 February 2017		Clemson, United States	
800 m	2:06.41	Fatimoh Muhammed	10 March 2007	NCAA Division I Championships	Fayetteville, United States	
800 m	2:05.70 OT	Fatimoh Muhammed	3 March 2007		Ames, United States	
1500 m						
3000 m	10:55.03	Eunice Jones	18 February 2012		Landover, United States	
55 m hurdles	8.18	Maya Neal	25 February 2012		Plainfield, United States	
60 m hurdles	8.12	Kia Davis	8 February 2008		New York City, United States	
60 m hurdles	8.09	Ebony Morrison	19 March 2022	World Championships	Belgrade, Serbia	
60 m hurdles	8.07	Ebony Morrison	19 March 2022	World Championships	Belgrade, Serbia	
High jump	1.61 m (Note: outdoor mark ratified as absolute record)	Maya Neal	19 January 2018	Clemson Invitational	Clemson, United States	
Pole vault						
Long jump	6.09 m A	Decontee Kaye	27 February 2009		Colorado Springs, United States	
Triple jump	13.32 m A	Decontee Kaye	28 February 2009		Colorado Springs, United States	
Shot put	14.09 m (Note: outdoor mark ratified as absolute record)	TeTee Kuyateh	3 March 2007		Boston, United States	
Weight throw	25.13 m	Anthonett Nabwe	13 March 2026	NCAA Division I Championships	Fayetteville, United States	
Pentathlon	3814 pts	Maya Neal	24 February 2018		College Station, United States	
Pentathlon	60m H / High jump / Shot put / Long jump / 800m; 8.72 / 1.58 m / 11.18 m / 5.89 m / 2:28.65					
3000 m walk						
4 × 400 m relay						
