= Liberia at the 2025 World Athletics Championships =

- Flag of Liberia
- WA code: LBR

in Tokyo, Japan 13 September 2025 – 21 September 2025
- Competitors: 3 (1 man and 2 women)
- Medals: Gold 0 Silver 0 Bronze 0 Total 0

World Athletics Championships appearances
- 1993; 1995; 1997; 1999; 2001; 2003; 2005; 2007; 2009; 2011; 2013; 2015; 2017; 2019; 2022; 2023; 2025

Liberia competed at the 2025 World Athletics Championships in Tokyo, Japan, from 13 to 21 September 2025.

== Results ==
Liberia entered 3 athletes.

Key

- Q = Qualified for the next round
- q = Qualified for the next round as a fastest loser or, in field events, by position without achieving the qualifying target
- NR = National record
- PB = Personal best
- SB = Season best
- N/A = Round not applicable for the event

=== Men ===
Track and road events

Athlete	Event	Heat		Semifinal		Final	
Athlete	Event	Result	Rank	Result	Rank	Result	Rank
Joseph Fahnbulleh	200 metres	20.73	6	Did not advance			

=== Women ===
Track and road events

Athlete	Event	Heat		Semifinal		Final	
Athlete	Event	Result	Rank	Result	Rank	Result	Rank
Thelma Davies	100 metres	11.12	3 Q	11.24	7	Did not advance	
Thelma Davies	200 metres	22.76	2 Q	23.00	6	Did not advance	
Destiny Smith-Barnett	100 metres	11.33	5	Did not advance			
