= Liberia at the 2004 Summer Olympics =

- IOC code: LBR
- NOC: Liberia National Olympic Committee

in Athens
- Competitors: 2 in 1 sport
- Flag bearer: Christopher Sayeh
- Medals: Gold 0 Silver 0 Bronze 0 Total 0

Summer Olympics appearances (overview)
- 1956; 1960; 1964; 1968; 1972; 1976; 1980; 1984; 1988; 1992; 1996; 2000; 2004; 2008; 2012; 2016; 2020; 2024

Liberia competed at the 2004 Summer Olympics in Athens, Greece, from 13 to 29 August 2004.

== History ==
Clemenceau Urey began serving as the president of the Liberia National Olympic Committee (LNOC) in 2000. In late 2003, Urey was impeached as president and expelled as a member by the executive committee. This was following the misuse of aid money from the International Olympic Committee (IOC). The misuse of funds triggered mutual accusations of financial impropriety between Urey and the executive committee. By June 2004, a group of Liberian athletes threatened to boycott that year's Summer Olympics if Urey wasn't reinstated as LNOC president. The group was led by Kouty Mawenh, Sayon Cooper, and Bill Rogers. Mawenh also served as a liaison between the IOC and LNOC. In the 2004 Summer Olympics, Liberia would ultimately only present two competitors, one man and one woman. Mawenh would attribute the lack of Liberian representation to Urey's removal.

== Athletics ==
Liberian athletes have so far achieved qualifying standards in the following athletics events (up to a maximum of 3 athletes in each event at the 'A' Standard, and 1 at the 'B' Standard).

Men

Athlete	Event	Heat		Quarterfinal		Semifinal		Final	
Athlete	Event	Result	Rank	Result	Rank	Result	Rank	Result	Rank
Sultan Tucker	110 m hurdles	13.76	5	did not advance					

Women

Athlete	Event	Heat		Quarterfinal		Semifinal		Final	
Athlete	Event	Result	Rank	Result	Rank	Result	Rank	Result	Rank
Gladys Thompson	200 m	27.51	7	did not advance					

Key

- Note–Ranks given for track events are within the athlete's heat only
- Q = Qualified for the next round
- q = Qualified for the next round as a fastest loser or, in field events, by position without achieving the qualifying target
- NR = National record
- N/A = Round not applicable for the event
- Bye = Athlete not required to compete in round
