= Clemenceau Urey =

Liberian businessman

President of the Liberia National Olympic Committee
- In office 2000–2003

Chairman of the Board of the National Oil Company of Liberia
- In office 2006–2012
- Appointed by: Ellen Johnson Sirleaf

Personal details
- Born: Clemenceau Blayon Urey; 1947 or 1948
- Party: Unity Party
- Occupation: Businessman, politician

Clemenceau Blayon Urey Sr. (born 1947 or 1948) is a Liberian businessman and politician. He served as president of the Liberia National Olympic Committee from 2000 to his expulsion in 2003. A member of the Unity Party, he unsuccessfully ran for the Senate in 2005 and 2009. Between 2006 and 2012, he was chairman of the board of directors of the National Oil Company of Liberia. He faced an indictment in 2014 due to bribery, among other accusations, during his time as chairman but the charges were dropped.

== Biography ==
Clemenceau Urey was born in either 1947 or 1948. He studied in the United States, receiving two master's degrees.

Urey began serving as the president of the Liberia National Olympic Committee (LNOC) in 2000. In late 2003, Urey was impeached as president and expelled as a member by the executive committee. This was following the misuse of aid money from the International Olympic Committee (IOC). The misuse of funds triggered mutual accusations of financial impropriety between Urey and the executive committee. By June 2004, a group of Liberian athletes threatened to boycott that year's Summer Olympics if Urey was not reinstated as LNOC president. The group was led by Kouty Mawenh, Sayon Cooper, and Bill Rogers. In the 2004 Olympics, Liberia would ultimately only present two competitors, one man and one woman. Mawenh would attribute the lack of Liberian representation to Urey's removal.

Urey ran to represent Montserrado County in the Senate in the 2005 election. He ran on the Unity Party (UP) ticket. He would come in third place, behind the two victors. Senator Hannah Brent died in 2009, triggering a by-election that year. Urey, then serving as First Vice President of the UP, was nominated by the party. In the by-election, held November 10, Urey would come in second place to Congress for Democratic Change (CDC) nominee Geraldine Doe-Sheriff, though Doe-Sheriff won less than 50% of the vote, triggering a run-off election. In the November 24 run-off election, Urey was defeated by Doe-Sheriff.

During the 2011 presidential run-off election, Urey urged the CDC not to boycott the election.

By 2006, Urey was appointed by President Ellen Johnson Sirleaf to serve as chairman of the board of directors of the National Oil Company of Liberia (NOCAL). He retired as chairman and from the board of directors in 2012. In February 2014, Urey was among four officials to speak during a hearing conducted by a joint committee of the Legislature of Liberia. This was in response to an audit report which indicated financial irregularities during his chairmanship. Urey confirmed that the board paid US$50,000 in lobbying fees to legislators, borrowing the money from the Liberia Petroleum Refining Company to lobby the legislature for oil contracts. The actions admitted to amounted to bribery under Liberian law, as the lobbying fees were paid to legislators directly.

In July 2014, the Liberia Anti-Corruption Commission (LACC) announced it had forwarded the corruption cases against Urey and others to the Ministry of Justice. By March 2015, Urey, among other NOCAL officials, was indicted by the LACC. The group was charged with, as reported by FrontPage Africa, "bribery, misapplication of entrusted properties, criminal facilitation, criminal conspiracy and economic sabotage". Urey's lawyers would request a separate trial for Urey. The motion failed. The court would ultimately drop the cases, due to statute of limitations.

Urey became a member of the Lions Club in 1986. He was a member of the Greater Monrovia Lions Club and served as president of the club from 2006 to 2007. In 2022, at a congress held in Abidjan, Ivory Coast, Urey was elected 2nd Vice Governor of District 403-A2. District 403-A2 comprises the countries of Liberia, Sierra Leone, Ivory Coast, and Togo. In April 2024, in Lomé, Togo, Urey was elected as the first Liberian district governor in Lions Club International history.

Urey is founder and CEO of the Atlantic Life and General Insurance Company.

== See also ==
- Unity Party
- Liberia National Olympic Committee
