= Liberia at the 2008 Summer Olympics =

- IOC code: LBR
- NOC: Liberia National Olympic Committee

in Beijing
- Competitors: 3 in 1 sport
- Flag bearer: Jangy Addy
- Medals: Gold 0 Silver 0 Bronze 0 Total 0

Summer Olympics appearances (overview)
- 1956; 1960; 1964; 1968; 1972; 1976; 1980; 1984; 1988; 1992; 1996; 2000; 2004; 2008; 2012; 2016; 2020; 2024

Liberia was represented at the 2008 Summer Olympics in Beijing, China by the Liberia National Olympic Committee.

In total, three athletes including two men and one woman represented Liberia in one sport: athletics.

== Background ==
Lesotho made their Olympic debut at the 1956 Summer Olympics in Melbourne, Victoria, Australia. After missing the 1992 Summer Olympics in Barcelona, Spain, Lesotho had appeared at every summer games. The 2008 Summer Olympics in Beijing, China marked the country's 11th appearance at the Summer Olympics.

== Competitors ==
In total, three athletes represented Liberia at the 2008 Summer Olympics in Beijing, China across one sport.

Sport	Men	Women	Total
Athletics	2	1	3
Total	2	1	3

== Athletics ==
In total, three Liberian athletes participated in the athletics events – Jangy Addy in the decathlon, Kia Davis in the women's 200 m and the women's 400 m and Siraj Williams in the men's 400 m.

The athletics events took place at the Beijing National Stadium in Chaoyang, Beijing from 15 to 24 August 2008.

The heats for the men's 400 m took place on 18 August 2008. Williams finished eighth in his heat in a time of 47.89 seconds and he did not advance to the semi-finals.

Athlete	Event	Heat		Semifinal		Final	
Athlete	Event	Result	Rank	Result	Rank	Result	Rank
Siraj Williams	400 m	47.89	8	did not advance			

The decathlon took place on 21 and 22 August 2008. Across the 10 events, Addy scored a total of 7,665 points and finished in 19th place overall.

Athlete	Event	100 m	LJ	SP	HJ	400 m	110H	DT	PV	JT	1500 m	Final	Rank
Jangy Addy	Result	10.76	7.38	14.91	1.93	48.51	14.31	42.30	4.20	52.50	5:12.22	7665 NR	19
Jangy Addy	Points	915	905	784	740	885	935	711	673	626	491	7665 NR	19

The heats for the women's 400 m took place on 16 August 2008. Davis finished seventh in her heat in a time of 53.99 seconds and she did not advance to the semi-finals.

The heats for the women's 200 m took place on 19 August 2008. Davis finished sixth in her heat in a time of 24.31 seconds and she did not advance to the quarter-finals.

Athlete	Event	Heat		Quarterfinal		Semifinal		Final	
Athlete	Event	Result	Rank	Result	Rank	Result	Rank	Result	Rank
Kia Davis	200 m	24.31	6	did not advance					
Kia Davis	400 m	53.99	7	—N/a		did not advance			
