= Liberia at the 2020 Summer Olympics =

- Flag of Liberia
- IOC code: LBR
- NOC: Liberia National Olympic Committee

in Tokyo, Japan July 23, 2021 – August 8, 2021
- Competitors: 3 in 1 sport
- Flag bearers (opening): Ebony Morrison; Joseph Fahnbulleh
- Flag bearer (closing): N/A
- Medals: Gold 0 Silver 0 Bronze 0 Total 0

Summer Olympics appearances (overview)
- 1956; 1960; 1964; 1968; 1972; 1976; 1980; 1984; 1988; 1992; 1996; 2000; 2004; 2008; 2012; 2016; 2020; 2024

Liberia competed at the 2020 Summer Olympics in Tokyo. Originally scheduled to take place from 24 July to 9 August 2020, the Games have been postponed to 23 July to 8 August 2021, because of the COVID-19 pandemic. It was the nation's thirteenth appearance at the Olympics since its debut in 1956, except for three occasions. Liberia failed to register any athletes at both the 1968 and 1992 Summer Olympics, and also joined the rest of the African nations to boycott the 1976 Summer Olympics in Montreal.

== Competitors ==
The following is the list of number of competitors in the Games.

Sport	Men	Women	Total
Athletics	2	1	3
Total	2	1	3

== Athletics ==
Liberian athletes achieved the entry standards, either by qualifying time or by world ranking, in the following track and field events (up to a maximum of 3 athletes in each event):

Key

- Note–Ranks given for track events are within the athlete's heat only
- Q = Qualified for the next round
- q = Qualified for the next round as a fastest loser or, in field events, by position without achieving the qualifying target
- NR = National record
- N/A = Round not applicable for the event
- Bye = Athlete not required to compete in round

Track & road events

Athlete	Event	Heat		Quarterfinal		Semifinal		Final	
Athlete	Event	Result	Rank	Result	Rank	Result	Rank	Result	Rank
Emmanuel Matadi	Men's 100 m	Bye		10.25	5	Did not advance			
Emmanuel Matadi	Men's 200 m	DNS		—		Did not advance			
Joseph Fahnbulleh	Men's 200 m	20.46	2 Q	—		19.99 NR	2 Q	19.98 NR	5
Ebony Morrison	Women's 100 m hurdles	—		13.00	6 q	12.74 NR	6	Did not advance	

== See also ==
- Liberia at the 2019 African Games
