= Liberia at the 1984 Summer Olympics =

- IOC code: LBR
- NOC: Liberia National Olympic Committee

in Los Angeles
- Competitors: 7
- Flag bearer: Wallace Obey
- Medals: Gold 0 Silver 0 Bronze 0 Total 0

Summer Olympics appearances (overview)
- 1956; 1960; 1964; 1968; 1972; 1976; 1980; 1984; 1988; 1992; 1996; 2000; 2004; 2008; 2012; 2016; 2020; 2024

Liberia competed at the 1984 Summer Olympics in Los Angeles, United States.

== Results by event ==
=== Athletics ===
Men's 200 metres

- Augustus Moulton

- Heat — 22.94 (→ did not advance)

Men's 400 metres

- Samuel Sarkpa

- Heat — 47.65 (→ did not advance)

Men's 5,000 metres

- Nimley Twegbe

- Heat — 17:36.69 (→ did not advance)

Men's Marathon

- Nimley Twegbe — did not finish (→ no ranking)

Women's 100 metres

- Grace Ann Dinkins

- First Heat — 12.35s (→ did not advance)
