= Liberia at the Olympics =

- IOC code: LBR
- NOC: Liberia National Olympic Committee
- Medals: Gold 0 Silver 0 Bronze 0 Total 0

Summer appearances
- 1956; 1960; 1964; 1968; 1972; 1976; 1980; 1984; 1988; 1992; 1996; 2000; 2004; 2008; 2012; 2016; 2020; 2024; 2028

Liberia has sent athletes to every Summer Olympic Games held since 1956 with the exception of 1968, 1976, 1980 and 1992. No athletes from Liberia have competed in any Winter Olympic Games.

As of the 2024 Summer Olympics, Liberia has yet to win a medal, with its best finish being 5th by sprinter Joseph Fahnbulleh at the men's 200 meters event at the 2020 games.

The National Olympic Committee for Liberia was formed in 1954 and recognized by the International Olympic Committee in 1955.

== Medal tables ==
=== Medals by Summer Games ===
Games	Athletes	Gold	Silver	Bronze	Total	Rank
1956 Melbourne	4	0	0	0	0	–
1960 Rome	4	0	0	0	0	–
1964 Tokyo	1	0	0	0	0	–
1968 Mexico City	did not participate					
1972 Munich	5	0	0	0	0	–
1976 Montreal	boycotted					
1980 Moscow	boycotted					
1984 Los Angeles	7	0	0	0	0	–
1988 Seoul	8	0	0	0	0	–
1992 Barcelona	did not participate					
1996 Atlanta	5	0	0	0	0	–
2000 Sydney	8	0	0	0	0	–
2004 Athens	2	0	0	0	0	–
2008 Beijing	3	0	0	0	0	–
2012 London	3	0	0	0	0	–
2016 Rio de Janeiro	2	0	0	0	0	–
2020 Tokyo	3	0	0	0	0	–
2024 Paris	8	0	0	0	0	–
2028 Los Angeles	future event					
2032 Brisbane	future event					
Total		0	0	0	0	–

== See also ==
- List of flag bearers for Liberia at the Olympics
- Liberia at the Paralympics
