= Liberia at the 1996 Summer Olympics =

- IOC code: LBR
- NOC: Liberia National Olympic Committee

in Atlanta
- Competitors: 5 in 1 sport
- Flag bearer: Kouty Mawenh
- Medals: Gold 0 Silver 0 Bronze 0 Total 0

Summer Olympics appearances (overview)
- 1956; 1960; 1964; 1968; 1972; 1976; 1980; 1984; 1988; 1992; 1996; 2000; 2004; 2008; 2012; 2016; 2020; 2024

Liberia competed at the 1996 Summer Olympics in Atlanta, United States. Several athletes competed in running races, but none advanced to medal rounds.

== Competitors ==
The following is the list of number of competitors in the Games.

Sport	Men	Women	Total
Athletics	4	1	5
Total	4	1	5

== Results by event ==
=== Athletics ===
==== Men ====
Track and road events

Athletes	Events	Heat Round 1		Heat Round 2		Semifinal		Final	
Athletes	Events	Time	Rank	Time	Rank	Time	Rank	Time	Rank
Sayon Cooper	100 metres	10.58	66	did not advance					
Robert Dennis	100 metres	10.65	72	did not advance					
Kouty Mawenh; Sayon Cooper; Eddie Neufville; Robert Dennis	4 x 100 metres relay	40.18	24	N/A		did not advance			

==== Women ====
Track and road events

Athletes	Events	Heat Round 1		Heat Round 2		Semifinal		Final	
Athletes	Events	Time	Rank	Time	Rank	Time	Rank	Time	Rank
Grace Ann Dinkins	400 metres	51.83	13 Q	52.53	28	did not advance			
