= Liberia at the 2022 World Athletics Championships =

- Flag of Liberia
- WA code: LBR

in Eugene, United States 15 July 2022 – 24 July 2022
- Competitors: 4 (3 men and 1 woman)
- Medals: Gold 0 Silver 0 Bronze 0 Total 0

World Athletics Championships appearances
- 1993; 1995; 1997; 1999; 2001; 2003; 2005; 2007; 2009; 2011; 2013; 2015; 2017; 2019; 2022; 2023

Liberia competed at the 2022 World Athletics Championships in Eugene, United States, from 15 to 24 July 2022.

== Results ==
Liberia has entered 4 athletes.

Key

- Q = Qualified for the next round
- q = Qualified for the next round as a fastest loser or, in field events, by position without achieving the qualifying target
- NR = National record
- PB = Personal best
- SB = Season best
- N/A = Round not applicable for the event

=== Men ===
Track and road events

Athlete	Event	Heat		Semi-final		Final	
Athlete	Event	Result	Rank	Result	Rank	Result	Rank
Emmanuel Matadi	100 m	9.99	7 Q	10.12	10	Did not advance	
Joseph Fahnbulleh	200 m	20.12	6 Q	19.92	6 Q	19.84	4
Wellington Zaza	110 m hurdles	13.81	33	Did not advance			

=== Women ===
Track and road events

Athlete	Event	Heat		Semi-final		Final	
Athlete	Event	Result	Rank	Result	Rank	Result	Rank
Ebony Morrison	100 m hurdles	13.12	6	Did not advance			
