= Liberia at the 1988 Summer Olympics =

- IOC code: LBR
- NOC: Liberia National Olympic Committee

in Seoul
- Competitors: 8 in 2 sports
- Flag bearer: Samuel Birch
- Medals: Gold 0 Silver 0 Bronze 0 Total 0

Summer Olympics appearances (overview)
- 1956; 1960; 1964; 1968; 1972; 1976; 1980; 1984; 1988; 1992; 1996; 2000; 2004; 2008; 2012; 2016; 2020; 2024

Liberia competed at the 1988 Summer Olympics in Seoul, South Korea. They had a very poor showing, despite their magnificent send-off. Two members of the official delegation were assaulted upon their return because of the perceived embarrassment suffered by the nation at their expense.

== Competitors ==
The following is the list of number of competitors in the Games.

| Sport | Men | Women | Total |
|---|---|---|---|
| Athletics | 3 | 1 | 4 |
| Boxing | 4 | – | 4 |
| Total | 7 | 1 | 8 |

== Athletics ==
Men
Track and road events

| Athlete | Event | Heat Round 1 | | Heat Round 2 | | Semifinal | | Final | |
| Athlete | Event | Time | Rank | Time | Rank | Time | Rank | Time | Rank |
|---|---|---|---|---|---|---|---|---|---|
| Samuel Birch | 100 metres | 11.68 | 101 | Did not advance | | | | | |
| Oliver Daniels | 100 metres | 10.68 | 54 | Did not advance | | | | | |
| Oliver Daniels | 200 metres | 21.59 | 39 Q | 22.25 | 39 | Did not advance | | | |
| Nimley Twegbe | 800 metres | 1:58.43 | 66 | Did not advance | | | | | |

Women
Track and road events

| Athlete | Event | Heat Round 1 | | Heat Round 2 | | Semifinal | | Final | |
| Athlete | Event | Time | Rank | Time | Rank | Time | Rank | Time | Rank |
|---|---|---|---|---|---|---|---|---|---|
| Melvina Vulah (Note: otherwise Melvina Wulah) | 100 metres | 12.16 | 51 | Did not advance | | | | | |
| Melvina Vulah | 200 metres | 25.46 | 51 | Did not advance | | | | | |

Field events

| Athlete | Event | Qualification | | Final | |
| Athlete | Event | Distance | Position | Distance | Position |
|---|---|---|---|---|---|
| Melvina Vulah | Long jump | 5.23 | 28 | Did not advance | |

== Boxing ==
| Athlete | Event | Round of 64 | Round of 32 | Round of 16 | Quarterfinals | Semifinals | Final | |
| Athlete | Event | Opposition Result | Opposition Result | Opposition Result | Opposition Result | Opposition Result | Opposition Result | Rank |
|---|---|---|---|---|---|---|---|---|
| Sammy Stewart | Light flyweight | Bye | Angeles (HON); W 5–0 | Serantes (PHI); L 0–5 | Did not advance | | | |
| Thomas Stephens | Bantamweight | Chikwanda (ZAM); L RSC R1 | Did not advance | | | | | |
| Tommy Gbay | Lightweight | Bye | Marjouane (MAR); L 0–5 | Did not advance | | | | |
| Simeon Stubblefield | Middleweight | Bye | Mojela (LES); L 0–5 | Did not advance | | | | |
