= Liberia at the 2024 Summer Olympics =

- Flag of Liberia
- IOC code: LBR
- NOC: Liberia National Olympic Committee

in Paris, France 26 July 2024 – 11 August 2024
- Competitors: 7 (4 men and 3 women) in 1 sport
- Flag bearers (opening): Thelma Davies; Emmanuel Matadi
- Flag bearer (closing): John Sherman
- Medals: Gold 0 Silver 0 Bronze 0 Total 0

Summer Olympics appearances (overview)
- 1956; 1960; 1964; 1968; 1972; 1976; 1980; 1984; 1988; 1992; 1996; 2000; 2004; 2008; 2012; 2016; 2020; 2024

Liberia competed at the 2024 Summer Olympics in Paris from 26 July to 11 August 2024. It was the nation's fourteenth appearance at the Olympics since its debut in 1956, except for three occasions. 1968 and 1992 are two editions when Liberia failed to register any athletes, while in 1976 in Montreal, the nation joined the rest of the African nations to boycott.

== Competitors ==
The following is the list of number of competitors in the Games.

Sport	Men	Women	Total
Athletics	4	3	7
Total	4	3	7

== Athletics ==
Liberian track and field athletes achieved the entry standards for Paris 2024, either by passing the direct qualifying mark (or time for track and road races) or by world ranking, in the following events (a maximum of 3 athletes each):

Key

- Note–Ranks given for track events are within the athlete's heat only
- Q = Qualified for the next round
- q = Qualified for the next round as a fastest loser or, in field events, by position without achieving the qualifying target
- NR = National record
- N/A = Round not applicable for the event
- Bye = Athlete not required to compete in round

Track and road events

Athlete	Event	Heat		Repechage		Semifinal		Final	
Athlete	Event	Result	Rank	Result	Rank	Result	Rank	Result	Rank
Emmanuel Matadi	Men's 100 m	10.08	4 q	—		10.18	8	Did not advance	
Joseph Fahnbulleh	Men's 200 m	20.20	1 Q	Bye		20.12	2 Q	20.15	7
Thelma Davies	Women's 100 m	12.05	9	Did not advance					
Destiny Smith-Barnett	Women's 100 m	11.99	8	Did not advance					
Ebony Morrison	Women's 100 m hurdles	12.93	6 R	12.82	1 Q	DQ		Did not advance	
Joseph Fahnbulleh; Emmanuel Matadi; Jabez Reeves; John Sherman	Men's 4 × 100 m relay	38.97	7	—				Did not advance	
