= Athletics at the 2020 Summer Olympics – Men's 200 metres =

Men's 200 metres at the Games of the XXXII Olympiad
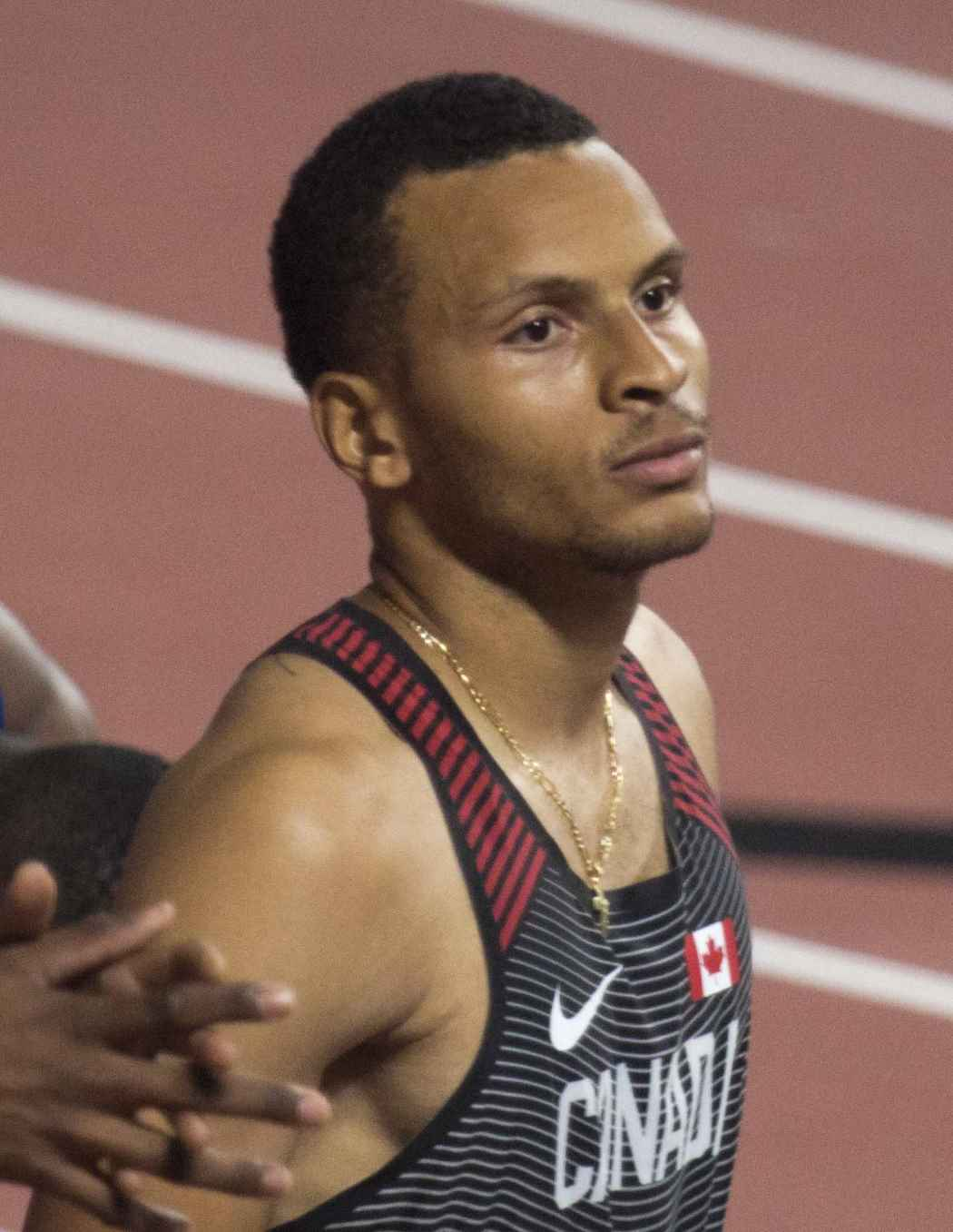
- Gold medalist Andre De Grasse
- Venue: Olympic Stadium
- Dates: 3 August 2021 (quarterfinals & semifinals); 4 August 2021 (final)
- Competitors: 48 from 33 nations
- Winning time: 19.62

Medalists
1st place, gold medalist(s)		Andre De Grasse	Canada
2nd place, silver medalist(s)		Kenneth Bednarek	United States
3rd place, bronze medalist(s)		Noah Lyles	United States

Official Video Highlights

The men's 200 metres event at the 2020 Summer Olympics took place on 3 and 4 August 2021 at the Olympic Stadium in Tokyo, Japan. 48 athletes from 33 nations competed, including five universality places (one universality place was used in 2016). Canada earned its first gold medal in the event since 1928 and third overall, as Andre De Grasse added gold to his 2016 silver to become the 12th man to earn multiple medals in the 200 metres. Kenneth Bednarek and Noah Lyles, both of the United States, took silver and bronze as Americans reached the podium for the first time since 2008 (where they coincidentally also won two medals: a silver, and a bronze). Jamaica's three-Games gold medal streak in the event ended, with Usain Bolt having retired.

== Summary ==
As the reigning World Champion, Noah Lyles came in as the favorite, but he was challenged in the US Trials by Kenny Bednarek and 17 year old Erriyon Knighton. Lyles left Eugene with the fastest time of the year. Andre De Grasse was the returning silver medalist. Adam Gemili, Alonso Edward, and Ramil Guliyev returned from five years earlier, but only De Grasse was able to qualify out of the semi-final round and he did so in style, breaking his own Canadian Record set in the semi-finals of the 2016 Olympics. This time too, he was eased up looking back at Bednarek in the last stages of this race. The second semi produced drama as Aaron Brown took an early lead with a fast start. Lyles passed him with his typical speed coming off the turn, then eased up to save energy at the finish allowing Brown to catch him at the line. Surprising both of them was another American high schooler, Joseph Fahnbulleh running for Liberia, coming from well off the pace to pip Lyles at the line. All three were timed in 19.99, a new Liberian Record. The favorite, Lyles in third, had to rely on time to get into the final.

In the final, De Grasse reacted fastest and his Canadian teammate Brown got a good start, both of them making up ground on the stagger of the Americans to their outside, Bednarek and 17 year old Erriyon Knighton, respectively. Through the second half of the turn, Bednarek and Lyles asserted themselves to hit the straightaway together with a slight lead. This is where Lyles usually shined but he did not show the same dominating top-end speed coming off the turn. De Grasse ended the turn slightly behind, but came back to battle Bednarek next to him and Lyles across the track. Knighton passed Brown but it was De Grasse who had the closing speed, passing and opening up a small gap on Bednarek. In the last 20 metres, Bednarek narrowed the gap to De Grasse slightly, but it was a clear win for De Grasse, who was timed in 19.62 into a −0.5 mps wind.

With his score, De Grasse finally moved into the top 10 of all-time in the 200m, a status foretold six years earlier with a wind-aided 19.58 while competing for the University of Southern California. Bednarek, in second, ran 19.68 to claim a tie with Frankie Fredericks (second behind Michael Johnson at the 1996 Olympics). Fahnbulleh came from dead last to reach 19.98, improving his Liberian national record. 17 year old Knighton finished fourth, setting an American age record. It was the first time in the Olympic history that five men dipped below 20 seconds in an Olympic 200m final.

== Background ==
This was the 28th time the event was held; it was not held at the first 1896 Olympics but has been on the program ever since.

Brunei made its men's 200 metres debut. The United States made its 27th appearance in the event, most of any nation, having missed only the boycotted 1980 Games.

== Qualification ==
A National Olympic Committee (NOC) could enter up to three qualified athletes in the men's 200 metres event if all athletes meet the entry standard or qualify by ranking during the qualifying period. (The limit of three has been in place since the 1930 Olympic Congress.) The qualifying standard is 20.24 seconds. This standard was "set for the sole purpose of qualifying athletes with exceptional performances unable to qualify through the IAAF World Rankings pathway." The world rankings, based on the average of the best five results for the athlete over the qualifying period and weighted by the importance of the meet, will then be used to qualify athletes until the cap of 56 is reached.

The qualifying period was originally from 1 May 2019 to 29 June 2020. Due to the COVID-19 pandemic, the period was suspended from 6 April 2020 to 30 November 2020, with the end date extended to 29 June 2021. The world rankings period start date was also changed from 1 May 2019 to 30 June 2020; athletes who had met the qualifying standard during that time were still qualified, but those using world rankings would not be able to count performances during that time. The qualifying time standards could be obtained in various meets during the given period that have the approval of the IAAF. Only outdoor meets were eligible for the sprints and short hurdles, including the 200 metres. The most recent Area Championships may be counted in the ranking, even if not during the qualifying period.

NOCs can also use their universality place—each NOC can enter one male athlete regardless of time if they had no male athletes meeting the entry standard for an athletics event—in the 200 metres.

Entry number: 56.

Qualification standard	No. of athletes	NOC	Nominated athletes
Entry standard – 20.24	3	Great Britain	~~Miguel Francis~~; Adam Gemili; ~~Zharnel Hughes~~
Entry standard – 20.24	2	Jamaica	Rasheed Dwyer; Julian Forte
Entry standard – 20.24	3	United States	Kenny Bednarek; Erriyon Knighton; Noah Lyles
Entry standard – 20.24	2	Canada	Aaron Brown; Andre De Grasse
Entry standard – 20.24	1	Ghana	Joseph Amoah; ~~Benjamin Azamati-Kwaku~~
Entry standard – 20.24	2	South Africa	Shaun Maswanganyi; Clarence Munyai
Entry standard – 20.24	2	Trinidad and Tobago	Kyle Greaux; Jereem Richards
Entry standard – 20.24	1	Bahamas	Steven Gardiner
Entry standard – 20.24	1	Barbados	Mario Burke
Entry standard – 20.24	1	Botswana	Isaac Makwala
Entry standard – 20.24	1	Brazil	Aldemir da Silva Júnior
Entry standard – 20.24	1	China	Xie Zhenye
Entry standard – 20.24	1	Colombia	Bernardo Baloyes
Entry standard – 20.24	1	Dominican Republic	Yancarlos Martínez
Entry standard – 20.24	1	Ecuador	Álex Quiñónez
Entry standard – 20.24	1	Liberia	Joseph Fahnbulleh
Entry standard – 20.24	1	Japan	Abdul Hakim Sani Brown
Entry standard – 20.24	1	Nigeria	Divine Oduduru
Entry standard – 20.24	1	Panama	Alonso Edward
Entry standard – 20.24	1	Switzerland	Alex Wilson
Entry standard – 20.24	1	Turkey	Ramil Guliyev
Entry standard – 20.24	1	Zambia	Sydney Siame
World ranking	2	Brazil	Jorge Vides; Lucas Vilar
World ranking	2	Ireland	Marcus Lawler; Leon Reid
World ranking	2	Italy	Fausto Desalu; Antonio Infantino
World ranking	2	Japan	Shota Iizuka; Jun Yamashita
World ranking	1	Belgium	Robin Vanderbemden
World ranking	1	Canada	Brendon Rodney
World ranking	1	Czech Republic	Jan Jirka
World ranking	1	Germany	Steven Müller
World ranking	1	Great Britain	Nethaneel Mitchell-Blake
World ranking	1	Liberia	Emmanuel Matadi
World ranking	1	Lithuania	Gediminas Truskauskas
World ranking	1	Netherlands	Taymir Burnet
World ranking	1	Slovakia	Ján Volko
World ranking	1	South Africa	Anaso Jobodwana
World ranking	1	Switzerland	William Reais
World ranking	1	Ukraine	Serhiy Smelyk
Universality Places	1	Brunei	Muhd Noor Firdaus Ar-Rasyid
Universality Places	1	Cameroon	Emmanuel Eseme
Universality Places	1	El Salvador	José Andrés Salazar
Universality Places	1	Eswatini	Sibusiso Matsenjwa
Universality Places	1	Lebanon	Noureddine Hadid
Total	56		

Withdrawn after qualification by standard or ranking: Miguel Francis, Benjamin Azamati-Kwaku, Zharnel Hughes, Christophe Lemaitre, Mouhamadou Fall, Méba-Mickaël Zeze, Jeffrey John, Paulo André de Oliveira.

Of the finalists from the 2016 Games:

- Three-time gold medalist Usain Bolt retired and did not return.
- Silver medalist Andre De Grasse qualified.
- Bronze medalist Christophe Lemaitre qualified but withdrawn.
- Fourth-place finisher Adam Gemili qualified.
- Fifth-place finisher Churandy Martina did qualify.
- Sixth-place finisher LaShawn Merritt was not selected through US trials.
- Seventh-place finisher Alonso Edward of Panama qualified.
- Eight-place finisher Ramil Guliyev qualified.

== Competition format ==
The event continued to use the three rounds format introduced in 2012. There were 7 heats, with the top 3 runners in each heat and the next 3 overall advancing to the semifinals. There were 3 semifinals, with the top 2 in each semifinal and next 2 overall advancing to the final.

== Records ==
Prior to this competition, the existing global and area records were as follows:

Global records before the 2020 Summer Olympics
Record	Athlete (Nation)	Time (s)	Location	Date
World record	Usain Bolt (JAM)	19.19	Berlin, Germany	20 August 2009
Olympic record	Usain Bolt (JAM)	19.30	Beijing, China	20 August 2008
World leading	Noah Lyles (USA)	19.74	Eugene, Oregon, United States	27 June 2021

Area records before the 2020 Summer Olympics
Area	Time (s)	Wind	Athlete	Nation
Africa (records)	19.68	+0.4	Frank Fredericks	Namibia
Asia (records)	19.88	+0.9	Xie Zhenye	China
Europe (records)	19.72^{[A]}	+1.8	Pietro Mennea	Italy
North, Central America and Caribbean (records)	19.19 WR	−0.3	Usain Bolt	Jamaica
Oceania (records)	20.06^{[A]}	+0.9	Peter Norman	Australia
South America (records)	19.81	−0.3	Alonso Edward	Panama

The following national records were established during the competition:

Country	Athlete	Round	Time	Notes
Dominican Republic	Yancarlos Martínez	Round 1	20.17	
Eswatini	Sibusiso Matsenjwa	Round 1	20.34	
Eswatini	Sibusiso Matsenjwa	Semifinals	20.22	
Liberia	Joseph Fahnbulleh	Semifinals	19.99	
Liberia	Joseph Fahnbulleh	Final	19.98	
Canada	Andre De Grasse	Semifinals	19.73	
Canada	Andre De Grasse	Final	19.62	

== Schedule ==
All times are Japan Standard Time (UTC+9)

The men's 200 metres took place over two consecutive days.

Date	Time	Round
Tuesday, 3 August 2021	9:00; 19:00	Quarterfinals; Semifinals
Wednesday, 4 August 2021	18:30	Final

== Results ==
=== Round 1 ===
Qualification Rules: First 3 in each heat (Q) and the next 3 fastest (q) advance to Semifinals.

==== Heat 1 ====
Rank	Lane	Athlete	Nation	Reaction	Time	Notes
1	7	Rasheed Dwyer	Jamaica	0.163	20.31	Q
2	8	Divine Oduduru	Nigeria	0.129	~~20.36~~^{[a]}	Q
3	4	Anaso Jobodwana	South Africa	0.119	20.78	Q
4	2	Jorge Vides	Brazil	0.161	20.94	
5	3	Fodé Sissoko	Mali	0.167	21.00	
6	5	Shōta Iizuka	Japan	0.148	21.02	
7	6	José Andrés Salazar	El Salvador	0.145	21.66	
				Wind: -0.3 m/s		

==== Heat 2 ====
Rank	Lane	Athlete	Nation	Reaction	Time	Notes
1	4	Jereem Richards	Trinidad and Tobago	0.187	20.52	Q
2	6	Shaun Maswanganyi	South Africa	0.142	20.58	Q
3	2	Taymir Burnet	Netherlands	0.137	20.60	Q, SB
4	3	Emmanuel Eseme	Cameroon	0.160	20.65	
5	7	Ján Volko	Slovakia	0.160	21.21	
6	5	Abdul Hakim Sani Brown	Japan	0.149	21.41	SB
—	9	Jan Jirka	Czech Republic	0.150	DQ	TR 17.3.1
—	8	Bernardo Baloyes	Colombia		DNS	
				Wind: +0.9 m/s		

==== Heat 3 ====
Rank	Lane	Athlete	Nation	Reaction	Time	Notes
1	5	Femi Ogunode	Qatar	0.154	20.37	Q
2	6	Ramil Guliyev	Turkey	0.158	20.54	Q
3	2	Andre De Grasse	Canada	0.122	20.56	Q
4	3	Kyle Greaux	Trinidad and Tobago	0.149	20.77	
5	4	Jun Yamashita	Japan	0.118	20.78	
6	8	Aldemir da Silva Júnior	Brazil	0.160	20.84	SB
				Wind: -0.6 m/s		

==== Heat 4 ====
Rank	Lane	Athlete	Nation	Reaction	Time	Notes
1	4	Erriyon Knighton	United States	0.173	20.55	Q
2	8	Alonso Edward	Panama	0.185	20.60	Q
3	5	Robin Vanderbemden	Belgium	0.142	20.70	Q, SB
4	6	Sydney Siame	Zambia	0.171	21.01	
5	2	Gediminas Truskauskas	Lithuania	0.140	21.02	
6	3	Steven Müller	Germany	0.156	21.08	
7	7	Adam Gemili	Great Britain	0.180	1:58.58	
				Wind: +0.6 m/s		

==== Heat 5 ====
Rank	Lane	Athlete	Nation	Reaction	Time	Notes
1	4	Aaron Brown	Canada	0.157	20.38	Q
2	2	Joseph Fahnbulleh	Liberia	0.147	20.46	Q
3	6	William Reais	Switzerland	0.147	20.51	Q
4	7	Serhiy Smelyk	Ukraine	0.144	20.53	SB
5	5	Antonio Infantino	Italy	0.132	20.90	
6	3	Lucas Vilar	Brazil	0.171	21.31	
7	8	Muhd Noor Firdaus Ar-Rasyid	Brunei	0.174	21.83	SB
				Wind: -0.7 m/s		

==== Heat 6 ====
Rank	Lane	Athlete	Nation	Reaction	Time	Notes
1	5	Kenneth Bednarek	United States	0.184	20.01	Q
2	8	Yancarlos Martínez	Dominican Republic	0.164	20.17	Q, NR
3	4	Fausto Desalu	Italy	0.131	20.29	Q, SB
4	2	Xie Zhenye	China	0.159	20.34	q, SB
5	3	Nethaneel Mitchell-Blake	Great Britain	0.163	20.56	SB
6	7	Marcus Lawler	Ireland	0.145	20.73	SB
	6	Emmanuel Matadi	Liberia			DNS
				Wind: -0.4 m/s		

==== Heat 7 ====
Rank	Lane	Athlete	Nation	Reaction	Time	Notes
1	8	Noah Lyles	United States	0.171	20.18	Q
2	9	Sibusiso Matsenjwa	Eswatini	0.172	20.34	Q, NR
3	3	Joseph Amoah	Ghana	0.171	20.35	Q, SB
4	4	Clarence Munyai	South Africa	0.135	20.49	q, =SB
5	5	Leon Reid	Ireland	0.135	20.53	q, SB
6	7	Brendon Rodney	Canada	0.150	20.60	
7	6	Julian Forte	Jamaica	0.152	20.65	
8	2	Noureddine Hadid	Lebanon	0.157	21.12	
				Wind: +0.4 m/s		

=== Semifinals ===
Qualification rules: First 2 in each heat (Q) and the next 2 fastest (q) advance to the final.

==== Semi-final 1 ====
Rank	Lane	Athlete	Nation	Reaction	Time	Notes
1	4	Erriyon Knighton	United States	0.172	20.02	Q
2	6	Rasheed Dwyer	Jamaica	0.141	20.13	Q, SB
3	7	Divine Oduduru	Nigeria	0.140	~~20.16~~^{[a]}	
4	9	Joseph Paul Amoah	Ghana	0.168	20.27	SB
5	5	Femi Ogunode	Qatar	0.160	20.34	
6	8	Fausto Desalu	Italy	0.149	20.43	
7	2	Xie Zhenye	China	0.154	20.45	
8	3	Anaso Jobodwana	South Africa	0.151	20.88	
				Wind: -0.2 m/s		

==== Semi-final 2 ====
Rank	Lane	Athlete	Nation	Reaction	Time	Notes
1	7	Aaron Brown	Canada	0.151	19.99 (19.982)	Q, SB
1	6	Joseph Fahnbulleh	Liberia	0.140	19.99 (19.982)	Q, NR
3	5	Noah Lyles	United States	0.179	19.99 (19.983)	q
4	4	Yancarlos Martínez	Dominican Republic	0.141	20.24	
5	8	William Reais	Switzerland	0.149	20.44	SB
6	2	Clarence Munyai	South Africa	0.142	20.49	=SB
7	3	Robin Vanderbemden	Belgium	0.132	21.00	
	9	Alonso Edward	Panama	0.147	DNF	
				Wind: -0.4 m/s		

==== Semi-final 3 ====
Rank	Lane	Athlete	Nation	Reaction	Time	Notes
1	9	Andre De Grasse	Canada	0.139	19.73	Q, NR
2	6	Kenneth Bednarek	United States	0.176	19.83	Q
3	5	Jereem Richards	Trinidad and Tobago	0.161	20.10	q, SB
4	8	Shaun Maswanganyi	South Africa	0.151	20.18	
5	7	Sibusiso Matsenjwa	Eswatini	0.158	20.22	NR
6	4	Ramil Guliyev	Turkey	0.156	20.31	SB
7	3	Leon Reid	Ireland	0.139	20.54	
8	2	Taymir Burnet	Netherlands	0.126	20.90	
				Wind: +0.2 m/s		

- ^{200 metres} Divine Oduduru of Nigeria was disqualified for doping violations.

=== Final ===
Rank	Lane	Athlete	Nation	Reaction	Time	Notes
1st place, gold medalist(s)	6	Andre De Grasse	Canada	0.135	19.62	NR
2nd place, silver medalist(s)	7	Kenneth Bednarek	United States	0.165	19.68	PB
3rd place, bronze medalist(s)	3	Noah Lyles	United States	0.151	19.74	=SB
4	5	Erriyon Knighton	United States	0.159	19.93	
5	8	Joseph Fahnbulleh	Liberia	0.141	19.98	NR
6	4	Aaron Brown	Canada	0.157	20.20	
7	9	Rasheed Dwyer	Jamaica	0.148	20.21	
8	2	Jereem Richards	Trinidad and Tobago	0.149	20.39	
				Wind: -0.5 m/s		
