= Liberia at the 2000 Summer Olympics =

- IOC code: LBR
- NOC: Liberia National Olympic Committee

in Sydney
- Competitors: 8 in 1 sport
- Flag bearer: Kouty Mawenh
- Medals: Gold 0 Silver 0 Bronze 0 Total 0

Summer Olympics appearances (overview)
- 1956; 1960; 1964; 1968; 1972; 1976; 1980; 1984; 1988; 1992; 1996; 2000; 2004; 2008; 2012; 2016; 2020; 2024

Liberia competed at the 2000 Summer Olympics in Sydney, Australia.

== Competitors ==
The following is the list of number of competitors in the Games.

Sport	Men	Women	Total
Athletics	6	2	8
Total	6	2	8

== Athletics ==
Key

- Note–Ranks given for track events are within the athlete's heat only
- Q = Qualified for the next round
- q = Qualified for the next round as a fastest loser or, in field events, by position without achieving the qualifying target
- NR = National record
- N/A = Round not applicable for the event
- Bye = Athlete not required to compete in round

Men
Track and road events

Athletes	Events	Heat Round 1		Heat Round 2		Semifinal		Final	
Athletes	Events	Time	Rank	Time	Rank	Time	Rank	Time	Rank
Sayon Cooper	100 metres	10.33	18 q	10.37	28	did not advance			
Sayon Cooper	200 metres	21.10	44	did not advance					
Bobby True	800 metres	1:48.79	45	N/A		did not advance			
Paul Sehzue	110 metres hurdles	14.18	32 Q	14.37	32	did not advance			
Kouty Mawenh; Sayon Cooper; Andrew Reyes; Koiyan Morlu	4 × 100 metres relay	39.77	27	—		did not advance			

Women
Track & road events

Athletes	Events	Heat Round 1		Heat Round 2		Semifinal		Final	
Athletes	Events	Time	Rank	Time	Rank	Time	Rank	Time	Rank
Grace Ann Dinkins	100 metres	11.79	52	did not advance					
Hannah Cooper	100 metres hurdles	13.51	30	did not advance					
