= Liberia at the 2016 Summer Olympics =

- IOC code: LBR
- NOC: Liberia National Olympic Committee

in Rio de Janeiro
- Competitors: 2 in 1 sport
- Flag bearer: Emmanuel Matadi
- Medals: Gold 0 Silver 0 Bronze 0 Total 0

Summer Olympics appearances (overview)
- 1956; 1960; 1964; 1968; 1972; 1976; 1980; 1984; 1988; 1992; 1996; 2000; 2004; 2008; 2012; 2016; 2020; 2024

Liberia competed at the 2016 Summer Olympics in Rio de Janeiro, Brazil, from 5 to 21 August 2016. This was the nation's twelfth appearance at the Olympics since its debut in 1956, except for four occasions. Liberia failed to register any athletes at both the 1968 and 1992 Summer Olympics, joined the rest of the African nations to boycott the 1976 Summer Olympics in Montreal, and joined the United States-led boycott of the 1980 Summer Olympics, withdrawing after the opening ceremony.

The Liberian team featured two track and field athletes at the Games: sprinters Mariam Kromah and Emmanuel Matadi, who was selected to carry the nation's flag in the opening ceremony. Liberia, however, has yet to win its first Olympic medal, as neither of the athletes passed the first round of their respective sporting events.

== Athletics (track and field) ==
Liberian athletes have so far achieved qualifying standards in the following athletics events (up to a maximum of 3 athletes in each event):

Key

- Note–Ranks given for track events are within the athlete's heat only
- Q = Qualified for the next round
- q = Qualified for the next round as a fastest loser or, in field events, by position without achieving the qualifying target
- NR = National record
- N/A = Round not applicable for the event
- Bye = Athlete not required to compete in round
- NM = No mark

Track & road events

Athlete	Event	Heat		Quarterfinal		Semifinal		Final	
Athlete	Event	Result	Rank	Result	Rank	Result	Rank	Result	Rank
Emmanuel Matadi	Men's 100 m	Bye		10.31	6	did not advance			
Emmanuel Matadi	Men's 200 m	20.49	5	—N/a		did not advance			
Mariam Kromah	Women's 400 m	52.79	5	—N/a		did not advance			
