= Liberia at the 2012 Summer Olympics =

- IOC code: LBR
- NOC: Liberia National Olympic Committee

in London
- Competitors: 4 in 2 sports
- Flag bearer: Phobay Kutu-Akoi
- Medals: Gold 0 Silver 0 Bronze 0 Total 0

Summer Olympics appearances (overview)
- 1956; 1960; 1964; 1968; 1972; 1976; 1980; 1984; 1988; 1992; 1996; 2000; 2004; 2008; 2012; 2016; 2020; 2024

Liberia competed at the 2012 Summer Olympics in London, United Kingdom from 27 July to 12 August 2012. This was the nation's eleventh appearance at the Olympics since its debut in 1956.

The team comprised four Liberians: three athletes, and for the first time, one judoka. Among these athletes, American-born decathlete Jangy Addy was the only one to compete at his second consecutive Olympics. Sprinter Phobay Kutu-Akoi, a psychology graduate from St. John's University in New York, was the nation's flag bearer at the opening ceremony. Liberia, however, was unable to win its first Olympic medal.

== Athletics ==
Liberian athletes have achieved qualifying standards in the following athletics events (up to a maximum of 3 athletes in each event at the 'A' Standard, and 1 at the 'B' Standard):

Key

- Note – Ranks given for track events are within the athlete's heat only
- Q = Qualified for the next round
- q = Qualified for the next round as a fastest loser or, in field events, by position without achieving the qualifying target
- NR = National record
- N/A = Round not applicable for the event
- Bye = Athlete not required to compete in round

Men
Combined events – Decathlon

Athlete	Event	100 m	LJ	SP	HJ	400 m	110H	DT	PV	JT	1500 m	Final	Rank
Jangy Addy	Result	10.89	6.90	14.97	1.93	48.64	14.23	45.61	4.20	50.36	5:08.14	7586	23
Jangy Addy	Points	885	790	788	740	878	945	779	673	594	514	7586	23

Women

Athlete	Event	Heat		Quarterfinal		Semifinal		Final	
Athlete	Event	Result	Rank	Result	Rank	Result	Rank	Result	Rank
Phobay Kutu-Akoi	100 m	Bye		11.52	6	Did not advance			
Raasin McIntosh	400 m hurdles	57.39	6	—		Did not advance			

== Judo ==
Liberia had 1 judoka invited, Liva Saryee. However, Saryee did not compete, as he received a bye in the first round and did not start in the second round. It later transpired that Saryee had been proposed for selection by the national judo federation despite never having taken part in any judo competition and being unfamiliar with the rules of the sport.

Men

Athlete	Event	Round of 32	Round of 16	Quarterfinals	Semifinals	Repechage	Final / BM	
Athlete	Event	Opposition Result	Opposition Result	Opposition Result	Opposition Result	Opposition Result	Opposition Result	Rank
Liva Saryee	Men's −81 kg	Attaf (MAR); L 0000–1000	Did not advance					
