= Dalal Mesfer Al-Harith =

Qatari sprinter

Dalal Mesfer Al-Harith (born November 28, 1999) is a Qatari sprinter. She competed at the 2016 Summer Olympics in the women's 400 metres race; her time of 1:07.12 in the heats did not qualify her for the semifinals.
