= 2009 Liberian by-elections =

The 2009 Liberian by-elections were held by mid February and on November 10 in River Gee County and Montserrado County respectively. Both elections were caused by deaths in the Senate and both resulted in run-off elections. The Montserrado County run-off election was held on November 24. The winners of the elections were Nathaniel J. Williams in River Gee and Geraldine Doe-Sheriff in Montserrado.

== Background ==
=== River Gee County ===
By mid November 2008, River Gee County Senator Isaac Nyenekarto Johnson of the Liberian Action Party (LAP) died. The Senate officially notified the National Elections Commission (NEC) of his death by December.

There were seven candidates in the election: Nathaniel J. Williams of the Liberia Destiny Party, Conmany B. Wesseh of the Unity Party, Hixenbaugh Kear Darbeh of the LAP, Patrick T. Dexter of the Congress for Democratic Change, Edmund B. Gibson Jr. of the National Patriotic Party, P. Tarpowah Dortu Kear of the Alliance for Peace and Democracy as well as independent candidate Jonathan Boy Charles Sogbie.

=== Montserrado County ===
Montserrado Senator Hannah G. Brent of the Congress for Democratic Change (CDC) died on August 3, 2009. The National Elections Commission (NEC) was notified of her death on September 1. The by-election to fill the vacancy left by Brent's death was slated for November 10. The 53rd Legislature had experienced the most deaths in Liberia's history, with there being two vacancies in the Senate filled before Brent's death. The Montserrado by-election was the largest of these by-elections, and the largest election the NEC conducted since the 2005 general election. Montserrado is Liberia's most populous county, with a high population density. This presented challenges for the NEC.

Out of eleven prospective candidates, there were ten candidates nominated for the Senate seat by October 14, when campaigning official began. One candidate was rejected by the NEC, Musu Ketter, as her check to pay registration fees bounced. By September, Francis Chu-Chu Horton was petitioned by the National Democratic Party of Liberia to run for the office, but he rejected the offer. Half of the candidates were nominated by political parties and the other half were independents.

At this time, the ruling Unity Party (UP) was going through a merger with the Liberian Action Party (LAP) and the Liberia Unification Party (LUP). The merger was announced on April 1, but it wouldn't be finalized until January 2010. On September 22, the political alliance selected its nominee. The two candidates in the running to be nominated were Clemenceau B. Urey of the UP, an insurance businessman who defeated George Kilando in the UP primary, and Meima Sirleaf Karneh of the LUP, assistant commerce minister. Urey was ultimately nominated as the UP candidate.

The opposition Congress for Democratic Change (CDC) nominated Geraldine Doe-Sheriff. By late October, the former ruling National Patriotic Party (NPP) announced its endorsement of Doe-Sheriff. This sparked division within the NPP, combined with the extended term of the party's leader, Theophelus Gould. The announcement of the endorsement was shortly followed by the resignation of a member of the NPP national executive committee, John T. Richardson, who served as national security advisor under President Charles Taylor. Benoni Urey, an NPP party executive, claimed that the endorsement was made without the consensus of the party's leadership. He further claimed the national executive committee had agreed not to endorse a candidate for the 2009 by-election. Benoni Urey threatened to resign from the party, as did fellow party executives Cyril Allen and Oscar Cooper.

Clemenceau Urey and Doe-Sheriff, along with the Liberty Party's (LP) Abraham Darius Dillon, were considered the election's front-runners. Other candidates were Jasper S. Fallah Ndaborlor of the Free Democratic Party and Wilson Kargeor Tarpeh of the Alliance for Peace and Democracy who was also backed by the Liberian People's Party. The independent candidates were Daniel G. Johnson, Grace Tee McGill Kpaan, Nathaniel Semoda Toe Jr., Jacqueline Maulyne Capehart, and Alhaji G.V. Kromah.

Two groups, the New Deal Movement and the National Students Intellectual Council Of Liberia, filed separate objections in regard to the candidacy of Kromah. Both objected on the grounds that he was an individual reported to have committed crimes against humanity in the civil war by the Truth and Reconciliation Commission. The NEC ruled that it was outside of its authority to rule on the criminal matter.

There was a debate held between all ten candidates in late October. Campaigning officially ended on November 8.

== Aftermath ==
=== River Gee County ===
The election was held by mid February. The results of the initial election showed Williams in the lead with 2,079 votes, 32.2% of the total, compared to Wesseh's 1,528. With no candidate earning 50% of the vote, a run-off election was held between the two top candidates. The run-off election saw Williams achieve victory with 3,498, 52.8% of the total.

=== Montserrado County ===
The by-election was held on November 10. It was marred by irregularities and mistakes by the NEC which garnered them criticism, including by President Ellen Johnson Sirleaf. Only a few of the polling centers opened on time. Voter turnout was low. This was due in part to voter apathy, as well as poor civic education prior to the election. It was reported some voters were confused about where to voter, as some precinct centers had been merged in preparation for the 2011 general election.

On November 11, preliminary results from 33 polling centers showed Urey ahead of Doe-Sheriff. By November 12, NEC Chairman James Fromayan claimed that he had received threats on his life from members of the CDC. CDC leader George Weah maintained that there had been cheating in the 2005 general election that cost him and his party the presidency. He had warned there would be consequences if such cheating happened again. The CDC denied that its members had threatened Fromayan.

The full results of the first round of the election were released by November 14. They showed Doe-Sheriff ahead of Urey. Doe-Sheriff did not receive over 50% of the vote, so a run-off election was triggered, scheduled for November 24. Fromayan had admitted that the election had not been conducted perfectly. By November 19, he had announced that the NEC was working with a group known as the Liberia Crusaders for Peace in an attempt spread civic education in hopes of increasing voter turnout for the second round of the election.

The second round was held on November 24. On November 26, Doe-Sheriff was announced as the winner by the NEC. She was certificated by the NEC on December 1. During the certification ceremony, NEC Chairman Fromayan repeated claims that he had been threatened by CDC members. CDC leader Weah quickly rebutted these claims and called for Fromayan's resignation due to his alleged bias against the CDC.

== Results ==
The following are the results for the 2009 by-elections from the NEC.

2009 River Gee County Senatorial By-election, Round 1
Candidate	Party	Votes	%
Nathaniel J. Williams	Liberia Destiny Party	2,079	32.23
Conmany B. Wesseh	Unity Party	1,528	23.69
Jonathan Boy Charles Sogbie	Independent	1,348	20.90
Hixenbaugh Kear Darbeh	Liberian Action Party	650	10.08
Patrick T. Dexter Johnson	Congress for Democratic Change	367	5.69
Edmund B. Gibson Jr.	National Patriotic Party	295	4.57
P. Tarpowah Dortu Kear Jr.	Alliance for Peace and Democracy	183	2.84
Total		6,450	100.00
Valid votes		6,450	94.45
Invalid/blank votes		379	5.55
Total votes		6,829	100.00

2009 River Gee County Senatorial By-election, Round 2
Candidate	Party	Votes	%
Nathaniel J. Williams	Liberia Destiny Party	3,498	52.83
Conmany B. Wesseh	Unity Party	3,123	47.17
Total		6,621	100.00
Valid votes		6,621	96.91
Invalid/blank votes		211	3.09
Total votes		6,832	100.00
LDP gain from LAP			

2009 Montserrado County Senatorial By-election, Round 1
Candidate	Party	Votes	%
Geraldine Doe-Sheriff	Congress for Democratic Change	33,874	35.48
Clemenceau Blayon Urey	Unity Party	28,329	29.68
Wilson Kargeor Tarpeh	Alliance for Peace and Democracy	15,555	16.29
Alhaji G.V. Kromah	Independent	6,729	7.05
A. Darius Dillon Sr.	Liberty Party	5,418	5.68
Grace Tee McGill Kpaan	Independent	2,224	2.33
Jacqueline Maudlyne Capehart	Independent	1,244	1.30
Jasper S. Fallah Ndaborlor	Free Democratic Party	1,143	1.20
Daniel G. Johnson	Independent	668	0.70
Nathaniel Semoda Toe Jr.	Independent	278	0.29
Total		95,462	100.00

2009 Montserrado Senatorial By-election, Round 2
Candidate	Party	Votes	%
Geraldine Doe-Sheriff	Congress for Democratic Change	58,384	56.00
Clemenceau Blayon Urey	Unity Party	45,864	44.00
Total		104,248	100.00
Valid votes		104,248	98.53
Invalid/blank votes		1,552	1.47
Total votes		105,800	100.00
CDC hold			
