= Anthonett Nabwe =

Liberian athlete (born 2004)

Personal information
- Nationality: Liberian
- Born: 22 January 2004 (age 22)

Sport
- Sport: Athletics
- Events: Hammer throw, Discus throw, Shot put

Achievements and titles
- Personal bests: Hammer throw: 77.64 m (2026) AR; Discus throw: 58.79 m (2025) NR; Shot put: 17.59 m (2024) NR

Anthonett Nabwe (born 22 January 2004) is a Liberian athlete based in the United States. She holds the African record in the hammer, and the Liberian national record in the shot put and discus. She won the weight throw at the 2026 NCAA Indoor Championships.

== Biography ==
Nabwe grew up in Monrovia, Liberia, before he family moved to the United States and settled in Jamestown, North Dakota, prior to her freshman year of high school at Jamestown High School. She played soccer and basketball, before focusing on athletics. She became a two-time state high school champion in the shot put and discus and also finished in the top three in the 100 m dash.

Having chosen to attend the University of Minnesota, Nabwe set the NCAA freshman record in the weight throw and won the Big Ten Conference indoor title in February 2024. That summer, she competed for Liberia at the 2024 African Championships in Douala, Cameroon, placing fourth in the shot put with a best throw of 16.01 meters. She also placed sixth overall in the hammer throw at the championships, with a best throw of 58.15 metres.

Competing for the University of Minnesota in February 2025, Nabwe won the weight throw with a personal best distance of 23.56 metres at the Snowshoe Open. She placed eleventh at the 2025 NCAA Division I Indoor Track and Field Championships in the weight throw in March. In May 2025, Nabwe threw a personal best and meet record 69.85 m to win the hammer throw at the Big Ten Outdoor Track & Field Championships in Eugene, Oregon.

At the Tyson Invitational in February 2026, Nabre set a Big Ten record weight throw of 24.67m to break the previous record set by Sade Olatoye in 2019. Nabwe's throw was the sixth all-time best in NCAA history. Nabwe won the weight throw at the 2026 NCAA Indoor Championships, finishing ahead of South African Phetisang Makhethe, with her best throw of 25.13 metres enough to move her third on the all-time American collegiate list. The following month, Nabwe threw an African hammer record of 75.72 m at the Tom Jones Memorial in Gainesville and improved it to 77.64 at the 2026 Drake Relays. In May, she won the hammer throw with 69.22m at the Big Ten Championships. She also finished second behind Axelina Johansson in the shot put with 18.00 m.
