= 2006 IAAF World Indoor Championships – Women's 4 × 400 metres relay =

2006 relay event

The Women's 4 × 400 metres relay event at the 2006 IAAF World Indoor Championships was held on March 12.

== Medalists ==
Gold	Silver	Bronze
Russia; Tatyana Levina; Natalya Nazarova; Olesya Forsheva; Natalya Antyukh; Yulia Gushchina*; Tatyana Veshkurova*	United States; Debbie Dunn; Tiffany Williams; Monica Hargrove; Mary Wineberg; Kia Davis*	Belarus; Natallia Solohub; Anna Kozak; Yulyana Yushchanka; Ilona Usovich

* Runners who participated in the heats only and received medals.

== Results ==
=== Heats ===
Qualification: First 2 teams of each heat (Q) plus the next 2 fastest (q) advance to the final.

Rank	Heat	Nation	Athletes	Time	Notes
1	1	Russia	Yulia Gushchina, Tatyana Veshkurova, Tatyana Levina, Natalya Antyukh	3:25.91	Q
2	2	Belarus	Natallia Solohub, Anna Kozak, Yulyana Yushchanka, Ilona Usovich	3:28.47	Q, NR
3	2	United States	Debbie Dunn, Tiffany Williams, Monica Hargrove, Kia Davis	3:29.44	Q
4	2	Great Britain	Melanie Purkiss, Jennifer Meadows, Emma Duck, Helen Karagounis	3:29.59	q, NR
5	1	Jamaica	Shellene Williams, Ronetta Smith, Moya Thompson, Allison Beckford	3:30.03	Q, NR
6	1	Poland	Grażyna Prokopek, Monika Bejnar, Marta Chrust-Rożej, Małgorzata Pskit	3:30.18	q, SB
7	1	Bulgaria	Monika Gachevska, Mariyana Dimitrova, Teodora Kolarova, Tezzhan Naimova	3:34.47	
8	2	Ukraine	Anastasiya Rabchenyuk, Olha Zavhorodnya, Oksana Shcherbak, Liliya Lobanova	3:35.80	SB

=== Final ===
Rank	Nation	Athletes	Time	Notes
1st place, gold medalist(s)	Russia	Tatyana Levina, Natalya Nazarova, Olesya Forsheva, Natalya Antyukh	3:24.91	
2nd place, silver medalist(s)	United States	Debbie Dunn, Tiffany Williams, Monica Hargrove, Mary Wineberg	3:28.63	SB
3rd place, bronze medalist(s)	Belarus	Natallia Solohub, Anna Kozak, Yulyana Yushchanka, Ilona Usovich	3:28.65	
4	Poland	Grażyna Prokopek, Monika Bejnar, Marta Chrust-Rożej, Małgorzata Pskit	3:28.95	NR
5	Jamaica	Shellene Williams, Novlene Williams, Moya Thompson, Allison Beckford	3:29.54	NR
6	Great Britain	Melanie Purkiss, Jennifer Meadows, Emma Duck, Helen Karagounis	3:29.70	
