= Liberia at the 1972 Summer Olympics =

- IOC code: LBR
- NOC: Liberia National Olympic Committee

in Munich
- Competitors: 5
- Flag bearer: Thomas Howe
- Medals: Gold 0 Silver 0 Bronze 0 Total 0

Summer Olympics appearances (overview)
- 1956; 1960; 1964; 1968; 1972; 1976; 1980; 1984; 1988; 1992; 1996; 2000; 2004; 2008; 2012; 2016; 2020; 2024; 2028

Liberia competed at the 1972 Summer Olympics in Munich, West Germany. The nation returned to the Olympic Games after missing the 1968 Summer Olympics.

== Results by event ==
=== Athletics ===
Men's 100 metres

- Andrew Sartee

- First Heat — 11.09s (→ did not advance)

Men's 400 metres

- Thomas N'Ma otherwise Nma

- First Round - Heat 3 — 49.73s (→ did not advance)

Men's 800 metres

- Thomas O'Brien Howe

- Heat — 2:00.7 (→ did not advance)

Men's 1500 metres

- Edward Kar

- Heat — 4:21.4 (→ did not advance)

Men's 4 × 100 m Relay

- Andrew Sartee, Thomas O'Brien Howe, Dominic Saidu, and Thomas N'Ma or Nma

- Heat — DNF (→ did not advance)
