= Nathaniel Williams (Liberian politician) =

Liberian politician

Member of the Senate of Liberia from River Gee County
- In office 2009–2012
- Preceded by: Isaac N. Johnson
- Succeeded by: Matthew N. Jaye

Personal details
- Died: August 9, 2016 Monrovia, Liberia
- Party: LDP

Nathaniel J. Williams (died August 9, 2016) was a Liberian politician.

== Biography ==
By 1999, Williams was serving in the Senate representing Grand Gedeh County. He was from the southern section of the county and advocated for the section to become its own county. Grand Gedeh County was later split into River Gee County.

In the 2005 election, Williams unsuccessfully ran for a River Gee County Senate seat. In 2006, as an activist, he opposed the Senate confirmation of former Justice Minister Kabineh Ja'neh as associate justice of the Supreme Court due to alleged human rights abuses.

In the 2009 River Gee County by-election, caused by the death of Senator Isaac N. Johnson, Williams ran with the Liberia Destiny Party, defeating ruling Unity Party candidate Conmany Wesseh. In the Senate, Williams served as chair of the labor committee. Williams opposed the confirmation of Wesseh as ambassador to the European Union due to alleged corruption.

In the 2011 election, Williams was defeated for re-election by independent candidate Matthew N. Jaye. By December 2013, Williams had joined the campaign of ex-warlord, Nimba County Senator Prince Johnson.

Williams died on August 9, 2016, in Monrovia.
