= Liberia Destiny Party =

Political party in Liberia

The Liberia Destiny Party (LDP) was a political party in Liberia.

== History ==
The LDP was founded in January 2004 by Nathaniel Barnes, who served as finance minister under President Charles Taylor. It was certified by the National Elections Commission (NEC) on July 4, 2005. In the 2005 election, Barnes served as the party's presidential candidate, with Parleh Dargbeh Harris as his running mate. Barnes received 9,325 votes, 1.0% of the total. In the subsequent run-off election, the LDP supported the Unity Party (UP) candidate, Ellen Johnson Sirleaf. The party fielded 11 candidates in the 2005 legislative elections, with 3 of them running in Senate races and 8 of them running in House races. None were elected.

In the 2009 River Gee County by-election caused by the death of Senator Isaac N. Johnson, Nathaniel Williams of the LDP was elected over the ruling UP candidate Conmany Wesseh.

In December 2010, Barnes expressed interest in contesting the presidency again in the 2011 election. In July 2011, he explained his party would not be contesting the presidency. In the 2011 legislative elections, the LDP fielded 5 Senate candidates and 18 House candidates. Senator Williams was defeated in his attempt at re-election by independent candidate Matthew Jaye. Alfred G. Juweh Sr. was elected in Rivercess County's 1st House district and Dallas Advertus V. Gueh was elected to the Rivercess County Senate seat.

By May 2014, the NEC had filed a petition to have 20 political parties, including the LDP, decertified. The LDP was accused of not meeting the standard for submitting statements to the NEC detailing the assets and liabilities of the party and its candidates. It was additionally accused of knowingly submitting false or misleading statements. Instead of challenging his party's decertification, Barnes joined the Free Democratic Party, a constituent party of the National Democratic Coalition, by October 2015.
