= Athletics at the 2016 Summer Olympics – Women's 400 metres =

Women's 400 metres at the Games of the XXXI Olympiad
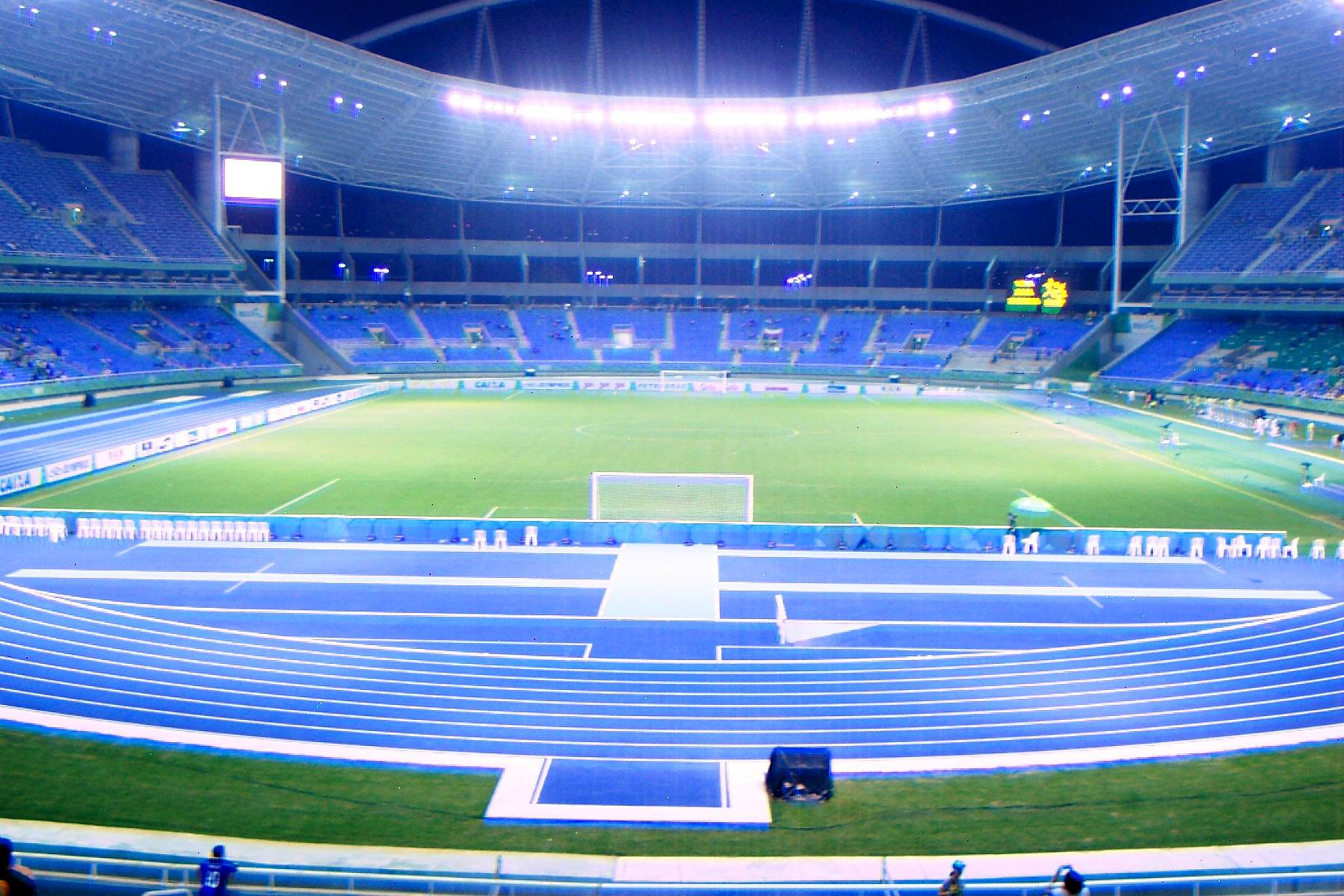
- Interior view of the Estádio Olímpico João Havelange, where the Women's 400m took place.
- Venue: Olympic Stadium
- Dates: 13 August 2016 (heats); 14 August 2016 (semifinals); 15 August 2016 (final)
- Competitors: 57 from 36 nations
- Winning time: 49.44

Medalists
1st place, gold medalist(s)		Shaunae Miller	Bahamas
2nd place, silver medalist(s)		Allyson Felix	United States
3rd place, bronze medalist(s)		Shericka Jackson	Jamaica

Official Video Highlights

The women's 400 metres event at the 2016 Summer Olympics took place between 13–15 August at the Olympic Stadium.

== Summary ==
Shaunae Miller of Bahamas was the world leading runner for 2016, followed by 2015 World Champion Allyson Felix. 2012 Olympic champion Sanya Richards-Ross had failed to make the American team due to a hamstring injury during the American trials.

In qualifying, 2 athletes ran under 51 seconds, American Phyllis Francis and Oluwakemi Adekoya, who ran a Bahraini record. Another Nigerian born Bahraini, 18-year-old Salwa Eid Naser, won her heat in a personal best.

In the final, Natasha Hastings made up most of the stagger on one of the favorites, Shaunae Miller and held the lead to the halfway point. Miller made up the stagger on Stephenie Ann McPherson in lane 8 to her outside. Starting about 150 metres into the race, Miller accelerated, passing Hastings before the halfway point in the far turn. In lane 4, Allyson Felix ran an even pace which saw her separate from the athletes inside of her and catching Shericka Jackson late in the second turn. Coming off the turn, Miller held a clear 2 metre advantage over Hastings, with Felix gaining on Hastings and Jackson more than a metre behind Felix. Hastings was passed by Felix who continued to gain on Miller. In the last few metres as Felix gained on her, Miller started to lean forward trying to get to the finish line. As Felix looked to pass her in the final step, Miller made a last desperate headlong dive across the line. The photo finish revealed her shoulders had crossed the line seven hundredths of a second ahead of Felix. Jamaican Shericka Jackson finished 3 metres back for bronze.

Felix's silver became her seventh Olympic medal. She would later earn two more Olympic gold medals as part of the winning 4×100 meters and 4×400 meters teams, tying her with Merlene Ottey as the most decorated woman in track and field history, with nine Olympic medals.

== Records ==
Prior to this competition, the existing global and area records were as follows:

World record	Marita Koch (GDR)	47.60 s	Canberra, Australia	6 October 1985
Olympic record	Marie-José Pérec (FRA)	48.25 s	Atlanta, Georgia, United States	29 July 1996
World Leading	Allyson Felix (USA)	49.68 s	Eugene, Oregon, United States	3 July 2016

Area
Area	Time (s)	Athlete	Nation
Africa (records)	49.10	Falilat Ogunkoya	Nigeria
Asia (records)	49.81	Ma Yuqin	China
Europe (records)	47.60 WR	Marita Koch	East Germany
North, Central America and Caribbean (records)	48.70	Sanya Richards	United States
Oceania (records)	48.63	Cathy Freeman	Australia
South America (records)	49.64	Ximena Restrepo	Colombia

== Schedule ==
All times are Brasilia Time (UTC-3)

Date	Time	Round
Saturday, 13 August 2016	11:00	Round 1
Sunday, 14 August 2016	20:35	Semifinals
Monday, 15 August 2016	22:45	Finals

== Results ==
=== Heats ===
Qualification rule: First 2 in each heat (Q) and the next 8 fastest (q) advance to the Semifinals

==== Heat 1 ====
Rank	Athlete	Nation	Time	Notes
1	Stephenie Ann McPherson	Jamaica	51.36	Q
2	Patience Okon George	Nigeria	51.83	Q
3	Anneliese Rubie	Australia	51.92	q, SB
4	Yuliya Olishevska	Ukraine	52.45	
5	Djénébou Danté	Mali	52.85	
6	Nirmala Sheoran	India	53.03	
7	Gunta Latiševa-Čudare	Latvia	53.08	SB

==== Heat 2 ====
Rank	Athlete	Nation	Time	Notes
1	Allyson Felix	United States	51.24	Q
2	Olha Zemlyak	Ukraine	51.40	Q
3	Tamara Salaški	Serbia	52.70	
4	Tsholofelo Thipe	South Africa	52.80	
5	Iveta Putálová	Slovakia	52.82	SB
6	Aauri Bokesa	Spain	53.51	
7	Seren Bundy-Davies	Great Britain	53.63	

==== Heat 3 ====
Rank	Athlete	Nation	Time	Notes
1	Phyllis Francis	United States	50.58	Q
2	Kemi Adekoya	Bahrain	50.72	Q
3	Margaret Bamgbose	Nigeria	51.43	q
4	Patrycja Wyciszkiewicz	Poland	52.02	q, SB
5	Alicia Brown	Canada	52.27	
6	Jailma de Lima	Brazil	52.65	
7	Justine Palframan	South Africa	53.96	

==== Heat 4 ====
Rank	Athlete	Nation	Time	Notes
1	Natasha Hastings	United States	51.31	Q
2	Christine Ohuruogu	Great Britain	51.40	Q
3	Maria Benedicta Chigbolu	Italy	52.06	
4	Lydia Jele	Botswana	52.24	
5	Olha Bibik	Ukraine	52.33	
6	Kendra Clarke	Canada	53.61	
7	Vijona Kryeziu	Kosovo	54.30	

==== Heat 5 ====
Rank	Athlete	Nation	Time	Notes
1	Shaunae Miller	Bahamas	51.16	Q
2	Morgan Mitchell	Australia	51.30	Q
3	Ruth Spelmeyer	Germany	51.43	q, PB
4	Emily Diamond	Great Britain	51.76	q
5	Kanika Beckles	Grenada	52.41	SB
6	Bianca Răzor	Romania	52.42	SB
7	Kineke Alexander	Saint Vincent and the Grenadines	52.45	

==== Heat 6 ====
Rank	Athlete	Nation	Time	Notes
1	Salwa Eid Naser	Bahrain	51.06	Q, PB
2	Libania Grenot	Italy	51.17	Q
3	Floria Gueï	France	51.29	q
4	Cátia Azevedo	Portugal	52.38	
5	Mariam Kromah	Liberia	52.79	
6	Nguyễn Thị Huyền	Vietnam	52.97	
7	Irini Vasiliou	Greece	54.37	
8	Maryan Nuh Muse	Somalia	1:10.14	

==== Heat 7 ====
Rank	Athlete	Nation	Time	Notes
1	Shericka Jackson	Jamaica	51.73	Q
2	Kabange Mupopo	Zambia	51.76	Q
3	Justyna Święty	Poland	51.82	q
4	Christine Botlogetswe	Botswana	52.37	
5	Omolara Omotosho	Nigeria	53.22	
6	Elina Mikhina	Kazakhstan	53.83	
7	Dalal Mesfer Al-Harith	Qatar	1:07.12	

==== Heat 8 ====
Rank	Athlete	Nation	Time	Notes
1	Christine Day	Jamaica	51.54	Q
2	Carline Muir	Canada	51.57	Q
3	Małgorzata Hołub	Poland	51.80	q
4	Geisa Coutinho	Brazil	52.05	
5	Aliyah Abrams	Guyana	52.79	
6	Mariama Mamoudou Ittatou	Niger	54.32	
DQ (7)	Anastassya Kudinova	Kazakhstan	~~56.03~~	DQ (Doping)

=== Semifinals ===
==== Semifinal 1 ====
Rank	Lane	Athlete	Nation	Reaction	Time	Notes
1	6	Phyllis Francis	United States	0.189	50.31	Q
2	5	Stephenie Ann McPherson	Jamaica	0.158	50.69	Q
3	4	Olha Zemlyak	Ukraine	0.189	50.75	q, PB
4	3	Kemi Adekoya	Bahrain	0.161	50.88	
5	7	Christine Ohuruogu	Great Britain	0.145	51.22	
6	2	Ruth Spelmeyer	Germany	0.155	51.61	
7	8	Margaret Bamgbose	Nigeria	0.212	51.92	
8	1	Patrycja Wyciszkiewicz	Poland	0.174	52.51	

==== Semifinal 2 ====
Rank	Lane	Athlete	Nation	Reaction	Time	Notes
1	6	Shericka Jackson	Jamaica	0.184	49.83	Q, PB
2	5	Natasha Hastings	United States	0.188	49.90	Q, SB
3	3	Salwa Eid Naser	Bahrain	0.139	50.88	PB
4	8	Floria Gueï	France	0.178	51.08	
5	7	Carline Muir	Canada	0.226	51.11	
6	1	Emily Diamond	Great Britain	0.178	51.49	
7	2	Małgorzata Hołub	Poland	0.136	51.93	
8	4	Morgan Mitchell	Australia	0.136	52.68	

==== Semifinal 3 ====
Rank	Lane	Athlete	Nation	Reaction	Time	Notes
1	3	Allyson Felix	United States	0.174	49.67	Q, SB
2	4	Shaunae Miller	Bahamas	0.167	49.91	Q
3	6	Libania Grenot	Italy	0.156	50.60	q
4	5	Christine Day	Jamaica	0.186	51.53	
5	1	Justyna Święty	Poland	0.171	51.62	
6	2	Anneliese Rubie	Australia	0.172	51.96	
7	8	Kabange Mupopo	Zambia	0.155	52.04	
8	7	Patience Okon George	Nigeria	0.161	52.52	

=== Final ===
Rank	Lane	Athlete	Nation	Reaction	Time	Notes
1st place, gold medalist(s)	7	Shaunae Miller	Bahamas	0.155	49.44	PB
2nd place, silver medalist(s)	4	Allyson Felix	United States	0.177	49.51	SB
3rd place, bronze medalist(s)	5	Shericka Jackson	Jamaica	0.176	49.85	
4	6	Natasha Hastings	United States	0.161	50.34	
5	3	Phyllis Francis	United States	0.219	50.41	
6	8	Stephenie Ann McPherson	Jamaica	0.133	50.97	
7	2	Libania Grenot	Italy	0.149	51.25	
DSQ	1	Olha Zemlyak	Ukraine	0.183	~~51.24~~	
