= Bill Rogers (athlete) =

Liberian middle-distance runner

Bill Rogers (born 30 September 1985) is a Liberian runner. He was born in Kakata, Liberia. He competed in the 1500 metres dash in the IAAF World Youth Championships in Athletics in Debrecen, Hungary in July, 2001.

He currently holds the Liberian national record for the 1500 m. He ran a 4:01.56 for the Liberian record in Cotonou, Benin on 27 June 2004.

Rogers was slated to run the 800 metres representing Liberia in the 2004 Summer Olympics in Athens, Greece but instead joined Sayon Cooper and Kouty Manweh in a boycott of the games due to alleged unfair treatment of the expelled Liberia National Olympic Committee (LNOC) boss, Clemenceau Urey.

In 2010 Bill formed the Bill Rogers Youth Foundation, benefiting and empowering the youth of Liberia. He is a graduate of El Paso Community College in El Paso, Texas and of Huston-Tillotson University in Austin, Texas with a Bachelor of Science in Kinesiology.
