= Thomas Howe (runner) =

Liberian middle-distance runner

Personal information
- Nationality: Liberian
- Born: 17 September 1944 (age 81)

Sport
- Sport: Middle-distance running
- Event: 800 metres

Thomas O'Brien Howe or Thomas Obdien Howe (born 17 September 1944) is a Liberian middle-distance runner. He competed in the men's 800 metres at the 1972 Summer Olympics.

Howe finished 8th in his heat with a 2:00.70 time. He was qualified to compete in the 4 × 100 m relay, but the Liberian team didn't start that event. He was the first known Liberian flag bearer at the Olympics.

Olympic Games
Preceded by Unknown	Flagbearer for Liberia; Munich 1972	Succeeded by Wallace Obey
