= Robert Dennis (sprinter) =

Liberian sprinter (born 1975)

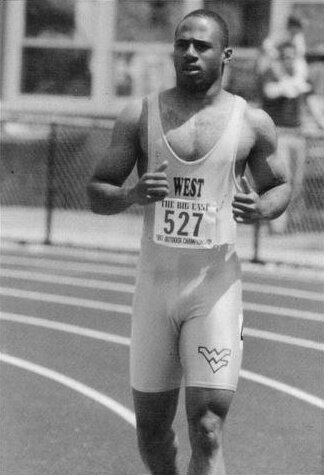
- Dennis at the Big East Conference Championships 1997

Personal information
- Nationality: Liberian
- Born: 1 May 1975 (age 51) Harbel, Liberia
- Height: 5'10 (1.78 m)
- Weight: 180 lb (82kg)

Sport
- Sport: Running
- Events: 100 meters, 200 meters
- College team: West Virginia University track and field University of Louisville football

Achievements and titles
- Personal bests: 100m: 10.28 s (Pennsylvania 1997); 200m: 20.58 s (Virginia 1998)

Robert Henry Dennis III (born May 1, 1975, in Harbel, Liberia) is a former Liberian sprinter. Dennis was once the Liberian National Record holder in the 200 meter (20.58) in Fairfax, Virginia in 1998. He is currently an attorney in Washington, DC.

== College and professional career ==
While competing for West Virginia University Dennis became the university's first Male Big East Conference Track & Field champion when he won the 100 and 200 meter events at the Conference Championships in May 1997. [1] Also, he was awarded the Most Outstanding Male Track Athlete Award at the 1997 Big East Outdoor Championships. He completed his collegiate career with multiple conference titles: Big East Conference champion in the 100 meter (1997, 1998) and 200 meter (1997), IC4A conference titles in the 100 meter (1996, 1997) and 200 meter (1997), and finished in the top 15 at the NCAA outdoor Track & Field Championship (1997 (100m), 1998 (200m)).

Dennis represented Liberia at the 1996 Summer Olympics in Atlanta, GA, competing in the Men's 100 meter and Men's 4 × 100 meter relay. He also competed at the World Championships in 1997 in Athens, Greece. His personal best time in the 100 meter are 10.28 seconds, achieved in May 1997 in Villanova, Pennsylvania, and in the 200 meter with a best time of 20.58 seconds in June 1998 in Fairfax, Virginia.

Dennis attributes much of his athletic success to his training with The Stable and his high school coach and mentor Henry Brady.

== Early years ==
Dennis was raised in Glenn Dale, Maryland. He attended DuVal High School in Lanham, Maryland where he was a standout athlete. Dennis was an all-state selection in football and track & field. He was the Prince George's County champion in the 100 and 200 meters, holding the top time in the 100 (10.4) and second-best in the 200 (21.3) in the Washington, DC metropolitan area during his senior season. He was undefeated in the 100 meters between July 1992 through June 1993. During this period he was awarded numerous sprint titles with the most prestigious being first place honors at the 1993 Maryland 3A State Championship in the 100 meter (10.65) in Westminster, Maryland. During this period he was confirmed as one of the fastest high school sprinters on the East coast of the United States. He completed his high school career as a member of the Washington Post 1993 All-Metropolitan Boys Track and Field First Team as well as being selected as a participant on the Inaugural Chesapeake Classic All-Star Football game. Dennis matriculated to the University of Louisville in Louisville, Kentucky on a football scholarship. He later transferred to West Virginia University in Morgantown, WV where he pursued an outstanding and successful track career, leaving the football field behind.
