= Samuel Birch (athlete) =

Liberian sprinter

Personal information
- Nationality: Liberian
- Born: 10 May 1963 (age 63)

Sport
- Sport: Sprinting
- Event: 100 metres

Samuel Birch (born 10 May 1963) is a Liberian sprinter. He competed in the men's 100 metres at the 1988 Summer Olympics.

Olympic Games
Preceded by Wallace Obey	Flagbearer for Liberia; Seoul 1988	Succeeded by Kouty Mawenh
