= Liberia at the 1960 Summer Olympics =

- IOC code: LBR
- NOC: Liberia National Olympic Committee

in Rome
- Medals: Gold 0 Silver 0 Bronze 0 Total 0

Summer Olympics appearances (overview)
- 1956; 1960; 1964; 1968; 1972; 1976; 1980; 1984; 1988; 1992; 1996; 2000; 2004; 2008; 2012; 2016; 2020; 2024

Liberia competed at the 1960 Summer Olympics in Rome, Italy. They had four athletes, of whom all competed in Athletics.

== Athletics ==
Key

- Note–Ranks given for track events are within the athlete's heat only
- Q = Qualified for the next round
- q = Qualified for the next round as a fastest loser or, in field events, by position without achieving the qualifying target
- N/A = Round not applicable for the event
- Bye = Athlete not required to compete in round

Men

Track & road events

Athlete	Event	Heat		Quarterfinal		Semifinal		Final	
Athlete	Event	Result	Rank	Result	Rank	Result	Rank	Result	Rank
Emmanuel Putu	100 m	11.34	5	did not advance					
James Roberts	100 m	11.37	7	did not advance					
James Roberts	200 m	23.22	4	did not advance					
George Johnson	400 m	51.54	6	did not advance					
George Johnson	800 m	1:56.04	6	did not advance					
Alifu Massaquoi	Marathon	—						3:43:18.0	62
