= Liberia at the 1964 Summer Olympics =

- IOC code: LBR
- NOC: Liberia National Olympic Committee

in Tokyo
- Medals: Gold 0 Silver 0 Bronze 0 Total 0

Summer Olympics appearances (overview)
- 1956; 1960; 1964; 1968; 1972; 1976; 1980; 1984; 1988; 1992; 1996; 2000; 2004; 2008; 2012; 2016; 2020; 2024; 2028

Liberia competed at the 1964 Summer Olympics in Tokyo, Japan.
