= Wallace Obey =

Liberian sprinter

Personal information
- Nationality: Liberian
- Born: 27 September 1961 (age 64)

Sport
- Sport: Sprinting
- Event: 4 × 100 metres relay

Wallace Obey (born 27 September 1961) is a Liberian sprinter. He competed in the men's 4 × 100 metres relay at the 1984 Summer Olympics.

Olympic Games
Preceded by Thomas Howe	Flagbearer for Liberia; Los Angeles 1984	Succeeded by Samuel Birch
