= Maya Neal =

Liberian footballer and athlete (born 1996)

Personal information
- Full name: Maya Camille Neal
- Date of birth: 22 December 1996 (age 29)
- Place of birth: Naperville, Illinois, United States
- Height: 1.58 m (5 ft 2 in)
- Position: Defender

College career
Years	Team	Apps	(Gls)
2015–2019	Tennessee Volunteers	79	(3)

Senior career*
Years	Team	Apps	(Gls)
2020–2021	Le Havre	5	(0)
2023	UMF Afturelding	18	(7)
2024-Present	BIIK Shymkent		
- * Club domestic league appearances and goals

Maya Camille Neal (born 22 December 1996) is a footballer and athlete. Born in the United States, she represents Liberia internationally.

== Early life and education ==
Neal was born on 22 December 1996 in Naperville, Illinois. She competed in her first triathlon at the age of nine. Neal attended Neuqua Valley High School in Naperville.

Neal attended the University of Tennessee, where she majored in political science. She was a multi-sport athlete for the Lady Vols, competing for the varsity soccer and track and field teams. She was regarded as one of the soccer team's most important players. She tore her meniscus in her collegiate soccer debut.

Neal represented Liberia at the 2016 African Championships in Athletics.

== Style of play ==
Neal has been described as having an "attack-minded defending style".

== Personal life ==
Neal is the daughter of Michelle Neal, an immigration attorney who was born in Liberia.
