= Siraj Williams =

Liberian sprinter

Siraj Williams born March 5, 1984, in Willingboro New Jersey is a Liberian athlete who specializes in sprinting. He holds the country's 400 meter record. He represented Liberia at the 2008 Summer Olympics, in the 400 meter dash. He was in the Men's 400 meter dash, and did not advance past the heats stage. He also attended Louisiana State University where he became a four time all-American
