= Gladys Thompson =

Liberian sprinter

Personal information
- Nationality: Liberian
- Born: 6 April 1983 (age 42)

Sport
- Sport: Sprinting
- Event: 200 metres

Gladys Thompson (born 6 April 1983) is a Liberian sprinter. She competed in the women's 200 metres at the 2004 Summer Olympics.
