= Mariam Kromah =

Liberian sprinter (born 1994)

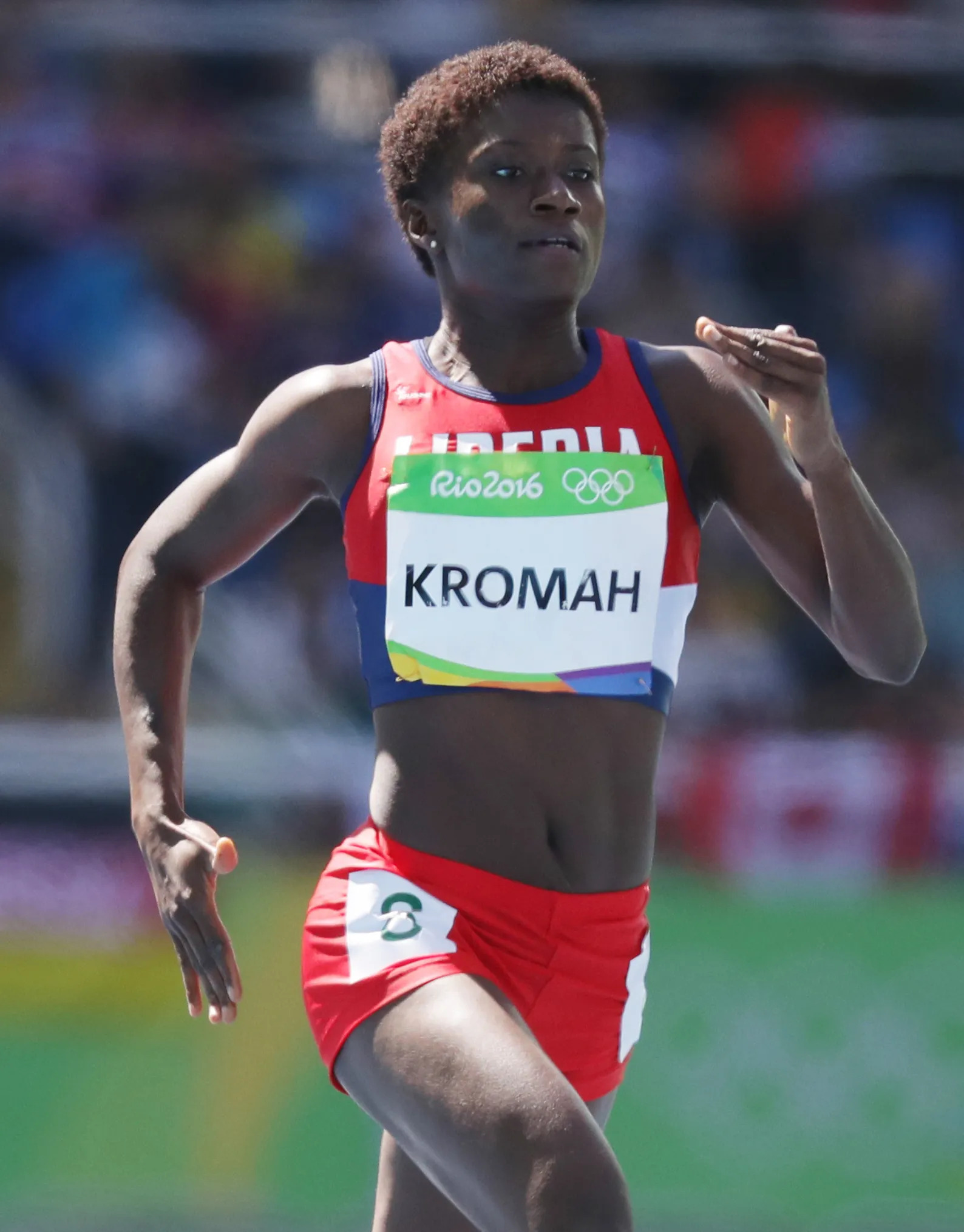
- Mariam Kromah at the Olympics Rio 2016

Personal information
- National team: Liberia
- Born: Mariam Kromah; January 1, 1994 (age 32) Monrovia, Liberia
- Education: University of Southern Mississippi
- Height: 5 ft 4 in (162 cm)
- Weight: 155 lb (70kg)

Sport
- Country: Liberia
- Sport: Athletics
- Events: 100 m, 200 m, 400 m
- College team: Southern Miss Golden Eagles

Mariam Kromah (born January 1, 1994) is a Liberian sprinter. She competed at the 2016 Summer Olympics in the women's 400 metres race; her time of 52.79 seconds in the heats did not qualify her for the semifinals.

== Early years ==
Mariam Kromah was born in Liberia on 1 January 1994, she started her sports career in track and field athletics.

== Early competitions ==
Mariam Kromah attended University of Southern Mississippi and was part of the university track and field team. She holds Southern Miss outdoor record in the 400 meters.

== Personal bests ==
Event	Time (seconds)	Venue	Date
200 metres	24.87	Murfreesboro MTSU Invitational, Tennessee, United States	7 February 2015
400 metres	55.16	Birmingham Conference, Alabama	26 February 2015
100 metres	12.00	Starkville Border Clash, Mississippi	10 April 2015
200 metres	23.83	Starkville Jeace LaCoste Invitational, Mississippi	2 May 2015
400 metres	53.00	El Paso Conference USA Ch., Texas	17 May 2015

== International competitions ==
Year	Competition	Venue	Position	Event	Notes
Representing Liberia
2016
2016	Olympic Games	Rio de Janeiro, Brazil	38th (h)	400 m	52.79
