= Phobay Kutu-Akoi =

Liberian sprinter (born 1987)

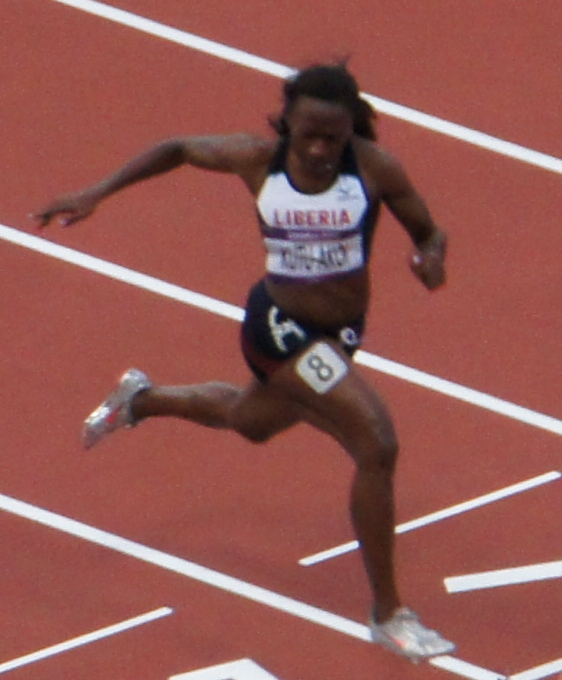
- Phobay Kutu-Akoi at the 2012 Summer Olympics

Personal information
- Born: 3 December 1987 (age 38) Monrovia, Liberia
- Education: St. John's University; B.A. in Psychology
- Height: 1.62 m (5 ft 4 in)
- Weight: 57 kg (126 lb)

Sport
- Sport: Athletics
- Event(s): 100 metres, 200 metres
- College team: St. John's University Redstorm
- Coached by: Monte Stratton

Phobay Kutu-Akoi (born 3 December 1987) is a Liberian athlete who competes in sprinting events. She represented her country in the 100 metres at the 2012 Summer Olympics. She was the flag bearer of Liberia during the opening ceremony. She also competed at the 2011 Outdoor World Championships in Daegu, South Korea and at the 2016 Indoor World Championships in Portland, Oregon.

== Competition record ==
Year	Competition	Venue	Position	Event	Notes
Representing Liberia
2010	African Championships	Nairobi, Kenya	11th (sf)	100 m	12.10
2011	World Championships	Daegu, South Korea	36th (h)	100 m	11.60
2012	African Championships	Porto-Novo, Benin	5th (sf)	100 m	11.74 (Note: Did not start in the final)
2012	African Championships	Porto-Novo, Benin	5th (h)	200 m	23.89 (Note: Did not start in the semifinals)
2012	African Championships	Porto-Novo, Benin	5th	4 × 400 m relay	3:33.24
2012	Olympic Games	London, United Kingdom	42nd (h)	100 m	11.52
2016	World Indoor Championships	Portland, United States	35th (h)	60 m	7.56

== Personal bests ==
Outdoor

- 100 metres – 11.37 (+2.0 m/s, San Marcos 2012)
- 200 metres – 23.89 (-0.2 m/s, Porto Novo 2012)

Indoor

- 60 metres – 7.41 (Norman 2012)

Olympic Games
Preceded by Jangy Addy	Flagbearer for Liberia; 2012 London	Succeeded by Emmanuel Matadi
