= Jangy Addy =

Liberian decathlete (born 1985)

Medal record

Men's athletics

Representing Liberia

All-Africa Games
Gold medal – first place	2011 Maputo	Decathlon

Jangy McKinley Addy (born 2 March 1985) is a Liberian decathlete.

He was born in 1985 in Sacramento, California, was raised in Norcross, Georgia and attended the University of Tennessee. His parents are from Liberia and he was eligible to compete for that nation. He served as the flag-bearer for Liberia at the 2008 Summer Olympics, where he finished 19th in the decathlon.

== Achievements ==
Year	Competition	Venue	Position	Event	Notes
Representing the United States
2004	World Junior Championships	Grosseto, Italy	11th	Decathlon (junior)	7129 pts
Representing Liberia
2008	Olympic Games	Beijing, China	19th	Decathlon	7665 pts
2011	All-Africa Games	Maputo, Mozambique	1st	Decathlon	7985 pts
2012	Summer Olympics	London, United Kingdom	23rd	Decathlon	7586 pts

Olympic Games
Preceded by Christopher Sayeh	Flagbearer for Liberia; 2008 Beijing	Succeeded by Phobay Kutu-Akoi
