= Nimley Twegbe =

Liberian long-distance runner

Personal information
- Nationality: Liberian
- Born: 9 September 1963 (age 62)

Sport
- Sport: Long-distance running
- Event: Marathon

Nimley Twegbe (born 9 September 1963) is a Liberian long-distance runner. He competed in the 5000 metres and marathon at the 1984 Summer Olympics, and the 800 metres at the 1988 Summer Olympics.

== Career ==
Twegbe's performance in the 1984 Olympic 5000 m, over 2 minutes behind the second-to-last finisher, received widespread coverage in U.S. media. He was described as the "most lopsided loser of Olympic track and field competition to date".

The 1984 Olympics were his first international competition, with the Liberian coach James Davies stating that Twegbe had never run in front of more than 1,500 people before. He was described as "shy" in contrast to the crowd of 80,000 spectators cheering him on. He led the field on the first of 12 laps, but faded after that. His Olympic finishing time of 17:36 was two minutes slower than his 5000 m personal best of 15:37 set that year.

The crowd gave him a standing ovation on his last lap. While Twegbe said the crowd didn't frighten him, he reportedly did not understand that they were cheering him on rather than mocking him. Twegbe said, "In my heart, I felt ashamed to be failing... I expected to be one of the winners". Despite his poor performance, he still committed to run the 1984 Olympic marathon despite not ever having run a marathon before. He did not finish the race.

The year after the 1984 Olympics, Twegbe finally completed a marathon, setting a new best of 3:08:22 hours. He returned at the 1988 Summer Olympics, this time competing in the 800 metres. He ran 1:58.43 to finish 8th in his heat, failing to advance to the finals.

== Personal life ==
TTwegbe is from Monrovia, Liberia and was born on 9 September 1963, though some American media erroneously thought Twegbe was 14 years old at the time of the 1984 Olympics. He began running in about 1981, practicing only on the dirt tracks available to him. One of his parents was a tax collector, and Twegbe studied engineering in school.

Twegbe didn't like the synthetic track used for the 1984 Olympics, saying it caused him joint pain. He had a fever in the days preceding the 1984 Olympics which he didn't reveal until after his race.
