= Grace-Ann Dinkins =

American-Liberian track and field athlete

Grace-Ann Dinkins OLY (born September 13, 1966) also known as Gracie-Ann Dinkins or Grace Dinkins, is a track and field athlete from the USA who competes for Liberia, her parents' home country, in the 100 m, 200 m, and 400 m races. Over her competitive career, she became the record-holder for those distances in Liberia. She was the first woman to represent Liberia at the Olympics.

Dinkins competed at the 1984 Summer Olympics for Liberia in the 100 m race. Only 17 years old at the time, she failed to advance to the finals. She again competed at the 1996 Summer Olympics for Liberia in the 100 m race, but did not advance to the finals. She returned to compete in the 2000 Summer Olympics also competing for Liberia in the 100 m race, but once more failed to advance to the finals.

A 1987 graduate of California State University, Dominguez Hills, Dinkins retired from track and field competition in 2003 but still works closely with the Liberian track and field teams.

Dinkins' between- and post-Olympics profession has been as a trauma surgeon at King-Drew Medical Center in Los Angeles, California. She was featured on an episode of TLC's (now Discovery Health Channel's) reality TV series Trauma: Life In The E.R. as a chief resident in 1998. More recently, she spoke at the press conference as the trauma surgeon on call who treated one of the victims of the shooter who attacked and killed two Israeli ticketing agents for El Al Airlines at LAX Airport in 2002.
