= Kia Davis =

Liberian-American sprinter (born 1976)

Personal information
- Nationality: Liberia; United States
- Born: 23 May 1976 (age 50) Monrovia, Liberia
- Height: 1.70 m (5 ft 7 in)
- Weight: 54 kg (119 lb)

Sport
- Sport: Athletics
- Event: Sprint

Achievements and titles
- Personal best(s): 200 m: 23.12 s (2007); 400 m: 51.55 s (2008)
Medal record
Women's athletics
Representing United States
World Indoor Championships
Silver medal – second place	2006 Moscow	4×400 m relay

Kia Davis (born May 23, 1976, in Monrovia) is a Liberian-American sprinter. She is a multiple-time national record holder in the sprint and hurdles, a three-time USA Track & Field national indoor finalist for the 60 m hurdles, and holds a dual citizenship for Liberia and the United States in order to compete internationally for her categories. She also won the silver medal, as a member of the U.S. team, in the women's 4 × 400 m relay at the 2006 IAAF World Indoor Championships in Moscow, Russia.

Davis represented her nation Liberia at the 2008 Summer Olympics in Beijing, where she competed in two sprint categories. For her first event, 400 metres, Davis ran in the fifth heat against six other athletes, including American sprinter Sanya Richards, who eventually won the bronze medal in the final. She finished the race only in last place by sixty-three hundredths of a second (0.63) behind Kazakhstan's Olga Tereshkova, with a time of 53.99 seconds. Three days later, Davis competed for her second event, 200 metres, where she finished the first heat in sixth place by fifteen hundredths of a second (0.15) ahead of Suriname's Kirsten Nieuwendam, outside her personal best time of 24.31 seconds. Davis, however, failed to advance into the next round for all of her participating events.

Davis currently resides in Chester, Pennsylvania, and works as an assistant head coach for the Pittsburgh Panthers Track and Field team, focusing on the sprint and hurdles.
