= Sayon Cooper =

Liberian sprinter

Sayon Cooper (born 26 April 1974) is a retired Liberian sprinter.

Cooper first competed for the Central State Marauders track and field team at Central State University in Ohio. He later transferred to Abilene Christian University in Abilene, Texas, where he earned the 1997 NCAA Division II championship in both the 100 m and 200 m dashes. Cooper is a member of Alpha Phi Alpha fraternity.

He represented Liberia at the 1996 and 2000 Summer Olympics, competing in the Men's 100 m, 200 m, and Men's 4 x 100 m relay. He also competed at the World Championships in 1997, 1999, 2001 and 2003 as well as the World Indoor Championships in 1999 and 2001. He has not competed on the international level since 2003.

His personal best time in the 100 metres is 10.15 seconds, achieved in May 1997 in Abilene. In the 200 metres he clocked a best time of 20.50 seconds in June 2000 in Kourou.

Cooper coached the Liberian team at three different Summer Olympics, including at the 2024 Summer Olympics in Paris.
