= Liberia National Olympic Committee =

National Olympic Committee

- Country: Liberia
- Code: LBR
- Created: 1954
- Recognized: 1955
- Continental Association: ANOCA
- Headquarters: Monrovia
- President: Sylvester Rennie
- Website: www.liberianoc.org

The Liberia National Olympic Committee (IOC code: LBR) is the National Olympic Committee (NOC) representing Liberia.

== See also ==
- Liberia at the Olympics
