= Kouty Mawenh =

Liberian sprinter

Personal information
- Nationality: Liberian
- Born: 8 December 1971 (age 53)

Sport
- Sport: Sprinting
- Event: 4 × 100 metres relay

Kouty Mawenh (born 8 December 1971) is a Liberian sprinter. He competed in the 4 × 100 metres relay at the 1996 Summer Olympics and the 2000 Summer Olympics. He serves as Liberia's attaché to the Olympics.

Olympic Games
Preceded by Samuel Birch	Flagbearer for Liberia; Atlanta 1996 Sydney 2000	Succeeded by Christopher Sayeh
