= Joseph Fahnbulleh =

Liberian-American sprinter (born 2001)

- Fahnbulleh at the 2024 African Championships

Personal information
- Full name: Joseph Blowadeh Siafa Fahnbulleh
- Born: 11 September 2001 (age 25)
- Home town: Hopkins, Minnesota, U.S.
- Education: Hopkins High School
- Height: 1.88 m (6 ft 2 in)

Sport
- Country: Liberia
- Sport: Athletics
- Events: 100 meters, 200 meters
- College team: Florida Gators

Achievements and titles
- Personal bests: 100 m: 9.98 +1.6 m/s (Gainesville 2023); 200 m: 19.83 +0.6 m/s (Eugene 2022)
Medal record
Men's athletics
Representing Liberia
African Games
Bronze medal – third place	2023 Accra	4x100 m relay
African Championships
Gold medal – first place	2024 Douala	100 m
Gold medal – first place	2024 Douala	200 m

Joseph Blowadeh Siafa Fahnbulleh (born 11 September 2001) is a Liberian-American sprinter. An Olympic finalist, Fahnbulleh is a double NCAA champion and finished fourth at the 2022 World Athletics Championships in the 200 meters race. He was 2024 African champion in both the 100 metres and 200 metres.

== Early and personal life ==
Born in Hopkins, Minnesota, to Liberian parents, Fahnbulleh attended Hopkins High School. His mother was brought up in Liberia but had to flee to the United States to avoid the Liberian Civil War when she was twelve years-old.

== Career ==
After being named National High School Coaches' Association boys athlete of the year in 2019, he was encouraged by Florida coach Mike Holloway to attend the University of Florida, and Fahnbulleh subsequently won the 200 m at the 2021 NCAA Outdoor National Championships with a personal best time of 19.91 seconds. He was also named National Senior Boys' Track and Field Athlete of the Year.

After declaring for the Liberian national team and being named to their roster for the 2020 Summer Olympics in Tokyo, Fahnbulleh was given the honor of being the flag bearer for his nation in the opening ceremony. His journey to Tokyo was the first time Fahnbulleh had ever been outside of the United States.

Fahnbulleh made it through to the final of the 2020 Olympics 200 meters race with a time of 19.99 seconds in his semi-final, setting a new Liberian national record. He finished in fifth place in the final, again setting a new national record with a time of 19.98 seconds.

On 10 June 2022, Fahnbulleh won both the 100 m and 200 m events at the 2022 NCAA Division I Outdoor Track and Field Championships with times of 10.00 (+0.6 m/s) and 19.83 (+0.6 m/s) respectively, helping the Florida Gators to the 2022 NCAA men's team title.

Fahnbulleh placed fourth at the 2022 World Athletics Championships in the 200 meters, running 19.84 seconds in the final.

Competing in the 200 meters at the World Athletics Championships in Budapest in 2023, he qualified from the semi finals for his third consecutive major 200 meters final.

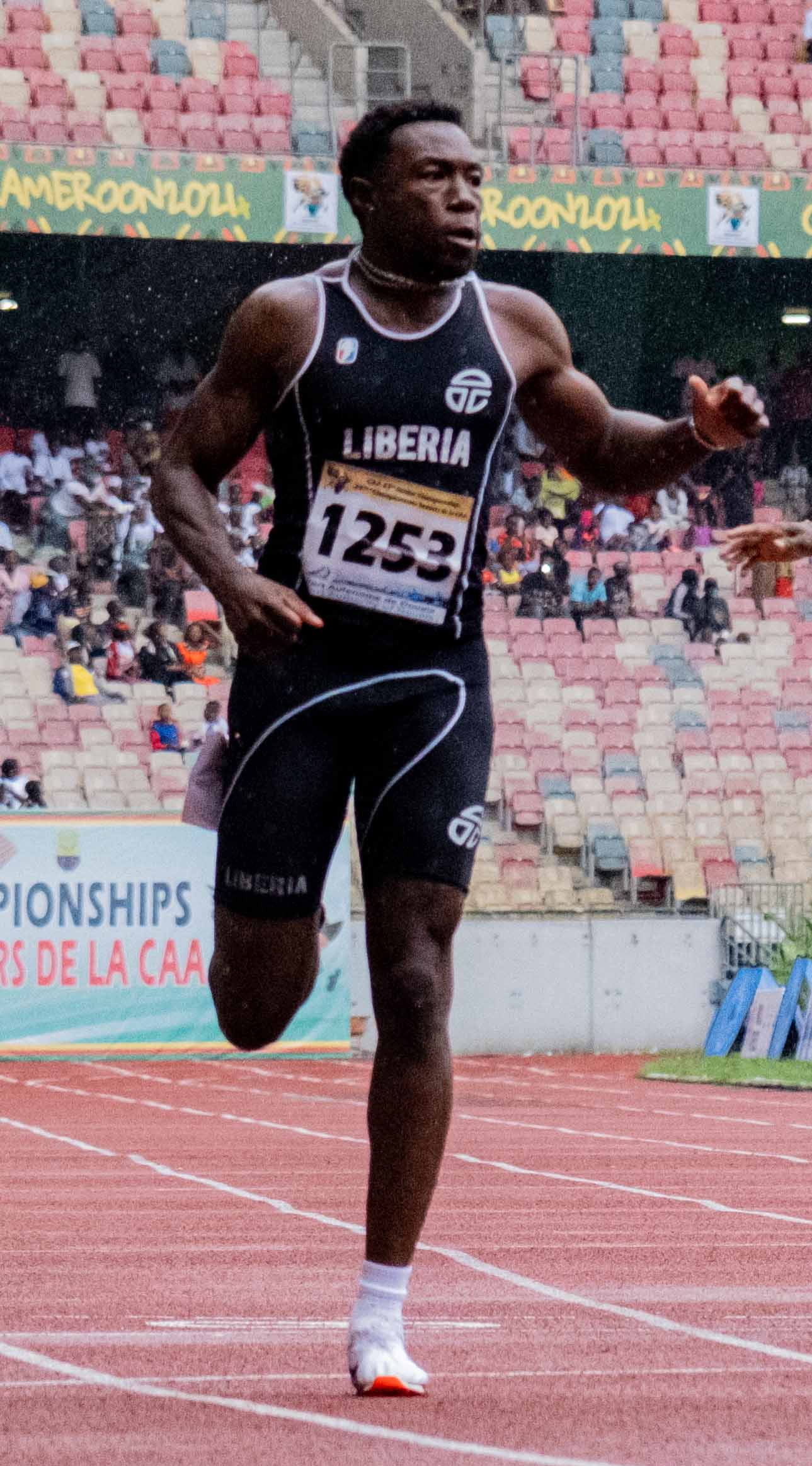
Fahnbulleh representing Liberia in 2024

In March 2024, he was a bronze medalist in the 4x100m relay at the 2023 African Games. He ran as part of the Liberian 4x100m relay team that qualified for the 2024 Paris Olympics at the 2024 World Relays Championships in Nassau, Bahamas. In May 2024, he finished fourth in the 200 metres at the 2024 Prefontaine Classic. He competed in the 200m at the 2024 Paris Olympics, where he reached the final, placing seventh overall. He also competed in the men's 4x100m relay at the Games.

He finished third over 200 meters in May 2025 at the 2025 Doha Diamond League. The following week he ran 20.12 seconds (0.4 m/s) to finish second in the 200 meters at the 2025 Meeting International Mohammed VI d'Athlétisme de Rabat, also part of the 2025 Diamond League. He ran 20.40 seconds to win the 200 metres at the Kip Keino Classic in Nairobi on 31 May 2025. He finished fourth on the 200 metres at the 2025 Bislett Games in Oslo on 12 June 2025. He placed eighth in the 200 metres at the Diamond League Final in Zurich on 28 August.

In September 2025, he competed in the 200 metres at the 2025 World Championships in Tokyo, Japan.

== Sponsorship ==
In August 2022, Fahnbulleh announced he had signed a professional contract with global brand Asics.

== Statistics ==
- Information from World Athletics profile unless otherwise noted.

=== Grand Slam Track ===
Grand Slam Track results
Slam	Race group	Event	Pl.	Time	Prize money
2025 Kingston Slam	Short sprints	100 m	8th	10.39	US$12,500
2025 Kingston Slam	Short sprints	200 m	4th	20.42	US$12,500

=== Personal records ===
Event	Time / Mark	Wind (m/s)	Venue	Date	Notes
100 m	9.98	+1.6	Percy Beard Track, Gainesville, Florida, U.S.	April 15, 2023	NR
200 m	19.83	+0.6	Hayward Field, Eugene, Oregon, U.S.	June 10, 2022	NR
60 m indoor	6.73	—N/a	Columbia, South Carolina, U.S.	February 6, 2021	
200 m indoor	20.32	—N/a	Fayetteville, Arkansas, U.S.	February 27, 2022	
300 m indoor	33.42	—N/a	Clemson, South Carolina, U.S.	January 11, 2020	

Olympic Games
Preceded by Emmanuel Matadi	Flag bearer for Liberia; Tokyo 2020 with Ebony Morrison	Succeeded by Thelma Davies; Emmanuel Matadi
