= Emmanuel Matadi =

Liberian sprinter (born 1991)

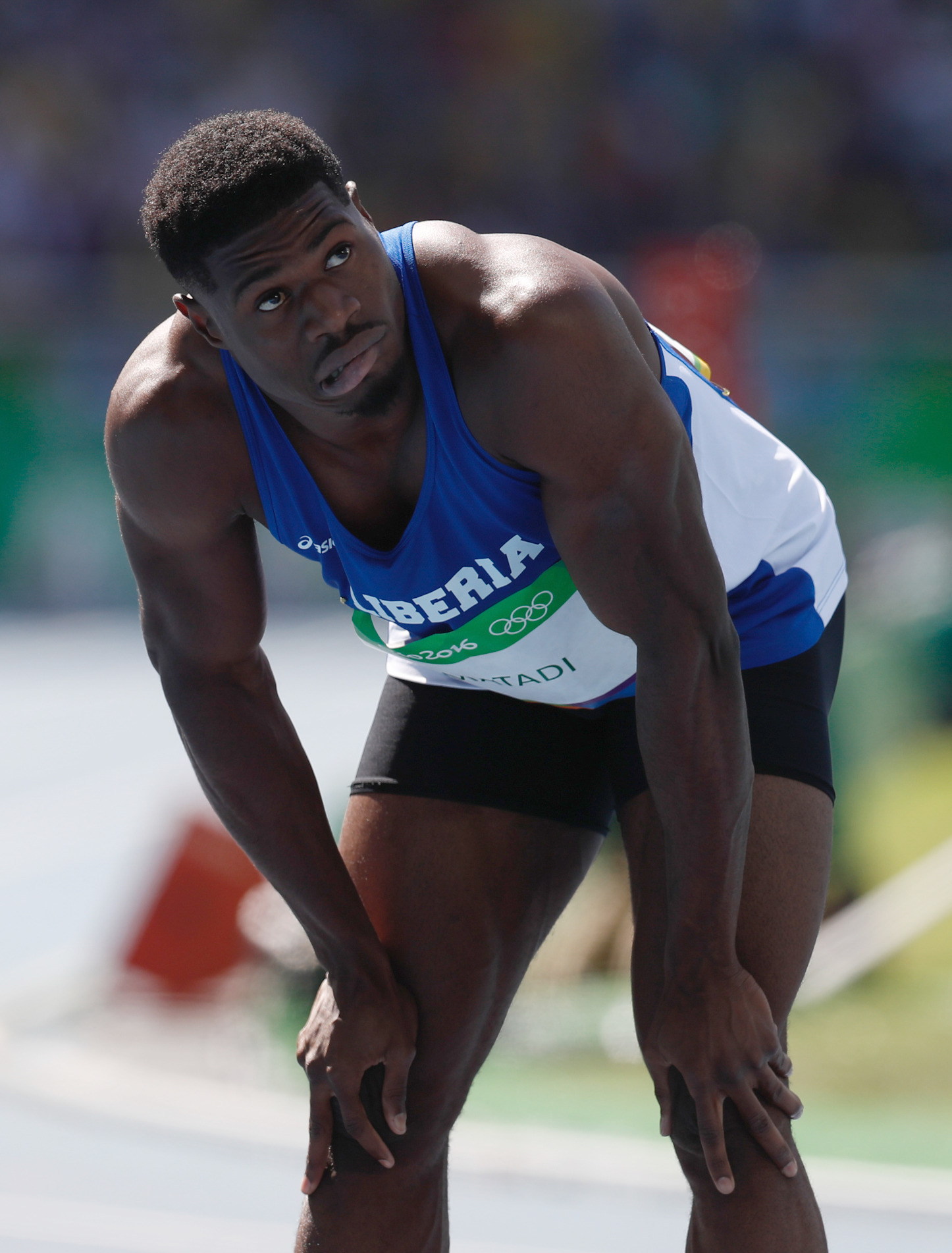
- Matadi at the 2016 Olympics

Personal information
- Born: 15 April 1991 (age 35) Monrovia, Liberia
- Education: Minnesota State University
- Agent: Lee-Roy Newton
- Height: 6 ft 2 in (187 cm)

Sport
- Country: Liberia
- Sport: Track and field
- Event: Sprint
- College team: Minnesota State Mavericks
Medal record
Men's athletics
Representing Liberia
African Games
Bronze medal – third place	2023 Accra	4×100 m
African Championships
Bronze medal – third place	2016 Durban	200 m

Emmanuel Matadi (born 15 April 1991) is a Liberian sprinter. Matadi has represented Liberia in the 2016 Summer Olympics, the 2017 World Athletics Championships, the 2020 Summer Olympics, and 2024 Summer Olympics.

Matadi graduated from Johnson Senior High School in Saint Paul, Minnesota. As a senior, he won the Minnesota State High School championship in 100 meters in 2009. Matadi attended the University of Louisville before transferring to Minnesota State University, Mankato. At MNSU, Matadi won national titles in the 100m and 200m. He also holds Liberia's national records in the 60m and 100m.

Internationally, Matadi won bronze in the 200 meters at the 2016 African Championships and made his Olympic debut while competing for Liberia at the 2016 Summer Olympics in the 100m and 200m. He was the flag bearer for Liberia in the Parade of Nations.

In the 2017 World Championships, Matadi was one of three Africans to advance to the semifinals of the 100m in London.

In December 2025, it was announced that he was joining the Enhanced Games.

== Personal bests ==
Outdoor

- 100 meters – 9.91 (+1.2 m/s, Gainesville, FL 2024) NR
- 200 meters – 20.07 (+2.0 m/s, Austin, TX 2023)

Indoor

- 60 meters – 6.52 (Louisville 2022) NR
- 200 meters – 21.13 (Albuquerque 2016)

== International competitions ==
Year	Competition	Venue	Position	Event	Notes
Representing Liberia
2016	African Championships	Durban, South Africa	5th	100 m	10.24 (w)
2016	African Championships	Durban, South Africa	3rd	200 m	20.55
2016	Olympic Games	Rio de Janeiro, Brazil	43rd (h)	100 m	10.31
2016	Olympic Games	Rio de Janeiro, Brazil	30th (h)	200 m	20.49
2017	World Championships	London, United Kingdom	14th (sf)	100 m	10.20
2019	World Championships	Doha, Qatar	23rd (sf)	100 m	10.28
2021	Olympic Games	Tokyo, Japan	35th (h)	100 m	10.25
2022	African Championships	Port Louis, Mauritius	6th	100 m	10.08
2022	World Championships	Eugene, United States	10th (sf)	100 m	10.12
2023	World Championships	Budapest, Hungary	11th (sf)	100 m	10.04
2024	World Indoor Championships	Glasgow, United Kingdom	10th (sf)	60 m	6.58
2024	African Games	Accra, Ghana	3rd	4 × 100 m relay	38.73
2024	African Championships	Douala, Cameroon	3rd (h)	4 × 100 m relay	40.00
2024	Olympic Games	Paris, France	26th (sf)	100 m	10.18
2024	Olympic Games	Paris, France	15th (h)	4 × 100 m relay	38.97

Olympic Games
Preceded by Phobay Kutu-Akoi	Flagbearer for Liberia; Rio de Janeiro 2016	Succeeded by Ebony Morrison; Joseph Fahnbulleh
Preceded by Ebony Morrison; Joseph Fahnbulleh	Flagbearer for Liberia; Paris 2024 with Thelma Davies	Succeeded by Incumbent
