= 2010 African Championships in Athletics – Women's 200 metres =

The women's 200 metres at the 2010 African Championships in Athletics were held on July 31–August 1.

== Medalists ==
Gold	Silver	Bronze
Damola Osayemi; Nigeria	Estie Wittstock; South Africa	Perennes Pau Zang Milama; Gabon

== Results ==
=== Heats ===
Qualification: First 3 of each heat (Q) and the next 4 fastest (q) qualified for the semifinals.

Rank	Heat	Name	Nationality	Time	Notes
1	1	Perennes Pau Zang Milama	Gabon	23.88	Q
2	1	Damola Osayemi	Nigeria	24.03	Q
3	3	Endurance Abinuwa	Nigeria	24.03	Q
4	2	Estie Wittstock	South Africa	24.12	Q
5	2	Rachael Nachula	Zambia	24.18	Q
6	3	Delphine Atangana	Cameroon	24.24	Q
7	2	Justine Bayigga	Uganda	24.25	Q
8	1	Charlotte Mebenga Amombo	Cameroon	24.33	Q
9	1	Milcent Ndoro	Kenya	24.47	q, SB
10	4	Carina Horn	South Africa	24.67	Q
11	4	Fantu Magiso	Ethiopia	24.87	Q, NR
12	2	Nathalie Itok	Cameroon	24.91	q
13	1	Mary Jane Vincent	Mauritius	24.94	q
14	4	Lorène Bazolo	Republic of the Congo	24.95	Q
15	2	Catherine Nandi	Kenya	25.09	q, SB
16	3	Rabecca Nachula	Zambia	25.16	Q
17	2	Elodie Pierre Louis	Mauritius	25.23	
18	4	Stephanie Guillame	Mauritius	25.33	
19	3	Maryline Chelagat	Kenya	25.38	
20	4	Marie Josée Ta Lou	Ivory Coast	25.55	
21	1	Natacha Ngoye	Republic of the Congo	25.76	
22	3	Ndzinisa Phumlile	Swaziland	26.27	
23	2	Hubtama Ali	Ethiopia	26.66	
24	3	Sophie Kanakuze	Rwanda	26.76	NR
25	2	Sahara Mbweti	Democratic Republic of the Congo	27.20	
26	4	Carla Makonga	Democratic Republic of the Congo	28.13	
	1	Merlin Bernice Diamond	Namibia	DNS	
	1	Suzen Tengatenga	Malawi	DNS	
	3	Tjipekapora Herunga	Namibia	DNS	
	3	Nthompe Seonyatseng	Botswana	DNS	
	4	Mildred Gamba	Uganda	DNS	
	4	Blessing Okagbare	Nigeria	DNS	

=== Semifinals ===
Qualification: First 3 of each semifinal (Q) and the next 2 fastest (q) qualified for the final.

Rank	Heat	Name	Nationality	Time	Notes
1	1	Damola Osayemi	Nigeria	23.31	Q, SB
2	1	Perennes Pau Zang Milama	Gabon	23.54	Q, NR
3	2	Estie Wittstock	South Africa	23.59	Q, SB
4	2	Delphine Atangana	Cameroon	23.61	Q
5	1	Justine Bayigga	Uganda	23.69	Q
6	1	Carina Horn	South Africa	23.88	q
7	2	Endurance Abinuwa	Nigeria	23.93	Q
8	2	Rachael Nachula	Zambia	24.09	q
9	2	Charlotte Mebenga Amombo	Cameroon	24.35	
10	1	Fantu Magiso	Ethiopia	24.45	NR
11	2	Mary Jane Vincent	Mauritius	24.58	
12	2	Lorène Bazolo	Republic of the Congo	24.61	NR
13	1	Rabecca Nachula	Zambia	24.66	
14	1	Nathalie Itok	Cameroon	24.73	
15	1	Catherine Nandi	Kenya	24.80	
	2	Milcent Ndoro	Kenya	DNS	

=== Final ===
Wind: +1.10 m/s

Rank	Lane	Name	Nationality	Time	Notes
1st place, gold medalist(s)	5	Damola Osayemi	Nigeria	23.36	SB
2nd place, silver medalist(s)	4	Estie Wittstock	South Africa	23.50	SB
3rd place, bronze medalist(s)	6	Perennes Pau Zang Milama	Gabon	23.59	
4	3	Delphine Atangana	Cameroon	23.70	
5	8	Endurance Abinuwa	Nigeria	23.73	SB
6	7	Justine Bayigga	Uganda	23.79	
7	2	Carina Horn	South Africa	24.04	
8	1	Rachael Nachula	Zambia	24.18	
