= 2012 African Championships in Athletics – Women's 400 metres =

The women's 400 metres at the 2012 African Championships in Athletics was held at the Stade Charles de Gaulle on 27, 28 and 29 June.

== Medalists ==
Gold	Amantle Montsho; Botswana
Silver	Regina George; Nigeria
Bronze	Amy Mbacké Thiam; Senegal

== Records ==
Standing records prior to the 2012 African Championships in Athletics
World record	Marita Koch (GER)	47.60	Canberra, Australia	6 October 1985
African record	Falilat Ogunkoya (NGR)	49.10	Atlanta, United States	29 July 1996
Championship record	Amantle Montsho (BOT)	49.83	Addis Ababa, Ethiopia	2 May 2008
Broken records during the 2012 African Championships in Athletics
Championship record	Amantle Montsho (BOT)	49.54	Porto-Novo, Benin	29 June 2012

== Schedule ==
Date	Time	Round
27 June 2012	15:25	Round 1
28 June 2012	15:50	Semifinals
29 June 2012	15:30	Final

== Results ==
=== Round 1 ===
First 4 in each heat (Q) and 4 best performers (q) advance to the Semifinals.

Rank	Heat	Lane	Name	Nationality	Time	Note
1	2	8	Amantle Montsho	Botswana	50.42	Q
2	2	3	Regina George	Nigeria	51.39	Q
3	1	4	Tsholofelo Thipe	South Africa	52.06	Q
4	4	6	Bukola Abogunloko	Nigeria	52.11	Q
5	2	2	Joyce Sakari	Kenya	52.38	Q
6	2	7	Ndeye Fatou Soumah	Senegal	52.57	Q
7	1	3	Raasin McIntosh	Liberia	52.63	Q
8	5	1	Lydia Mashila	Botswana	52.65	Q
9	4	8	Goitseone Seleka	Botswana	53.11	Q
10	1	5	Salam Abrhaley	Ethiopia	53.47	Q
11	3	3	Rorisang Ramonnye	South Africa	53.58	Q
11	4	2	Estie Wittstock	South Africa	53.58	Q
13	1	8	Endurance Abinuwa	Nigeria	53.65	Q
14	5	8	Tigst Assefa	Ethiopia	54.05	Q
15	1	6	Matacha Ngoye Akamabi	Republic of the Congo	54.31	q
16	2	4	Adelaide Nkrumah	Ghana	54.49	q
17	1	7	Fatou Dyabaye	Senegal	54.60	q
18	3	4	Amy Mbacké Thiam	Senegal	54.65	Q
19	1	2	Audrey Nkamsao	Cameroon	54.67	q
20	3	7	Grace Kidake	Kenya	54.91	Q
21	5	3	Yvonne Amegashie	Ghana	54.98	Q
22	4	3	Catherine Nandi	Kenya	54.99	Q
23	2	6	Phumlile Ndzinisa	Swaziland	55.37	
24	4	5	Mahlet Mulugeta	Ethiopia	55.62	
25	3	2	Souliatou Saka	Benin	55.77	Q
26	3	1	Lydie Besme Hawa	Chad	57.01	
27	3	8	Natasha Bibi	Seychelles	57.36	
28	5	6	Kadia Dembele	Mali	57.74	Q
29	5	4	Bana Lafia Gounou	Benin	58.65	
30	2	5	Mohmed Ali Sourah	Djibouti	1:03.84	
	5	5	Vanice Monteiro	Cape Verde	DNF	
	5	7	Tjipekapora Herunga	Namibia	DSQ	
	3	5	Rahma Mohammed	Eritrea	DNS	
	3	6	Angele Cooper	Liberia	DNS	
	4	4	Ramata Nikiema	Burkina Faso	DNS	
	4	7	Graciela Maitius	Guinea-Bissau	DNS	
	5	2	Racheal Nachula	Zambia	DNS	

=== Semifinals ===
First 2 in each heat (Q) and 2 best performers (q) advance to the Final.

Rank	Heat	Lane	Name	Nationality	Time	Note
1	2	5	Amantle Montsho	Botswana	51.25	Q
2	1	4	Regina George	Nigeria	51.71	Q
3	3	6	Bukola Abogunloko	Nigeria	52.12	Q
4	3	5	Amy Mbacké Thiam	Senegal	52.35	Q
5	1	5	Joyce Sakari	Kenya	52.36	Q
6	1	6	Tsholofelo Thipe	South Africa	52.51	q
7	3	8	Estie Wittstock	South Africa	52.61	q
8	1	8	Ndeye Fatou Soumah	Senegal	52.85	
9	2	6	Raasin McIntosh	Liberia	52.91	Q
10	2	4	Rorisang Ramonnye	South Africa	52.93	
11	3	3	Lydia Mashila	Botswana	53.60	
12	2	8	Endurance Abinuwa	Nigeria	53.75	
13	1	3	Goitseone Seleka	Botswana	54.09	
14	2	3	Salam Abrhaley	Ethiopia	54.84	
15	3	7	Catherine Nandi	Kenya	54.91	
16	2	2	Fatou Dyabaye	Senegal	55.19	
17	1	1	Audrey Nkamsao	Cameroon	55.20	
18	2	7	Grace Kidake	Kenya	55.47	
19	3	4	Tigst Assefa	Ethiopia	55.58	
20	1	7	Yvonne Amegashie	Ghana	55.82	
21	3	2	Adelaide Nkrumah	Ghana	55.85	
22	2	1	Souliatou Saka	Benin	56.64	
23	3	1	Matacha Ngoye Akamabi	Republic of the Congo	57.47	
24	1	2	Kadia Dembele	Mali	57.64	

=== Final ===
Rank	Lane	Name	Nationality	Time	Note
1st place, gold medalist(s)	3	Amantle Montsho	Botswana	49.54	CR
2nd place, silver medalist(s)	5	Regina George	Nigeria	51.11	
3rd place, bronze medalist(s)	4	Amy Mbacké Thiam	Senegal	51.68	
4	6	Bukola Abogunloko	Nigeria	51.78	
5	2	Tsholofelo Thipe	South Africa	52.26	
6	8	Joyce Sakari	Kenya	52.28	
7	1	Estie Wittstock	South Africa	52.84	
	7	Raasin McIntosh	Liberia	DNS	
