= 2008 African Championships in Athletics – Women's 400 metres =

The women's 400 metres event at the 2008 African Championships in Athletics was held at the Addis Ababa Stadium on April 30–May 2.

== Medalists ==
Gold	Silver	Bronze
Amantle Montsho; Botswana	Folashade Abugan; Nigeria	Racheal Nachula; Zambia

== Results ==
=== Heats ===
Qualification: First 4 of each heat (Q) and the next 4 fastest (q) qualified for the semifinals.

Rank	Heat	Name	Nationality	Time	Notes
1	1	Amantle Montsho	Botswana	52.23	Q
2	2	Elizabeth Muthuka	Kenya	53.27	Q
3	3	Tsholofelo Thipe	South Africa	53.48	Q
4	2	Joy Eze	Nigeria	53.52	Q
5	3	Racheal Nachula	Zambia	53.63	Q
6	3	Nawal El Jack	Sudan	53.86	Q
7	1	Folashade Abugan	Nigeria	53.86	Q
8	4	Oluoma Nwoke	Nigeria	54.18	Q
9	4	Justine Bayigga	Uganda	54.54	Q
10	3	Kou Luogon	Liberia	54.61	q
11	2	Fatou Bintou Fall	Senegal	54.83	Q
12	1	Ndèye Fatou Soumah	Senegal	55.17	Q
13	1	Sandrine Thiébaud-Kangni	Togo	55.71	q
14	2	Tjipekapora Herunga	Namibia	56.03	q
15	1	Elisa Cossa	Mozambique	56.49	q
16	4	Seonyatseng Nthompe	Botswana	56.58	Q
17	4	Pinkard Maisha	Liberia	56.65	
18	2	Tihanna Vorster	South Africa	56.72	
19	3	Emily Nanziri	Uganda	57.16	
20	3	Fatou Diabaye	Senegal	57.46	
21	4	Ramatoulaye Gassama	Mali	57.50	
22	4	Charity Boahemaa	Ghana	58.03	
23	1	Wesene Belay	Ethiopia	58.09	
24	4	Mulu Diriba	Ethiopia	58.14	
25	2	Wesene Daba	Ethiopia	58.48	
26	1	V.S. Kantanka	Ghana	58.74	
27	3	Kensa Sylla	Guinea	59.38	
28	2	Jeanne D'Arc Uwamahoro	Rwanda	1:01.08	
29	2	Mariama Camara	Guinea	1:02.50	
	1	Ghada Abuagila	Libya	DNS	
	4	Pamela Jelimo	Kenya	DNS	

=== Semifinals ===
Qualification: First 3 of each semifinal (Q) and the next 2 fastest (q) qualified for the final.

Rank	Heat	Name	Nationality	Time	Notes
1	2	Amantle Montsho	Botswana	51.16	Q
2	1	Folashade Abugan	Nigeria	51.60	Q
3	1	Racheal Nachula	Zambia	51.99	Q, NR
4	1	Elizabeth Muthuka	Kenya	52.46	Q
5	1	Tsholofelo Thipe	South Africa	52.48	q
6	2	Nawal El Jack	Sudan	52.49	Q
7	2	Joy Eze	Nigeria	52.57	Q
8	2	Kou Luogon	Liberia	52.99	q
9	2	Oluoma Nwoke	Nigeria	53.20	
10	2	Justine Bayigga	Uganda	53.88	
11	1	Tjipekapora Herunga	Namibia	54.00	
12	2	Ndèye Fatou Soumah	Senegal	54.67	
13	1	Sandrine Thiébaud-Kangni	Togo	54.76	
14	2	Elisa Cossa	Mozambique	54.91	
15	1	Seonyatseng Nthompe	Botswana	56.61	
	1	Fatou Bintou Fall	Senegal	DNF	

=== Final ===
Rank	Lane	Name	Nationality	Time	Notes
1st place, gold medalist(s)	6	Amantle Montsho	Botswana	49.83	CR
2nd place, silver medalist(s)	6	Folashade Abugan	Nigeria	50.89	
3rd place, bronze medalist(s)	5	Racheal Nachula	Zambia	51.39	NR
4	5	Tsholofelo Thipe	South Africa	51.49	
5	4	Nawal El Jack	Sudan	51.93	
6	8	Joy Eze	Nigeria	52.16	
7	7	Elizabeth Muthuka	Kenya	52.81	
	1	Kou Luogon	Liberia	DNF	
