= 2010 African Championships in Athletics – Women's 4 × 400 metres relay =

The women's 4 × 400 metres relay at the 2010 African Championships in Athletics was held on August 1.

== Results ==
Rank	Nation	Competitors	Time	Notes
1st place, gold medalist(s)	Nigeria	Shade Abugan, Margaret Etim, Bukola Abogunloko, Ajoke Odumosu	3:29.26	
2nd place, silver medalist(s)	Kenya	Grace Miroyo Kidake, Catherine Nandi, Maureen Jelagat Maiyo, Janeth Jepkosgei	3:35.12	
3rd place, bronze medalist(s)	Senegal	Ndeye Fatou Soumah, Fatou Diabaye, Marietou Badji, Amy Mbacké Thiam	3:35.55	
4	Botswana	Nthompe Seonyatseng, Amantle Montsho, Kgalalelo Sefo, Oarabile Babolayi	3:37.17	NR
5	Ethiopia	Mantegbosh Melese, Wesene Belay, Emebet Fikadu, Fantu Megso	3:40.44	NR
6	Uganda	Justine Bayigga, Mildred Gamba, Agnes Aneno, Emily Nanziri	3:41.24	
	Cameroon	Fanny Appes Ekanga, Delphine Atangana, Nathalie Itok, Charlotte Mebenga Amombo	DNS	
	Ghana	Rosina Amenebede, Elizabeth Amolofo, Janet Amponsah, Beatrice Gyaman	DNS	
