= Athletics at the 2011 All-Africa Games – Women's 400 metres =

The Women's 400 metres at the 2011 All-Africa Games took place on 11–13 September at the Estádio Nacional do Zimpeto.

The final held at 5:45 p.m. local time.

== Medalists ==
Gold	Amantle Montsho (BOT)
Silver	Amy Mbacké Thiam (SEN)
Bronze	Tjipekapora Herunga (NAM)

== Records ==
Prior to the competition, the records were as follows:

World record	Marita Koch (GDR)	47.60	Canberra, Australia	6 October 1985
Championship record	Fatima Yusuf (NGR)	49.43	Harare, Zimbabwe	August 1995
World Leading	Anastasia Kapachinskaya (RUS)	49.35	Cheboksary, Russia	22 July 2011
African Record	Falilat Ogunkoya (NGR)	49.10	Atlanta, GA, United States	29 July 1996

== Schedule ==
Date	Time	Round
September 11, 2011	17:30	Heats
September 12, 2011	17:55	Semifinals
September 13, 2011	17:45	Final

== Results ==
KEY:	q	Fastest non-qualifiers	Q	Qualified	NR	National record	PB	Personal best	SB	Seasonal best

=== Heats ===
Qualification: First 3 in each heat (Q) and the next 4 fastest (q) advance to the semifinals.

Rank	Heat	Name	Nationality	Time	Notes
1	2	Tjipekapora Herunga	Namibia	52.61	Q
2	1	Ndeye Fatou Soumah	Senegal	52.92	Q
3	2	Bukola Abogunloko	Nigeria	52.94	Q
4	3	Margaret Etim	Nigeria	53.13	Q
5	1	Omolara Omotosho	Nigeria	53.17	Q
6	3	Joy Sakari	Kenya	53.22	Q
7	4	Amantle Montsho	Botswana	53.26	Q
8	2	Rachael Nachula	Zambia	54.02	Q
9	4	Amy Mbacké Thiam	Senegal	54.39	Q
10	2	Ndzinisa Phumlile	Swaziland	54.48	q
11	4	Grace Kidake	Kenya	55.05	Q
12	2	Aminata Sylla	Senegal	55.18	q
13	2	Manteigibosh Melese	Ethiopia	55.73	q
14	1	Goitseone Seleka	Botswana	55.88	Q
15	3	Sylvie Zimbere	Cameroon	56.21	Q
16	1	Natacha Ngoye	Republic of the Congo	57.23	q
17	4	Elsa Macie	Mozambique	57.66	
18	2	Lydia Mashila	Botswana	57.68	
19	4	Blessing Miel Ayedou	Benin	57.69	
20	1	Fayza Omer	Sudan	57.84	
21	3	Fatou Touré	Democratic Republic of the Congo	59.98	
	3	Nawal El Jack	Sudan	DNF	

=== Semifinals ===
Qualification: First 3 in each heat (Q) and the next 2 fastest (q) advance to the final.

Rank	Heat	Name	Nationality	Time	Notes
1	1	Amantle Montsho	Botswana	51.50	Q
2	1	Bukola Abogunloko	Nigeria	52.61	Q
3	2	Joy Sakari	Kenya	52.63	Q
4	2	Ndeye Fatou Soumah	Senegal	52.71	Q
5	1	Tjipekapora Herunga	Namibia	52.85	Q
6	2	Omolara Omotosho	Nigeria	52.85	Q
7	2	Margaret Etim	Nigeria	52.89	q
8	1	Amy Mbacké Thiam	Senegal	53.41	q
9	1	Phumlile Ndzinisa	Swaziland	54.26	NR
10	2	Aminata Sylla	Senegal	54.53	
11	1	Sylvie Zimbere	Cameroon	54.75	
12	1	Racheal Nachula	Zambia	54.80	
13	2	Goitseone Seleka	Botswana	55.58	
14	2	Grace Kidake	Kenya	55.73	
15	2	Manteigibosh Melese	Ethiopia	55.84	
16	1	Natacha Ngoye	Republic of the Congo	60.40	

=== Final ===
Rank	Name	Nationality	Time	Notes
1st place, gold medalist(s)	Amantle Montsho	Botswana	50.87	
2nd place, silver medalist(s)	Amy Mbacké Thiam	Senegal	51.77	
3rd place, bronze medalist(s)	Tjipekapora Herunga	Namibia	51.84	NR
4	Ndeye Fatou Soumah	Senegal	52.17	
5	Joy Sakari	Kenya	52.18	
6	Bukola Abogunloko	Nigeria	53.08	
7	Margaret Etim	Nigeria	53.15	
8	Omolara Omotosho	Nigeria	53.19	
