= 2010 African Championships in Athletics – Women's 400 metres =

The women's 400 metres at the 2010 African Championships in Athletics were held on July 28–30.

== Medalists ==
Gold	Silver	Bronze
Amantle Montsho; Botswana	Amy Mbacké Thiam; Senegal	Shade Abugan; Nigeria

== Results ==
=== Heats ===
Qualification: First 3 of each heat (Q) and the next 4 fastest (q) qualified for the semifinals.

Rank	Heat	Name	Nationality	Time	Notes
1	4	Amantle Montsho	Botswana	51.66	Q
2	1	Amy Mbacké Thiam	Senegal	52.98	Q
3	1	Rachael Nachula	Zambia	53.29	Q
4	2	Ndeye Fatou Soumah	Senegal	53.38	Q
5	2	Estie Wittstock	South Africa	53.59	Q
6	3	Shade Abugan	Nigeria	53.64	Q
7	1	Kgalalelo Sefo	Botswana	53.88	Q
8	2	Emily Nanziri	Uganda	54.10	Q
9	4	Nawal El Jack	Sudan	54.35	Q
10	1	Josephine Ehigie	Nigeria	54.48	q, SB
11	2	Mantegbosh Melese	Ethiopia	55.08	q
12	2	Rabecca Nachula	Zambia	55.32	q
13	4	Catherine Nandi	Kenya	55.40	Q
14	4	Fatou Diabaye	Senegal	55.54	q
15	3	Fayza Guma	Sudan	55.56	Q
16	3	Elizabeth Amolofo	Ghana	55.69	Q
17	1	Grace Miroyo Kidake	Kenya	55.76	
18	2	Kemei Emily Cherotich	Kenya	55.80	
19	3	Oarabile Babolayi	Botswana	55.86	
20	3	Agnes Aneno	Uganda	56.12	
21	2	Annabelle Lascar	Mauritius	56.88	
22	1	Tjipekapora Herunga	Namibia	57.03	
23	1	Emebet Fikadu	Ethiopia	57.37	
24	4	Fantu Megso	Ethiopia	58.32	
25	4	Claudine Rosine Yemalin	Benin	58.74	
26	4	Elisa Cossa	Mozambique	58.87	
27	3	Jeanne D'Arc Uwamahoro	Rwanda	59.12	
28	4	Natacha Ngoye	Republic of the Congo	1:02.01	
29	1	Antonieta Cape	Guinea-Bissau	1:02.88	
	2	Jenifer Chikwasa Msosa	Malawi	DNS	
	3	Lydie Besme Haoua	Chad	DNS	
	3	Nathalie Itok	Cameroon	DNS	

=== Semifinals ===
Qualification: First 3 of each semifinal (Q) and the next 2 fastest (q) qualified for the final.

Rank	Heat	Name	Nationality	Time	Notes
1	2	Amantle Montsho	Botswana	50.39	Q
2	2	Shade Abugan	Nigeria	52.28	Q
3	1	Amy Mbacké Thiam	Senegal	52.48	Q
4	1	Ndeye Fatou Soumah	Senegal	52.53	Q
5	1	Estie Wittstock	South Africa	52.95	Q
6	1	Nawal El Jack	Sudan	53.57	q
7	1	Rabecca Nachula	Zambia	53.69	q
8	2	Rachael Nachula	Zambia	53.95	Q
9	1	Josephine Ehigie	Nigeria	53.77	SB
10	1	Kgalalelo Sefo	Botswana	54.04	
11	2	Emily Nanziri	Uganda	54.37	
12	2	Elizabeth Amolofo	Ghana	54.43	SB
13	1	Catherine Nandi	Kenya	54.72	
14	2	Mantegbosh Melese	Ethiopia	54.92	
15	2	Fayza Guma	Sudan	55.60	
16	2	Fatou Diabaye	Senegal	56.35	

=== Final ===
Rank	Lane	Name	Nationality	Time	Notes
1st place, gold medalist(s)	6	Amantle Montsho	Botswana	50.03	PB
2nd place, silver medalist(s)	4	Amy Mbacké Thiam	Senegal	51.32	SB
3rd place, bronze medalist(s)	3	Shade Abugan	Nigeria	51.63	
4	5	Ndeye Fatou Soumah	Senegal	51.93	
5	7	Estie Wittstock	South Africa	52.60	
6	8	Rachael Nachula	Zambia	53.26	
7	2	Nawal El Jack	Sudan	53.80	
8	1	Rabecca Nachula	Zambia	54.12	
