= Margaret Etim =

Nigerian sprinter (born 1992)

Medal record

Women's athletics

Representing Nigeria

African Championships
Gold medal – first place	2010 Nairobi	4×400 m
Gold medal – first place	2012 Porto-Novo	4×400 m

Margaret Etim (born 28 November 1992) is a Nigerian sprinter specialising in the 400 metres. She won the silver medal at the 2010 World Junior Championships in addition to multiple medals with the Nigerian 4 × 400 metres relay.

Her personal best in the event is 51.24 seconds set in Makurdi in 2010.

== Competition record ==
Year	Competition	Venue	Position	Event	Notes
Representing Nigeria
2010	World Junior Championships	Moncton, Canada	2nd	400 m	53.05
2010	World Junior Championships	Moncton, Canada	5th	4 × 100 m relay	44.84
2010	World Junior Championships	Moncton, Canada	2nd	4 × 400 m relay	3:31.84
2010	African Championships	Nairobi, Kenya	1st	4 × 400 m relay	3:29.26
2010	Commonwealth Games	Delhi, India	7th	400 m	52.66
2010	Commonwealth Games	Delhi, India	–	4 × 400 m relay	DQ
2011	African Junior Championships	Gaborone, Botswana	3rd	400 m	53.23
2011	African Junior Championships	Gaborone, Botswana	2nd	4 × 400 m relay	3:38.87
2011	World Championships	Daegu, South Korea	7th	4 × 400 m relay	3:29.82
2011	All-Africa Games	Maputo, Mozambique	7th	400 m	53.15
2012	African Championships	Porto-Novo, Benin	1st	4 × 400 m relay	3:28.77
2015	African Games	Brazzaville, Republic of the Congo	5th	400 m	52.64
