= Mahlet Mulugeta =

Ethiopian middle-distance runner

Personal information
- Nationality: Ethiopian
- Born: 20 March 1995 (age 31)

Sport
- Sport: Middle-distance running
- Event: 800 metres
Medal record
Women's athletics
Representing Ethiopia
African U20 Championships
Silver medal – second place	2013 Bambous	4 × 400 m relay

Mahlet Mulugeta (Amharic: ማህሌት ሙሉጌታ; born 20 March 1995) is an Ethiopian middle-distance runner. She was the 2017 Ethiopian Athletics Championships winner over 800 m and competed in the women's 800 metres at the 2017 World Championships in Athletics.

== Career ==
Running on the senior Ethiopian 4 × 400 m squad alongside Tigst Assefa, Mulugeta placed 7th at the 2012 African Championships finals and placed 5th in her individual 400 m heat. The following year, she won a silver medal at the African U20 championships on the 4 × 400 m with Assefa again, and placed 7th in the 400 m finals.

In 2017, Mulugeta won her first Ethiopian Athletics Championships national title. She ran a time of 2:02.2 minutes over 800 m to beat Tigist Ketema. She placed runner-up at the 2017 Fanny Blankers-Koen Games in a personal best time of 2:00.77. At the 2017 World Championships, Mulugeta ran 2:02.04 to place 5th in her heat and did not advance.

After 2017, Mulugeta was said to have preferred longer distances over sprints. She set her personal best 800 m of 1:59.84 to finish 3rd at the 2018 Tomblaine meeting. She was ranked 40th in the world over that event. In June 2018, Mulugeta won the 800 m at the PTS Meeting in Samorin, Slovakia.

At the 2019 Doha Diamond League, Mulugeta finished 10th in the 800 m, running 2:02.14. She was also 11th at the Golden Spike Ostrava meeting over 1500 metres with a 4:10.71 time.

She made her 10K run debut in 2022, finishing 9th at the 10K Valencia race.

In January 2023, Mulugeta was among the final six runners in the lead pack at the Juan Muguerza Cross-Country championships. Later that year, she won the Rothman 8K and the Fort Collins Thanksgiving 4-miler road race. Mulugeta was described as having "moved up in distance in recent years" in the lead-up to the 2023 Cross Champs, but she did not start the race.

She also won the 2024 FireKracker Elite 5K run in Fort Collins, Colorado. Mulugeta was 10th at the 2024 Cooper River Bridge Run and 18th at the Houston Half Marathon. She was 18th at the 2025 Cooper River Run.
