= Natacha Ngoye Akamabi =

Congolese sprinter (born 1993)

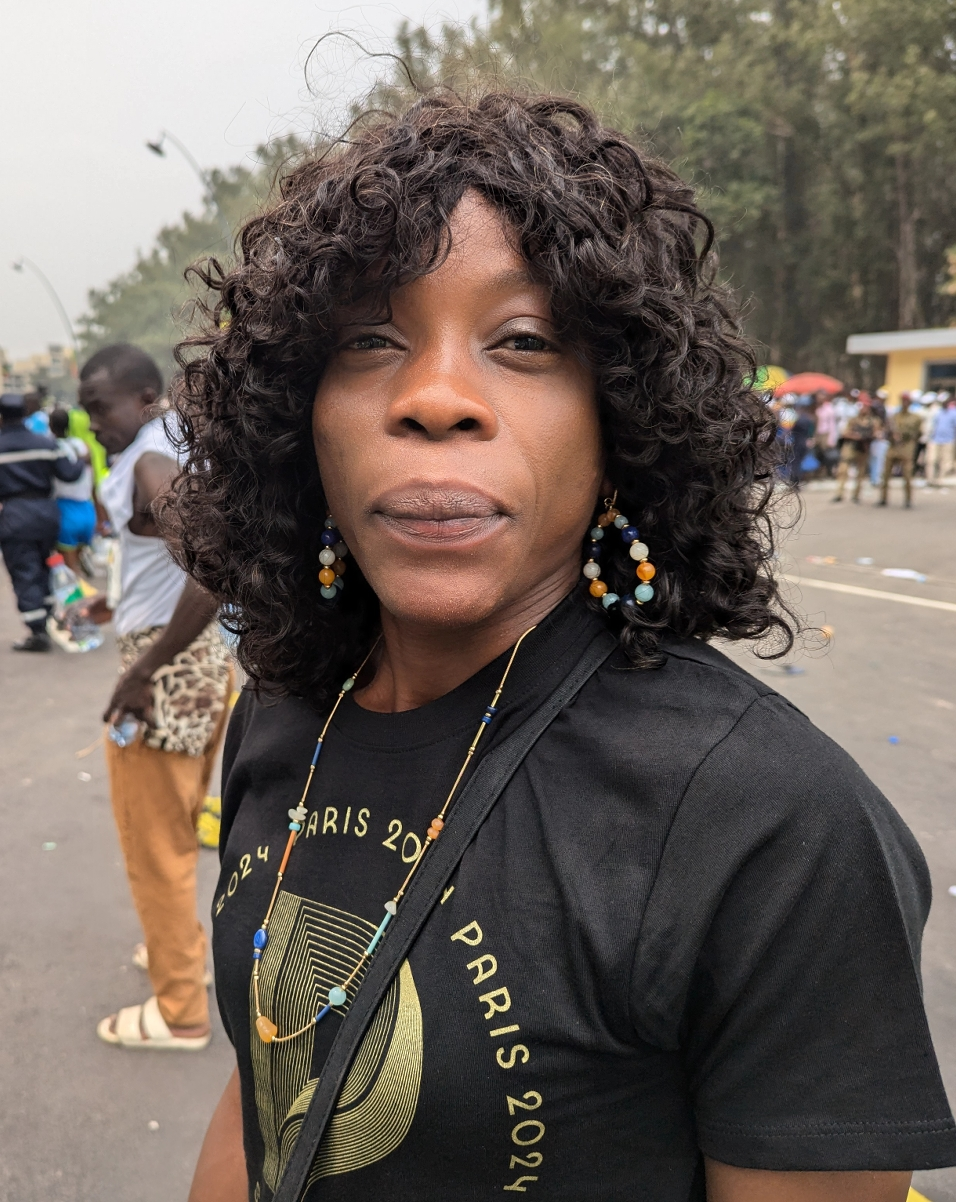

Personal information
- Born: 15 August 1993 (age 32) Pointe-Noire, Congo
- Height: 150 cm (4 ft 11 in)
- Weight: 52 kg (115 lb)

Sport
- Sport: Athletics
- Events: 100 m, 200 m, 400 m
Medal record
Women's athletics
Representing Republic of the Congo
African Games
Bronze medal – third place	2023 Accra	200 m

Natacha Ngoye Akamabi (born 15 August 1993) is a Congolese sprinter. She won two gold medals at the 2017 Jeux de la Francophonie. She also represented her country in the 400 metres at the 2012 World Indoor Championships without advancing from the first round.

She qualified to represent Congo at the 2020 Summer Olympics.

== International competitions ==
Year	Competition	Venue	Position	Event	Notes
Representing the Republic of the Congo
2010	African Championships	Nairobi, Kenya	21st (h)	200 m	25.76
2010	African Championships	Nairobi, Kenya	28th (h)	400 m	62.01
2011	All-Africa Games	Maputo, Mozambique	16th (sf)	400 m	60.40
2012	World Indoor Championships	Istanbul, Turkey	23rd (h)	400 m	58.21
2012	African Championships	Porto-Novo, Benin	14th (sf)	200 m	24.59
2013	Jeux de la Francophonie	Nice, France	14th (h)	400 m	57.11
2014	African Championships	Marrakesh, Morocco	10th (sf)	200 m	24.06
2014	African Championships	Marrakesh, Morocco	16th (h)	400 m	55.40
2015	African Games	Brazzaville, Republic of the Congo	5th	200 m	23.61
2015	African Games	Brazzaville, Republic of the Congo	17th (h)	400 m	54.91
2015	African Games	Brazzaville, Republic of the Congo	5th	4 × 400 m relay	3:49.46
2016	African Championships	Durban, South Africa	20th (sf)	200 m	24.54 (Note: Did not finish in the semifinals)
2017	Jeux de la Francophonie	Abidjan, Ivory Coast	1st	100 m	11.56
2017	Jeux de la Francophonie	Abidjan, Ivory Coast	1st	200 m	23.69
2017	Jeux de la Francophonie	Abidjan, Ivory Coast	4th	4 × 100 m relay	46.29
2018	African Championships	Asaba, Nigeria	7th (sf)	100 m	11.97
2018	African Championships	Asaba, Nigeria	6th	200 m	23.63
2019	African Games	Rabat, Morocco	5th	100 m	11.54
2019	African Games	Rabat, Morocco	5th	200 m	23.44
2019	World Championships	Doha, Qatar	–	200 m	DQ
2021	Olympic Games	Tokyo, Japan	42nd (h)	100 m	11.52
2022	African Championships	Port Louis, Mauritius	19th (h)	100 m	11.96
2022	African Championships	Port Louis, Mauritius	8th	200 m	24.45
2023	Jeux de la Francophonie	Kinshasa, DR Congo	3rd	100 m	11.44
2023	Jeux de la Francophonie	Kinshasa, DR Congo	2nd (h)	200 m	23.01 (Note: Did not start in the semifinals)
2023	Jeux de la Francophonie	Kinshasa, DR Congo	2nd	4 × 100 m relay	45.49
2023	World Championships	Budapest, Hungary	43rd (h)	100 m	11.60
2024	African Games	Accra, Ghana	6th	100 m	11.66
2024	African Games	Accra, Ghana	3rd	200 m	23.42
2024	Olympic Games	Paris, France	41st (h)	100 m	11.36
2025	World Indoor Championships	Nanjing, China	38th (h)	60 m	7.59
2025	World Championships	Tokyo, Japan	52nd (h)	100 m	11.88
2026	World Indoor Championships	Toruń, Poland	45th (h)	60 m	7.46

== Personal bests ==
Outdoor

- 100 metres – 11.22 (+0.5 m/s, Kinshasa 2023)
- 200 metres – 23.01 (-0.2 m/s, Kinshasa 2023)
- 400 metres – 54.31 (Porto Novo 2012)

Indoor

- 400 metres – 58.21 (Istanbul 2012)

Olympic Games
Preceded by Franck Elemba	Flag bearer for Republic of the Congo; 2020 Tokyo; 2024 Paris with Freddy Mayala	Succeeded by Incumbent
