= 2010 IAAF World Indoor Championships – Women's 400 metres =

The women's 400 metres at the 2010 IAAF World Indoor Championships was held at the ASPIRE Dome on 12 and 13 March.

== Medalists ==
Gold	Silver	Bronze
Debbie Dunn; United States	Vania Stambolova; Bulgaria	Amantle Montsho; Botswana

== Records ==
Standing records prior to the 2010 IAAF World Indoor Championships
World record	Jarmila Kratochvílová (TCH)	49.59	Milan, Italy	7 March 1982
Championship record	Olesya Forsheva (RUS)	50.04	Moscow, Russia	12 March 2006
World Leading	Debbie Dunn (USA)	50.86	Albuquerque, United States	28 February 2010
African record	Charity Opara (NGR)	50.73	Stuttgart, Germany	1 February 1998
Asian record	Li Yajun (CHN)	52.27	Beijing, China	24 February 1996
European record	Jarmila Kratochvílová (TCH)	49.59	Milan, Italy	7 March 1982
North and Central American and Caribbean record	Christine Amertil (BAH)	50.34	Moscow, Russia	12 March 2006
Oceanian Record	Maree Holland (AUS)	52.17	Budapest, Hungary	4 March 1989
South American record	Aliann Pompey (GUY)	51.83	New York City, United States	26 February 2010

== Qualification standards ==
Indoor	Outdoor
53.25	51.25

== Schedule ==
Date	Time	Round
March 12, 2010	9:00	Heats
March 12, 2010	19:05	Semifinals
March 13, 2010	17:30	Final

== Results ==
=== Heats ===
Qualification: First 2 in each heat (Q) and the next 4 fastest (q) advance to the semifinals.

Rank	Heat	Name	Nationality	Time	Notes
1	1	Debbie Dunn	United States	52.24	Q
2	1	Christine Amertil	Bahamas	52.50	Q
DQ	4	Tatyana Firova	Russia	~~52.67~~	Q, Doping
4	1	Amantle Montsho	Botswana	52.72	q, NR
5	4	Novlene Williams-Mills	Jamaica	52.73	Q
6	2	Denisa Ščerbová-Rosolová	Czech Republic	52.75	Q, PB
7	2	DeeDee Trotter	United States	52.75	Q
8	2	Aliann Pompey	Guyana	52.76	q
DQ	2	Bobby-Gaye Wilkins	Jamaica	~~52.86~~	Q, Doping
9	4	Maris Mägi	Estonia	53.21	q
10	3	Natalya Nazarova	Russia	53.50	Q
11	4	Zuzana Hejnová	Czech Republic	53.56	
12	3	Vania Stambolova	Bulgaria	53.57	Q
13	1	Kou Luogon	Liberia	53.69	
14	3	Virginie Michanol	France	53.70	
15	4	Tiandra Ponteen	Saint Kitts and Nevis	53.89	
16	3	Antonina Yefremova	Ukraine	53.97	
DQ	1	Munira Saleh	Syria	~~54.53~~	Doping
17	3	Tjipekapora Herunga	Namibia	55.40	NR
18	3	Kay Khine Lwin	Myanmar	1:00.78	NR
	2	Racheal Nachula	Zambia	DNS	
	2	Klodiana Shala	Albania	DNS	

=== Semifinals ===
Qualification: First 3 in each heat (Q) advance to the final.

Rank	Heat	Name	Nationality	Time	Notes
DQ	1	Tatyana Firova	Russia	~~51.36~~	Q, Doping
2	1	Novlene Williams-Mills	Jamaica	51.77	Q, SB
3	2	Debbie Dunn	United States	52.08	Q
4	1	Aliann Pompey	Guyana	52.29	Q
5	2	Vania Stambolova	Bulgaria	52.30	Q
6	2	Amantle Montsho	Botswana	52.34	Q, NR
7	1	Christine Amertil	Bahamas	52.36	SB
8	2	Natalya Nazarova	Russia	52.47	
9	1	DeeDee Trotter	United States	52.55	
DQ	2	Bobby-Gaye Wilkins	Jamaica	~~52.59~~	Doping
10	2	Denisa Ščerbová-Rosolová	Czech Republic	52.92	
11	1	Maris Mägi	Estonia	53.30	

=== Final ===
Rank	Name	Nationality	Time	Notes
Gold medal	Debbie Dunn	United States	51.04	
Silver medal	Vania Stambolova	Bulgaria	51.50	SB
Bronze medal	Amantle Montsho	Botswana	52.53	
4	Aliann Pompey	Guyana	52.75	
	Novlene Williams-Mills	Jamaica	DNF	
DQ	Tatyana Firova	Russia	~~51.13~~	PB, Doping
