= 2012 African Championships in Athletics – Women's 4 × 400 metres relay =

The women's 4 × 400 metres relay at the 2012 African Championships in Athletics was held at the Stade Charles de Gaulle on 1 July.

== Medalists ==
Gold	Endurance Abinuwa, Omolara Omotosho; Margaret Etim, Bukola Abogunloko; Nigeria
Silver	Goitseone Seleka, Lydia Mashila; Oarabile Babolayi, Amantle Montsho; Botswana
Bronze	Mame Fatou Faye, Amy Mbacké Thiam; Fatou Diabaye, Ndeye Fatou Soumah; Senegal

== Records ==
Standing records prior to the 2012 African Championships in Athletics
World record	Soviet Union; Tatyana Ledovskaya, Olga Nazarova; Mariya Pinigina, Olha Bryzhina	3:15.17	Seoul, South Korea	1 October 1988
African record	Nigeria; Olabisi Afolabi, Fatima Yusuf; Charity Opara, Falilat Ogunkoya	3:21.04	Atlanta, United States	3 August 1996
Championship record	Nigeria; Shade Abugan, Margaret Etim; Bukola Abogunloko, Muizat Ajoke Odumosu	3:29.26	Nairobi, Kenya	1 August 2010
Broken records during the 2012 African Championships in Athletics
Championship record	Nigeria; Endurance Abinuwa, Omolara Omotosho; Margaret Etim, Bukola Abogunloko	3:28.77	Porto-Novo, Benin	1 July 2012

== Schedule ==
Date	Time	Round
1 July 2012	17:15	Final

== Results ==
=== Final ===
Rank	Lane	Nation	Athletes	Time	Notes
1st place, gold medalist(s)	8	Nigeria	Endurance Abinuwa, Omolara Omotosho, Margaret Etim, Bukola Abogunloko	3:28.77	CR
2nd place, silver medalist(s)	6	Botswana	Goitseone Seleka, Lydia Mashila, Oarabile Babolayi, Amantle Montsho	3:31.27	NR
3rd place, bronze medalist(s)	7	Senegal	Mame Fatou Faye, Amy Mbacké Thiam, Fatou Diabaye, Ndeye Fatou Soumah	3:31.64	
4	4	South Africa	Rorisang Ramonnye, Estie Wittstock, Tsholofelo Thipe, Wenda Theron	3:33.21	
5	3	Liberia	Phobay Kutu-Akoi, Raasin McIntosh, Angele Cooper, Kou Luogon	3:33.24	NR
6	1	Kenya	Joyce Sakari, Catherine Nandi, Grace Kidake, Maureen Jelagat	3:35.06	
7	2	Ethiopia	Tigst Assefa, Wesene Belay, Mariet Mulugeta, Salam Abrhaley	3:41.10	
8	5	Ghana	Yvonne Amegashie, Jacqueline Ado Bludo, Rebecca Amponsah, Adelaide Nkrumah	3:41.46	
