= 2013 African Junior Athletics Championships =

XI African Junior Athletics Championships
- Dates: 29 August – 1 September
- Host city: Bambous, Mauritius
- Venue: Germain Comarmond Stadium
- Level: Junior
- Events: 40
- Participation: 223 athletes from 29 nations
- Records set: 2 championship records

The 2013 African Junior Athletics Championships was the eleventh edition of the biennial, continental athletics tournament for African athletes aged 19 years or younger. It was held at the Germain Comarmond Stadium in Bambous, Mauritius from 29 August – 1 September. A total of 223 athletes from 29 nations competed. Neither pole vault event was held, due to a lack of entries, and the decathlon and heptathlon competitions were also not contested.

Originally scheduled to be held in South Africa, a dispute between Athletics South Africa and the national sports ministry resulted in the cancellation of holding rights in June 2013. Bambous, the 2009 host, stepped in at short notice to hold the event.

The medal table was a closely contested affair. Nigeria had the most gold medals with nine in its haul of 19 medals. South Africa had seven golds, but had the highest overall total with 24 medals. Ethiopia also had seven golds, and had the second highest medal haul with 22. Egypt (five golds, 11 in total) and Kenya (four golds, 17 in total) were the next best performing nations. Of the 29 participating nations, 15 reached the medal table. Nigeria performed well in the sprinting events, Ethiopia and Kenya shared most of the middle- and long-distance running medals, while South Africa and Egypt took many medals in the field events.

Wind affected most of the sprints and jumps events, slowing the track times and carrying the jumpers to further distances. Two championship records were improved during the competition: Sabelo Ntokozo Ndlovu cleared 15.92 m (52 ft 2 3/4 in) in the men's triple jump and Ahmed Hassan set a new standard of 19.59 m (64 ft 3 1/4 in) in the men's shot put.

Several athletes won multiple individual medals. Among them, Martin Moses Kurong was the men's 10,000 m winner and 5000 m bronze medallist, Geraldine Ann Duvenhage and Mohamed Kalifa were double silver medallists in the men's and women's shot put and discus throw events, and Tegest Tamangnu Yuma was runner-up in both the women's short sprints. South Africa's Duwayne Boer was the long jump winner and took bronze in the triple jump. Nigeria's Ese Brume was the women's long jump winner and triple jump runner-up, as well as a gold medallist in the 4×100 metres relay. South Africa's Megan Wilke won the javelin throw and surprisingly she also took the high jump silver medal.

Nigeria's 200 m champion, Divine Oduduru, progressed to the junior level after his sprint double at the 2013 African Youth Athletics Championships. The Ethiopian duo Tigist Gashaw and Dawit Seyaum were first and second in the women's 1500 metres, switching their placings from the 2013 World Youth Championships in Athletics.

== Medal summary ==
=== Men ===
Event	Gold		Silver		Bronze	
100 metres	Harry Chukwudike (NGR)	10.54	Mamus Emuobonuvie (NGR)	10.58	Jonathan Permal (MRI)	10.65
200 metres (Wind: −3.6 m/s)	Divine Oduduru (NGR)	21.19	Jonathan Permal (MRI)	21.26	Fana James Mokofeng (RSA)	21.62
400 metres	Denis Opio (UGA)	46.94	Omeiza Akerele (NGR)	47.32	Mohamed Belbachir (ALG)	47.40
800 metres	Berke Kahsay (ETH)	1:46.94	Jonathan Kitilit (KEN)	1:48.03	Nader Belhanbel (MAR)	1:48.49
1500 metres	Mathew Kiptanui (KEN)	3:39.91	John Maina (KEN)	3:42.31	Chalachew Shemeles (ETH)	3:42.45
5000 metres	Moses Mukono (KEN)	13:54.36	Abdallah Kibet Mande (UGA)	13:55.10	Martin Moses Kurong (UGA)	13:56.39
10,000 metres	Martin Moses Kurong (UGA)	28:31.80	Elvis Cheboi (KEN)	28:36.28	Josephat Kiprop (KEN)	28:37.09
110 metres hurdles (Wind: −3.6 m/s)	Mohamed Koussi (MAR)	14.14	Tiaan Smit (RSA)	14.30	Behailu Alemshet (ETH)	14.57
400 metres hurdles	Constant Pretorius (RSA)	51.08	Kenneth Kurui (KEN)	52.65	Orwin Emilien (MRI)	53.18
3000 metres steeplechase	Festus Kiprono (KEN)	8:38.99	Zewdu Molla (ETH)	8:51.73	Gigsa Tolosa (ETH)	8:55.38
4×100 metres relay	Nigeria (NGR); Mamus Emuobonuvie; Tega Odele; Divine Oduduru; Harry Chukwudike	40.36	Mauritius (MRI); Jean-Yann de Grace; Jonathan Permal; Orwin Emilien; Julien Meunier	40.86	South Africa (RSA); Keenan Michau; Walter Ungerer; Fana James Mokofeng; Wesley Pinidele	41.01
4×400 metres relay	Nigeria (NGR); Adedamola Adenui; Charles Okezie; Ugochukwu Ottah; Omeiza Akerele	3:14.50	Gambia (GAM); Wandifa Sanneth; Ebrahima Camara; Omar Jammeh; Tijan Keita	3:14.76	Ethiopia (ETH); Fikre Muluken; Mohammed Gemechu; Alemayehu Abera; Chala Abebe	3:15.08
10,000 m walk	Aymene Sabri (ALG)	45:58.52	Getamesay Nigusse (ETH)	46:07.94	Abdessamie Saidani (ALG)	47:21.24
High jump	Omar Kaseb (EGY)	2.11 m	Theddus Okpara (NGR)	2.05 m	Heath Takudzwa Muchichwa (ZIM)	2.00 m
Long jump	Duwayne Andrew Boer (RSA)	7.58 m (w)	Babajide Okulaja (NGR)	7.42 m (w)	Ruto Kiplagat (KEN)	7.28 m
Triple jump	Sabelo Ntokozo Ndlovu (RSA)	15.92 m CR	Ruto Kiplagat (KEN)	15.43 m	Duwayne Andrew Boer (RSA)	15.13 m
Shot put	Mostafa Amr Hassan (EGY)	19.59 m CR	Mohamed Kalifa (EGY)	19.05 m	Ruan Combrinck (RSA)	17.08 m
Discus throw	Gerhard De Beer (RSA)	55.58 m	Mohamed Kalifa (EGY)	50.98 m	Ahmed Elghobashy (EGY)	50.28 m
Hammer throw	Eslam Ibrahim (EGY)	74.49 m	Hisham Loufti Abd El Wahab (EGY)	61.74 m	Dean William (SEY)	52.29 m
Javelin throw	Alex Kiprotich (KEN)	71.43 m	Reinhard Vanzyl (RSA)	69.73 m	Maged Mohsen El Amer (EGY)	69.40 m

=== Women ===
Event	Gold		Silver		Bronze	
100 metres	Thebogo Mamathu (RSA)	11.98	Tegest Tamangnu (ETH)	12.12	Philippa Van Der Merve (RSA)	12.16
200 metres (Wind: −3.5 m/s)	Nkiruka Uwakwe (NGR)	24.21	Tegest Tamangnu (ETH)	24.27	Loungo Matihaku (BOT)	24.62
400 metres	Ada Benjamin (NGR)	52.87	Rita Ossai (NGR)	53.84	Selam Abrhaley (ETH)	54.80
800 metres	Alem Gereziher (ETH)	2:03.78	Agatha Kimaswai (KEN)	2:04.91	Tigst Assefa (ETH)	2:05.65
1500 metres	Dawit Seyaum (ETH)	4:09.00	Tigist Gashaw (ETH)	4:12.38	Sheila Chepnegetich (KEN)	4:13.15
3000 metres	Haftamnesh Tesfay (ETH)	9:32.33	Sheila Chepnegetich (KEN)	9:32.97	Roman Giday (ETH)	9:36.41
5000 metres	Ruti Aga (ETH)	16:00.98	Lina Cheruto (KEN)	16:04.34	Alemitu Heroye (ETH)	16:08.85
100 metres hurdles (Wind: −2.8 m/s)	Marthe Koala (BUR)	14.09	Favour Efe (NGR)	14.53	Mercia Ventea (RSA)	15.04
400 metres hurdles	Dihia Haddar (ALG)	58.82	Meaza Kebede (ETH)	1:01.21	Daisy Akpofa (NGR)	1:01.34
3000 metres steeplechase	Weynshet Ansa (ETH)	9:59.46	Marion Jepkonga Kibor (KEN)	10:02.46	Lina Cheruto (KEN)	10:03.74
4×100 metres relay	Nigeria (NGR); Nkiruka Uwakwe; Ese Brume; Margaret Bolufawi; Nkem Ezealah	46.28	South Africa (RSA); Mercia Ventea; Philippa Van Der Merve; Stacey Welsch; Thebogo Mamathu	47.56	Not awarded^{†}	
4×400 metres relay	Nigeria (NGR); Nkiruka Uwakwe; Ada Benjamn; Abike Egbeniyi; Rita Ossai	3:37.93	Ethiopia (ETH); Selam Abrhaley; Tigst Assefa; Mahlet Mulugeta; Alem Gereziher	3:42.18	South Africa (RSA); Lezaan Jordaan; Philippa Van Der Merve; Janet Seeliger; Izelle Neuhoff	3:57.78
5000 m walk	Askale Tiksa (ETH)	25:30.90	Anel Opsthuizen (RSA)	25:39.44	Sarah Loveth Malagu (NGR)	26:16.53
High jump	Rhizlane Siba (MAR)	1.75 m	Megan Wilke (RSA)	1.60 m	Anna Milizar (MRI)	1.60 m
Long jump	Ese Brume (NGR)	6.33 m (w)^{‡}	Janet Seeliger (RSA)	6.00 m	Marthe Koala (BUR)	5.60 m (w)
Triple jump	Lerato Sechele (LES)	12.62 m (w)	Ese Brume (NGR)	12.52 m (w)	Amira Bendrif (MAR)	12.16 m (w)
Shot put	Lezaan Jordaan (RSA)	15.07 m	Geraldine Ann Duvenhage (RSA)	13.47 m	Juditha Aniefuna (NGR)	13.26 m
Discus throw	Fadya El Kasaby (EGY)	42.71 m	Geraldine Ann Duvenhage (RSA)	42.00 m	Marie Helen Rose (SEY)	28.03 m
Hammer throw	Aya Ebrahem Adly (EGY)	53.88 m	Chene Margo Coetzee (RSA)	49.66 m	Yasmine Talbi (ALG)	48.95 m
Javelin throw	Megan Wilke (RSA)	47.42 m	Seba Bassem El Sehily (EGY)	47.29 m	Zandri Bailey (RSA)	46.30 m

- ^{†} A third team from Mauritius was present in the women's 4 × 100 m relay but failed to finish the race.
- ^{‡} Long jump winner Ese Brume also had a wind-legal jump of 6.22 metres.

== Medal table ==
* Host nation (Mauritius)

Rank	Nation	Gold	Silver	Bronze	Total
1	Nigeria	9	7	3	19
2	South Africa	7	9	8	24
3	Ethiopia	7	7	8	22
4	Egypt	5	4	2	11
5	Kenya	4	9	4	17
6	Uganda	2	1	1	4
7	Algeria	2	0	3	5
8	Morocco	2	0	2	4
9	Burkina Faso	1	0	1	2
10	Lesotho	1	0	0	1
11	Mauritius*	0	2	3	5
12	Gambia	0	1	0	1
13	Seychelles	0	0	2	2
14	Botswana	0	0	1	1
14	Zimbabwe	0	0	1	1
Totals (15 entries)		40	40	39	119

== Participation ==
- Algeria (10)
- Angola (2)
- Botswana (6)
- Burkina Faso (2)
- Democratic Republic of the Congo (1)
- Egypt (11)
- Eritrea (5)
- Ethiopia (41)
- Gabon (3)
- Gambia (6)
- Kenya (20)
- Lesotho (1)
- Liberia (1)
- Libya (1)
- Madagascar (1)
- Mauritius (21)
- Morocco (8)
- Mozambique (3)
- Namibia (3)
- Nigeria (22)
- Rwanda (1)
- Senegal (4)
- Seychelles (3)
- South Africa (29)
- Swaziland (1)
- Tunisia (1)
- Uganda (4)
- Zambia (4)
- Zimbabwe (8)
