= 2026 Berlin Marathon =

42.195 km (26.2 mi) race in Germany

52nd Berlin Marathon
- Location: Berlin, Germany
- Dates: 27 September 2026
- Website: https://www.bmw-berlin-marathon.com

Champions
- Men: Guye Adola (2:02:50)
- Women: Tigst Assefa (2:11:04)
- Wheelchair men: Marcel Hug (1:23:28)
- Wheelchair women: Catherine Debrunner (1:35:01)

The 2026 Berlin Marathon was the 52nd edition of the annual marathon race in Berlin, held on Sunday, September 27, 2026. A Platinum Label marathon, it was one of the six World Marathon Majors events scheduled for 2026.

Ethiopian runner Tigst Assefa won the women's race running the 3rd all-time best marathon time and a course record of 2:11:04 despite acquiring an injury which forced her to adopt a visible limp in the final two kilometers. In the men's race, the 2021 Berlin marathon champion Guye Adola ran a personal best to capture his second title in the event. Swiss wheelchair athletes Marcel Hug and Catherine Debrunner won their respective races.

== Competitors ==
Defending champion Sabastian Sawe was forced to withdraw from the event due to injury a month out from the race. A few days prior, former champion Kenenisa Bekele was also forced to withdraw due to an Achilles injury. In the women's race, Esther Pfeiffer was aiming to break the German women's national record set by Irina Mikitenko in 2008 but was forced to withdraw mid-race due to physical conditions.

== Results ==
Results for the top ten in the running races and top five in the wheelchair races are listed below.

Men's race result
Position	Athlete	Nationality	Time
1st place, gold medalist(s)	Guye Adola	Ethiopia	2:02:50
2nd place, silver medalist(s)	Gemechu Dida	Ethiopia	2:03:19
3rd place, bronze medalist(s)	Gabriel Geay	Tanzania	2:03:59
4	Getaneh Molla	Ethiopia	2:04:55
5	Selemon Barega	Ethiopia	2:04:58
6	Asefa Boki	Ethiopia	2:05:32
7	Andamlak Belihu	Ethiopia	2:05:55
8	Shura Kitata	Ethiopia	2:06:04
9	Yuhei Urano	Japan	2:06:09
10	Tadu Abate	Ethiopia	2:07:16

Women's race result
Position	Athlete	Nationality	Time
1st place, gold medalist(s)	Tigst Assefa	Ethiopia	2:11:04
2nd place, silver medalist(s)	Bedatu Hirpa	Ethiopia	2:16:53
3rd place, bronze medalist(s)	Dera Dida	Ethiopia	2:16:55
4	Bekelech Gudeta	Ethiopia	2:18:58
5	Alemitu Tariku	Ethiopia	2:19:01
6	Pascaline Jelagat	Kenya	2:20:23
7	Misgane Alemayehu	Ethiopia	2:20:27
8	Ludwina Chepngetich	Kenya	2:21:25
9	Evaline Chirchir	Kenya	2:21:32
10	Aminet Ahmed	Ethiopia	2:21:45

Wheelchair men's race result
Position	Athlete	Nationality	Time
1st place, gold medalist(s)	Marcel Hug	Switzerland	1:23:28
2nd place, silver medalist(s)	Sho Watanabe	Japan	1:29:26
3rd place, bronze medalist(s)	Lito Anker	Netherlands	1:29:26
4	Ludwig Malter	Austria	1:29:27
5	Geert Schipper	Netherlands	1:29:29

Wheelchair women's race result
Position	Athlete	Nationality	Time
1st place, gold medalist(s)	Catherine Debrunner	Switzerland	1:35:01
2nd place, silver medalist(s)	Manuela Schär	Switzerland	1:41:53
3rd place, bronze medalist(s)	Eden Rainbow-Cooper	United Kingdom	1:44:51
4	Melanie Woods	United Kingdom	1:47:00
5	Vanessa De Souza	Brazil	1:47:01

== See also ==
- World Marathon Majors
- List of marathon races
- List of World Athletics Label marathon races
