= Amantle Montsho =

Botswana sprinter (born 1983)

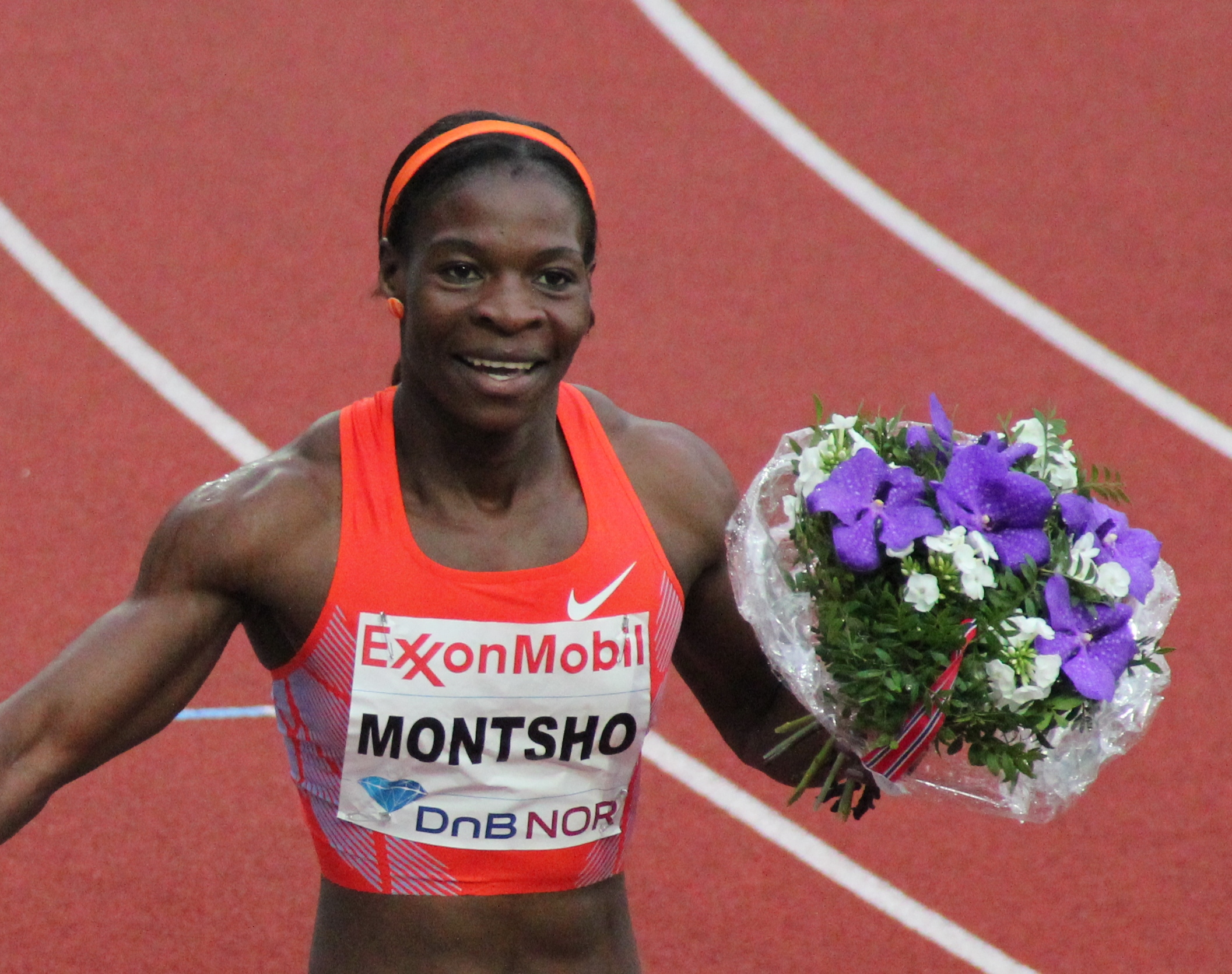
- Amantle Montsho at the 2011 Bislett Games

Personal information
- Nationality: Botswana
- Born: July 4, 1983 (age 43)

Sport
- Sport: Track and field
- Event: 400 meters

Achievements and titles
- Personal bests: 100 m: 11.60 s 200 m: 22.89 s 400 m: 49.33 s (Monaco, 2013)
Medal record
Women's athletics
Representing Botswana
World Championships
Gold medal – first place	2011 Daegu	400 m
Silver medal – second place	2013 Moscow	400 m
World Indoor Championships
Bronze medal – third place	2010 Doha	400 m
Commonwealth Games
Gold medal – first place	2010 Delhi	400 m
Gold medal – first place	2018 Gold Coast	400 m
African Championships
Gold medal – first place	2008 Addis Ababa	400 m
Gold medal – first place	2010 Nairobi	400 m
Gold medal – first place	2012 Porto-Novo	400 m
Silver medal – second place	2006 Bambous	400 m
Silver medal – second place	2012 Porto-Novo	4 × 400 m
All-Africa Games
Gold medal – first place	2007 Algiers	400 m
Gold medal – first place	2011 Maputo	400 m

Amantle Montsho (born July 4, 1983) is a Botswana former sprinter who specialized in the 400 metres. She represented her country at the 2004 and 2008 Summer Olympics, reaching the final at the latter edition. She was the first woman to represent Botswana at the Olympics. She also competed at the World Championships in Athletics and the IAAF World Indoor Championships, and was the former World Champion over the 400 m, winning in a personal best time of 49.56 in Daegu.

Montsho was suspended for two years for an anti-doping rule violation after she tested positive for methylhexaneamine at the 2014 Commonwealth Games.

A two-time African Championships gold medallist over 400 m, she has also won titles in the event at the 2007 All-Africa Games, the 2010 IAAF Continental Cup and the 2010 Commonwealth Games. Her Commonwealth win made her Botswana's first-ever gold medallist of the games.

Her personal best times are 11.60 seconds in the 100 m, 22.89 seconds in the 200 m, and 49.33 seconds in the 400 m. She trains at the High Performance Training Centre in Dakar, Senegal, and She holds the national record for the 400 m both indoors and outdoors.

== Career ==
Montsho was born in Maun, Ngamiland. She has competed at the 2004 Olympic Games, the 2006 Commonwealth Games and the World Championships in 2005 and 2007 without reaching the finals.

She won the silver medal at the 2006 African Championships and the gold medal at the 2007 All-Africa Games. At the All-Africa Games, she also finished fifth in the 200 metres. At the 2006 IAAF World Cup she finished sixth with the African 4 × 400 metres relay team. She ran a personal best and Botswana record of 49.83 seconds to win at the 2008 African Championships in Athletics. It remains the Championship record for the event.

She ran at the 2008 IAAF World Indoor Championships but did not reach the final after a poor showing in the semifinal. Montsho reached her first world final at the 2008 Beijing Olympics, but her time of 51.18 left her in the last position. The following year, she ran 49.89 in the semifinals at the 2009 World Championships in Athletics, which was enough to make the final round of the 400 m. She ran slower in the final than in the semis and finished last. She ended the year with a fifth-place finish at the 2009 IAAF World Athletics Final.

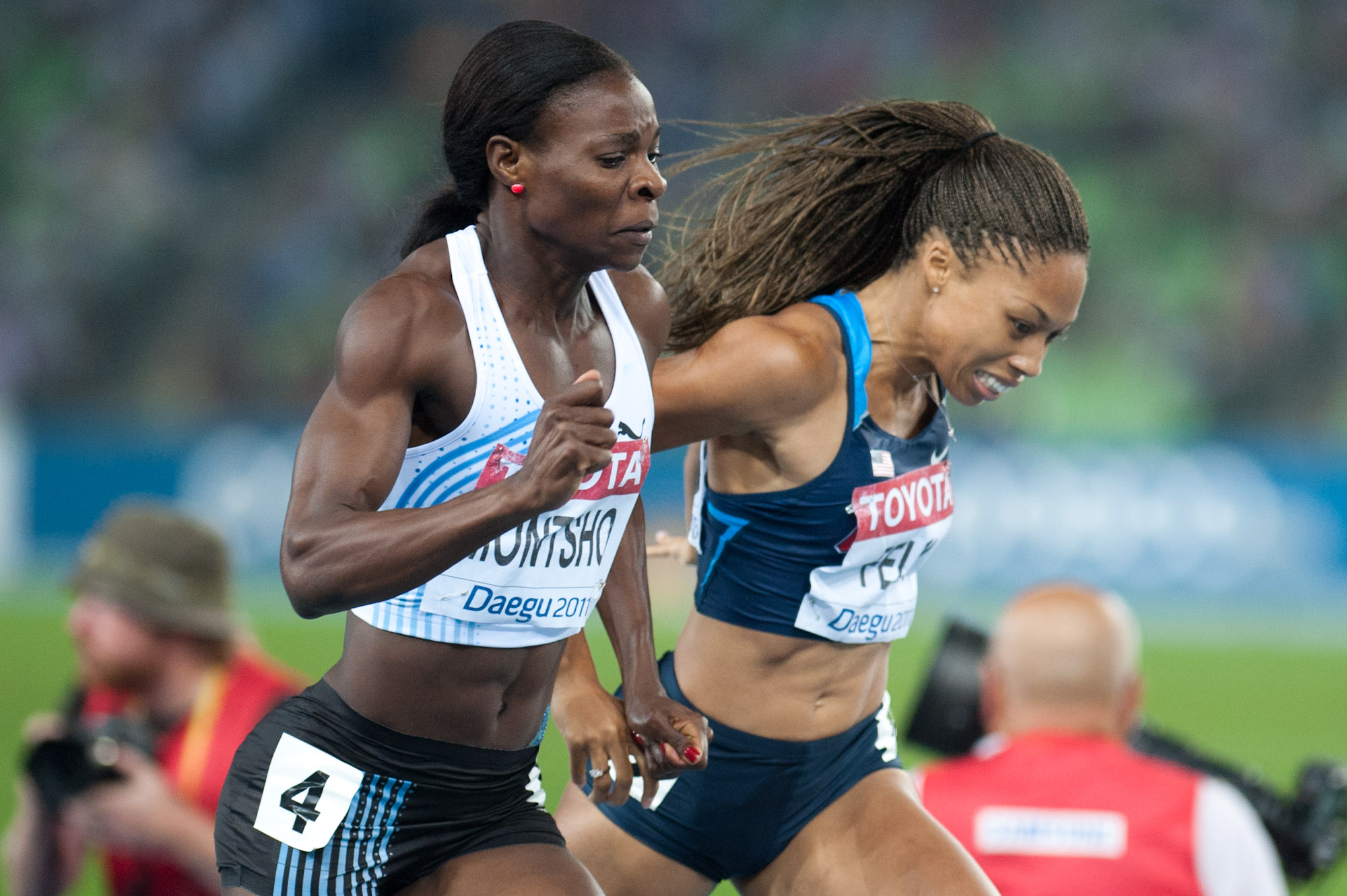
Amantle Montsho narrowly defeated Allyson Felix to become Botswana's first World or Olympic track and field champion in 2011.

The 2010 season brought her a series of major titles: she came close to the podium at the 2010 IAAF World Indoor Championships: having set indoor national records in the heats and semi-finals, she was beaten to the bronze medal by Vania Stambolova. She opened her outdoor season with her third fastest ever 400 m run, winning the Gabriel Tiacoh meet in a time of 50.35 seconds – almost two seconds ahead of her training partner Ndeye Fatou Soumah who was next to finish. She defended her continental title by winning the 400 m at the 2010 African Championships in Athletics with a season's best run of 50.03 seconds.

On the 2010 Diamond League circuit, she won at the Bislett Games and was ranked second overall in the 400 m behind Allyson Felix. Montsho ran her fastest time of the year at the 2010 Continental Cup where, representing Africa, she beat Debbie Dunn to win the gold medal in 49.89 seconds. She extended her season further to compete at the 2010 Commonwealth Games. There she became Botswana's first-ever gold medallist at the Games by winning the 400 m with a Games record time of 50.10 seconds. She then helped the Botswana team to the 4 × 400 m relay final, but they finished in seventh place.

At the 2011 World Championships in Athletics in South Korea, in the 400 metres final, she narrowly beat Allyson Felix to become Botswana's first World or Olympic track and field champion.

At the 2012 Olympics final she placed 4th with 49.75 seconds.

At the 2013 World Championships in Athletics in Moscow, she was run down in the final metres by Christine Ohuruogu of the 400 metres final, losing by just four-thousandths of a second when Ohuruogu dipped and Montsho remained upright.

She won a gold medal at the 2018 Commonwealth Games in Gold Coast, Queensland, Australia when she and fellow athlete Isaac Makwala made history by being the first athletes from the same country to win both the 400 m women and mens in the same Commonwealth Games event.

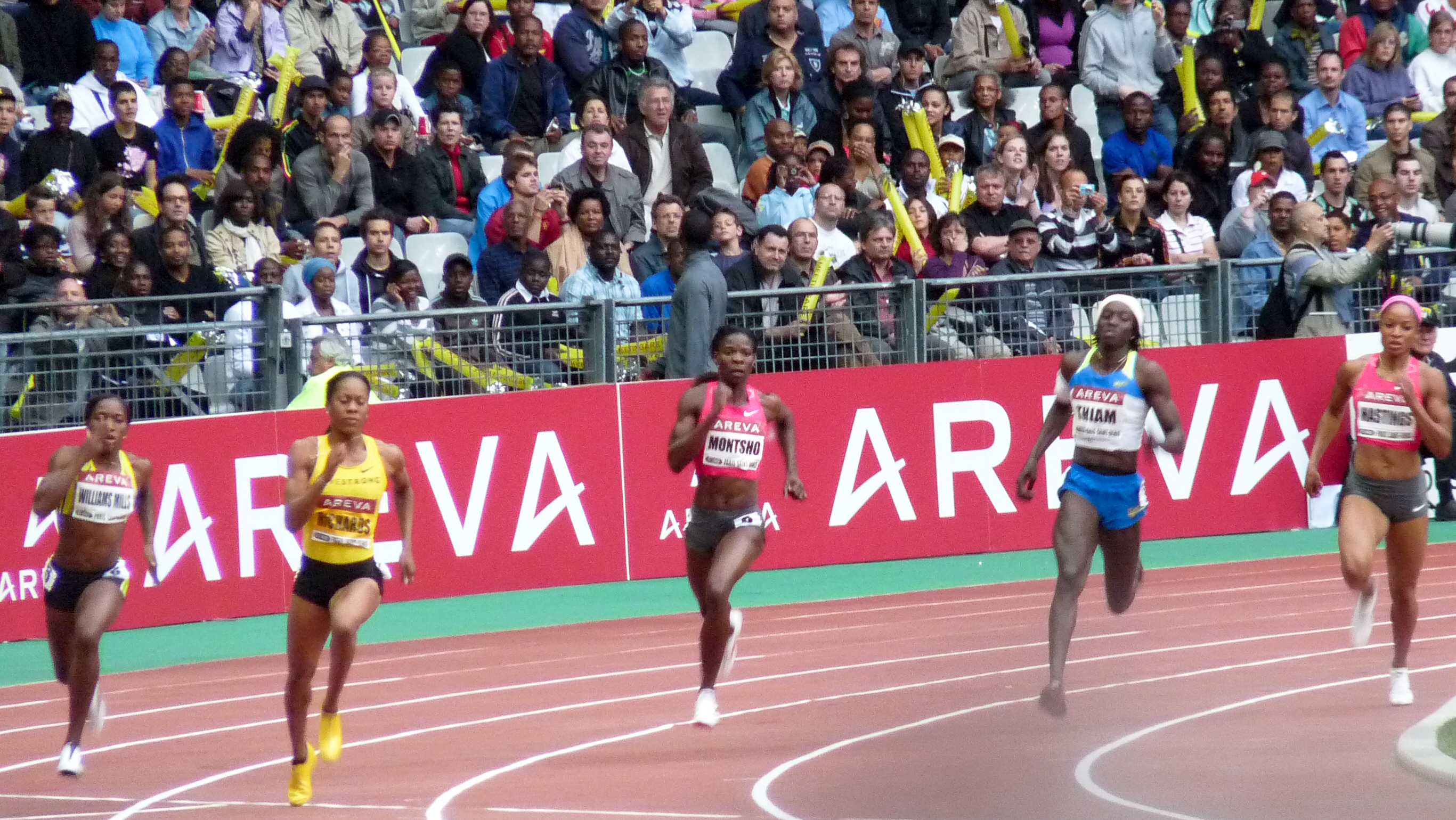

== Doping ban ==
At the 2014 Commonwealth Games, Montsho failed a routine drugs test. Subsequently, this finding was confirmed by the results of her 'B' sample which also tested positive for the stimulant methylhexanamine. In March 2015 Botswana Athletics Association handed her a 2-year ban from sports.

== Education ==
Amantle Montsho has schooled in Bonatla Primary School in Maun.

== International competitions ==
Year	Competition	Venue	Position	Event	Notes
Representing Botswana
2003	All-Africa Games	Abuja, Nigeria	14th (h)	400 m	55.06
2004	African Championships	Brazzaville, Republic of the Congo	11th (h)	400 m	54.06
2004	Olympic Games	Athens, Greece	36th (h)	400 m	53.77 (NR)
2005	World Championships	Helsinki, Finland	40th (h)	400 m	53.97
2006	Commonwealth Games	Melbourne, Australia	15th (sf)	400 m	53.07
2006	African Championships	Bambous, Mauritius	2nd	400 m	52.68
2007	All-Africa Games	Algiers, Algeria	5th	200 m	23.71
2007	All-Africa Games	Algiers, Algeria	1st	400 m	51.13 (NR)
2007	World Championships	Osaka, Japan	12th (sf)	400 m	50.90 (NR)
2008	World Indoor Championships	Valencia, Spain	8th (sf)	400 m	53.21
2008	African Championships	Addis Ababa, Ethiopia	1st	400 m	49.83 (CR)
2008	Olympic Games	Beijing, China	8th	400 m	51.18
2009	World Championships	Berlin, Germany	8th	400 m	50.65
2010	World Indoor Championships	Doha, Qatar	3rd	400 m	52.53
2010	African Championships	Nairobi, Kenya	1st	400 m	50.03
2010	Continental Cup	Split, Croatia	1st	400 m	49.89
2010	Commonwealth Games	New Delhi, India	1st	400 m	50.10
2010	Commonwealth Games	New Delhi, India	6th	4 × 400 m relay	3:38.44
2011	World Championships	Daegu, South Korea	1st	400 m	49.56 (NR)
2011	All-Africa Games	Maputo, Mozambique	1st	400 m	50.87
2012	African Championships	Porto-Novo, Benin	1st	400 m	49.54
2012	African Championships	Porto-Novo, Benin	2nd	4 × 400 m relay	3:31.27 (NR)
2012	Olympic Games	London, United Kingdom	4th	400 m	49.75
2013	World Championships	Moscow, Russia	2nd	400 m	49.41
2013	World Championships	Moscow, Russia	16th (h)	4 × 400 m relay	3:38.96
2017	World Championships	London, United Kingdom	11th (sf)	400 m	51.28
2017	World Championships	London, United Kingdom	7th	4 × 400 m relay	3:28.00
2018	Commonwealth Games	Gold Coast, Australia	1st	400 m	50.15
2018	Commonwealth Games	Gold Coast, Australia	3rd	4 × 400 m relay	3:26.86
2019	African Games	Rabat, Morocco	2nd	4 × 400 m relay	3:31.96
2021	World Relays	Chorzów, Poland	11th (h)	4 × 400 m relay	3:34.99
2021	Olympic Games	Tokyo, Japan	–	400 m	DNF

Olympic Games
Preceded by Samantha Paxinos	Flagbearer for Botswana; London 2012	Succeeded by Nijel Amos
Preceded by Nijel Amos	Flagbearer for Botswana; Tokyo 2020 with Rajab Mahommed	Succeeded by Letsile Tebogo; Maxine Egner
