= Bedatu Hirpa =

Ethiopian long-distance runner and marathon winner

Personal information
- Nationality: Ethiopian
- Born: 28 April 1999 (age 27)

Sport
- Sport: Athletics
- Events: Long-distance running, Marathon
Medal record
Women's athletics
Representing Ethiopia
World Marathon Majors
Silver medal – second place	2026 Berlin	Marathon

Bedatu Hirpa (born 28 April 1999) is an Ethiopian long-distance runner who competes in marathon and half marathon events. She is a former World U18 champion in the 1500 metres.

== Career ==
Bedatu Hirpa's career began with success on the track, notably winning the 1500 metres at the IAAF World Youth Championships in Cali, Colombia, with a time of 4:12.92.

She transitioned to road running, making her marathon debut in 2017, where she finished third at the Madrid Marathon with a time of 2:34:47. Later that year, she won the Athens Marathon. In 2018, Hirpa continued to achieve podium finishes, placing third at both the Sevilla Marathon and the Frankfurt Marathon, where she recorded a time of 2:21:32.

In 2019, she finished fifth at the Tokyo Marathon with a time of 2:23:43 and won the Shanghai Half Marathon, setting her personal best in the distance at 1:12:11.

Her career saw significant resurgence in 2024 and 2025. In 2024, she notably won both the Prague Marathon and the Riyadh Marathon. In January 2025, Hirpa claimed victory at the Dubai Marathon, clocking a new personal best in the marathon of 2:18:27. A few months later, in April 2025, she won the Paris Marathon (Schneider Electric Marathon de Paris) with a time of 2:20:45, marking her second major marathon victory of the year.

== Personal bests ==
- Marathon – 2:16:53 (Berlin, 27 September 2026)
- Half Marathon – 1:12:11 (Shanghai, 21 April 2019)
- 1500 Metres – 4:12.92 (Cali, 18 July 2015)
