= Asefa Boki =

Ethiopian long-distance runner (born 1997)

Personal information
- Full name: Asefa Boki Kebede
- Born: 26 September 1997 (age 29)

Sport
- Country: Ethiopia
- Sport: Long-distance running
- Events: Marathon, Half marathon
- Team: Elite Running Team

Achievements and titles
- Personal bests: Half marathon: 1:01:50 (Meishan 2025); Marathon: 2:05:32 (Berlin 2026)

Asefa Boki Kebede (born 3 June 1999) is an Ethiopian long-distance runner who specializes in the Marathon and Half marathon distances.

He won the Xiamen Marathon in 2024 to claim his first Platinum label road race title and finished off the same year placing second in the Amsterdam Marathon. He followed up his Xiamen victory with a bronze medal the following year as well in the same event as well as claiming gold in the Kunming Marathon. In 2026, he placed 2nd in the Doha Marathon and then made his marathon major debut at the 2026 Berlin Marathon where he placed 6th.
