= Fantu Magiso =

Ethiopian middle-distance runner

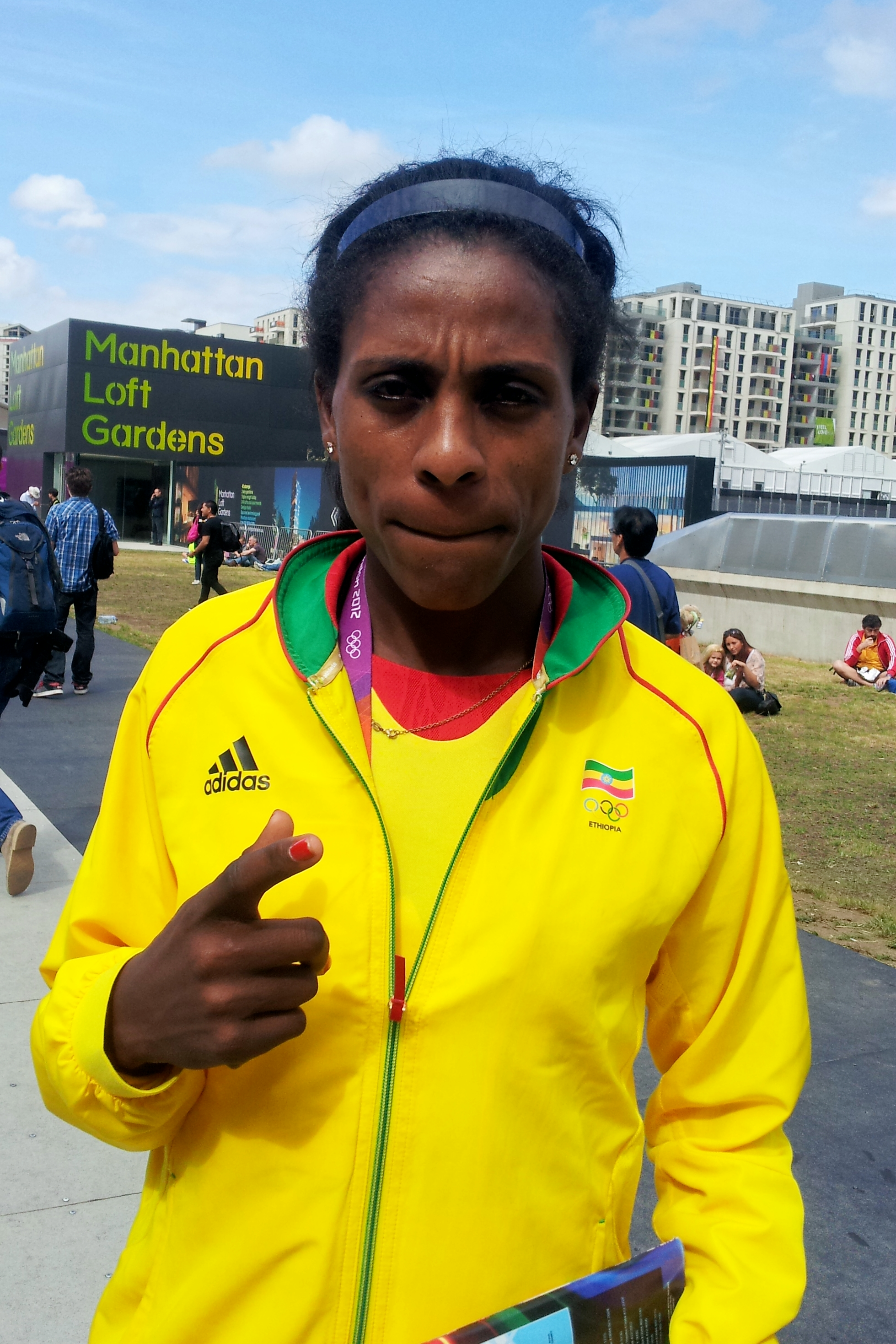
- Magiso at the 2012 London Summer Olympics

Personal information
- Born: 9 June 1992 (age 34)
- Height: 1.78 m (5 ft 10 in)
- Weight: 60 kg (132 lb)

Sport
- Country: Ethiopia
- Sport: Athletics
- Events: 400 metres and 800 metres

Fantu Magiso Manedo (born 9 June 1992) is an Ethiopian runner who specializes in the 400 metres and 800 metres.

== Achievements ==
| Year | Competition | Venue | Position | Event | Notes |
Representing Ethiopia
| 2010 | African Championships | Nairobi, Kenya | 10th (sf) | 200 m | 24.45 |
| 2010 | African Championships | Nairobi, Kenya | 24th (h) | 400 m | 58.32 |
| 2010 | African Championships | Nairobi, Kenya | 4th | 4 × 100 m relay | 46.46 |
| 2010 | African Championships | Nairobi, Kenya | 5th | 4 × 400 m relay | 3:40.44 |
| 2011 | African Junior Championships | Gaborone, Botswana | 2nd | 200 m | 23.90 (NR) |
| 2011 | African Junior Championships | Gaborone, Botswana | 1st | 400 m | 52.09 |
| 2011 | African Junior Championships | Gaborone, Botswana | 3rd | 4 × 400 m relay | 3:39.82 (NR) |
| 2011 | World Championships | Daegu, South Korea | 23rd (sf) | 400 m | 53.41 |
| 2011 | World Championships | Daegu, South Korea | 10th (sf) | 800 m | 1:59.17 |
| 2011 | All-Africa Games | Maputo, Mozambique | 2nd | 800 m | 2:03.22 |
| 2012 | World Indoor Championships | Istanbul, Turkey | 4th | 800 m | 2:00.30 |
| 2013 | World Championships | Moscow, Russia | 20th (h) | 800 m | 2:01.11 |
| 2014 | African Championships | Marrakesh, Morocco | 21st (h) | 400 m | 58.27 |
| 2014 | African Championships | Marrakesh, Morocco | 6th | 4 × 400 m relay | 3:46.91 |
