= Amy Mbacké Thiam =

Senegalese sprinter

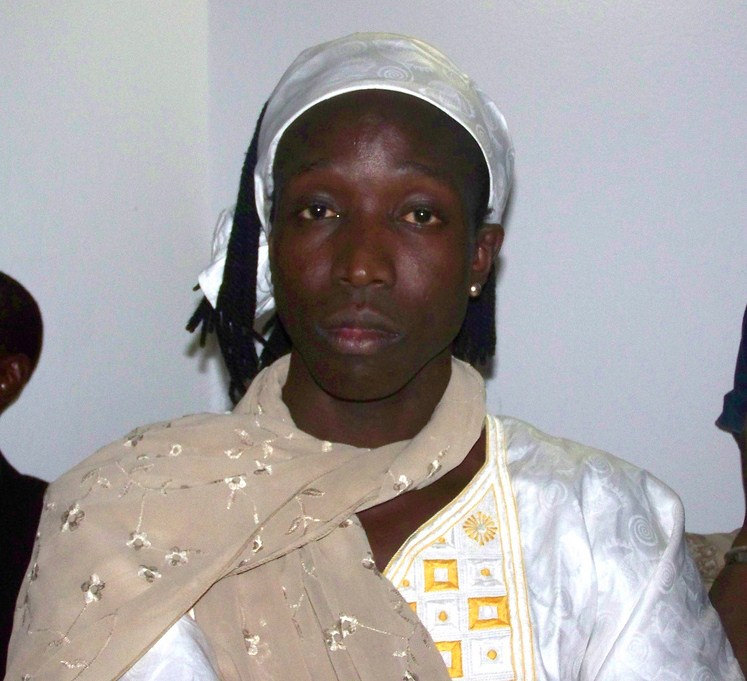

Personal information
- Born: November 10, 1976 (age 49)
- Height: 1.85 m (6 ft 1 in)
- Weight: 80 kg (176 lb)

Sport
- Country: Senegal
- Sport: Athletics
- Event: 400m
Medal record
Women's athletics
Representing Senegal
World Championships
Gold medal – first place	2001 Edmonton	400 m
Bronze medal – third place	2003 Paris	400 m
All-Africa Games
Silver medal – second place	2011 Maputo	400 m
African Championships
Gold medal – first place	2004 Brazzaville	4×400 m
Gold medal – first place	2006 Bambous	400 m
Silver medal – second place	1998 Dakar	4×400 m
Silver medal – second place	2010 Nairobi	400 m
Bronze medal – third place	2010 Nairobi	4×400 m
Bronze medal – third place	2012 Porto-Novo	400 m
Bronze medal – third place	2012 Porto-Novo	4×400 m

Amy Mbacké Thiam (born November 10, 1976) is a Senegalese athlete competing in the 400 metres.

== Biography ==
She has won medals in two World Championships, but at the 2004 Olympics she was knocked out in the heats. She is best known for winning the gold medal at the 2001 World Championships in Athletics held in Edmonton, Alberta, Canada. With her 49.86 in that victory, she still holds the Senegal national record.

== Competition record ==
Year	Competition	Venue	Position	Event	Notes
Representing Senegal
1997	Jeux de la Francophonie	Antananarivo, Madagascar	4th	400 m	53.25
1998	African Championships	Dakar, Senegal	4th	400 m	52.39
1999	World Championships	Seville, Spain	13th (sf)	400 m	50.77
1999	World Championships	Seville, Spain	10th (h)	4 × 400 m relay	3:30.99 (NR)
1999	All-Africa Games	Johannesburg, South Africa	3rd	400 m	50.95
1999	All-Africa Games	Johannesburg, South Africa	2nd	4 × 400 m relay	3:31.63
2000	Olympic Games	Sydney, Australia	12th (sf)	400 m	51.60
2000	Olympic Games	Sydney, Australia	13th (h)	4 × 400 m relay	3:28.02 (NR)
2001	Jeux de la Francophonie	Ottawa, Canada	1st	400 m	50.92
2001	World Championships	Edmonton, Canada	1st	400 m	49.86
2001	World Championships	Edmonton, Canada	11th (h)	4 × 400 m relay	3:30.03
2001	Goodwill Games	Brisbane, Australia	3rd	400 m	51.25
2002	African Championships	Radès, Tunisia	7th (h)	400 m	54.02
2003	World Championships	Paris, France	3rd	400 m	49.95
2003	World Championships	Paris, France	7th (h)	4 × 400 m relay	3:28.37
2004	African Championships	Brazzaville, Republic of the Congo	1st	4 × 400 m relay	3:29.41
2004	Olympic Games	Athens, Greece	29th (h)	400 m	52.44
2005	World Championships	Helsinki, Finland	8th	400 m	52.22
2005	World Championships	Helsinki, Finland	15th (h)	4 × 400 m relay	3:29.03
2006	African Championships	Bambous, Mauritius	1st	400 m	52.22
2007	World Championships	Osaka, Japan	38th (h)	400 m	54.31
2009	World Championships	Berlin, Germany	14th (sf)	400 m	51.70
2010	African Championships	Nairobi, Kenya	2nd	400 m	51.32
2010	African Championships	Nairobi, Kenya	3rd	4 × 400 m relay	3:35.55
2011	All-Africa Games	Maputo, Mozambique	2nd	400 m	51.77
2012	African Championships	Porto-Novo, Benin	3rd	400 m	51.68
2012	African Championships	Porto-Novo, Benin	3rd	4 × 400 m relay	3:31.64
2012	Olympic Games	London, United Kingdom	31st (h)	400 m	53.23
2013	World Championships	Moscow, Russia	20th (sf)	400 m	52.37

== See also ==
- Senegal at the 2004 Summer Olympics
