= Globine Mayova =

Namibian sprinter

Globine Mayova (born 29 February 1988) is a Namibian sprinter.

She was born in Grootfontein and chiefly participated in middle-distance races while attending school. She relocated to Windhoek in 2006. Being coached by Letu Hamhola in Welwitchia Athletics Club, Mayova took up the 200 and 400 metres. She participated in the 200 metres at the 2006 World Junior Championships without reaching the final.

On the continental level, Mayova reached the finals of the 200 metres at the 2011 All-Africa Games (but failed to finish that race) and at the 2012 African Championships, where she finished seventh.

In the 100 metres event, she competed at the 2011 All-Africa Games, the 2012 African Championships, the 2015 African Games and the 2019 African Games without reaching the final.

Starting in 2012, Mayova became a contender for Namibian records. She ran the 200 metres in 23.39 seconds in 2012 and improved to 23.34 seconds in 2013, but was still 0.04 seconds shy of qualifying for global-level competitions. The exception came at the 2012 World Indoor Championships, where she competed in the 60 metres and set a Namibian indoor record of 7.64 seconds. This has later been beaten. However, Mayova was a part of the team that competed in the 4 × 400 metres relay at the 2015 IAAF World Relays and set a Namibian record. She also finished fourth with the Namibian team in 4 × 100 metres relay at the 2019 African Games.

After retirement, Mayova started working as a police officer in Windhoek, being transferred to Wanaheda in 2018.
