= Debbie Dunn =

American sprinter (born 1978)

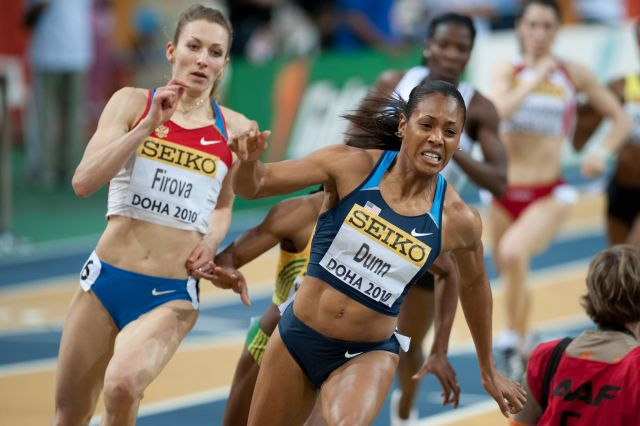
- Dunn on her way to victory during the 2010 World Indoor Championships

Personal information
- Born: 26 March 1978 (age 48)
Medal record
Women's athletics (track and field)
Representing the United States
World Championships
Gold medal – first place	2009 Berlin	4 × 400 m relay
World Indoor Championships
Gold medal – first place	2010 Doha	400 m
Gold medal – first place	2010 Doha	4 × 400 m relay
Silver medal – second place	2006 Moscow	4 × 400 m relay
Pan American Games
Bronze medal – third place	2007 Rio de Janeiro	4 × 400 m relay
Continental Cup
Silver medal – second place	2010 Split	400 m

Debbie Dunn (born 26 March 1978) is an American sprinter, who specializes in the 400 metres. Originally from Jamaica, she attended Fairmont Heights High School in Maryland, then Norfolk State University, and became an American citizen in 2004.

At the 2009 World Championships in Athletics Dunn set a personal best of 49.95 seconds to qualify for the 400 metres world final. She was a little slower in the final, however, and finished in sixth place. In the 4 × 400 m relay event she finally outpaced everybody, grabbing the gold medal together with teammates Allyson Felix, Lashinda Demus and Sanya Richards.

One year later, at the 2010 World Indoor Championships in Doha, Dunn achieved her first major individual victory by becoming 400 metres world indoor champion. She earned a second gold medal for the 4 × 400 m relay, in which the U.S. team consisting of Dunn, DeeDee Trotter, Natasha Hastings and Allyson Felix finished in 3:27.34.

In July 2012, it was announced that she tested positive for a banned substance. In September 2012 she was given a two-year suspension.

== Personal bests ==
- 200 metres – 22.73 s (2009)
- 400 metres – 49.64 s (2010)
