= Tigst Assefa =

Ethiopian long-distance runner (born 1996)

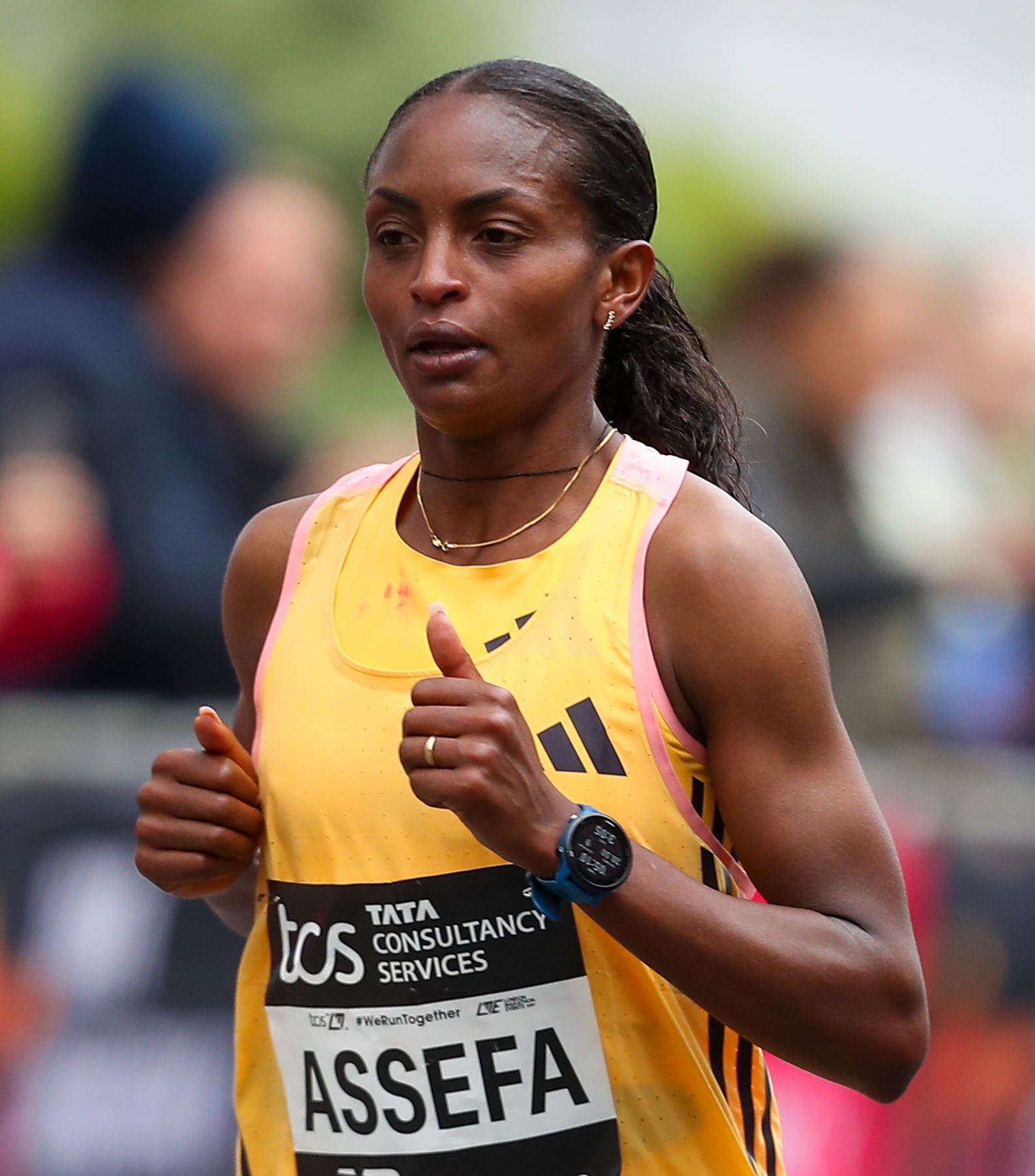
- Tigst at the 2024 London Marathon

Personal information
- Full name: Tigst Assefa Tessema
- Born: 3 December 1996 (age 29) Holeta, Oromia, Ethiopia
- Height: 167 cm (5 ft 6 in)
- Spouse: Eyob Elias

Sport
- Country: Ethiopia
- Sport: Athletics
- Event: Long-distance running
- Coached by: Gemedu Dedefo

Achievements and titles
- Highest world ranking: 1st (Marathon, 2023)
- Personal bests: 800 m: 1:59.24 (Lausanne 2014); Marathon: 2:11:04 (Berlin 2026)
Medal record
Women's athletics
Representing Ethiopia
Olympic Games
Silver medal – second place	2024 Paris	Marathon
World Championships
Silver medal – second place	2025 Tokyo	Marathon
World Marathon Majors
Gold medal – first place	2022 Berlin	Marathon
Gold medal – first place	2023 Berlin	Marathon
Gold medal – first place	2026 Berlin	Marathon
Gold medal – first place	2025 London	Marathon
Gold medal – first place	2026 London	Marathon
Silver medal – second place	2024 London	Marathon
African Junior Championships
Silver medal – second place	2013 Bambous	4x400 m relay
Bronze medal – third place	2013 Bambous	800 m

Tigst Assefa Tessema (Amharic: ትእግስት አሰፋ; Oromo: Tigist Asaffaa Tasammaa; born 3 December 1996) is an Ethiopian long-distance runner and the current world record holder in the women's marathon (women only race). She has won 5 World Marathon Majors, thrice in Berlin and twice in London. A former 800 metres specialist, Tigst switched to road races in 2018 and ran her first marathon in 2022.

At the age of 16, she won the bronze medal in the 800 metres at the 2013 African Junior Championships. She finished fourth at the senior African Championships the following year, and then represented Ethiopia in the event at the 2016 Rio Olympics aged 19. Tigst ran the then third-fastest female marathon in history at the 2022 Berlin Marathon and defeated the world record by 2 minutes and 11 seconds at the 2023 Berlin Marathon, on 24 September, with a time of 2 hours 11 minutes and 53 seconds, becoming the first woman to break the 2:14, 2:13, and 2:12 barriers in a marathon. Tigst subsequently set the world record for a women's-only marathon at the 2025 London Marathon, a record she went on to break herself one year later.

== Career ==
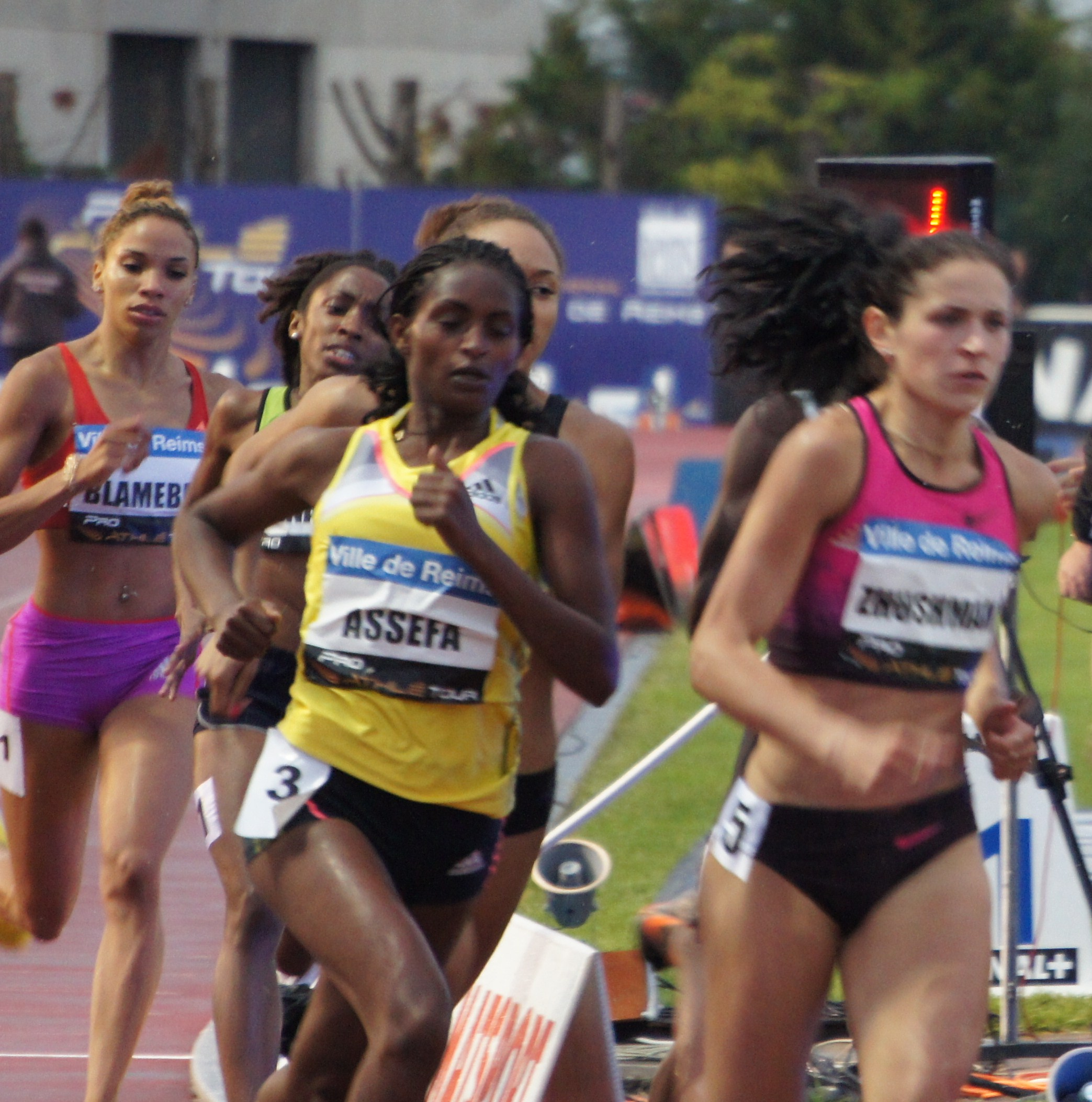
Tigst (in yellow shirt) at a meet in Reims, France in 2013

At the age of 12, Tigst won the bronze medal in the 400 metres at the 2009 senior Ethiopian Athletics Championships, stopping the clock at 56.70 seconds. She gained her first international experience in January 2012, in France, where she competed for the first time in the 800 metres, although failing to finish. The 15-year-old represented Ethiopia in the 400 m at the senior African Championships in Athletics in Porto-Novo, Benin, setting a new personal best in the heats with a time of 54.05 s.

In 2013, aged 16, Tigst became Ethiopian junior champion, clocking 2:01.25 in Bellinzona, Switzerland, and earned bronze at the African Junior Championships held in Réduit, Mauritius, where she also added silver for the 4 × 400 m relay. The following year, she ran 1:59.24 at the Lausanne Diamond League, finished fourth at the African Championships in Marrakesh, won the ISTAF Berlin meet, and placed fourth at the IAAF Continental Cup in Marrakesh.

In 2016, Tigst represented Ethiopia in the 800 metres at the World Indoor Championships held in Portland, United States and at the Rio Olympic Games in Brazil. She failed to advance past preliminary rounds both in the first and second event.

After 2016, Tigst moved to road racing as an ongoing Achilles tendon injury prevented her from training in spikes. After a two-year break, in November 2018, she raced the 10 km in Dubai for a time of 34:35. Tigst improved by almost three minutes (31:45) in Germany the following year, when she debuted in the half marathon at the Valencia Half Marathon in Spain, finishing fifth in 68:24.

=== 2022: #3 female marathon all time ===
In March, after a two-year hiatus due to a career-threatening injury sustained in 2019 in Valencia and also the COVID-19 pandemic, Tigst debuted in the marathon distance at the inaugural Riyadh Marathon, finishing seventh with a time of 2:34:01. She competed in five additional races from March through June, competing in three 10 km events and two half marathons, winning all of them and setting new personal bests (30:52 in Langueux, France and 67:28 at the adizero Road to Records event in Herzogenaurach, Germany, respectively.

Tigst set the third-fastest female performance in history at the Berlin Marathon in September. She stopped the clock at two hours 15 minutes 37 seconds, her winning time slower only than 2:14:04 of world record-holder Brigid Kosgei and 2:15:25 of former record-holder Paula Radcliffe, an over 18 minutes improvement of her personal best. Running with a negative split, after the 68:13 first half of the race, her second half of 67:24 was faster by 4 s than her then half marathon lifetime best. In December, she won the Bahrain Royal Night Half Marathon in Manama.

=== 2023: World marathon record – first woman under 2:14, 2:13 and 2:12 ===
External media
- WR at the 2023 Berlin Marathon

Images
- With a lead car's clock

Video
- Crossing the finish line

On 24 September, wearing super shoes, Tigst competed at the 2023 Berlin Marathon and set a new female world record with a time of 2:11:53, chopping two minutes and eleven seconds from Brigid Kosgei's record of 2:14:04 from the 2019 Chicago Marathon. Tigst became the first woman to break the 2:14, 2:13 and 2:12 barriers in a marathon. She completed the first half of the race almost two minutes faster than the previous year with a time of 66:20 and the second half in 65:33. Tigst beat the runner-up by almost six minutes, with the assistance of pacemaker Girmay Birhanu Gebru for almost the entire race.

This was the first time that an Ethiopian woman broke the marathon world record. Tigst's time was faster than the old men's world best mark of her compatriot Abebe Bikila, who in 1960. Her time would have been the men's world record until December 1967. She received an World Athlete of the Year award in the Out of Stadium category.

Tigst's record was later initially broken by Ruth Chepng'etich, who ran 2:09:56 at the 2024 Chicago Marathon; however, while Chepng'etich was banned for doping in 2025, her record remains.

=== 2024: Olympic games 2024 – silver medal on the marathon ===
On August 11, 2024, Tigst finished second in the Olympic marathon with a time of 2:22:58, three seconds behind winner Sifan Hassan. In the final sprint, Tigst drifted towards the barriers, resulting in a collision with Hassan and causing both athletes to stumble. Hassan then passed Tigst and won the race by the narrowest margin in the history of women's olympic marathons. Afterwards, the Ethiopian team filed a protest to disqualify Hassan due to obstruction, which was rejected by the Jury of Appeal. At the post-race news conference, Tigst stated through a translator "I didn't expect at that moment it would happen. Maybe at that moment, if she didn't push me I would have the gold."

=== 2025: London Marathon – gold medal and breaking women's-only world record ===
On 27 April 2025, Tigst won the 45th London Marathon and set a world record for a women-only marathon.

=== 2026: Berlin Marathon ===
On 27 September 2026 Assefa finished the 2026 Berlin Marathon in 2:11:04. Despite suffering an Achilles tendon rupture on the last kilometers and limping across the finish line, she won the race.

== Achievements ==
Information from World Athletics profile.

=== Personal bests ===
Type	Event	Time	Date	Place	Notes
Track	400 metres	54.05	27 June 2012	Porto-Novo, Benin	
Track	800 metres	1:59.24	3 July 2014	Lausanne, Switzerland	
Road	10 km	30:52	25 June 2022	Langueux, France	
Road	Half marathon	1:07:28	30 April 2022	Herzogenaurach, Germany	
Road	Marathon	2:11:04	27 September 2026	Berlin, Germany	3rd all-time

=== International competitions ===
Representing Ethiopia
Year	Competition	Venue	Position	Event	Time
2012	African Championships	Porto-Novo, Benin	19th (sf)	400 m	55.58 (Note: In the heats Tigst ran a time of 54.05 seconds.)
2012	African Championships	Porto-Novo, Benin	7th	4 × 400 m relay	3:41.10
2013	African Junior Championships	Réduit, Mauritius	3rd	800 m	2:05.6h
2013	African Junior Championships	Réduit, Mauritius	2nd	4 × 400 m relay	3:42.2h
2014	African Championships	Marrakesh, Morocco	4th	800 m	2:00.43
2014	Continental Cup	Marrakesh, Morocco	4th	800 m	2:00.57
2016	World Indoor Championships	Portland, United States	12th (h)	800 m i	2:04.55
2016	Olympic Games	Rio de Janeiro, Brazil	20th (h)	800 m	2:00.21 SB
2025	World Championships	Tokyo, Japan	2nd	Marathon	2:24:45
World Marathon Majors
2022	Berlin Marathon	Berlin, Germany	1st	Marathon	2:15:37 CR NR
2023	Berlin Marathon	Berlin, Germany	1st	Marathon	2:11:53 CR WR
2024	London Marathon	London, England	2nd	Marathon	2:16:23
2025	London Marathon	London, England	1st	Marathon	2:15:50
2026	London Marathon	London, England	1st	Marathon	2:15:41
2026	Berlin Marathon	Berlin, Germany	1st	Marathon	2:11:04 CR PB

== Notes ==
Records
Preceded by (Kenya) Brigid Kosgei	Women's marathon world record holder 24 September 2023 – present	Current holder
