= Tjipekapora Herunga =

Namibian sprinter (born 1988)

Personal information
- Born: 1 January 1988 (age 38) Ehangono, South-West Africa
- Height: 1.67 m (5 ft 5 1/2 in)
- Weight: 51 kg (112 lb)

Sport
- Sport: Athletics
- Event: 400 metres
- Club: Welwitschia 77 Athletics Club
Medal record
Representing Namibia
All-Africa Games
Bronze medal – third place	2011 Maputo	200 m
Bronze medal – third place	2011 Maputo	400 m
Bronze medal – third place	2015 Brazzaville	400 m

Tjipekapora Herunga (born 1 January 1988 in Ehangono) is a Namibian sprinter who specialises in the 400 metres. She represented her country at the 2012 Summer Olympics as well as two outdoor and two indoor World Championships.

She is her country's national record holder in the 400 metres both outdoors and indoors. She broke the record while representing Namibia at the 2007 All-Africa Games.

== Competition record ==
Year	Competition	Venue	Position	Event	Notes
Representing Namibia
2005	World Youth Championships	Marrakesh, Morocco	35th (h)	800 m	2:19.93
2007	All-Africa Games	Algiers, Algeria	7th	400 m	53.13
2008	African Championships	Addis Ababa, Ethiopia	11th (sf)	400 m	54.00
2010	World Indoor Championships	Doha, Qatar	19th (h)	400 m	55.40
2010	African Championships	Nairobi, Kenya	22nd (h)	400 m	57.03
2011	World Championships	Daegu, South Korea	29th (h)	400 m	54.08
2011	All-Africa Games	Maputo, Mozambique	3rd	200 m	23.50
2011	All-Africa Games	Maputo, Mozambique	3rd	400 m	51.84
2012	African Championships	Porto-Novo, Benin	6th	200 m	23.92
2012	African Championships	Porto-Novo, Benin	–	400 m	DQ
2012	Olympic Games	London, United Kingdom	20th (sf)	400 m	52.53
2013	World Championships	Moscow, Russia	19th (h)	400 m	52.28
2015	IAAF World Relays	Nassau, Bahamas	16th (h)	4 × 400 m relay	3:41.47
2015	African Games	Brazzaville, Republic of the Congo	10th (h)	200 m	23.81
2015	African Games	Brazzaville, Republic of the Congo	3rd	400 m	51.55
2016	World Indoor Championships	Portland, United States	–	400 m	DQ
2018	African Championships	Asaba, Nigeria	21st (h)	400 m	55.90
2019	African Games	Rabat, Morocco	19th (sf)	200 m	24.49
2019	African Games	Rabat, Morocco	9th (sf)	400 m	53.49
2019	African Games	Rabat, Morocco	4th	4 × 100 m relay	45.55

== Personal bests ==
Outdoor

- 200 metres – 23.40 (+0.4 m/s, Pretoria 2012)
- 400 metres – 51.24 (Pretoria 2012) NR
- 800 metres – 2:16.52 (Windhoek 2005)

Indoor

- 400 metres – 55.40 (Doha 2010) NR
