= Tsholofelo Thipe =

South African sprinter (born 1986)

Personal information
- Full name: Tsholofelo Selemela-Thipe
- Nationality: South Africa
- Born: 9 December 1986 (age 39) Rustenburg, North West; Province, South Africa
- Height: 1.50 m (4 ft 11 in)
- Weight: 51 kg (112 lb)

Sport
- Sport: Athletics
- Event: Sprint
- Club: Royal Bafokeng Athletics
- Coached by: Eugene Thipe

Achievements and titles
- Personal best: 400 m: 51.15 s (2009)
Medal record
Women's athletics
Representing South Africa
African Championships
Bronze medal – third place	2008 Addis Ababa	4×100 m

Tsholofelo Thipe (née Selemela) (born 9 December 1986) is a South African sprinter, who specialized in the 400 metres. She set a personal best time of 51.15 seconds by winning the 400 metres event at the 2009 South African Championships in Stellenbosch. She was born in Rustenburg, North West Province.

== Career and training ==
Thipe was one of the first black women to represent South Africa on the track when she competed in the 400 metres at the 2008 Summer Olympics in Beijing. She ran in the sixth heat against seven other athletes, including Jamaica's Novlene Williams and Great Britain's Nicola Sanders, both of whom were heavy favorites in this event. She finished the race in sixth place, seventy-three hundredths (0.73) of a second ahead of Albania's Klodiana Shala, with a time of 54.11 seconds. Thipe failed to advance into the semi-finals, as she placed forty-third overall, and finished below the three automatic-advancement slots for the next round.

Thipe also sought to qualify for her second Olympics in London. She finished fifth in the final of the 400 metres at the 2012 African Athletics Championships in Porto-Novo, Benin; however, her time of 52.26 seconds was insufficient to secure her place at the Olympics. On October 16, 2012, Thipe was among the ten South African athletes who had failed the drug test for banned substances, including norandrosterone, from the African Championships. She blamed the national team's doctor for prescribing her a contraceptive pill called Norlevo, which contains the banned substance, and slammed Athletics South Africa (ASA) for their failure to follow correct procedure by disclosing the results of her doping test to the media before convening a hearing in which she could defend herself.

Thipe is also a resident athlete of Royal Bafokeng Athletics Club in Rustenburg. She is trained by her husband, Eugene Thipe, who also coaches sprinter and national record holder Simon Magakwe, a three-time finalist at the African Athletics Championships.
