= Justine Bayigga =

Ugandan sprinter

Personal information
- Nationality: Uganda
- Born: 15 January 1979 (age 47) Kayunga, Uganda
- Height: 1.55 m (5 ft 1 in)
- Weight: 57 kg (126 lb)

Sport
- Sport: Athletics
- Event: 400 m

Achievements and titles
- Personal best: 400 m: 52.48

Justine Bayigga (born 15 January 1979 in Kayunga) is a Ugandan sprinter, who specialized in the 400 metres. Bayigga represented Uganda at the 2008 Summer Olympics in Beijing, where she competed in the women's 400 metres. She ran in the second heat, against six other athletes, including Italy's Libania Grenot, and future world-record holder Amantle Montsho of Botswana. She completed the sprint race in last place, with a time of 54.15 seconds, failing to advance into the semi-finals.
