= Endurance Abinuwa =

Nigerian sprinter

Personal information
- Nationality: Nigerian
- Born: 31 July 1987 (age 38) Sapele, Nigeria
- Height: 1.59 m (5 ft 3 in)
- Weight: 54 kg (119 lb)

Sport
- Sport: Athletics
- Event: 400 metres
- College team: UTEP
Medal record
Women's athletics
Representing Nigeria
African Championships
Gold medal – first place	2008 Addis Ababa	4×400 m
Gold medal – first place	2012 Porto-Novo	4×400 m

Endurance Abinuwa (born 31 July 1987) is a Nigerian sprinter. She competed in the 2012 Summer Olympics.

Abinuwa was an All-American sprinter for the UTEP Miners track and field team, finishing 4th in the 400 m at the 2011 NCAA Division I Indoor Track and Field Championships. Blessing Okagbare told the UTEP coaches about Abinuwa and encouraged them to recruit her.
