= Athletics at the 2011 All-Africa Games =

Athletics at the X All-Africa Games
- Dates: 11–17 September
- Host city: Maputo, Mozambique
- Venue: Estádio do Zimpeto
- Events: 46

The athletics competition at the 2011 All-Africa Games was held from 11 to 15 September 2011 at the Estádio do Zimpeto in Zimpeto, Maputo, Mozambique.

== Medal summary ==
=== Men ===
| Event | Gold | | Silver | | Bronze | |
|---|---|---|---|---|---|---|
| 100 m | Amr Seoud (EGY) | 10.20 | Ben Youssef Meité (CIV) | 10.28 | Obinna Metu (NGA) | 10.29 |
| 200 m | Idrissa Adam (CMR) | 20.66 | Ben Youssef Meité (CIV) | 20.76 | Obakeng Ngwigwa (BOT) | 20.94 |
| 400 m | Rabah Yousif (SUD) | 45.27 | Tobi Ogunmola (NGR) | 45.82 | Mark Mutai (KEN) | 46.52 |
| 800 m | Taoufik Makhloufi (ALG) | 1:46:32 | Boaz Lalang (KEN) | 1:46:40 | Job Kinyor (KEN) | 1:46:52 |
| 1500 m | Caleb Ndiku (KEN) | 3:39.12 | Collins Cheboi (KEN) | 3:39.72 | Taoufik Makhloufi (ALG) | 3:39.99 |
| 5000 m | Moses Kipsiro (UGA) | 13:43.08 | Yenew Alamirew (ETH) | 13:43.33 | Abayneh Ayele (ETH) | 13:43.51 |
| 10,000 m | Ibrahim Jeilan (ETH) | 28:18.22 | Bedan Karuki Muchiri (KEN) | 28:19.22 | Azmeraw Bekele (ETH) | 28:19.32 |
| 110 m hurdles | Othmane Hadj Lazib (ALG) | 13.48 GR | Selim Nurudeen (NGA) | 13.61 | Samuel Okon (NGA) | 13.75 |
| 400 m hurdles | Abderrahmane Hammadi (ALG) | 50:48 | Kurt Couto (MOZ) | 51.04 | Julius Rotich (KEN) | 51.15 |
| 3000 m steeplechase | Birhan Getahun (ETH) | 8:17.40 | Roba Gari Chubeta (ETH) | 8:18.40 | Sisay Koreme Mojo (ETH) | 8:20.70 |
| 4 × 100 m relay | Nigeria; Peter Emelieze; Obinna Metu; Benjamin Adukwu; Ogho-Oghene Egwero | 38.93 | Ghana; Abdul Aziz Zakari; Emmanuel Appiah Kubi; Ashhad Agyapong; Tim Abeyie | 38.95 | Botswana; Pako Seribe; Fanuel Kenosi; Thapelo Ketlogetswe; Obakeng Ngwigwa | 39.09 |
| 4 × 400 m relay | Kenya; Anderson Mureta Mutegi; Jonathan Kibet; Vincent Mumo; Mark Mutai | 3:03.10 | Nigeria ? ? ? James Godday | 3:05.26 | Botswana; Zacharia Kamberuka; Obakeng Ngwigwa; Tsepho Kelaotse; Isaac Makwala | 3:05.92 |
| 20 km walk | Hassanine Sebei (TUN) | 1:24:53 | Hedi Teraoui (TUN) | 1:26:44 | Gabriel Ngintedem (CMR) | 1:32:08 |
| Half marathon | Lelisa Desisa (ETH) | 1:04:31 | Kennet Kipkemoi (KEN) | 1:04:44 | Bekana Daba (ETH) | 1:04:51 |
| High jump | Ali Mohd Younes Idriss (SUD) | 2.25 | Kabelo Kgosiemang (BOT) | 2.20 | William Woodcock (SEY) | 2.15 |
| Pole vault | Larbi Bouraada (ALG) | 5.00 | Mourad Souissi (ALG) | 4.00 | Only two athletes competed | |
| Long jump | Luvo Manyonga (RSA) | 8.02 -0.1 | Ignisious Gaisah (GHA) | 7.86; 0.2 | Ndiss Kaba Badji (SEN) | 7.83 -0.6 |
| Triple jump | Tosin Oke (NGR) | 16.65 | Issam Nima (ALG) | 16.54 | Hugo Mamba-Schlick (CMR) | 16.17 |
| Shot put | Yasser Ibrahim Farag (EGY) | 19.73 GR | Jaco Engelbrecht (RSA) | 18.89 | Roelie Potgieter (RSA) | 18.68 |
| Discus throw | Yasser Ibrahim Farag (EGY) | 63.20 | Victor Hogan (RSA) | 62.60 | Russel Tucker (RSA) | 55.98 |
| Hammer throw | Mostafa Al-Gamel (EGY) | 74.76 | Chris Harmse (RSA) | 74.66 | Hassan Mohamed Mahmoud (EGY) | 69.70 |
| Javelin throw | Julius Yego (KEN) | 78.34 NR | Bernard Crous (RSA) | 72.68 | Friday Osanyade (NGR) | 71.01 |
| Decathlon | Jangy Addy (LBR) | 7985 pts GR | Guillaume Thierry (MRI) | 7481 pts NR | Ali Kamé (MAD) | 7458 pts |

=== Women ===
| Event | Gold | | Silver | | Bronze | |
|---|---|---|---|---|---|---|
| 100 m | Oludamola Osayomi (NGA) | 10.90w | Blessing Okagbare (NGA) | 11.01w SB | Gloria Asumnu (NGA) | 11.26w |
| 200 m | Oludamola Osayomi (NGA) | 22.86 | Vida Anim (GHA) | 23.06 | Tjipekapora Herunga (NAM) | 23.50 |
| 400 m | Amantle Montsho (BOT) | 50.87 | Amy Mbacké Thiam (SEN) | 51.77 | Tjipekapora Herunga (NAM) | 51.84 |
| 800 m | Annet Negesa (UGA) | 2:01.81 | Fantu Magiso (ETH) | 2:03.22 | Sylvia Chesebe (KEN) | 2:04.16 |
| 1500 m | Irene Jelagat (KEN) | 4:13.67 | Joyce Chepkirui (KEN) | 4:13.71 | Tezita Bogale (ETH) | 4:14.41 |
| 5000 m | Sule Utura (ETH) | 15:38.70 | Emebet Anteneh Mengistu (ETH) | 15:40.13 | Pauline Korikwiang (KEN) | 15:40.93 |
| 10,000 m | Sule Utura (ETH) | 33:24.82 | Wude Ayalew (ETH) | 33:24.88 | Pauline Korikwiang (KEN) | 33:26.17 |
| 100 m hurdles | Seun Adigun (NGR) | 13.20 | Jessica Ohanaja (NGR) | 13.36 | Rosa Rakotozafy (MAD) | 13.55 |
| 400 m hurdles | Ajoke Odumosu (NGR) | 56.26 | Wenda Theron (RSA) | 57.13 | Kou Luogon (LBR) | 57.34 |
| 3000 m steeplechase | Hyvin Kiyeng Jepkemoi (KEN) | 10:00.50 | Hiwot Ayalew (ETH) | 10:00.57 | Birtukan Adamu (ETH) | 10:02.22 |
| 4 × 100 m relay | Nigeria; Gloria Asumnu; Agnes Osazuwa; Oludamola Osayomi; Blessing Okagbare | 43.34 | Ghana | 44.33 | Cameroon | 45.00 |
| 4 × 400 m relay | Nigeria ? ? ? Bukola Abogunloko | 3:31.21 | Senegal ? ? ? Amy Mbacké Thiam | 3:32.21 | Kenya ? ? ? Sakari Joy Nakumicha | 3:37.37 |
| 20 km walk | Chaima Trabelsi (TUN) | 1:40.35 GR | Olfa Lafi (TUN) | 1:41.25 | Aynalem Eshitu (ETH) | 1:42:19 |
| Half marathon | Mare Dibaba (ETH) | 1:10:47 GR | Mamitu Daska (ETH) | 1:10:52 | Helalia Johannes (NAM) | 1:11:12 |
| High jump | Doreen Amata (NGR) | 1.80 | Osazuwa Uhunoma (NGR) | 1.80 | Lissa Labiche (SEY) | 1.80 |
| Pole vault | Dorra Mahfoudhi (TUN) | 3.60 | Alima Ouattara (CIV) | 3.20 | Only two athletes cleared a height | |
| Long jump | Blessing Okagbare (NGR) | 6.50 +2.3 | Sarah Ngo Ngoa (CMR) | 6.46 +3.3 | Roumeissa Belabiod (ALG) | 6.46 +1.7 |
| Triple jump | Baya Rahouli (ALG) | 14.08 | Kene Ndoye (SEN) | 13.69 | Otonye Iworima (NGR) | 13.53 |
| Shot put | Auriol Dongmo Mekemnang (CMR) | 16.03 | Veronica Abrahamse (RSA) | 15.70 | Sonia Smuts (RSA) | 15.29 |
| Discus throw | Kazai Suzanne Kragbé (CIV) | 56.56 | Elizna Naudé (RSA) | 53.63 | Alifatou Djibril (TOG) | 46.46 |
| Hammer throw | Ami Sene (SEN) | 61.48 | Sarra Ben Saad (TUN) | 59.65 | Rana Ahmed Ibrahim (EGY) | 58.57 |
| Javelin throw | Justine Robbeson (RSA) | 55.33 | Gerlize de Klerk (RSA) | 52.27 | Lindy Agricole (SEY) | 51.26 |
| Heptathlon | Margaret Simpson (GHA) | 6172 pts | Gabriella Kouassi (CIV) | 5714 pts | Selloane Tsoaeli (LES) | 5590 pts |

== Para-sport ==
=== Men ===
| Event | Gold | | Silver | | Bronze | |
|---|---|---|---|---|---|---|
| 100m T37 | Sofiane Hamdi (ALG) | 11.84 | Fathallah Mostafa (EGY) | 12.09 | Mohamed Charmi (TUN) | 12.83 |
| 100m T46 | Suwaibidu Galadima (NGR) | 10.81 | Frank Johnwill (NGR) | 11.03 | Jean-Luc Noumbo (CIV) | 11.16 |
| 200m T11 | Ananias Shikongo (NAM) | 23.63 | Dos Santos Octavio (ANG) | 23.69 | Olusegen Rotawo (NGR) | 25.77 |
| 200m T12 | Adesoji Ademeora (NGA) | 22.62 | Nzuzgi Mwendo Henry (KEN) | 23.03 | Martin Aloisius (NAM) | 23.31 |
| 200m T37 | Fanie van der Merwe (RSA) | 23.10 | Sofiane Hamdi (ALG) | 23.73 | Mostafa Fathallah (EGY) | 24.60 |
| 200m T46 | Suwaibidu Galadima (NGR) | 22.36 | Bashiru Yunusa (NGR) | 22.43 | Adeji Saïdi (NGR) | 22.44 |
| 400m T11 | Dos Santos Octavio (ANG) | 51.60 | Jose Armando Sayovo (ANG) | 52.38 | Ananias Shikongo (NAM) | 53.07 |
| 400m T12 | Nzuzgi Mwendo Henry (KEN) | 49.82 | Mahmoud Khaldi (TUN) | 50.01 | Adesoji Ademeora (NGA) | 50.66 |
| 400m T37 | Sofiane Hamdi (ALG) | 54.89 | Mohamed Charmi (TUN) | 55.85 | Madjid Djemai (ALG) | 56.81 |
| 400m T46 | Hermans Muvunyi (RWA) | 50.28 | Yunusa Bashiru (NGR) | 50.73 | Frederick Kimou Addoh (CIV) | 50.90 |
| 800m T37 | Mohamed Charmi (TUN) | 2:06.90 | Madjid Djemai (ALG) | 2:16.10 | Sum Johnatan (KEN) | 2:31.30 |
| 800m T46 | Tarbei Abraham (KEN) | 1:55.33 | Hermans Muvuniy (RWA) | 1:56.00 | Gebru Tesfalem (ETH) | 1:56.39 |
| 1500m T46 | Chesum Jonah (KEN) | 3:55.46 | Tarbei Abraham (KEN) | 3:56.53 | Fikre Wondiye (ETH) | 3:57.39 |
| 1500m T53/54 | Ahmed Aouadi (TUN) | 3:26.08 | Patrick Yaw Obeng (CMR) | 3:27.97 | Felix Acheanpong (GHA) | 3:34.12 |
| 5000m T46 | Tarbei Abraham (KEN) | 14:00.53 | Chesum Jonah (KEN) | 14:02.03 | David Emong (UGA) | 14:25.49 |
| Javelin Throw F57/58 | Raed Saleem (EGY) | 45.52 | Silver Ezikpe (NGR) | 44.10 | Mahmoud Al Atar (EGY) | 42.00 |
| Discus Throw F37/38 | | | | | | |
| Discus Throw F57/58 | Elkhair Metawea (EGY) | 52.46 | Mahmoud Al Atar (EGY) | 46.20 | Ezikeipe Silver (NGR) | 45.37 |
| Shot Put F37/38 | Ibrahim Abdelwarth (EGY) | 15.01 | Hamdi Warfeli (TUN) | 13.47 | Ezikeipe Timipreye (NGR) | 8.79 |
| Shot Put F57/58 | Michael Louwrens (RSA) | 13.23 | Redouane Ait Said (ALG) | 14.56 | Silver Ezeikpe (NGR) | 13.91 |

=== Women ===
| Event | Gold | | Silver | | Bronze | |
|---|---|---|---|---|---|---|
| 100m T11/12 | Adewale Deborah (NGR) | 12.35 | Gincaso Esperanca (ANG) | 12.94 | Mary Awaza (NGR) | 12.96 |
| 100m T13 | Christine Akullo (UGA) | 13.24 | Yvonne Nyaradzai (ZIM) | 13.40 | Lynda Hamri (ALG) | 13.42 |
| 200m T11/12 | Adewale Deborah (NGR) | 25.49 | Mary Awaza (NGR) | 26.82 | Maria Muchavo (MOZ) | 27.44 |
| 400m T11/12 | Adewale Deborah (NGR) | 57.09 | Chouayah Najah (TUN) | 60.97 | Mary Awaza (NGR) | 61.22 |
| 400m T54 | Adjara Mohamed (GHA) | 1:01.36 | Patricia N'Nanji (NGR) | 1:03.16 | Samira Berri (TUN) | 1:03.47 |
| 1500m T53/54 | Adjara Mohamed (GHA) | 4:07.19 | Samira Berri (TUN) | 4:17.51 | Anita Fordjour (GHA) | 4:27.06 |
| Discus Throw F32/33/34 | Yousra Benjemaa (TUN) | 22.69 | Wadjda Benoumssad (ALG) | 19.98 | Mounia Gasmi (ALG) | 9.80 |
| Shot Put F32/33/34 | | | | | | |
| Shot Put F40 | Raoua Tili (TUN) | 9.15 | Laurita Onye (NGA) | 7.01 | Fatiha Mahdi (ALG) | 6.19 |

== Medal tables ==
=== Elite competition ===
* Host nation (Mozambique)

| Rank | Nation | Gold | Silver | Bronze | Total |
|---|---|---|---|---|---|
| 1 | Nigeria (NGR) | 10 | 6 | 5 | 21 |
| 2 | Ethiopia (ETH) | 6 | 7 | 7 | 20 |
| 3 | Kenya (KEN) | 5 | 5 | 7 | 17 |
| 4 | Algeria (ALG) | 5 | 2 | 2 | 9 |
| 5 | Egypt (EGY) | 4 | 0 | 2 | 6 |
| 6 | Tunisia (TUN) | 3 | 3 | 0 | 6 |
| 7 | South Africa (RSA) | 2 | 8 | 3 | 13 |
| 8 | Cameroon (CMR) | 2 | 1 | 3 | 6 |
| 9 | Sudan (SUD) | 2 | 0 | 0 | 2 |
| 9 | Uganda (UGA) | 2 | 0 | 0 | 2 |
| 11 | Ghana (GHA) | 1 | 4 | 0 | 5 |
| 11 | Ivory Coast (CIV) | 1 | 4 | 0 | 5 |
| 13 | Senegal (SEN) | 1 | 3 | 1 | 5 |
| 14 | Botswana (BOT) | 1 | 1 | 3 | 5 |
| 15 | Liberia (LBR) | 1 | 0 | 1 | 2 |
| 16 | Mauritius (MRI) | 0 | 1 | 0 | 1 |
| 16 | Mozambique (MOZ)* | 0 | 1 | 0 | 1 |
| 18 | Namibia (NAM) | 0 | 0 | 3 | 3 |
| 18 | Seychelles (SEY) | 0 | 0 | 3 | 3 |
| 20 | Madagascar (MAD) | 0 | 0 | 2 | 2 |
| 21 | Lesotho (LES) | 0 | 0 | 1 | 1 |
| 21 | Togo (TOG) | 0 | 0 | 1 | 1 |
| Totals (22 entries) | | 46 | 46 | 44 | 136 |

=== Para-sport competition ===
* Host nation (Mozambique)

| Rank | Nation | Gold | Silver | Bronze | Total |
|---|---|---|---|---|---|
| 1 | Nigeria (NGR) | 6 | 7 | 8 | 21 |
| 2 | Tunisia (TUN) | 4 | 5 | 2 | 11 |
| 3 | Kenya (KEN) | 4 | 3 | 1 | 8 |
| 4 | Egypt (EGY) | 3 | 2 | 2 | 7 |
| 5 | Algeria (ALG) | 2 | 4 | 4 | 10 |
| 6 | Ghana (GHA) | 2 | 0 | 2 | 4 |
| 7 | South Africa (RSA) | 2 | 0 | 0 | 2 |
| 8 | Angola (ANG) | 1 | 3 | 0 | 4 |
| 9 | Rwanda (RWA) | 1 | 1 | 0 | 2 |
| 10 | Namibia (NAM) | 1 | 0 | 2 | 3 |
| 11 | Uganda (UGA) | 1 | 0 | 1 | 2 |
| 12 | Cameroon (CMR) | 0 | 1 | 0 | 1 |
| 12 | Zimbabwe (ZIM) | 0 | 1 | 0 | 1 |
| 14 | Ethiopia (ETH) | 0 | 0 | 2 | 2 |
| 14 | Ivory Coast (CIV) | 0 | 0 | 2 | 2 |
| 16 | Mozambique (MOZ)* | 0 | 0 | 1 | 1 |
| Totals (16 entries) | | 27 | 27 | 27 | 81 |

== Games statistics ==
At the competition Jangy Addy (Liberia) won the first ever International athletic event gold medal for his country.
