= Ndèye Fatou Soumah =

Senegalese sprinter (born 1986)

Medal record

Women's athletics

Representing Senegal

African Championships
Bronze medal – third place	2010 Nairobi	4×400 m
Bronze medal – third place	2012 Porto-Novo	4×400 m

Ndèye Fatou Seck Soumah Sow (born 6 April 1986 in Saint-Louis, Senegal) is a Senegalese female sprinter. At the 2012 Summer Olympics, she competed in the Women's 200 metres but was eliminated in the first round.
