= Racheal Nachula =

Zambian sprinter and footballer (born 1986)

Personal information
- Date of birth: 14 January 1986 (age 40)
- Place of birth: Lusaka, Zambia
- Height: 1.69 m (5 ft 7 in)
- Position: Forward

Senior career*
Years	Team	Apps	(Gls)
–2020	Green Buffaloes		
2020–2023	Zaragoza CFF	42	(12)
2023–2025	Hapoel Katamon Jerusalem		

International career
- Zambia
Medal record
Women's athletics
Representing Zambia
African Championships
Bronze medal – third place	2008 Addis Ababa	400 m
- * Club domestic league appearances and goals

Racheal Nachula (born 14 January 1986) is a Zambian women's professional footballer and former sprinter who plays as a forward for the Zambia women's national team.

== Athletics ==
Specialized in the 400 metres, Nachula won the bronze medal at the 2008 African Championships, in a personal best time of 51.39 seconds. She competed at the 2006 Commonwealth Games, the 2006 World Junior Championships, the 2008 World Indoor Championships, and the 2008 Summer Olympics without qualifying for the final round. She won the silver medal in the 400 m at the 2009 African Junior Athletics Championships, recording a time of 53.34 seconds.

She also has 23.42 seconds in the 200 metres, achieved in May 2007 in Gaborone.

== Football ==
=== International career ===
On 3 July 2024, Nachula was called up to the Zambia squad for the 2024 Summer Olympics.

=== International goals ===
Scores and results list Zambia's goal tally first.

No.	Date	Venue	Opponent	Score	Result	Competition
1.	13 September 2017	Barbourfields Stadium, Bulawayo, Zimbabwe	Malawi	6–3	6–3	2017 COSAFA Women's Championship
2.	17 September 2017	Barbourfields Stadium, Bulawayo, Zimbabwe	Madagascar	7–1	7–1	2017 COSAFA Women's Championship
3.	18 September 2018	Wolfson Stadium, KwaZakele, South Africa	Mozambique	1–0	3–0	2018 COSAFA Women's Championship
4.	1 August 2019	Wolfson Stadium, KwaZakele, South Africa	Mauritius	1–0	15–0	2019 COSAFA Women's Championship
5.	1 August 2019	Wolfson Stadium, KwaZakele, South Africa	Mauritius	3–0	15–0	2019 COSAFA Women's Championship
6.	1 August 2019	Wolfson Stadium, KwaZakele, South Africa	Mauritius	5–0	15–0	2019 COSAFA Women's Championship
7.	1 August 2019	Wolfson Stadium, KwaZakele, South Africa	Mauritius	8–0	15–0	2019 COSAFA Women's Championship
8.	1 August 2019	Wolfson Stadium, KwaZakele, South Africa	Mauritius	9–0	15–0	2019 COSAFA Women's Championship
9.	1 August 2019	Wolfson Stadium, KwaZakele, South Africa	Mauritius	10–0	15–0	2019 COSAFA Women's Championship
10.	1 August 2019	Wolfson Stadium, KwaZakele, South Africa	Mauritius	12–0	15–0	2019 COSAFA Women's Championship
11.	1 August 2019	Wolfson Stadium, KwaZakele, South Africa	Mauritius	15–0	15–0	2019 COSAFA Women's Championship
12.	8 August 2019	Wolfson Stadium, KwaZakele, South Africa	Botswana	1–0	4–0	2019 COSAFA Women's Championship
13.	8 August 2019	Wolfson Stadium, KwaZakele, South Africa	Botswana	4–0	4–0	2019 COSAFA Women's Championship
14.	28 November 2020	Estadio San Carlos de Apoquindo, Santiago, Chile	Chile	2–1	2–1	Friendly
15.	21 February 2023	Miracle Sports Complex, Alanya, Turkey	Uzbekistan	2–0	4–0	2023 Turkish Women's Cup
16.	25 February 2025	REIZ Stadium, Lusaka, Zambia	Malawi	2–3	2–3	Friendly
17.	5 April 2025	Yongchuan Sports Center, Chongqing, China	Thailand	1–1	2–3	2025 Yongchuan International Tournament
18.	22 October 2025	Dobsonville Stadium, Johannesburg, Zambia	Namibia	2–0	4–2	2026 Women's Africa Cup of Nations qualification
19.	28 July 2026	Rabat Olympic Stadium, Casablanca, Morocco	Egypt	1–0	6–0	2026 Women's Africa Cup of Nations
