= Athletics at the 1999 All-Africa Games – Men's 100 metres =

Athletics at the 1999 All-Africa Games
Track events
100 m	men	women
200 m	men	women
400 m	men	women
800 m	men	women
1500 m	men	women
5000 m	men	women
10,000 m	men	women
100 m hurdles		women
110 m hurdles	men
400 m hurdles	men	women
3000 m steeplechase	men
4×100 m relay	men	women
4×400 m relay	men	women
Road events
Marathon	men	women
10 km walk		women
20 km walk	men
Field events
High jump	men	women
Pole vault	men	women
Long jump	men	women
Triple jump	men	women
Shot put	men	women
Discus throw	men	women
Hammer throw	men	women
Javelin throw	men	women
Combined events
Heptathlon		women
Decathlon	men

The men's 100 metres event at the 1999 All-Africa Games was held 14–15 September 1999 at the Johannesburg Stadium.

== Medalists ==
Gold	Silver	Bronze
Leonard Myles-Mills; Ghana	Francis Obikwelu; Nigeria	Frankie Fredericks; Namibia

== Results ==
=== Heats ===
Qualification: First 3 of each heat (Q) and the next 6 fastest (q) qualified for the semifinals.

Rank	Heat	Name	Nationality	Time	Notes
1	4	Deji Aliu	Nigeria	10.18	Q
2	6	Mathew Quinn	South Africa	10.22	Q
3	5	Innocent Asonze	Nigeria	10.27	Q
4	1	Frankie Fredericks	Namibia	10.32	Q
4	2	Serge Bengono	Cameroon	10.32	Q
4	3	Francis Obikwelu	Nigeria	10.32	Q
4	4	Ahmed Douhou	Ivory Coast	10.32	Q
8	2	Leonard Myles-Mills	Ghana	10.34	Q
9	2	Ibrahim Meité	Ivory Coast	10.34	Q
10	6	Benedictus Botha	Namibia	10.35	Q
11	6	Stéphane Buckland	Mauritius	10.37	Q
12	3	Benjamin Sirimou	Cameroon	10.38	Q
13	5	Sherwin Vries	Namibia	10.39	Q
14	3	Lee Roy Newton	South Africa	10.42	Q
15	2	Hadhari Djaffar	Comoros	10.46	q
16	3	Yves Sonan	Ivory Coast	10.47	q
17	1	Pascal Dangbo	Benin	10.51	Q
18	4	Bradley Agnew	South Africa	10.54	Q
19	4	Jean-Francis Ngapout	Cameroon	10.56	q
20	1	Nicholas Hogan	Mauritius	10.57	Q
21	4	Amarildo Almeida	Guinea-Bissau	10.59	q
22	1	Patrick Mocci-Raoumbé	Gabon	10.61	q
23	3	Themba Ncube	Zimbabwe	10.64	
23	6	Moumi Sébergué	Chad	10.64	q
25	2	Ezra Sambu	Kenya	10.65	
25	6	Souhalia Alamou	Benin	10.65	
27	2	Roger Angono	Republic of the Congo	10.66	
28	6	Idrissa Sanou	Burkina Faso	10.67	
29	5	Fernando Ariete	Guinea-Bissau	10.74	Q
30	3	Barnabé Jolicoeur	Mauritius	10.76	
31	5	Stanley Towett	Kenya	10.78	
32	1	Molise Rammita	Lesotho	10.81	
33	6	Florent Nedingam	Chad	10.91	
34	5	David Mbyembita	Gabon	10.92	
35	4	Yvan Doboze	Gabon	10.93	
36	2	Berhe Tesfagiorgis	Eritrea	11.55	
	5	Arcadius Fanou	Benin	DQ	
	1	Joseph Kojo	Uganda	DNS	
	1	Alpha Kamara	Liberia	DNS	
	3	Kouami Ayassou	Togo	DNS	
	4	Faissoil Ben	Comoros	DNS	
	5	Téko Folligan	Togo	DNS	
	5	Franus Keita	Sierra Leone	DNS	
	6	Thomas Sanda	Sierra Leone	DNS	

=== Semifinals ===
Qualification: First 2 of each semifinal (Q) and the next 2 fastest (q) qualified for the final.

Rank	Heat	Name	Nationality	Time	Notes
1	1	Deji Aliu	Nigeria	10.11	Q
2	3	Leonard Myles-Mills	Ghana	10.18	Q
3	2	Francis Obikwelu	Nigeria	10.21	Q
4	2	Mathew Quinn	South Africa	10.24	Q
5	2	Serge Bengono	Cameroon	10.25	q
5	3	Innocent Asonze	Nigeria	10.25	Q
7	1	Frankie Fredericks	Namibia	10.27	Q
8	2	Stéphane Buckland	Mauritius	10.34	q
9	3	Ibrahim Meité	Ivory Coast	10.36	
10	1	Ahmed Douhou	Ivory Coast	10.38	
10	2	Sherwin Vries	Namibia	10.38	
12	1	Benjamin Sirimou	Cameroon	10.41	
13	1	Hadhari Djaffar	Comoros	10.45	
14	1	Lee Roy Newton	South Africa	10.48	
15	2	Yves Sonan	Ivory Coast	10.56	
15	3	Benedictus Botha	Namibia	10.56	
17	2	Amarildo Almeida	Guinea-Bissau	10.59	
18	3	Pascal Dangbo	Benin	10.62	
19	3	Bradley Agnew	South Africa	10.65	
20	2	Patrick Mocci-Raoumbé	Gabon	10.66	
21	3	Nicholas Hogan	Mauritius	10.69	
22	3	Jean-Francis Ngapout	Cameroon	10.70	
23	1	Moumi Sébergué	Chad	10.71	
24	1	Fernando Ariete	Guinea-Bissau	10.85	

=== Final ===
Wind: 0.0 m/s

Rank	Name	Nationality	Time	Notes
1st place, gold medalist(s)	Leonard Myles-Mills	Ghana	9.99	GR
2nd place, silver medalist(s)	Francis Obikwelu	Nigeria	10.01	
3rd place, bronze medalist(s)	Frankie Fredericks	Namibia	10.10	
4	Deji Aliu	Nigeria	10.11	
5	Innocent Asonze	Nigeria	10.19	
6	Serge Bengono	Cameroon	10.28	
7	Mathew Quinn	South Africa	10.31	
8	Stéphane Buckland	Mauritius	11.17	
