= Athletics at the 1999 All-Africa Games – Men's 200 metres =

Athletics at the 1999 All-Africa Games
Track events
100 m	men	women
200 m	men	women
400 m	men	women
800 m	men	women
1500 m	men	women
5000 m	men	women
10,000 m	men	women
100 m hurdles		women
110 m hurdles	men
400 m hurdles	men	women
3000 m steeplechase	men
4×100 m relay	men	women
4×400 m relay	men	women
Road events
Marathon	men	women
10 km walk		women
20 km walk	men
Field events
High jump	men	women
Pole vault	men	women
Long jump	men	women
Triple jump	men	women
Shot put	men	women
Discus throw	men	women
Hammer throw	men	women
Javelin throw	men	women
Combined events
Heptathlon		women
Decathlon	men

The men's 200 metres event at the 1999 All-Africa Games was held on 17 and 18 September 1999 at the Johannesburg Stadium.

== Medalists ==
Gold	Silver	Bronze
Francis Obikwelu; Nigeria	Joseph Batangdon; Cameroon	Daniel Effiong; Nigeria

== Results ==
=== Heats ===
Qualification: First 3 of each heat (Q) and the next 4 fastest (q) qualified for the semifinals.

Rank	Heat	Name	Nationality	Time	Notes
1	1	Joseph Batangdon	Cameroon	20.31	Q, NR
2	4	Marcus la Grange	South Africa	20.61	Q
3	4	Christie van Wyk	Namibia	20.66	Q
4	2	Daniel Effiong	Nigeria	20.73	Q
5	2	Paul Gorries	South Africa	20.78	Q
6	3	Antoine Boussombo	Gabon	20.80	Q
7	3	Oumar Loum	Senegal	20.84	Q
8	4	Sunday Emmanuel	Nigeria	20.90	Q
9	3	Benjamin Sirimou	Cameroon	20.94	Q
10	3	Hadhari Djaffar	Comoros	21.06	q
11	4	Amarildo Almeida	Guinea-Bissau	21.18	q
12	1	Francis Obikwelu	Nigeria	21.19	Q
13	1	Morné Nagel	South Africa	21.23	Q
14	1	Ibrahim Meité	Ivory Coast	21.28	q
15	4	Mojalefa Mosili	Lesotho	21.35	q
17	4	Amin Badany Goma'a	Egypt	21.50	
18	2	Bakulu Yambo	Democratic Republic of the Congo	21.62	
19	3	Stanley Towett	Kenya	21.73	
20	2	Fernando Ariete	Guinea-Bissau	21.82	
21	1	Brahim Abdoulaye	Chad	21.89	
22	2	Charles Tayot	Gabon	21.94	
23	4	Issa Gougou	Chad	22.18	
24	1	Moses Kondowe	Malawi	22.21	
25	4	Uboranimgoga Stratom	Rwanda	22.22	
26	2	Berhe Tesfagiorgis	Eritrea	23.08	
	1	Pascal Dangbo	Benin	DNS	
	1	Bothwell Mawuswa	Zambia	DNS	
	1	Sherwin Vries	Namibia	DNS	
	2	Idrissa Sanou	Burkina Faso	DNS	
	2	Frankie Fredericks	Namibia	DNS	
	2	Souhalia Alamou	Benin	DNS	
	3	Molefi Mphou	Lesotho	DNS	
	3	Sylvin Galouon	Republic of the Congo	DNS	
	3	Kossi Akoto	Togo	DNS	

=== Semifinals ===
Qualification: First 4 of each semifinal (Q) qualified for the final.

Rank	Heat	Name	Nationality	Time	Notes
1	1	Francis Obikwelu	Nigeria	20.23	Q
2	1	Joseph Batangdon	Cameroon	20.33	Q
3	2	Daniel Effiong	Nigeria	20.44	Q
4	2	Marcus la Grange	South Africa	20.51	Q
5	1	Antoine Boussombo	Gabon	20.57	Q
6	1	Sunday Emmanuel	Nigeria	20.70	Q
7	2	Oumar Loum	Senegal	??.??	Q
8	2	Christie van Wyk	Namibia	20.75	Q
9	2	Benjamin Sirimou	Cameroon	20.75	
10	1	Paul Gorries	South Africa	20.76	
11	1	Hadhari Djaffar	Comoros	21.15	
12	2	Morné Nagel	South Africa	21.22	
13	2	Amarildo Almeida	Guinea-Bissau	21.53	
14	1	Mojalefa Mosili	Lesotho	21.67	
	1	Souleymane Meité	Ivory Coast	DNS	
	2	Ibrahim Meité	Ivory Coast	DNS	

=== Final ===
Wind: +0.6 m/s

Rank	Name	Nationality	Time	Notes
1st place, gold medalist(s)	Francis Obikwelu	Nigeria	20.06	GR
2nd place, silver medalist(s)	Joseph Batangdon	Cameroon	20.37	
3rd place, bronze medalist(s)	Daniel Effiong	Nigeria	20.49	
4	Antoine Boussombo	Gabon	20.70	
5	Sunday Emmanuel	Nigeria	20.75	
6	Marcus la Grange	South Africa	20.86	
7	Christie van Wyk	Namibia	20.99	
8	Oumar Loum	Senegal	21.20	
