= Athletics at the 1999 All-Africa Games – Men's long jump =

Athletics at the 1999 All-Africa Games
Track events
100 m	men	women
200 m	men	women
400 m	men	women
800 m	men	women
1500 m	men	women
5000 m	men	women
10,000 m	men	women
100 m hurdles		women
110 m hurdles	men
400 m hurdles	men	women
3000 m steeplechase	men
4×100 m relay	men	women
4×400 m relay	men	women
Road events
Marathon	men	women
10 km walk		women
20 km walk	men
Field events
High jump	men	women
Pole vault	men	women
Long jump	men	women
Triple jump	men	women
Shot put	men	women
Discus throw	men	women
Hammer throw	men	women
Javelin throw	men	women
Combined events
Heptathlon		women
Decathlon	men

The men's long jump event at the 1999 All-Africa Games was held 14–15 September at the Johannesburg Stadium.

== Medalists ==
Gold	Silver	Bronze
Hatem Mersal; Egypt	Georges Téko Folligan; Togo	Mark Anthony Awere; Ghana

== Results ==
=== Qualification ===
Rank	Group	Name	Nationality	Result	Notes
1	A	Hatem Mersal	Egypt	8.05	q
2	A	Georges Téko Folligan	Togo	7.96	q
3	A	Mark Anthony Awere	Ghana	7.79	q
4	B	Idika Uduma	Nigeria	7.65	q
5	B	Franck Zio	Burkina Faso	7.64	q
6	A	Gogo Peters	Nigeria	7.62	q
7	B	Nicolaas Grimbeeck	South Africa	7.59	q
8	B	Gable Garenamotse	Botswana	7.56	q
9	A	Arnaud Casquette	Mauritius	7.52	q
10	B	Ayodele Aladefa	Nigeria	7.41	q
11	A	Danny Beauchamp	Seychelles	7.32	q
12	B	Jonathan Chimier	Mauritius	7.28	q
13	A	Roger Angono	Republic of the Congo	6.98	
14	B	Sérgio Cossa	Mozambique	6.76	
15	B	Kaloka Kazadi	Democratic Republic of the Congo	6.48	
15	A	François Tsissambo	Gabon	6.39	
16	A	Thuso Sehau	Lesotho	5.75	
	A	Wilfred Ndorombo	Central African Republic	DNS	
	B	Thomas Ganda	Sierra Leone	DNS	

=== Final ===
Rank	Name	Nationality	Result	Notes
1st place, gold medalist(s)	Hatem Mersal	Egypt	8.09	
2nd place, silver medalist(s)	Georges Téko Folligan	Togo	8.00	NR
3rd place, bronze medalist(s)	Mark Anthony Awere	Ghana	7.96	
4	Arnaud Casquette	Mauritius	7.76	
5	Ayodele Aladefa	Nigeria	7.72	
6	Gogo Peters	Nigeria	7.69	
7	Danny Beauchamp	Seychelles	7.59	
8	Jonathan Chimier	Mauritius	7.44	
9	Idika Uduma	Nigeria	7.37	
10	Nicolaas Grimbeeck	South Africa	7.36	
11	Gable Garenamotse	Botswana	7.19	
	Franck Zio	Burkina Faso	NM	
