= Athletics at the 1999 All-Africa Games – Men's high jump =

Athletics at the 1999 All-Africa Games
Track events
100 m	men	women
200 m	men	women
400 m	men	women
800 m	men	women
1500 m	men	women
5000 m	men	women
10,000 m	men	women
100 m hurdles		women
110 m hurdles	men
400 m hurdles	men	women
3000 m steeplechase	men
4×100 m relay	men	women
4×400 m relay	men	women
Road events
Marathon	men	women
10 km walk		women
20 km walk	men
Field events
High jump	men	women
Pole vault	men	women
Long jump	men	women
Triple jump	men	women
Shot put	men	women
Discus throw	men	women
Hammer throw	men	women
Javelin throw	men	women
Combined events
Heptathlon		women
Decathlon	men

The men's high jump event at the 1999 All-Africa Games was held on 18 September at the Johannesburg Stadium.

== Results ==
Rank	Name	Nationality	Result	Notes
1st place, gold medalist(s)	Anthony Idiata	Nigeria	2.27	GR, =NR
2nd place, silver medalist(s)	Abderrahmane Hammad	Algeria	2.24	
3rd place, bronze medalist(s)	Malcolm Hendriks	South Africa	2.24	
4	Jacques Freitag	South Africa	2.20	
4	Khemraj Naiko	Mauritius	2.20	
6	Vusumzi Mtshatsheni	South Africa	2.15	
7	Eugéne Ernesta	Seychelles	2.15	
8	Juma Phiri	Zimbabwe	2.00	
9	Hilaire Onwanlele	Gabon	2.00	
10	Maba Ndiaye	Senegal	2.00	
11	Msebe Malinga	Swaziland	2.00	
12	Danny Beauchamp	Seychelles	2.00	
