= Athletics at the 1999 All-Africa Games – Men's 4 × 100 metres relay =

Athletics at the 1999 All-Africa Games
Track events
100 m	men	women
200 m	men	women
400 m	men	women
800 m	men	women
1500 m	men	women
5000 m	men	women
10,000 m	men	women
100 m hurdles		women
110 m hurdles	men
400 m hurdles	men	women
3000 m steeplechase	men
4×100 m relay	men	women
4×400 m relay	men	women
Road events
Marathon	men	women
10 km walk		women
20 km walk	men
Field events
High jump	men	women
Pole vault	men	women
Long jump	men	women
Triple jump	men	women
Shot put	men	women
Discus throw	men	women
Hammer throw	men	women
Javelin throw	men	women
Combined events
Heptathlon		women
Decathlon	men

The men's 4 × 100 metres relay event at the 1999 All-Africa Games was held 15–16 September 1999 at the Johannesburg Stadium.

== Results ==
=== Heats ===
Qualification: First 3 teams of each heat (Q) plus the next 2 fastest (q) qualified for the final.

Rank	Heat	Nation	Athletes	Time	Notes
1	2	Nigeria		39.25	Q
2	1	South Africa		39.45	Q
3	2	Ivory Coast		39.65	Q
4	2	Benin	Issifou Moutalabi, Arcadius Fanou, Pascal Dangbo, Souhalia Alamou	40.17	Q, NR
5	2	Mauritius		40.19	q
6	1	Namibia		40.42	Q
7	2	Gabon		40.82	q
8	1	Republic of the Congo		41.41	Q
9	1	Chad		41.67	
10	1	Lesotho		42.11	
	1	Cameroon		DQ	
	2	Kenya		DNF	
	2	Sierra Leone		DNS	

=== Final ===
Rank	Nation	Athletes	Time	Notes
1st place, gold medalist(s)	Nigeria	Deji Aliu, Daniel Effiong, Chinedu Oriala, Innocent Asonze	38.56	GR, SB
2nd place, silver medalist(s)	South Africa	Morne Nagel, Marcus La Grange, Lee-Roy Newton, Mathew Quinn	38.88	
3rd place, bronze medalist(s)	Ivory Coast		39.09	SB
4	Namibia	?, ?, ?, Frankie Fredericks	39.52	
5	Mauritius		39.83	
6	Gabon		40.20	
7	Benin		40.25	
8	Republic of the Congo		40.98	
