= Athletics at the 1999 All-Africa Games – Women's 800 metres =

Athletics at the 1999 All-Africa Games
Track events
100 m	men	women
200 m	men	women
400 m	men	women
800 m	men	women
1500 m	men	women
5000 m	men	women
10,000 m	men	women
100 m hurdles		women
110 m hurdles	men
400 m hurdles	men	women
3000 m steeplechase	men
4×100 m relay	men	women
4×400 m relay	men	women
Road events
Marathon	men	women
10 km walk		women
20 km walk	men
Field events
High jump	men	women
Pole vault	men	women
Long jump	men	women
Triple jump	men	women
Shot put	men	women
Discus throw	men	women
Hammer throw	men	women
Javelin throw	men	women
Combined events
Heptathlon		women
Decathlon	men

The women's 800 metres event at the 1999 All-Africa Games was held at the Johannesburg Stadium.

== Medalists ==
Gold	Silver	Bronze
Maria Mutola; Mozambique	Nouria Mérah-Benida; Algeria	Grace Birungi; Uganda

== Results ==
=== Heats ===
Qualification: First 2 of each heat (Q) and the next 2 fastest (q) qualified for the final.

Rank	Heat	Name	Nationality	Time	Notes
1	1	Maria Mutola	Mozambique	2:04.69	Q
2	1	Grace Birungi	Uganda	2:04.93	Q
3	1	Hareg Sidelil	Ethiopia	2:05.78	q
4	1	Marian Omajuwa	Nigeria	2:06.24	q
5	1	Akosua Serwah	Ghana	2:06.46	
6	2	Zanelle Grobler	South Africa	2:07.61	Q
7	2	Shura Hutesa	Ethiopia	2:07.82	Q
8	1	Stéphanie Zanga	Cameroon	2:08.65	
9	1	Catherine Maapela	South Africa	2:08.77	
10	2	Nahida Touhami	Algeria	2:08.83	
10	3	Nouria Mérah-Benida	Algeria	2:08.83	Q
12	3	Lwiza John	Tanzania	2:08.87	Q
13	3	Léontine Tsiba	Republic of the Congo	2:09.27	
14	3	Fatma Lanouar	Tunisia	2:09.78	
15	3	Addeh Mwamba	Zambia	2:10.26	
16	3	Jeruto Kiptum	Kenya	2:10.73	
17	2	Agnes Samaria	Namibia	2:11.58	
18	2	Japhet Mwanga	Tanzania	2:12.30	
19	3	Spéciose Gakobwa	Burundi	2:12.38	
20	3	Josiane Abougone	Gabon	2:15.17	
21	1	Euridice Borges Semedo	São Tomé and Príncipe	2:15.59	
22	2	Safia Abukar Hussein	Somalia	2:41.81	
	1	Julia Sakara	Zimbabwe	DNS	
	2	Kutre Dulecha	Ethiopia	DNS	
	2	Ablavi Agbenyeke	Togo	DNS	

=== Final ===
Rank	Name	Nationality	Time	Notes
1st place, gold medalist(s)	Maria Mutola	Mozambique	1:59.73	GR
2nd place, silver medalist(s)	Nouria Mérah-Benida	Algeria	2:00.83	
3rd place, bronze medalist(s)	Grace Birungi	Uganda	2:01.76	
4	Hareg Sidelil	Ethiopia	2:07.46	
5	Zanelle Grobler	South Africa	2:09.10	
6	Marian Omajuwa	Nigeria	2:10.92	
7	Shura Hutesa	Ethiopia	2:20.79	
	Lwiza John	Tanzania	DNF	
