= Athletics at the 1999 All-Africa Games – Men's 110 metres hurdles =

Athletics at the 1999 All-Africa Games
Track events
| 100 m | men | women |
| 200 m | men | women |
| 400 m | men | women |
| 800 m | men | women |
| 1500 m | men | women |
| 5000 m | men | women |
| 10,000 m | men | women |
| 100 m hurdles | | women |
| 110 m hurdles | men |
| 400 m hurdles | men | women |
| 3000 m steeplechase | men |
| 4×100 m relay | men | women |
| 4×400 m relay | men | women |
Road events
| Marathon | men | women |
| 10 km walk | | women |
| 20 km walk | men |
Field events
| High jump | men | women |
| Pole vault | men | women |
| Long jump | men | women |
| Triple jump | men | women |
| Shot put | men | women |
| Discus throw | men | women |
| Hammer throw | men | women |
| Javelin throw | men | women |
Combined events
| Heptathlon | | women |
| Decathlon | men |

The men's 110 metres hurdles event at the 1999 All-Africa Games was held on 15 September 1999 at the Johannesburg Stadium.

== Medalists ==
| Gold | Silver | Bronze |
|---|---|---|
| William Erese; Nigeria | Joseph-Berlioz Randriamihaja; Madagascar | Kehinde Aladefa; Nigeria |

== Results ==
=== Heats ===
Qualification: First 3 of each heat (Q) and the next 2 fastest (q) qualified for the final.

| Rank | Heat | Name | Nationality | Time | Notes |
|---|---|---|---|---|---|
| 1 | 1 | Shaun Bownes | South Africa | 13.50 | Q |
| 2 | 1 | Kehinde Aladefa | Nigeria | 13.60 | Q |
| 3 | 1 | Joseph-Berlioz Randriamihaja | Madagascar | 13.70 | Q |
| 4 | 1 | Félou Doudou Sow | Senegal | 13.80 | q |
| 5 | 1 | Grant Pedro | South Africa | 14.20 | |
| 1 | 2 | William Erese | Nigeria | 13.78 | Q |
| 2 | 2 | Marcus la Grange | South Africa | 13.81 | Q |
| 3 | 2 | Rock Yago Morou | Burkina Faso | 14.10 | Q |
| 4 | 2 | Moses Oyiki | Nigeria | 14.11 | q |
| 5 | 2 | Mohamed Abdel Aal | Egypt | 14.24 | |
| 6 | 2 | Sousa Machaeie | Mozambique | 15.35 | |

=== Final ===
| Rank | Name | Nationality | Time | Notes |
|---|---|---|---|---|
| 1st place, gold medalist(s) | William Erese | Nigeria | 13.71 | GR |
| 2nd place, silver medalist(s) | Joseph-Berlioz Randriamihaja | Madagascar | 13.85 | |
| 3rd place, bronze medalist(s) | Kehinde Aladefa | Nigeria | 13.86 | |
| 4 | Marcus la Grange | South Africa | 13.94 | |
| 5 | Shaun Bownes | South Africa | 14.12 | |
| 6 | Félou Doudou Sow | Senegal | 14.23 | |
| 7 | Moses Oyiki | Nigeria | 14.29 | |
| 8 | Rock Yago Morou | Burkina Faso | 14.42 | |
