= Athletics at the 1999 All-Africa Games – Men's 4 × 400 metres relay =

Athletics at the 1999 All-Africa Games
Track events
| 100 m | men | women |
| 200 m | men | women |
| 400 m | men | women |
| 800 m | men | women |
| 1500 m | men | women |
| 5000 m | men | women |
| 10,000 m | men | women |
| 100 m hurdles | | women |
| 110 m hurdles | men |
| 400 m hurdles | men | women |
| 3000 m steeplechase | men |
| 4×100 m relay | men | women |
| 4×400 m relay | men | women |
Road events
| Marathon | men | women |
| 10 km walk | | women |
| 20 km walk | men |
Field events
| High jump | men | women |
| Pole vault | men | women |
| Long jump | men | women |
| Triple jump | men | women |
| Shot put | men | women |
| Discus throw | men | women |
| Hammer throw | men | women |
| Javelin throw | men | women |
Combined events
| Heptathlon | | women |
| Decathlon | men |

The men's 4 × 400 metres relay event at the 1999 All-Africa Games was held 17–18 September 1999 at the Johannesburg Stadium.

== Results ==
=== Heats ===
Qualification: First 3 teams of each heat (Q) plus the next 2 fastest (q) qualified for the final.

| Rank | Heat | Nation | Athletes | Time | Notes |
|---|---|---|---|---|---|
| 1 | 2 | Kenya | | 3:04.61 | Q |
| 2 | 2 | Nigeria | | 3:04.81 | Q |
| 3 | 1 | South Africa | | 3:04.82 | Q |
| 4 | 1 | Zimbabwe | | 3:05.69 | Q |
| 5 | 1 | Senegal | | 3:06.81 | Q |
| 6 | 1 | Ghana | | 3:08.73 | q |
| 7 | 2 | Botswana | | 3:11.09 | Q |
| 8 | 2 | Republic of the Congo | | 3:14.78 | q |
| 9 | 2 | Lesotho | | 3:18.10 | |
| 10 | 2 | Rwanda | Emmanuel Rubayiza, Pacifique Ayubusa, Pascal Butare, Vital Uwimana | 3:23.08 | NR |

=== Final ===
| Rank | Nation | Athletes | Time | Notes |
|---|---|---|---|---|
| 1st place, gold medalist(s) | Nigeria | Fidelis Gadzama, Jude Monye, Clement Chukwu, Sunday Bada | 3:01.20 | |
| 2nd place, silver medalist(s) | South Africa | Adriaan Botha, Hendrik Mokganyetsi, Hennie Botha, Arnaud Malherbe | 3:01.34 | |
| 3rd place, bronze medalist(s) | Kenya | Kennedy Ochieng, Hillary Maritim, Matilu Abednego, Julius Chepkwony | 3:01.73 | |
| 4 | Senegal | Ousmane Niang, Ibou Faye, Ibrahima Wade, Hachim Ndiaye | 3:02.14 | |
| 5 | Zimbabwe | Jeffrey Masvanhise, Philip Mukomana, Tawanda Chiwira, Kenneth Harnden | 3:02.18 | |
| 6 | Ghana | | 3:10.52 | |
| | Botswana | | DQ | |
| | Republic of the Congo | | DQ | |
