= Athletics at the 1999 All-Africa Games – Men's 400 metres hurdles =

Athletics at the 1999 All-Africa Games
Track events
100 m	men	women
200 m	men	women
400 m	men	women
800 m	men	women
1500 m	men	women
5000 m	men	women
10,000 m	men	women
100 m hurdles		women
110 m hurdles	men
400 m hurdles	men	women
3000 m steeplechase	men
4×100 m relay	men	women
4×400 m relay	men	women
Road events
Marathon	men	women
10 km walk		women
20 km walk	men
Field events
High jump	men	women
Pole vault	men	women
Long jump	men	women
Triple jump	men	women
Shot put	men	women
Discus throw	men	women
Hammer throw	men	women
Javelin throw	men	women
Combined events
Heptathlon		women
Decathlon	men

The men's 400 metres hurdles event at the 1999 All-Africa Games was held 16–17 September 1999 at the Johannesburg Stadium.

== Medalists ==
Gold	Silver	Bronze
Ibou Faye; Senegal	Kenneth Harnden; Zimbabwe	Erick Keter; Kenya

== Results ==
=== Heats ===
Qualification: First 3 of each heat (Q) and the next 2 fastest (q) qualified for the final.

Rank	Heat	Name	Nationality	Time	Notes
1	1	Erick Keter	Kenya	49.48	Q
2	1	Kenneth Harnden	Zimbabwe	49.63	Q
3	2	Hillary Maritim	Kenya	49.83	Q
4	1	Jean-Dominique Diémé	Senegal	49.96	Q
5	2	Ibou Faye	Senegal	49.99	Q
6	2	Yvon Rakotoarimiandry	Madagascar	50.52	Q
7	1	Kenneth Enyiazu	Nigeria	50.53	q
8	2	Sylvester Omodiale	Nigeria	50.71	q
9	1	Hennie Botha	South Africa	50.85	
10	1	El Hefeny Ibrahim	Egypt	51.13	
11	2	Edmond Nartey	Ghana	52.45	
12	2	Médard Makanga	Republic of the Congo	52.60	
13	2	William Loque	Guinea-Bissau	53.76	
	1	Rock Yago Morou	Burkina Faso	DNS	
	2	Samuel Matete	Zambia	DNS	

=== Final ===
Rank	Name	Nationality	Time	Notes
1st place, gold medalist(s)	Ibou Faye	Senegal	48.30	PB
2nd place, silver medalist(s)	Kenneth Harnden	Zimbabwe	48.47	
3rd place, bronze medalist(s)	Erick Keter	Kenya	49.17	
4	Hillary Maritim	Kenya	49.37	
5	Yvon Rakotoarimiandry	Madagascar	49.91	
6	Kenneth Enyiazu	Nigeria	50.22	
7	Jean-Dominique Diémé	Senegal	50.80	
8	Sylvester Omodiale	Nigeria	51.13	
