= Athletics at the 1999 All-Africa Games – Men's 400 metres =

Athletics at the 1999 All-Africa Games
Track events
100 m	men	women
200 m	men	women
400 m	men	women
800 m	men	women
1500 m	men	women
5000 m	men	women
10,000 m	men	women
100 m hurdles		women
110 m hurdles	men
400 m hurdles	men	women
3000 m steeplechase	men
4×100 m relay	men	women
4×400 m relay	men	women
Road events
Marathon	men	women
10 km walk		women
20 km walk	men
Field events
High jump	men	women
Pole vault	men	women
Long jump	men	women
Triple jump	men	women
Shot put	men	women
Discus throw	men	women
Hammer throw	men	women
Javelin throw	men	women
Combined events
Heptathlon		women
Decathlon	men

The men's 400 metres event at the 1999 All-Africa Games was held 14–16 September 1999 at the Johannesburg Stadium.

== Medalists ==
Gold	Silver	Bronze
Kennedy Ochieng; Kenya	Clement Chukwu; Nigeria	Phillip Mukomana; Zimbabwe

== Results ==
=== Heats ===
Qualification: First 3 of each heat (Q) and the next 4 fastest (q) qualified for the semifinals.

Rank	Heat	Name	Nationality	Time	Notes
1	1	Philip Mukomana	Zimbabwe	46.04	Q
2	1	Udeme Ekpeyong	Nigeria	46.13	Q
3	4	Kennedy Ochieng	Kenya	46.31	Q
4	1	Arnaud Malherbe	South Africa	46.32	Q
5	2	Jeffrey Masvanhise	Zimbabwe	46.38	Q
6	3	Julius Chepkwony	Kenya	46.40	Q
7	2	Eric Milazar	Mauritius	46.52	Q
8	1	Adriaan Botha	South Africa	46.72	q
9	3	Sunday Bada	Nigeria	46.91	Q
10	2	Clement Chukwu	Nigeria	47.07	Q
11	1	Abednego Matilu	Kenya	47.10	q
12	3	Ibrahima Wade	Senegal	47.36	Q
13	3	Sofiane Labidi	Tunisia	47.58	q
14	4	Tawanda Chiwira	Zimbabwe	47.62	Q
15	2	Daniel Adomako	Ghana	47.74	q
16	4	Amin Badany Goma'a	Egypt	47.93	Q
17	1	Nathaniel Martey	Ghana	48.27	
18	4	Clement Hakapobo	Zambia	48.33	
19	3	Keketso Phori	Lesotho	48.69	
20	4	Moses Kondowe	Malawi	48.81	
21	2	Narcisse Tevoedjre	Benin	48.98	
22	2	Mahamadou Ibrahim	Niger	49.11	
23	3	Alemayehu Adebo	Ethiopia	49.22	
24	2	Emmanuel Rubayiza	Rwanda	49.99	
25	1	Benjamin Youla	Republic of the Congo	50.33	
26	4	Refiloe Matlanyane	Lesotho	53.29	
	2	Ousmane Niang	Senegal	DNS	
	3	Charles Shaw	Liberia	DNS	

=== Semifinals ===
Qualification: First 3 of each semifinal (Q) and the nest 2 fastest (q) qualified for the final.

Rank	Heat	Name	Nationality	Time	Notes
1	2	Kennedy Ochieng	Kenya	45.11	Q
2	1	Philip Mukomana	Zimbabwe	45.57	Q
3	2	Sunday Bada	Nigeria	45.75	Q
4	1	Julius Chepkwony	Kenya	45.83	Q
5	1	Clement Chukwu	Nigeria	45.85	Q
6	2	Ibrahima Wade	Senegal	45.94	Q
7	2	Arnaud Malherbe	South Africa	45.94	q
8	1	Udeme Ekpeyong	Nigeria	46.03	
8	2	Eric Milazar	Mauritius	46.03	q
10	2	Jeffrey Masvanhise	Zimbabwe	46.30	
11	1	Adriaan Botha	South Africa	46.32	
12	2	Abednego Matilu	Kenya	46.99	
13	1	Tawanda Chiwira	Zimbabwe	47.08	
14	1	Amin Badany Goma'a	Egypt	47.14	
15	2	Sofiane Labidi	Tunisia	47.70	
16	1	Daniel Adomako	Ghana	47.71	

=== Final ===
Rank	Name	Nationality	Time	Notes
1st place, gold medalist(s)	Kennedy Ochieng	Kenya	44.77	PB
2nd place, silver medalist(s)	Clement Chukwu	Nigeria	45.31	
3rd place, bronze medalist(s)	Philip Mukomana	Zimbabwe	45.43	
4	Sunday Bada	Nigeria	45.50	
5	Arnaud Malherbe	South Africa	45.55	
6	Ibrahima Wade	Senegal	45.56	
7	Eric Milazar	Mauritius	45.71	
8	Julius Chepkwony	Kenya	46.54	
