= Athletics at the 1999 All-Africa Games – Men's 5000 metres =

Athletics at the 1999 All-Africa Games
Track events
100 m	men	women
200 m	men	women
400 m	men	women
800 m	men	women
1500 m	men	women
5000 m	men	women
10,000 m	men	women
100 m hurdles		women
110 m hurdles	men
400 m hurdles	men	women
3000 m steeplechase	men
4×100 m relay	men	women
4×400 m relay	men	women
Road events
Marathon	men	women
10 km walk		women
20 km walk	men
Field events
High jump	men	women
Pole vault	men	women
Long jump	men	women
Triple jump	men	women
Shot put	men	women
Discus throw	men	women
Hammer throw	men	women
Javelin throw	men	women
Combined events
Heptathlon		women
Decathlon	men

The men's 5000 metres event at the 1999 All-Africa Games was held at the Johannesburg Stadium.

== Results ==
Rank	Name	Nationality	Time	Notes
1st place, gold medalist(s)	Julius Gitahi	Kenya	13:49.06	
2nd place, silver medalist(s)	Fita Bayisa	Ethiopia	13:49.79	
3rd place, bronze medalist(s)	Thomas Nyariki	Kenya	13:50.40	
4	Dagne Alemu	Ethiopia	13:51.22	
5	Assefa Mezgebu	Ethiopia	13:51.32	
6	Richard Limo	Kenya	13:53.03	
7	Kelebone Makoetlane	Lesotho	14:01.21	
8	Obed Mutanya	Zambia	14:04.65	
9	Mark Hhawu	Tanzania	14:06.26	
10	Richard Mavuso	South Africa	14:13.08	
11	Yonas Kifle	Eritrea	14:17.59	
12	Enoch Skosana	South Africa	14:20.93	
13	Jean-Berchmans Ndayisenga	Burundi	14:21.90	
14	Vital Gahungu	Burundi	14:23.03	
15	Rodwell Kamwendo	Malawi	14:32.18	
16	Audace Niyongabo	Burundi	14:32.24	
17	David Yamayi	Uganda	14:35.76	
18	Aaron Gabonewe	South Africa	14:37.83	
19	Dieudonné Disi	Rwanda	14:45.16	
20	Kabo Gabaseme	Botswana	14:49.18	
21	José Lourenço	Angola	14:53.28	
22	Mohau Lethoasa	Lesotho	15:02.79	
23	Tsegazeab Kiros	Eritrea	15:10.10	
24	Carlos Cangengele	Angola	15:10.89	
25	Amanuel Woldeselassie	Eritrea	15:18.31	
26	Manuel Brito	Cape Verde	16:18.00	
27	José Luis Ebatela Nvo	Equatorial Guinea	16:48.99	
	Abel Chimukoko	Zimbabwe	DNS	
	João N'Tyamba	Angola	DNS	
	Francis Munthall	Malawi	DNS	
