= Athletics at the 1999 All-Africa Games – Women's 200 metres =

Athletics at the 1999 All-Africa Games
Track events
100 m	men	women
200 m	men	women
400 m	men	women
800 m	men	women
1500 m	men	women
5000 m	men	women
10,000 m	men	women
100 m hurdles		women
110 m hurdles	men
400 m hurdles	men	women
3000 m steeplechase	men
4×100 m relay	men	women
4×400 m relay	men	women
Road events
Marathon	men	women
10 km walk		women
20 km walk	men
Field events
High jump	men	women
Pole vault	men	women
Long jump	men	women
Triple jump	men	women
Shot put	men	women
Discus throw	men	women
Hammer throw	men	women
Javelin throw	men	women
Combined events
Heptathlon		women
Decathlon	men

The women's 200 metres event at the 1999 All-Africa Games was held 17–18 September 1999 at the Johannesburg Stadium.

== Medalists ==
Gold	Silver	Bronze
Fatima Yusuf; Nigeria	Myriam Léonie Mani; Cameroon	Monica Twum; Ghana

== Results ==
=== Heats ===
Qualification: First 3 of each heat (Q) and the next 4 fastest (q) qualified for the final.

Rank	Heat	Name	Nationality	Time	Notes
1	1	Fatima Yusuf	Nigeria	22.60	Q
2	1	Myriam Léonie Mani	Cameroon	22.66	Q
3	4	Aida Diop	Senegal	23.12	Q
4	3	Monica Twum	Ghana	23.28	Q
5	4	Heide Seyerling	South Africa	23.31	Q
6	2	Mercy Nku	Nigeria	23.35	Q
7	4	Vida Anim	Ghana	23.36	Q
8	3	Louise Ayétotché	Ivory Coast	23.44	Q
9	3	Wendy Hartman	South Africa	23.44	Q
10	2	Kaltouma Nadjina	Chad	23.54	Q
11	3	Rose Aboaja	Nigeria	23.68	q
12	2	Mary Apio	Uganda	24.15	Q
13	4	Gaily Dube	Zimbabwe	24.17	q
14	1	Charlene Lawrence	South Africa	24.21	Q
15	3	Karima Saad	Egypt	24.30	q
16	4	Veronica Wabukawo	Uganda	24.38	q
17	2	Helena Amoako	Ghana	24.44	
18	2	Joanna Hoareau	Seychelles	24.67	
19	1	Ruth Babela Walozontsi	Republic of the Congo	24.99	
20	1	Lineo Shoai	Lesotho	25.19	
21	3	Denise Ouabangui	Central African Republic	25.39	
22	1	Juliet Tajiri	Uganda	25.41	
23	1	Carol Mokola	Zambia	25.71	
24	2	Phydia Inamahoro	Burkina Faso	28.38	
	2	Makaridja Sanganoko	Ivory Coast	DNS	
	3	Elisa Cossa	Mozambique	DNS	
	4	Anne-Marie Mouri-Nkeng	Cameroon	DNS	

=== Semifinals ===
Qualification: First 4 of each semifinal (Q) qualified for the final.

Rank	Heat	Name	Nationality	Time	Notes
1	1	Fatima Yusuf	Nigeria	22.81	Q
2	1	Myriam Léonie Mani	Cameroon	23.13	Q
3	2	Monica Twum	Ghana	23.14	Q
4	2	Wendy Hartman	South Africa	23.23	Q
5	1	Kaltouma Nadjina	Chad	23.34	Q
6	2	Louise Ayétotché	Ivory Coast	23.35	Q
7	2	Aida Diop	Senegal	23.45	Q
8	1	Vida Anim	Ghana	23.69	Q
9	1	Rose Aboaja	Nigeria	23.73	
10	2	Karima Saad	Egypt	24.21	
11	2	Mary Apio	Uganda	24.25	
12	1	Veronica Wabukawo	Uganda	24.28	
13	1	Charlene Lawrence	South Africa	24.37	
14	2	Gaily Dube	Zimbabwe	24.82	
	1	Heide Seyerling	South Africa	DNS	
	2	Mercy Nku	Nigeria	DNS	

=== Final ===
Wind: +0.1 m/s

Rank	Name	Nationality	Time	Notes
1st place, gold medalist(s)	Fatima Yusuf	Nigeria	22.45	GR
2nd place, silver medalist(s)	Myriam Léonie Mani	Cameroon	22.91	
3rd place, bronze medalist(s)	Monica Twum	Ghana	22.98	
4	Wendy Hartman	South Africa	23.20	
5	Aida Diop	Senegal	23.23	
6	Louise Ayétotché	Ivory Coast	23.45	
7	Kaltouma Nadjina	Chad	23.55	
8	Vida Anim	Ghana	23.81	
