= Athletics at the 1999 All-Africa Games – Men's shot put =

Athletics at the 1999 All-Africa Games
Track events
100 m	men	women
200 m	men	women
400 m	men	women
800 m	men	women
1500 m	men	women
5000 m	men	women
10,000 m	men	women
100 m hurdles		women
110 m hurdles	men
400 m hurdles	men	women
3000 m steeplechase	men
4×100 m relay	men	women
4×400 m relay	men	women
Road events
Marathon	men	women
10 km walk		women
20 km walk	men
Field events
High jump	men	women
Pole vault	men	women
Long jump	men	women
Triple jump	men	women
Shot put	men	women
Discus throw	men	women
Hammer throw	men	women
Javelin throw	men	women
Combined events
Heptathlon		women
Decathlon	men

The men's shot put event at the 1999 All-Africa Games was held at the Johannesburg Stadium.

== Results ==
Rank	Name	Nationality	Result	Notes
1st place, gold medalist(s)	Burger Lambrechts	South Africa	19.50	GR
2nd place, silver medalist(s)	Janus Robberts	South Africa	19.16	
3rd place, bronze medalist(s)	Karel Potgieter	South Africa	18.90	
4	Okechukwu Eziuka	Nigeria	16.88	
5	Mohamed Awad	Egypt	16.79	
6	Mickaël Conjungo	Central African Republic	14.05	
7	Brian Ngoma	Malawi	12.92	
8	Alfred Mokonyana	Lesotho	11.64	
	Quentin Soné Ehawa	Cameroon	DNS	
	Gerald Cudjoe	Ghana	DNS	
	David Fatormah	Liberia	DNS	
	Tony Soalla-Bell	Sierra Leone	DNS	
