= Athletics at the 1999 All-Africa Games – Women's pole vault =

Athletics at the 1999 All-Africa Games
Track events
| 100 m | men | women |
| 200 m | men | women |
| 400 m | men | women |
| 800 m | men | women |
| 1500 m | men | women |
| 5000 m | men | women |
| 10,000 m | men | women |
| 100 m hurdles | | women |
| 110 m hurdles | men |
| 400 m hurdles | men | women |
| 3000 m steeplechase | men |
| 4×100 m relay | men | women |
| 4×400 m relay | men | women |
Road events
| Marathon | men | women |
| 10 km walk | | women |
| 20 km walk | men |
Field events
| High jump | men | women |
| Pole vault | men | women |
| Long jump | men | women |
| Triple jump | men | women |
| Shot put | men | women |
| Discus throw | men | women |
| Hammer throw | men | women |
| Javelin throw | men | women |
Combined events
| Heptathlon | | women |
| Decathlon | men |

The women's pole vault event at the 1999 All-Africa Games was held at the Johannesburg Stadium. It was the first time that this event was contested at the All-Africa Games.

== Results ==
| Rank | Name | Nationality | Result | Notes |
|---|---|---|---|---|
| 1st place, gold medalist(s) | Rika Erasmus | South Africa | 3.60 | GR |
| 2nd place, silver medalist(s) | Elmarie Gerryts | South Africa | 3.60 | |
| | Sonya Ahmed | Egypt | NM | |
| | Syrine Balti | Tunisia | NM | |
