= Athletics at the 1999 All-Africa Games – Women's 100 metres =

Athletics at the 1999 All-Africa Games
Track events
| 100 m | men | women |
| 200 m | men | women |
| 400 m | men | women |
| 800 m | men | women |
| 1500 m | men | women |
| 5000 m | men | women |
| 10,000 m | men | women |
| 100 m hurdles | | women |
| 110 m hurdles | men |
| 400 m hurdles | men | women |
| 3000 m steeplechase | men |
| 4×100 m relay | men | women |
| 4×400 m relay | men | women |
Road events
| Marathon | men | women |
| 10 km walk | | women |
| 20 km walk | men |
Field events
| High jump | men | women |
| Pole vault | men | women |
| Long jump | men | women |
| Triple jump | men | women |
| Shot put | men | women |
| Discus throw | men | women |
| Hammer throw | men | women |
| Javelin throw | men | women |
Combined events
| Heptathlon | | women |
| Decathlon | men |

The women's 100 metres event at the 1999 All-Africa Games was held 14–15 September 1999 at the Johannesburg Stadium.

== Medalists ==
| Gold | Silver | Bronze |
|---|---|---|
| Mercy Nku; Nigeria | Myriam Léonie Mani; Cameroon | Endurance Ojokolo; Nigeria |

== Results ==
=== Heats ===
Qualification: First 2 of each heat (Q) and the next 6 fastest (q) qualified for the semifinals.

| Rank | Heat | Name | Nationality | Time | Notes |
|---|---|---|---|---|---|
| 1 | 2 | Myriam Léonie Mani | Cameroon | 11.22 | Q |
| 2 | 2 | Mercy Nku | Nigeria | 11.22 | Q |
| 3 | 3 | Joan Uduak Ekah | Nigeria | 11.28 | Q |
| 4 | 5 | Hanitriniaina Rakotondrabe | Madagascar | 11.44 | Q |
| 5 | 2 | Monica Twum | Ghana | 11.52 | q |
| 6 | 4 | Louise Ayétotché | Ivory Coast | 11.59 | Q |
| 7 | 4 | Wendy Hartman | South Africa | 11.62 | Q |
| 7 | 5 | Elisa Cossa | Mozambique | 11.62 | Q, PB |
| 9 | 1 | Endurance Ojokolo | Nigeria | 11.65 | Q |
| 10 | 5 | Aminata Diouf | Senegal | 11.71 | q |
| 11 | 3 | Makaridja Sanganoko | Ivory Coast | 11.75 | Q |
| 11 | 5 | Dora Manu | Ghana | 11.75 | q |
| 13 | 1 | Laure Kuetey | Benin | 11.87 | Q |
| 14 | 2 | Dikeledi Moropane | South Africa | 11.90 | q |
| 15 | 3 | Joanna Hoareau | Seychelles | 11.91 | q |
| 15 | 5 | Kadiatou Camara | Mali | 11.91 | q |
| 15 | 3 | Anne-Marie Mouri-Nkeng | Cameroon | 11.95 | |
| 17 | 5 | Karima Saad | Egypt | 11.98 | |
| 18 | 2 | Gailey Dube | Zimbabwe | 12.00 | |
| 19 | 5 | Anais Oyembo | Gabon | 12.14 | |
| 20 | 4 | Esther Dankwah | Ghana | 12.15 | |
| 21 | 1 | Minette Albertse | South Africa | 12.21 | |
| 22 | 2 | Indussa Nidjad | Benin | 12.28 | |
| 23 | 1 | Ruth Babela Walozontsi | Republic of the Congo | 12.53 | |
| 24 | 4 | Geneviève Obone | Gabon | 12.57 | |
| 25 | 2 | Sylla M'Mah Touré | Guinea | 12.70 | |
| 26 | 1 | Phydia Inamahoro | Burkina Faso | 13.93 | |
| | 1 | Juliet Tajiri | Uganda | DNS | |
| | 1 | Emmanuella Kogolama | Central African Republic | DNS | |
| | 3 | Veronica Wabukawo | Uganda | DNS | |
| | 3 | Gladys Thompson | Liberia | DNS | |
| | 3 | Mary Apio | Uganda | DNS | |
| | 4 | Joselyn Thomas | Liberia | DNS | |
| | 4 | Ekundayo Williams | Sierra Leone | DNS | |
| | 4 | Mari Paz Mosanga | Equatorial Guinea | DNS | |

=== Semifinals ===
Qualification: First 4 of each semifinal (Q) qualified for the final.

| Rank | Heat | Name | Nationality | Time | Notes |
|---|---|---|---|---|---|
| 1 | 2 | Mercy Nku | Nigeria | 11.11 | Q |
| 2 | 1 | Endurance Ojokolo | Nigeria | 11.19 | Q |
| 3 | 2 | Joan Uduak Ekah | Nigeria | 11.24 | Q |
| 4 | 1 | Myriam Léonie Mani | Cameroon | 11.28 | Q |
| 5 | 1 | Wendy Hartman | South Africa | 11.40 | Q |
| 6 | 1 | Louise Ayétotché | Ivory Coast | 11.48 | Q |
| 7 | 2 | Hanitriniaina Rakotondrabe | Madagascar | 11.49 | Q |
| 8 | 2 | Monica Twum | Ghana | 11.49 | Q |
| 9 | 2 | Elisa Cossa | Mozambique | 11.64 | |
| 10 | 1 | Aminata Diouf | Senegal | 11.81 | |
| 11 | 1 | Dora Manu | Ghana | 11.82 | |
| 12 | 1 | Laure Kuetey | Benin | 11.87 | |
| 13 | 2 | Makaridja Sanganoko | Ivory Coast | 11.93 | |
| 14 | 2 | Joanna Hoareau | Seychelles | 11.94 | |
| 15 | 2 | Dikeledi Moropane | South Africa | 11.98 | |
| 16 | 1 | Kadiatou Camara | Mali | 11.99 | |

=== Final ===
Wind: +0.1 m/s

| Rank | Name | Nationality | Time | Notes |
|---|---|---|---|---|
| 1st place, gold medalist(s) | Mercy Nku | Nigeria | 11.03 | GR |
| 2nd place, silver medalist(s) | Myriam Léonie Mani | Cameroon | 11.24 | |
| 3rd place, bronze medalist(s) | Endurance Ojokolo | Nigeria | 11.25 | |
| 4 | Joan Uduak Ekah | Nigeria | 11.26 | |
| 5 | Wendy Hartman | South Africa | 11.39 | |
| 6 | Hanitriniaina Rakotondrabe | Madagascar | 11.41 | |
| 7 | Monica Twum | Ghana | 11.48 | |
| 8 | Louise Ayétotché | Ivory Coast | 11.61 | |
