= Athletics at the 1999 All-Africa Games – Women's hammer throw =

Athletics at the 1999 All-Africa Games
Track events
100 m	men	women
200 m	men	women
400 m	men	women
800 m	men	women
1500 m	men	women
5000 m	men	women
10,000 m	men	women
100 m hurdles		women
110 m hurdles	men
400 m hurdles	men	women
3000 m steeplechase	men
4×100 m relay	men	women
4×400 m relay	men	women
Road events
Marathon	men	women
10 km walk		women
20 km walk	men
Field events
High jump	men	women
Pole vault	men	women
Long jump	men	women
Triple jump	men	women
Shot put	men	women
Discus throw	men	women
Hammer throw	men	women
Javelin throw	men	women
Combined events
Heptathlon		women
Decathlon	men

The women's hammer throw event at the 1999 All-Africa Games was held on 17 September at the Johannesburg Stadium. It was the first time that this event took place at the All-Africa Games.

== Results ==
Rank	Name	Nationality	Result	Notes
1st place, gold medalist(s)	Caroline Fournier	Mauritius	58.83	
2nd place, silver medalist(s)	Elmarie Knoetzen	South Africa	58.74	
3rd place, bronze medalist(s)	Marwa Ahmed Hussein	Egypt	55.25	
4	Marilize Engelbrecht	South Africa	51.65	
5	Djida Nawel Ialloulene	Algeria	50.15	
6	Mélissa Sooprayen	Mauritius	46.91	
7	Joy Mayaki	Nigeria	46.10	
8	Ange-Doris Ratsimbazafy	Madagascar	45.88	
9	Amuche Egbunine	Nigeria	45.30	
	Monia Kari	Tunisia	DNS	
