= Athletics at the 1999 All-Africa Games – Women's heptathlon =

Athletics at the 1999 All-Africa Games
Track events
100 m	men	women
200 m	men	women
400 m	men	women
800 m	men	women
1500 m	men	women
5000 m	men	women
10,000 m	men	women
100 m hurdles		women
110 m hurdles	men
400 m hurdles	men	women
3000 m steeplechase	men
4×100 m relay	men	women
4×400 m relay	men	women
Road events
Marathon	men	women
10 km walk		women
20 km walk	men
Field events
High jump	men	women
Pole vault	men	women
Long jump	men	women
Triple jump	men	women
Shot put	men	women
Discus throw	men	women
Hammer throw	men	women
Javelin throw	men	women
Combined events
Heptathlon		women
Decathlon	men

The women's heptathlon event at the 1999 All-Africa Games was held 16–17 September at the Johannesburg Stadium.

== Results ==
The highest mark recorded in each event is highlighted in yellow

Rank	Athlete	Nationality	100m H	HJ	SP	200m	LJ	JT	800m	Points	Notes
1st place, gold medalist(s)	Maralize Visser-Fouché	South Africa	14.01	1.73	13.68	24.03	5.62	36.42	2:31.21	5631	
2nd place, silver medalist(s)	Patience Itanyi	Nigeria	13.52	1.70	9.57	24.67	6.31	35.82	2:28.48	5565	
3rd place, bronze medalist(s)	Oluchi Elechi	Nigeria	14.70	1.58	13.32	25.39	6.39	41.48	2:31.44	5537	
4	Margaret Simpson	Ghana	14.75	1.73	9.15	24.96	5.25	38.57	2:30.14	5089	
5	Enezenaide Gomes	São Tomé and Príncipe	14.83	1.79	11.68	27.09	5.81	37.87	2:58.16	4974	
6	Mary Dolly Oyono	Cameroon	14.80	1.61	11.94	26.32	5.70	33.56	2:44.36	4868	
7	Stéphanie Domaingue	Mauritius	14.37	1.58	9.34	26.19	5.71	33.11	2:32.48	4866	
	Paulette Mendy	Senegal	DNS	–	–	–	–	–	–	DNS	
