= Athletics at the 1999 All-Africa Games – Women's 5000 metres =

Athletics at the 1999 All-Africa Games
Track events
| 100 m | men | women |
| 200 m | men | women |
| 400 m | men | women |
| 800 m | men | women |
| 1500 m | men | women |
| 5000 m | men | women |
| 10,000 m | men | women |
| 100 m hurdles | | women |
| 110 m hurdles | men |
| 400 m hurdles | men | women |
| 3000 m steeplechase | men |
| 4×100 m relay | men | women |
| 4×400 m relay | men | women |
Road events
| Marathon | men | women |
| 10 km walk | | women |
| 20 km walk | men |
Field events
| High jump | men | women |
| Pole vault | men | women |
| Long jump | men | women |
| Triple jump | men | women |
| Shot put | men | women |
| Discus throw | men | women |
| Hammer throw | men | women |
| Javelin throw | men | women |
Combined events
| Heptathlon | | women |
| Decathlon | men |

The women's 5000 metres event at the 1999 All-Africa Games was held at the Johannesburg Stadium.

== Results ==
| Rank | Name | Nationality | Time | Notes |
|---|---|---|---|---|
| 1st place, gold medalist(s) | Ayelech Worku | Ethiopia | 15:38.22 | |
| 2nd place, silver medalist(s) | Elana Meyer | South Africa | 15:42.76 | |
| 3rd place, bronze medalist(s) | Vivian Cheruiyot | Kenya | 15:42.79 | |
| 4 | Werknesh Kidane | Ethiopia | 15:51.37 | |
| 5 | Yemenashu Taye | Ethiopia | 16:10.55 | |
| 6 | Dorcus Inzikuru | Uganda | 16:26.64 | |
| 7 | Samukeliso Moyo | Zimbabwe | 16:26.64 | |
| 8 | Viola Kibiwot | Kenya | 16:46.73 | |
| 9 | Simret Sultan | Eritrea | 17:01.80 | |
| 10 | Diane Nukuri | Burundi | 17:04.75 | |
| 11 | Hawa Hamis Hussein | Tanzania | 17:05.23 | |
| 12 | Siphulwazi Sibindi | Zimbabwe | 17:11.35 | |
| 13 | Nebiat Habtemariam | Eritrea | 17:28.35 | |
| 14 | Grace Chesang | Uganda | 17:29.29 | |
| 15 | Agnes Chikwakwa | Malawi | 18:09.96 | |
| | Carlien Cornelissen | South Africa | DNF | |
