= Athletics at the 1999 All-Africa Games – Women's 10,000 metres =

Athletics at the 1999 All-Africa Games
Track events
100 m	men	women
200 m	men	women
400 m	men	women
800 m	men	women
1500 m	men	women
5000 m	men	women
10,000 m	men	women
100 m hurdles		women
110 m hurdles	men
400 m hurdles	men	women
3000 m steeplechase	men
4×100 m relay	men	women
4×400 m relay	men	women
Road events
Marathon	men	women
10 km walk		women
20 km walk	men
Field events
High jump	men	women
Pole vault	men	women
Long jump	men	women
Triple jump	men	women
Shot put	men	women
Discus throw	men	women
Hammer throw	men	women
Javelin throw	men	women
Combined events
Heptathlon		women
Decathlon	men

The women's 10,000 metres event at the 1999 All-Africa Games was held at the Johannesburg Stadium.

== Results ==
Rank	Name	Nationality	Time	Notes
1st place, gold medalist(s)	Gete Wami	Ethiopia	32:08.15	
2nd place, silver medalist(s)	Merima Hashim	Ethiopia	32:16.24	
3rd place, bronze medalist(s)	Leah Malot	Kenya	32:36.02	
4	Merima Denboba	Ethiopia	32:58.68	
5	Sharon Cherop	Kenya	35:14.41	
6	Simret Sultan	Eritrea	35:20.11	
7	Nebiat Habtemariam	Eritrea	35:35.46	
8	Jane Makombe	Zimbabwe	36:42.43	
9	Lungile Mamba	Swaziland	36:46.75	
10	Azwindini Lukhwareni	South Africa	37:24.30	
	Agnes Chikwakwa	Malawi	DNS	
	Restituta Joseph Kemi	Tanzania	DNS	
	Elizabeth Mongudhi	Namibia	DNS	
	Siphulwazi Sibindi	Zimbabwe	DNS	
