= Athletics at the 1999 All-Africa Games – Men's 10,000 metres =

Athletics at the 1999 All-Africa Games
Track events
100 m	men	women
200 m	men	women
400 m	men	women
800 m	men	women
1500 m	men	women
5000 m	men	women
10,000 m	men	women
100 m hurdles		women
110 m hurdles	men
400 m hurdles	men	women
3000 m steeplechase	men
4×100 m relay	men	women
4×400 m relay	men	women
Road events
Marathon	men	women
10 km walk		women
20 km walk	men
Field events
High jump	men	women
Pole vault	men	women
Long jump	men	women
Triple jump	men	women
Shot put	men	women
Discus throw	men	women
Hammer throw	men	women
Javelin throw	men	women
Combined events
Heptathlon		women
Decathlon	men

The men's 10,000 metres event at the 1999 All-Africa Games was held on 15 September at the Johannesburg Stadium.

== Results ==
Rank	Name	Nationality	Time	Notes
1st place, gold medalist(s)	Assefa Mezgebu	Ethiopia	28:12.15	
2nd place, silver medalist(s)	David Chelule	Kenya	28:13.71	
3rd place, bronze medalist(s)	Habte Jifar	Ethiopia	28:15.11	
4	Simon Maina	Kenya	28:16.59	
5	Benjamin Maiyo	Kenya	28:18.78	
6	Girma Tolla	Ethiopia	28:21.22	
7	Hendrick Ramaala	South Africa	28:22.79	
8	Isidore Nizigiyimana	Burundi	29:45.73	
9	Adel Addili	Libya	29:48.93	
10	Patrick Kaotsane	South Africa	29:52.83	
11	Yonas Kifle	Eritrea	30:03.73	
12	Pasteur Nyabenda	Burundi	30:09.60	
13	Carlos Cangengele	Angola	32:03.18	
14	Joseph Nsengiyumva	Rwanda	32:13.55	
15	Rodwell Kamwendo	Malawi	33:13.62	
	Jama Aden Abdikarim	Somalia	DNF	
	Mokhejame Lesenyeho	Lesotho	DNF	
	Abel Chimukoko	Zimbabwe	DNF	
	Tsegazeab Kiros	Eritrea	DNF	
	Kaelo Masalagae	Botswana	DNF	
	Jean-Berchmans Ndayisenga	Burundi	DNS	
	Joāo N'Tyamba	Angola	DNS	
	Michael Sarwath	Tanzania	DNS	
	David Yamayi	Uganda	DNS	
