= Athletics at the 1999 All-Africa Games – Men's discus throw =

Athletics at the 1999 All-Africa Games
Track events
100 m	men	women
200 m	men	women
400 m	men	women
800 m	men	women
1500 m	men	women
5000 m	men	women
10,000 m	men	women
100 m hurdles		women
110 m hurdles	men
400 m hurdles	men	women
3000 m steeplechase	men
4×100 m relay	men	women
4×400 m relay	men	women
Road events
Marathon	men	women
10 km walk		women
20 km walk	men
Field events
High jump	men	women
Pole vault	men	women
Long jump	men	women
Triple jump	men	women
Shot put	men	women
Discus throw	men	women
Hammer throw	men	women
Javelin throw	men	women
Combined events
Heptathlon		women
Decathlon	men

The men's discus throw event at the 1999 All-Africa Games was held on 15 September at the Johannesburg Stadium.

== Results ==
Rank	Name	Nationality	Result	Notes
1st place, gold medalist(s)	Frantz Kruger	South Africa	61.02	
2nd place, silver medalist(s)	Frits Potgieter	South Africa	60.59	
3rd place, bronze medalist(s)	Mickaël Conjungo	Central African Republic	57.09	
4	Janus Robberts	South Africa	56.82	
5	Modu Camara	Mali	45.09	
6	Alfred Mokonyana	Lesotho	33.08	
	Remiqious Mumbire	Zimbabwe	DNS	
