= Athletics at the 1999 All-Africa Games – Women's 400 metres =

Athletics at the 1999 All-Africa Games
Track events
| 100 m | men | women |
| 200 m | men | women |
| 400 m | men | women |
| 800 m | men | women |
| 1500 m | men | women |
| 5000 m | men | women |
| 10,000 m | men | women |
| 100 m hurdles | | women |
| 110 m hurdles | men |
| 400 m hurdles | men | women |
| 3000 m steeplechase | men |
| 4×100 m relay | men | women |
| 4×400 m relay | men | women |
Road events
| Marathon | men | women |
| 10 km walk | | women |
| 20 km walk | men |
Field events
| High jump | men | women |
| Pole vault | men | women |
| Long jump | men | women |
| Triple jump | men | women |
| Shot put | men | women |
| Discus throw | men | women |
| Hammer throw | men | women |
| Javelin throw | men | women |
Combined events
| Heptathlon | | women |
| Decathlon | men |

The women's 400 metres event at the 1999 All-Africa Games was held 15–16 September 1999 at the Johannesburg Stadium.

== Medalists ==
| Gold | Silver | Bronze |
|---|---|---|
| Falilat Ogunkoya; Nigeria | Olabisi Afolabi; Nigeria | Amy Mbacké Thiam; Senegal |

== Results ==
=== Heats ===
Qualification: First 3 of each heat (Q) and the next 2 fastest (q) qualified for the final.

| Rank | Heat | Name | Nationality | Time | Notes |
|---|---|---|---|---|---|
| 1 | 1 | Olabisi Afolabi | Nigeria | 50.91 | Q |
| 2 | 1 | Falilat Ogunkoya | Nigeria | 50.91 | Q |
| 3 | 2 | Charity Opara | Nigeria | 51.36 | Q |
| 4 | 2 | Amy Mbacké Thiam | Senegal | 51.44 | Q |
| 5 | 2 | Claudine Komgang | Cameroon | 51.58 | Q |
| 6 | 1 | Mireille Nguimgo | Cameroon | 52.06 | Q |
| 7 | 2 | Kaltouma Nadjina | Chad | 52.11 | q |
| 8 | 1 | Heide Seyerling | South Africa | 52.95 | q |
| 9 | 1 | Veronica Bawuah | Ghana | 54.41 | |
| 10 | 1 | Mary Apio | Uganda | 54.66 | |
| 11 | 1 | Chitra Mooloo | Mauritius | 54.50 | |
| 12 | 2 | Leanie van der Walt | South Africa | 55.03 | |
| 13 | 2 | Carol Mokola | Zambia | 58.50 | |
| 14 | 2 | Donata Mutegwamaso | Rwanda | 1:00.08 | |
| 15 | 1 | Brigitte Nganaye | Central African Republic | 1:04.45 | |

=== Final ===
| Rank | Name | Nationality | Time | Notes |
|---|---|---|---|---|
| 1st place, gold medalist(s) | Falilat Ogunkoya | Nigeria | 50.02 | |
| 2nd place, silver medalist(s) | Olabisi Afolabi | Nigeria | 50.34 | |
| 3rd place, bronze medalist(s) | Amy Mbacké Thiam | Senegal | 50.95 | |
| 4 | Claudine Komgang | Cameroon | 51.21 | |
| 5 | Charity Opara | Nigeria | 51.29 | |
| 6 | Mireille Nguimgo | Cameroon | 52.06 | |
| 7 | Heide Seyerling | South Africa | 52.27 | |
| 8 | Kaltouma Nadjina | Chad | 52.47 | |
