= Athletics at the 1999 All-Africa Games – Women's shot put =

Athletics at the 1999 All-Africa Games
Track events
| 100 m | men | women |
| 200 m | men | women |
| 400 m | men | women |
| 800 m | men | women |
| 1500 m | men | women |
| 5000 m | men | women |
| 10,000 m | men | women |
| 100 m hurdles | | women |
| 110 m hurdles | men |
| 400 m hurdles | men | women |
| 3000 m steeplechase | men |
| 4×100 m relay | men | women |
| 4×400 m relay | men | women |
Road events
| Marathon | men | women |
| 10 km walk | | women |
| 20 km walk | men |
Field events
| High jump | men | women |
| Pole vault | men | women |
| Long jump | men | women |
| Triple jump | men | women |
| Shot put | men | women |
| Discus throw | men | women |
| Hammer throw | men | women |
| Javelin throw | men | women |
Combined events
| Heptathlon | | women |
| Decathlon | men |

The women's shot put event at the 1999 All-Africa Games was held at the Johannesburg Stadium.

== Results ==
| Rank | Name | Nationality | Result | Notes |
|---|---|---|---|---|
| 1st place, gold medalist(s) | Vivian Chukwuemeka | Nigeria | 16.72 | |
| 2nd place, silver medalist(s) | Veronica Abrahamse | South Africa | 16.53 | |
| 3rd place, bronze medalist(s) | Maranelle du Toit | South Africa | 16.45 | |
| 4 | Wafaa Ismail Baghdadi | Egypt | 15.70 | |
| 5 | Amel Ben Khaled | Tunisia | 15.55 | |
| 6 | Felicia Nkiru Ojiego | Nigeria | 14.32 | |
| 7 | Lezelle Duvenage | South Africa | 13.30 | |
| 8 | Joyce Kiume | Kenya | 13.26 | |
| 9 | Maria Manhiça | Mozambique | 12.80 | |
| | Patience Djato | Ghana | DNS | |
| | Nadège Nakombo | Central African Republic | DNS | |
