= Athletics at the 1999 All-Africa Games – Women's 400 metres hurdles =

Athletics at the 1999 All-Africa Games
Track events
100 m	men	women
200 m	men	women
400 m	men	women
800 m	men	women
1500 m	men	women
5000 m	men	women
10,000 m	men	women
100 m hurdles		women
110 m hurdles	men
400 m hurdles	men	women
3000 m steeplechase	men
4×100 m relay	men	women
4×400 m relay	men	women
Road events
Marathon	men	women
10 km walk		women
20 km walk	men
Field events
High jump	men	women
Pole vault	men	women
Long jump	men	women
Triple jump	men	women
Shot put	men	women
Discus throw	men	women
Hammer throw	men	women
Javelin throw	men	women
Combined events
Heptathlon		women
Decathlon	men

The women's 400 metres hurdles event at the 1999 All-Africa Games was held 14–15 September 1999 at the Johannesburg Stadium.

== Medalists ==
Gold	Silver	Bronze
Mame Tacko Diouf; Senegal	Surita Febbraio; South Africa	Saidat Onanuga; Nigeria

== Results ==
=== Heats ===
Qualification: First 3 of each heat (Q) and the next 2 fastest (q) qualified for the final.

Rank	Heat	Name	Nationality	Time	Notes
1	1	Mame Tacko Diouf	Senegal	56.62	Q
2	2	Omolade Akinremi	Nigeria	56.80	Q
3	1	Saidat Onanuga	Nigeria	57.63	Q
4	2	Surita Febbraio	South Africa	58.38	Q
5	2	Gnima Touré	Senegal	58.45	Q
6	1	Cendrino Razaiarimalala	Madagascar	58.61	Q
7	2	Aurélie Jonary	Madagascar	1:00.07	q
8	1	Adri Vlok	South Africa	1:00.08	q
9	2	Nivea Sekele	South Africa	1:02.80	
10	2	Corrinne Emamally	Mauritius	1:04.39	
	1	Delfina Joaquim	Angola	DNS	

=== Final ===
Rank	Name	Nationality	Time	Notes
1st place, gold medalist(s)	Mame Tacko Diouf	Senegal	55.69	
2nd place, silver medalist(s)	Surita Febbraio	South Africa	57.11	
3rd place, bronze medalist(s)	Saidat Onanuga	Nigeria	58.34	
4	Gnima Touré	Senegal	59.02	
5	Cendrino Razaiarimalala	Madagascar	59.33	
6	Omolade Akinremi	Nigeria	59.53	
7	Adri Vlok	South Africa	1:00.37	
8	Aurélie Jonary	Madagascar	1:00.95	
