= Athletics at the 1999 All-Africa Games – Men's 800 metres =

Athletics at the 1999 All-Africa Games
Track events
100 m	men	women
200 m	men	women
400 m	men	women
800 m	men	women
1500 m	men	women
5000 m	men	women
10,000 m	men	women
100 m hurdles		women
110 m hurdles	men
400 m hurdles	men	women
3000 m steeplechase	men
4×100 m relay	men	women
4×400 m relay	men	women
Road events
Marathon	men	women
10 km walk		women
20 km walk	men
Field events
High jump	men	women
Pole vault	men	women
Long jump	men	women
Triple jump	men	women
Shot put	men	women
Discus throw	men	women
Hammer throw	men	women
Javelin throw	men	women
Combined events
Heptathlon		women
Decathlon	men

The men's 800 metres event at the 1999 All-Africa Games was held at the Johannesburg Stadium.

== Medalists ==
Gold	Silver	Bronze
Japheth Kimutai; Kenya	Djabir Saïd-Guerni; Algeria	Hezekiél Sepeng; South Africa

== Results ==
=== Heats ===
Qualification: First 3 of each heat (Q) and the next 4 fastest (q) qualified for the semifinals.

Rank	Heat	Name	Nationality	Time	Notes
1	3	Savieri Ngidhi	Zimbabwe	1:48.25	Q
2	3	Glody Dube	Botswana	1:48.39	Q
3	3	Johan Botha	South Africa	1:48.47	Q
4	3	Berhanu Alemu	Ethiopia	1:48.49	q
5	3	Paskar Owor	Uganda	1:48.89	q
6	2	Djabir Saïd-Guerni	Algeria	1:49.86	Q
7	2	Benjamin Kipkurui	Kenya	1:49.87	Q
8	1	Japheth Kimutai	Kenya	1:50.02	Q
9	1	Crispen Mutakanyi	Zimbabwe	1:50.72	Q
10	3	Francis Munthali	Malawi	1:50.79	q
11	3	Pascal Murengerantwari	Burundi	1:51.75	q
12	2	Prince Mumba	Zambia	1:51.81	Q
13	2	Pacifique Ayubusa	Rwanda	1:51.89	
14	1	Lucky Hadebe	South Africa	1:52.00	Q
15	4	Kennedy Kimwetich	Kenya	1:52.45	Q
16	4	Hezekiél Sepeng	South Africa	1:52.49	Q
17	4	Kennedy Osei	Ghana	1:52.68	Q
18	1	Yaccob Furtenato	Eritrea	1:53.79	
19	4	Bakulu Yambo	Democratic Republic of the Congo	1:55.11	
20	4	Yassin Mahamoud	Somalia	1:55.14	
21	2	Christophe Manirakiza	Burundi	1:55.17	
22	1	Menhard Luhanya	Malawi	1:55.79	
23	4	Reuben Silwimba	Zambia	1:56.12	
24	4	Karabo Mphafi	Lesotho	1:56.62	
25	2	Jorge Duvane	Mozambique	2:00.28	
	2	Assane Diallo	Senegal	DNF	
	3	David Molise	Lesotho	DNF	
	1	Akim Balogoun	Benin	DNS	
	1	Adem Hecini	Algeria	DNS	
	1	Chipako Chungu	Zambia	DNS	
	2	Moses Kondowe	Malawi	DNS	
	4	Faissoil Ben	Comoros	DNS	
	4	Souleymane Meité	Ivory Coast	DNS	

=== Semifinals ===
Qualification: First 3 of each semifinal (Q) and the nest 2 fastest (q) qualified for the final.

Rank	Heat	Name	Nationality	Time	Notes
1	1	Hezekiél Sepeng	South Africa	1:46.85	Q
2	1	Kennedy Kimwetich	Kenya	1:46.87	Q
3	1	Savieri Ngidhi	Zimbabwe	1:46.99	Q
4	1	Johan Botha	South Africa	1:47.12	q
5	2	Japheth Kimutai	Kenya	1:47.17	Q
6	2	Djabir Saïd-Guerni	Algeria	1:47.49	Q
7	2	Benjamin Kipkurui	Kenya	1:47.54	Q
8	1	Glody Dube	Botswana	1:47.96	q
9	1	Berhanu Alemu	Ethiopia	1:48.35	
10	2	Crispen Mutakanyi	Zimbabwe	1:48.45	
11	1	Pascal Murengerantwari	Burundi	1:48.62	
12	2	Paskar Owor	Uganda	1:49.23	
13	2	Lucky Hadebe	South Africa	1:50.58	
14	2	Prince Mumba	Zambia	1:51.02	
15	2	Francis Munthali	Malawi	1:51.53	
	1	Kennedy Osei	Ghana	DNS	

=== Final ===
Rank	Name	Nationality	Time	Notes
1st place, gold medalist(s)	Japheth Kimutai	Kenya	1:44.91	GR
2nd place, silver medalist(s)	Djabir Saïd-Guerni	Algeria	1:45.32	
3rd place, bronze medalist(s)	Hezekiél Sepeng	South Africa	1:45.58	
4	Benjamin Kipkurui	Kenya	1:45.96	
5	Kennedy Kimwetich	Kenya	1:46.24	
6	Johan Botha	South Africa	1:47.31	
7	Glody Dube	Botswana	1:47.64	
8	Savieri Ngidhi	Zimbabwe	1:50.85	
