= Athletics at the 1999 All-Africa Games – Men's 1500 metres =

Athletics at the 1999 All-Africa Games
Track events
100 m	men	women
200 m	men	women
400 m	men	women
800 m	men	women
1500 m	men	women
5000 m	men	women
10,000 m	men	women
100 m hurdles		women
110 m hurdles	men
400 m hurdles	men	women
3000 m steeplechase	men
4×100 m relay	men	women
4×400 m relay	men	women
Road events
Marathon	men	women
10 km walk		women
20 km walk	men
Field events
High jump	men	women
Pole vault	men	women
Long jump	men	women
Triple jump	men	women
Shot put	men	women
Discus throw	men	women
Hammer throw	men	women
Javelin throw	men	women
Combined events
Heptathlon		women
Decathlon	men

The men's 1500 metres event at the 1999 All-Africa Games was held at the Johannesburg Stadium.

== Medalists ==
Gold	Silver	Bronze
Hailu Mekonnen; Ethiopia	David Lelei; Kenya	Frederick Cheruiyot; Kenya

== Results ==
=== Heats ===
Qualification: First 4 of each heat (Q) and the next 4 fastest (q) qualified for the final.

Rank	Heat	Name	Nationality	Time	Notes
1	1	Daniel Zegeye	Ethiopia	3:42.23	Q
2	1	Frederick Cheruiyot	Kenya	3:42.29	Q
3	1	Julius Achon	Uganda	3:42.97	Q
4	1	Ali Hakimi	Tunisia	3:43.11	Q
5	1	Julius Ogwang	Uganda	3:43.11	q
6	1	Bonaventure Niyonizigiye	Burundi	3:43.84	q
7	1	Lambert Ndayikeza	Burundi	3:47.68	q
8	2	David Lelei	Kenya	3:48.89	Q
9	2	Sammy Mutai	Kenya	3:48.93	Q
10	2	Hailu Mekonnen	Ethiopia	3:49.12	Q
11	2	Mahmud Aden Ibrahim	Somalia	3:49.58	Q
12	2	Paskar Owor	Uganda	3:49.84	q
13	2	Esau Faro	South Africa	3:50.71	
14	2	Ali El-Zaidi	Libya	3:53.60	
15	2	Francis Munthali	Malawi	3:53.87	
16	1	Yaccob Furtenato	Eritrea	3:58.15	
17	2	Amanuel Woldeselassie	Eritrea	3:58.69	
18	2	Mohau Lethoasa	Lesotho	3:59.90	
19	1	Kelebone Makoetlane	Lesotho	4:06.87	
	1	Alexis Sharangabo	Rwanda	DNF	
	2	Jean-Marc Léandro	Gabon	DNF	
	1	Chipako Chungu	Zambia	DNS	
	1	Kondeabalo Pakpessan	Togo	DNS	
	1	Prince Mumba	Zambia	DNS	
	2	Reuben Silwimba	Zambia	DNS	
	2	Mark Hhawu	Tanzania	DNS	
	2	José Lourenço	Angola	DNS	

=== Final ===
Rank	Name	Nationality	Time	Notes
1st place, gold medalist(s)	Hailu Mekonnen	Ethiopia	3:39.73	
2nd place, silver medalist(s)	David Lelei	Kenya	3:40.46	
3rd place, bronze medalist(s)	Frederick Cheruiyot	Kenya	3:41.21	
4	Daniel Zegeye	Ethiopia	3:41.97	
5	Ali Hakimi	Tunisia	3:43.04	
6	Julius Ogwang	Uganda	3:43.57	
7	Julius Achon	Uganda	3:45.40	
8	Bonaventure Niyonizigiye	Burundi	3:45.73	
9	Mahmud Aden Ibrahim	Somalia	3:46.67	
10	Lambert Ndayikeza	Burundi	3:47.53	
11	Paskar Owor	Uganda	3:53.33	
	Sammy Mutai	Kenya	DNF	
