= Athletics at the 1999 All-Africa Games – Women's 1500 metres =

Athletics at the 1999 All-Africa Games
Track events
100 m	men	women
200 m	men	women
400 m	men	women
800 m	men	women
1500 m	men	women
5000 m	men	women
10,000 m	men	women
100 m hurdles		women
110 m hurdles	men
400 m hurdles	men	women
3000 m steeplechase	men
4×100 m relay	men	women
4×400 m relay	men	women
Road events
Marathon	men	women
10 km walk		women
20 km walk	men
Field events
High jump	men	women
Pole vault	men	women
Long jump	men	women
Triple jump	men	women
Shot put	men	women
Discus throw	men	women
Hammer throw	men	women
Javelin throw	men	women
Combined events
Heptathlon		women
Decathlon	men

The women's 1500 metres event at the 1999 All-Africa Games was held 15–16 September at the Johannesburg Stadium.

== Medalists ==
Gold	Silver	Bronze
Kutre Dulecha; Ethiopia	Nouria Mérah-Benida; Algeria	Jackline Maranga; Kenya

== Results ==
=== Heats ===
Qualification: First 4 of each heat (Q) and the next 4 fastest (q) qualified for the final.

Rank	Heat	Name	Nationality	Time	Notes
1	1	Kutre Dulecha	Ethiopia	4:26.38	Q
2	1	Etaferahu Tarekegne	Ethiopia	4:28.00	Q
3	1	Jeruto Kiptum	Kenya	4:28.02	Q
4	1	Nouria Mérah-Benida	Algeria	4:28.12	Q
5	2	Genet Gebregiorgis	Ethiopia	4:32.65	Q
6	2	Jackline Maranga	Kenya	4:33.16	Q
7	2	Julia Sakara	Zimbabwe	4:33.76	Q
8	1	Fatma Lanouar	Tunisia	4:34.09	q
9	2	Florence Djepe	Cameroon	4:34.23	Q
10	2	Catherine Maapela	South Africa	4:34.62	q
11	2	Léontine Tsiba	Republic of the Congo	4:35.24	q
12	1	Zanelle Grobler	South Africa	4:35.44	q
13	1	Victoria Moradeyo	Nigeria	4:38.37	
14	1	Addeh Mwamba	Zambia	4:38.48	
15	2	Abibaku Yakubu	Nigeria	4:39.83	
16	2	Spéciose Gakobwa	Burundi	4:42.22	
17	1	Catherine Webombesa	Uganda	4:44.84	
18	1	Josiane Abougone	Gabon	4:51.69	
19	2	Yango Mbololia Tikala	Democratic Republic of the Congo	5:40.40	
	1	Lwiza John	Tanzania	DNS	
	2	Agnes Chikwakwa	Malawi	DNS	
	2	Maria Mutola	Mozambique	DNS	

=== Final ===
Rank	Name	Nationality	Time	Notes
1st place, gold medalist(s)	Kutre Dulecha	Ethiopia	4:18.33	
2nd place, silver medalist(s)	Nouria Mérah-Benida	Algeria	4:18.69	
3rd place, bronze medalist(s)	Jackline Maranga	Kenya	4:19.31	
4	Genet Gebregiorgis	Ethiopia	4:21.08	
5	Jeruto Kiptum	Kenya	4:24.80	
6	Etaferahu Tarekegne	Ethiopia	4:25.24	
7	Léontine Tsiba	Republic of the Congo	4:26.74	
8	Florence Djepe	Cameroon	4:26.83	
9	Julia Sakara	Zimbabwe	4:29.00	
10	Catherine Maapela	South Africa	4:30.29	
11	Zanelle Grobler	South Africa	4:35.29	
12	Fatma Lanouar	Tunisia	4:43.11	
