= Athletics at the 1999 All-Africa Games – Men's marathon =

Athletics at the 1999 All-Africa Games
Track events
| 100 m | men | women |
| 200 m | men | women |
| 400 m | men | women |
| 800 m | men | women |
| 1500 m | men | women |
| 5000 m | men | women |
| 10,000 m | men | women |
| 100 m hurdles | | women |
| 110 m hurdles | men |
| 400 m hurdles | men | women |
| 3000 m steeplechase | men |
| 4×100 m relay | men | women |
| 4×400 m relay | men | women |
Road events
| Marathon | men | women |
| 10 km walk | | women |
| 20 km walk | men |
Field events
| High jump | men | women |
| Pole vault | men | women |
| Long jump | men | women |
| Triple jump | men | women |
| Shot put | men | women |
| Discus throw | men | women |
| Hammer throw | men | women |
| Javelin throw | men | women |
Combined events
| Heptathlon | | women |
| Decathlon | men |

The men's marathon event at the 1999 All-Africa Games was held in the streets of Johannesburg.

== Results ==
| Rank | Name | Nationality | Time | Notes |
|---|---|---|---|---|
| 1st place, gold medalist(s) | Joshua Peterson | South Africa | 2:19:07 | |
| 2nd place, silver medalist(s) | Fokasi Wilbrod Fullah | Tanzania | 2:20:47 | |
| 3rd place, bronze medalist(s) | Frank Pooe | South Africa | 2:23:36 | |
| 4 | Thabiso Moqhali | Lesotho | 2:24:20 | |
| 5 | Khauta Ntsoele | Lesotho | 2:25:42 | |
| 6 | Turube Bedaso | Ethiopia | 2:26:22 | |
| 7 | Tiyapo Maso | Botswana | 2:26:27 | |
| 8 | Bruce Lati | Kenya | 2:26:33 | |
| 9 | Luketz Swartbooi | Namibia | 2:26:53 | |
| 10 | Samuel Molokomme | South Africa | 2:28:10 | |
| 11 | Tesfaye Amenu | Ethiopia | 2:29:37 | |
| 12 | Khomojoo Kapane | Lesotho | 2:30:44 | |
| 13 | Fackson Nkandu | Zambia | 2:31:36 | |
| 14 | Honest Mutsakani | Zimbabwe | 2:31:55 | |
| 15 | John Mwathiwa | Malawi | 2:34:44 | |
| 16 | Tesfit Berhe | Eritrea | 2:35:42 | |
| 17 | Gabriel Mazimpaka | Rwanda | 2:36:18 | |
| 18 | Ernest Ndjissipou | Central African Republic | 2:40:15 | |
| 19 | Younes Benammar | Libya | 2:42:38 | |
| 20 | Aron Adem | Eritrea | 2:43:18 | |
| 21 | Alex Malinga | Uganda | 2:44:04 | |
| 22 | Patrick Ishyaka | Rwanda | 2:45:47 | |
| 23 | Mayita Yav | Democratic Republic of the Congo | 2:49:22 | |
| 24 | Mesein Yohans | Eritrea | 2:58:43 | |
| | Ahmed Ahmed | Egypt | DNS | |
| | Tadesse Hailemariam | Ethiopia | DNS | |
| | Claude Dikomba | Gabon | DNS | |
| | Julius Kimutai | Kenya | DNS | |
| | Kopamo Pekile | Lesotho | DNS | |
| | Percy Sephoda | Lesotho | DNS | |
| | Rodwell Kamwendo | Malawi | DNS | |
| | Francis Sitima | Malawi | DNS | |
| | John Nada Saya | Tanzania | DNS | |
| | Tendai Chimusasa | Zimbabwe | DNS | |
