= Idiata =

Idiata is a surname. Notable people with the surname include:

- Anthony Idiata (born 1975), Nigerian high jumper
- Samson Idiata (born 1988), Nigerian high jumper and long jumper
