= Saidat Onanuga =

Nigerian former track and field sprinter (born 1974)

Personal information
- Born: 18 June 1974 (age 52)

Sport
- Sport: Track and field
Medal record
Representing Nigeria
African Championships
Gold medal – first place	1996 Yaoundé	400 m
Gold medal – first place	1996 Yaoundé	400 m hurdles
Gold medal – first place	1996 Yaoundé	4×400 m
Bronze medal – third place	1998 Dakar	400 m hurdles

Saidat Onanuga (born 18 June 1974) is a Nigerian former track and field sprinter who specialised in the 400 metres. She also competed in the 400 metres hurdles. She represented Nigeria at the World Championships in Athletics in 1997, competing as a relay alternate.

Onanuga began her career in the 800 metres, winning Nigerian national titles in 1990 and 1991 before moving into the 400 m sprint and hurdles. An appearance at the 1992 World Junior Championships in Athletics came soon afterwards.

She established herself as a senior at the 1996 African Championships in Athletics, where she was the gold medallist in both the 400 m and 400 m hurdles. She claimed her third gold of the tournament in the 4 × 400 metres relay. This proved to be the peak of her career individually, although she did won hurdles bronze medals and relay gold at both the 1998 African Championships in Athletics and the 1999 All-Africa Games.

Onanuga competed in American collegiate competitions for the UTEP Miners. The competitions of the Nigerian University Games Association allowed Onanuga's sporting talent to be identified and led to her recruitment by an American college – a growing phenomenon during that period.

== International competitions ==
Year	Competition	Venue	Position	Event	Notes
1992	World Junior Championships	Seoul, South Korea	5th (heats)	400 m	55.61
1996	African Championships	Yaoundé, Cameroon	1st	400 m	52.85
1996	African Championships	Yaoundé, Cameroon	1st	400 m hurdles	56.64
1996	African Championships	Yaoundé, Cameroon	1st	4 × 400 m	3:39.20
1997	World Championships	Athens, Greece	7th (heats)	4 × 400 m	3:27.94
1998	African Championships	Dakar, Senegal	3rd	400 m hurdles	56.84
1998	African Championships	Dakar, Senegal	1st	4 × 400 m	3:31.07
1999	All-Africa Games	Johannesburg, South Africa	3rd	400 m hurdles	58.34
1999	All-Africa Games	Johannesburg, South Africa	1st	4 × 400 m	3:29.22

== National titles ==
- Nigerian Athletics Championships
  - 800 metres: 1990, 1991
  - 400 metres hurdles: 1993, 1999
