= Joanna Hoareau =

Seychellois athlete

Personal information
- Nationality: Seychellois
- Born: 19 January 1979 (age 46)
- Height: 1.60 m (5 ft 3 in)
- Weight: 54 kg (119 lb)

Sport
- Sport: Track and field
- Event: Sprints

Joanna Hoareau (born 19 January 1979) is a Seychellois former sprinter and long jumper.

Representing Seychelles at the 1999 All-Africa Games, Joanna competed in the women's 100 metres, 200 metres and long jump. Although she failed to win a medal in any of these events, she was selected to take part in the Sydney Olympics the following year, running in the women's 100 metres: Hoareau finished sixth in heat seven of the qualifications with a time of 12.01 seconds and did not progress to the semi-finals.

Hoareau is the current national record holder in the women's 200 metres and 4 × 400 metres relay.
