= Grace Umelo =

Nigerian long jumper

Medal record

Women's athletics

Representing Nigeria

African Championships
Gold medal – first place	1996 Yaoundé	Long jump

Grace Umelo (born 10 July 1978) is a Nigerian retired athlete who specialised in the long jump. She won several medals at regional level.

Her personal best in the event is 6.60 metres set in Lagos in 1999.

== Competition record ==
Year	Competition	Venue	Position	Event	Notes
Representing Nigeria
1996	African Championships	Yaoundé, Cameroon	1st	Long jump	6.13 m
1997	African Junior Championships	Ibadan, Nigeria	1st	Long jump	6.25 m
1999	All-Africa Games	Johannesburg, South Africa	1st	Long jump	6.60 m
2003	All-Africa Games	Abuja, Nigeria	2nd	Long jump	6.56 m
2003	Afro-Asian Games	Hyderabad, India	6th	Long jump	6.14 m
