= Maher Ridane =

Tunisian javelin thrower

Personal information
- Nationality: Tunisian
- Born: 11 October 1971 (age 54) Tunisia
- Height: 177 cm (5 ft 10 in)
- Weight: 90 kg (198 lb)

Sport
- Country: Tunisia
- Sport: Javelin throw

Achievements and titles
- Personal best: 77.98
Medal record
Men's athletics
Representing Tunisia
African Championships
| Gold medal – first place | 2000 Algiers | Javelin throw |
| Bronze medal – third place | 1996 Yaoundé | Javelin throw |

Maher Ridane is a Tunisian Olympic javelin thrower. He represented his country in the men's javelin throw at the 2000 Summer Olympics. His distance was a 70.35 in the qualifiers.

He also represented Tunisia in the 1999 All-Africa Games, winning a bronze medal with a 72.18 score.
