= Julius Gitahi =

Kenyan long-distance runner

Julius Gitahi (born 29 April 1978 in Nyeri, Central Province) is a Kenyan long-distance runner.

== International competitions ==
Representing Kenya
| Year | Competition | Venue | Position | Event | Notes |
|---|---|---|---|---|---|
| 1998 | Goodwill Games | Uniondale, United States | 1st | 10,000 m | 27:49.26 |
| 1999 | All-Africa Games | Johannesburg, South Africa | 1st | 5000 m | 13:49.06 |
| 2000 | Olympic Games | Sydney, Australia | 9th | 5000 m | 13:39.11 |
| 2007 | Hokkaido Marathon | Sapporo, Japan | 1st | Marathon | 2:17:26 |
