= Liezl Roux =

South African javelin thrower

Medal record

Women's athletics

Representing South Africa

African Championships
| Gold medal – first place | 1993 Durban | Javelin throw |
| Silver medal – second place | 1992 Belle Vue Harel | Javelin throw |

Liezel Roux (born 25 May 1967) is a retired South African javelin thrower.

She won the silver medal at the 1992 African Championships, the gold medal at the 1993 African Championships, and the gold medal at the 1999 All-Africa Games.

Her personal best throw is 50.62 metres, achieved in March 2000 in Cape Town.
