= Grace Birungi =

Ugandan runner (born 1973)

Medal record

Women's athletics

Representing Uganda

African Championships
Silver medal – second place	1996 Yaoundé	400 m

Grace Birungi (born 10 October 1973) is an Ugandan runner who specialized in the 800 metres and to a lesser extent 400 metres.

She won a silver medal in 400 m at the 1996 African Championships in Yaoundé and a bronze medal in 800 m at the 1999 All-Africa Games in Johannesburg. Participating in the 2000 Summer Olympics, she achieved fifth place in her 800 m heat, thus failing to make it through to the second round.
