= Mark Anthony Awere =

Ghanaian long jumper (born 1971)

Medal record

Men's athletics

Representing Ghana

African Championships
Bronze medal – third place	1998 Dakar	Long jump

Mark Anthony Awere (born 16 July 1971) is a Ghanaian long jumper.

He won bronze medals at the 1998 African Championships and the 1999 All-Africa Games. He also competed at the 2000 Olympic Games.

His personal best jump is 8.04 metres, achieved in June 1999 in Bad Langensalza.

In 2003, Awere tested positive for doping in Mulhouse. He was banned for three months.
