= Hiywot Gizaw =

Ethiopian marathon runner

Hiywot Gizaw (born 1978 or 1979) is a former Ethiopian marathon runner.

She won the women's marathon event at the 1999 All-Africa Games in 2:45:38 h.
