= Kehinde Aladefa =

Nigerian track and field athlete

Kehinde Phillip “Kenny” Aladefa (born 19 December 1974) is a Nigerian track and field athlete who competed in 400 metres hurdles at the 1996 Summer Olympics and won a silver and bronze medal at the All-Africa Games in 1995 and 1999.

Personal best: 110 meter hurdles - 13.58 seconds, personal best: 400 meter hurdles - 49.60 seconds.

He graduated from the University of Southern California with a degree in biological sciences. He competed in grand prix races. He then attended St. Matthew's University School of Medicine in the Cayman Islands and graduated in 2005 with a degree in Doctor of Medicine.
