= Amarildo Almeida =

Guinea-Bissauan sprinter (born 1976)

Amarildo Almeida (born 15 March 1976) is a Guinea-Bissauan sprinter. Almedia competed at the 1996 Summer Olympics in the men's 100 metres. He also competed at the 1999 World Championships in Athletics in the 100-metre dash.
