= Danny Beauchamp =

Seychellois track and field athlete

Personal information
- Nationality: Seychellois
- Born: 16 April 1969
- Died: 12 November 2010 (aged 41) North East Point, Seychelles
- Height: 1.74 m (5 ft 8 1/2 in)
- Weight: 70 kg (150 lb)

Sport
- Sport: Track and field
- Events: Long jump High jump
Medal record
Men's athletics
Representing Seychelles
African Championships
Bronze medal – third place	1992 Belle Vue Harel	Long jump

Daniel Gerard Beauchamp (16 April 1969 – 12 November 2010) was a Seychellois track and field athlete who represented his country at international level in several disciplines.

Danny went into the 1992 Summer Olympics having just set the national record in the long jump with a distance of 7.86 metres. He competed in both the high jump and the long jump at the Games but failed to progress to the finals in either event. Beauchamp continued to represent his country in the long jump at both the 1994 and 1998 Commonwealth Games. At the latter tournament, he finished in fourteenth place with a leap of 7.36 metres and during that same year he was a member of the 4 × 100 metres squad which broke the national record with a time of 41.05 seconds. At a more regional level, Danny won gold medals for Seychelles in the long jump at the 1993 and 1998 Indian Ocean Island Games.

On 4 July 2004, Beauchamp's athletics career ended when he was involved in a road accident which rendered him paraplegic, and although he made every effort to overcome his disability, he was never able to walk again. Danny died in a nursing home on 12 November 2010 and his death was mourned by the nation. The Seychellois President, James Michel, said "Danny Beauchamp was one of our best athletes. He made Seychelles proud in various national and international competitions, and he will be missed by us all".
