= Anthony Idiata =

Nigerian high jumper

Personal information
- Born: 5 January 1975 (age 51)

Sport
- Sport: Track and field
Medal record
Representing Nigeria
African Championships
| Silver medal – second place | 1996 Yaoundé | High jump |
African Games
| Gold medal – first place | 1999 Johannesburg | High jump |
| Silver medal – second place | 1995 Harare | High jump |

Anthony Idiata (born 5 January 1975) is a Nigerian high jumper.

He holds the African indoor record in high jump with 2.32 metres, achieved in February 2000 in Patras.

== Achievements ==
- 1999 All-Africa Games - gold medal - 2.27 metres, personal best
- 1997 West African Championships - gold medal
- 1996 African Championships - silver medal
- 1995 All-Africa Games - silver medal
