= Téko Folligan =

Togolese sprinter (born 1976)

Personal information
- Nationality: Togolese
- Born: 6 April 1976 (age 50)

Sport
- Sport: Sprinting
- Event: 4 × 100 metres relay

Téko Georges Folligan (born 6 April 1976) is a Togolese former sprinter. He competed in the men's 4 × 100 metres relay at the 1996 Summer Olympics.
