= Julius Chepkwony =

Kenyan sprinter

Personal information
- Nationality: Kenyan
- Born: 6 June 1969 (age 56)

Sport
- Sport: Sprinting
- Event: 4 × 400 metres relay

Julius Chepkwony (born 6 June 1969) is a Kenyan sprinter. He competed in the 4 × 400 metres relay at the 1996 Summer Olympics and the 2000 Summer Olympics.
