= Pascal Dangbo =

Beninese sprinter

Personal information
- Nationality: Beninese
- Born: April 13, 1972 (age 53) Ouidah, Benin
- Height: 1.79 m (5 ft 10 1/2 in)
- Weight: 80 kg (176 lb)

Sport
- Country: Benin
- Sport: Athletics
- Event(s): 100 metres, 200 metres, 4 × 100 metres relay

Pascal Dangbo (born April 13, 1972) is a Beninese sprinter who took part in the 1992, 1996 and 2000 Summer Olympics.
