= Hillary Maritim =

Kenyan hurdler (born 1973)

Personal information
- Nationality: Kenyan
- Born: 5 February 1973 (age 52)

Sport
- Sport: Track and field
- Event: 400 metres hurdles

Hillary Maritim (born 5 February 1973) is a Kenyan hurdler. He competed in the men's 400 metres hurdles at the 2000 Summer Olympics.
