= List of African Games records in athletics =

The All-Africa Games is a multi-sport event which began in 1965. Athletics has been one of the sports held at the Games since the inaugural edition. Records set by athletes who are representing one of the Association of National Olympic Committees of Africa's member states.

== Men's records ==
Event	Record	Athlete	Nationality	Date	Games	Place	Ref.
100 m	9.95	Deji Aliu	Nigeria	12 October 2003	2003 Games	Abuja, Nigeria	
200 m	20.06 A	Francis Obikwelu	Nigeria	18 September 1999	1999 Games	Johannesburg, South Africa	
400 m	44.23 A	Innocent Egbunike	Nigeria	9 August 1987	1987 Games	Nairobi, Kenya	
800 m	1:44.91	Japheth Kimutai	Kenya	16 September 1999	1999 Games	Johannesburg, South Africa	
1500 m	3:34.1 h	Kip Keino	Kenya	July 1965	1965 Games	Brazzaville, Republic of Congo	
5000 m	13:12.51	Moses Kipsiro	Uganda	22 July 2007	2007 Games	Algiers, Algeria	
10,000 m	27:00.30	Zersenay Tadese	Eritrea	19 July 2007	2007 Games	Algiers, Algeria	
Half marathon	1:01:42	Titus Ekiru	Kenya	30 August 2019	2019 Games	Rabat, Morocco	
Marathon	2:14:47 A	Belayneh Dinsamo	Ethiopia	August 1987	1987 Games	Nairobi, Kenya	
110 m hurdles	13.32 (+0.5 m/s)	Antonio Alkana	South Africa	14 September 2015	2015 Games	Brazzaville, Republic of the Congo	
400 m hurdles	48.03 A	Amadou Dia Bâ	Senegal	9 August 1987	1987 Games	Nairobi, Kenya	
3000 m steeplechase	8:12.27	Ezekiel Kemboi	Kenya	13 October 2003	2003 Games	Abuja, Nigeria	
High jump	2.27 m	Kabelo Kgosiemang	Botswana	22 July 2007	2007 Games	Algiers, Algeria	
High jump	2.27 m A	Anthony Idiata	Nigeria	18 September 1999	1999 Games	Johannesburg, South Africa	
Pole vault	5.50 m	Okkert Brits	South Africa	August 1995	1995 Games	Harare, Zimbabwe	
Long jump	8.23 m A	Paul Emordi	Nigeria	12 August 1987	1987 Games	Nairobi, Kenya	
Triple jump	17.12 m A	Francis Dodoo	Ghana	8 August 1987	1987 Games	Nairobi, Kenya	
Shot put	21.48 m	Chukwuebuka Enekwechi	Nigeria	27 August 2019	2019 Games	Rabat, Morocco	
Discus throw	63.61 m	Omar Ahmed El Ghazali	Egypt	13 October 2003	2003 Games	Abuja, Nigeria	
Hammer throw	76.73 m	Chris Harmse	South Africa	22 July 2007	2007 Games	Algiers, Algeria	
Javelin throw	87.73 m	Julius Yego	Kenya	30 August 2019	2019 Games	Rabat, Morocco	
Decathlon	7985 pts	Jangy Addy	Liberia	11–12 September 2011	2011 Games	Maputo, Mozambique	
Decathlon	100m (wind) / Long jump (wind) / Shot put / High jump / 400m / 110m H (wind) / Discus / Pole vault / Javelin / 1500m; 10.61 / 7.76 m (−0.5 m/s) / 15.38 m / 1.92 m / 48.75 / 14.15 / 48.14 m / 4.40 m / 50.71 m / 5:08.88						
20 km walk (road)	1:22:33	Hatem Ghoula	Tunisia	19 July 2007	2007 Games	Algiers, Algeria	
4 × 100 m relay	38.30	Sean Safo-Antwi; Benjamin Azamati-Kwaku; Martin Owusu-Antwi; Joseph Amoah	Ghana	28 August 2019	2019 Games	Rabat, Morocco	
4 × 400 m relay	2:59.12	Patrick Nyambe; Kennedy Luchembe; David Mulenga; Muzala Samukonga	Zambia	22 March 2024	2023 Games	Accra, Ghana	

== Women's records ==
Event	Record	Athlete	Nationality	Date	Games	Place	Ref.
100 m	11.02 (+0.6 m/s)	Marie-Josée Ta Lou	Ivory Coast	14 September 2015	2015 Games	Brazzaville, Republic of the Congo	
200 m	22.45 A (+0.1 m/s)	Fatima Yusuf	Nigeria	18 September 1999	1999 Games	Johannesburg, South Africa	
400 m	49.43	Fatima Yusuf	Nigeria	15 September 1995	1995 Games	Harare, Zimbabwe	
800 m	1:56.99 A	Maria de Lurdes Mutola	Mozambique	18 September 1995	1995 Games	Harare, Zimbabwe	
1500 m	4:05.71	Hirut Meshesha	Ethiopia	22 March 2024	2023 Games	Accra, Ghana	
3000 m	8:49.33	Susan Sirma	Kenya	September 1991	1991 Games	Cairo, Egypt	
5000 m	15:02.72	Meseret Defar	Ethiopia	18 July 2007	2007 Games	Algiers, Algeria	
10,000 m	31:24.18	Alice Aprot	Kenya	16 September 2015	2015 Games	Brazzaville, Republic of the Congo	
Half marathon	1:10:26	Yalemzerf Yehualaw	Ethiopia	30 August 2019	2019 Games	Rabat, Morocco	
Marathon	2:45:38 A	Hiywot Gizaw	Ethiopia	19 September 1999	1999 Games	Johannesburg, South Africa	
100 m hurdles	12.68 (−0.6 m/s)	Tobi Amusan	Nigeria	28 August 2019	2019 Games	Rabat, Morocco	
400 m hurdles	54.93	Muna Jabir Adam	Sudan	22 July 2007	2007 Games	Algiers, Algeria	
3000 m steeplechase	9:15.61	Beatrice Chepkoech	Kenya	20 March 2024	2023 Games	Accra, Ghana	
High jump	1.96 m A	Hestrie Cloete	South Africa	15 September 1999	1999 Games	Johannesburg, South Africa	
Pole vault	4.35 m	Miré Reinstorf	South Africa	19 March 2024	2023 Games	Accra, Ghana	
Long jump	6.79 m	Janice Josephs	South Africa	21 July 2007	2007 Games	Algiers, Algeria	
Triple jump	14.70 m A	Françoise Mbango Etone	Cameroon	18 September 1999	1999 Games	Johannesburg, South Africa	
Shot put	18.12 m	Vivian Chukwuemeka	Nigeria	11 October 2003	2003 Games	Abuja, Nigeria	
Discus throw	59.91 m	Chioma Onyekwere	Nigeria	29 August 2019	2019 Games	Rabat, Morocco	
Hammer throw	69.65 m	Zahra Tatar	Algeria	19 March 2024	2023 Games	Accra, Ghana	
Javelin throw	60.80 m	Jo-Ane van Dyk	South Africa	20 March 2024	2023 Games	Accra, Ghana	
Heptathlon	6278 pts	Margaret Simpson	Ghana	20–21 July 2007	2007 Games	Algiers, Algeria	
Heptathlon	100m H (wind) / High jump / Shot put / 200m (wind) / Long jump (wind) / Javelin / 800m; 13.54 (−0.5 m/s) / 1.81 m / 12.81 m / 24.38 (NWI) / 6.11 m (NWI) / 53.33 m / 2:21.57						
10 km walk (road)	49:33 A	Susan Vermeulen	South Africa	September 1999	1999 Games	Johannesburg, South Africa	
20 km walk (road)	1:34:41	Emily Ngii	Kenya	28 August 2019	2019 Games	Rabat, Morocco	
4 × 100 m relay	43.04	Emem Edem; Endurance Ojokolo; Chinedu Odozor; Mary Onyali-Omagbemi	Nigeria	15 October 2003	2003 Games	Abuja, Nigeria	
4 × 400 m relay	3:27.08 A	Maria Usifo; Airat Bakare; Falilat Ogunkoya; Mary Onyali-Omagbemi	Nigeria	12 August 1987	1987 Games	Nairobi, Kenya	

== Mixed records ==
Event	Record	Athlete	Nationality	Date	Games	Place	Ref.
4 × 400 m relay	3:13.26	Ifeanyi Emmanuel Ojeli; Patience Okon George; Sikiru Adeyemi; Omolara Ogunmakinju	Nigeria	19 March 2024	2023 Games	Accra, Ghana	
