= Athletics at the 1999 All-Africa Games =

Athletics at the VII All-Africa Games
- Dates: 14–18 September
- Host city: Johannesburg, South Africa
- Venue: Johannesburg Stadium
- Participation: 45 nations

The seventh All-Africa Games were held in September 1999 in Johannesburg, South Africa. As the track is at an altitude of 1748 metres all performances are considered to be set at altitude, this is believed to assist events up to 400 metres and in the long jump and triple jump. However, for events beyond 800 metres the thinner air is believed to have a detrimental effect on performances.

Maria de Lurdes Mutola of Mozambique won her third 800 metres title in a row. Nigeria won all four relay races; 4 × 100 metres and 4 × 400 metres for men and women. South African athletes won all four throwing events for men.

Some new women's events were added: pole vault, hammer throw and 10 kilometres road walk.

== Medal summary ==
=== Men's events ===
Event	Gold		Silver		Bronze	
100 metres	Leonard Myles-Mills; Ghana	9.99 GR	Francis Obikwelu; Nigeria	10.01	Frankie Fredericks; Namibia	10.10
200 metres	Francis Obikwelu; Nigeria	20.06 GR	Joseph Batangdon; Cameroon	20.37	Daniel Effiong; Nigeria	20.49
400 metres	Kennedy Ochieng; Kenya	44.77	Clement Chukwu; Nigeria	45.31	Phillip Mukomana; Zimbabwe	45.43
800 metres	Japheth Kimutai; Kenya	1:44.91 GR	Djabir Saïd-Guerni; Algeria	1:45.32	Hezekiél Sepeng; South Africa	1:45.58
1500 metres	Hailu Mekonnen; Ethiopia	3:39.73	David Lelei; Kenya	3:40.46	Fred Cheruiyot; Kenya	3:41.21
5000 metres	Julius Gitahi; Kenya	13:49.06	Fita Bayissa; Ethiopia	13:49.79	Tom Nyariki; Kenya	13:50.40
10,000 metres	Assefa Mezgebu; Ethiopia	28:12.15	David Chelule; Kenya	28:13.71	Habte Jifar; Ethiopia	28:15.11
Marathon	Joshua Peterson; South Africa	2:19:07	Focus Wolbroad; Tanzania	2:20:47	Frank Pooe; South Africa	2:23:36
3000 metres steeplechase	Kipkurui Misoi; Kenya	8:32.42	Wilson Boit Kipketer; Kenya	8:41.33	Christopher Kosgei; Kenya	8:41.35
110 metres hurdles	William Erese; Nigeria	13.71 GR	Joseph-Berlioz Randriamihaja; Madagascar	13.85	Kehinde Aladefa; Nigeria	13.86
400 metres hurdles	Ibou Faye; Senegal	48.30	Ken Harnden; Zimbabwe	48.47	Erick Keter; Kenya	49.17
4 × 100 metres relay	Nigeria; Deji Aliu; Daniel Effiong; Chinedu Oriala; Innocent Asonze	38.56 GR	South Africa; Morne Nagel; Marcus La Grange; Lee-Roy Newton; Mathew Quinn	38.88	Ivory Coast	39.09
4 × 400 metres relay	Nigeria; Fidelis Gadzama; Jude Monye; Clement Chukwu; Sunday Bada	3:01.20	South Africa; Adriaan Botha; Hendrik Mokganyetsi; Hennie Botha; Arnaud Malherbe	3:01.34	Kenya; Kennedy Ochieng; Hillary Maritim; Matilu Abednego; Julius Chepkwony	3:01.73
20 kilometres walk	David Kimutai; Kenya	1:29:12	Moussa Aouanouk; Algeria	1:29:36	Vincent Asumang; Ghana	1:48:00
High jump	Anthony Idiata; Nigeria	2.27 GR	Abderrahmane Hammad; Algeria	2.24	Malcolm Hendriks; South Africa	2.24
Pole vault	Okkert Brits; South Africa	5.40	Mohamed Bédoui; Tunisia	4.80	none	
Long jump	Hatem Mersal; Egypt	8.09	Georges Téko Folligan; Togo	8.00	Mark Anthony Awere; Ghana	7.96
Triple jump	Andrew Owusu; Ghana	16.89	Remmy Limo; Kenya	16.84	Toussaint Rabenala; Madagascar	16.60
Shot put	Burger Lambrechts; South Africa	19.50 GR	Janus Robberts; South Africa	19.16	Karel Potgieter; South Africa	18.90
Discus throw	Frantz Kruger; South Africa	61.02	Frits Potgieter; South Africa	60.59	Mickael Conjungo; Central African Republic	57.09
Hammer throw	Chris Harmse; South Africa	74.75 GR	Samir Haouam; Algeria	65.80	Yamen Hussein Abdel Moneim; Egypt	65.25
Javelin throw	Marius Corbett; South Africa	78.74 GR	Johan Vosloo; South Africa	75.60	Maher Ridane; Tunisia	72.18
Decathlon	Anis Riahi; Tunisia	7497 GR	Rédouane Youcef; Algeria	7401	Patrick Legrand; Mauritius	6034

=== Women's events ===
Event	Gold		Silver		Bronze	
100 metres	Mercy Nku; Nigeria	11.03 GR	Myriam Léonie Mani; Cameroon	11.24	Endurance Ojokolo; Nigeria	11.25
200 metres	Fatima Yusuf; Nigeria	22.45 GR	Myriam Léonie Mani; Cameroon	22.91	Monica Twum; Ghana	22.98
400 metres	Falilat Ogunkoya; Nigeria	50.02	Olabisi Afolabi; Nigeria	50.34	Amy Mbacké Thiam; Senegal	50.95
800 metres	Maria Mutola; Mozambique	1:59.73 GR	Nouria Mérah-Benida; Algeria	2:00.83	Grace Birungi; Uganda	2:01.76
1500 metres	Kutre Dulecha; Ethiopia	4:18.33	Nouria Mérah-Benida; Algeria	4:18.69	Jackline Maranga; Kenya	4:19.31
5000 metres	Ayelech Worku; Ethiopia	15:38.22	Elana Meyer; South Africa	15:42.76	Vivian Cheruiyot; Kenya	15:42.79
10,000 metres	Gete Wami; Ethiopia	32:08.15	Merima Hashim; Ethiopia	32:16.24	Leah Malot; Kenya	32:36.02
Marathon	Hiywot Gizwa; Ethiopia	2:45:38 GR	Meseret Kotu; Ethiopia	2:46:29	Kore Alemu; Ethiopia	2:48:31
100 metres hurdles	Glory Alozie; Nigeria	12.74 GR	Angela Atede; Nigeria	12.99	Mame Tacko Diouf; Senegal	13.02
400 metres hurdles	Mame Tacko Diouf; Senegal	55.69	Surita Febbraio; South Africa	57.11	Saidat Onanuga; Nigeria	58.34
4 × 100 metres relay	Nigeria ? Endurance Ojokolo ? ?	43.28	Madagascar	43.98	Ghana; Mavis Akoto; Monica Twum; Helena Amoako; Dora Manu	44.21
4 × 400 metres relay	Nigeria; Saidat Onanuga; Fatima Yusuf; Olabisi Afolabi; Falilat Ogunkoya	3:29.22	Senegal	3:31.63	Cameroon	3:33.28
10 kilometres walk	Susan Vermeulen; South Africa	49:33 GR	Nagwa Ibrahim Ali; Egypt	50:19	Bahia Boussad; Algeria	51:31
High jump	Hestrie Cloete; South Africa	1.96 GR	Irène Tiendrébéogo; Burkina Faso	1.85	Philippa Erasmus; South Africa	1.80
Pole vault	Rika Erasmus; South Africa	3.60	Elmarie Gerryts; South Africa	3.60	none	
Long jump	Grace Umelo; Nigeria	6.60	Françoise Mbango Etone; Cameroon	6.55 (NR)	Charlene Lawrence; South Africa	6.50
Triple jump	Françoise Mbango Etone; Cameroon	14.70 GR	Baya Rahouli; Algeria	14.64	Kéné Ndoye; Senegal	13.86
Shot put	Vivian Peters; Nigeria	16.72	Veronica Abrahamse; South Africa	16.53	Maranelle du Toit; South Africa	16.45
Discus throw	Monia Kari; Tunisia	57.22	Lezelle Duvenage; South Africa	54.55	Elizna Naudé; South Africa	53.26
Hammer throw	Caroline Fournier; Mauritius	58.83	Elmarie Knoetzen; South Africa	58.74	Marwa Ahmed Hussein; Egypt	55.25
Javelin throw	Liezl Roux; South Africa	49.38	Aïda Sellam; Tunisia	48.91	Sorochukwu Ihuefo; Nigeria	48.24
Heptathlon	Maralize Fouché (Visser); South Africa	5631	Patience Itanyi; Nigeria	5565	Oluchi Elechi; Nigeria	5537

== Medal table ==
Rank	Nation	Gold	Silver	Bronze	Total
1	Nigeria (NGR)	13	5	6	24
2	South Africa (SAF)	11	11	8	30
3	Ethiopia (ETH)	6	3	2	11
4	Kenya (KEN)	5	4	8	17
5	Tunisia (TUN)	2	2	1	5
6	Senegal (SEN)	2	1	3	6
7	Ghana (GHA)	2	0	4	6
8	Cameroon (CMR)	1	4	1	6
9	Egypt (EGY)	1	1	2	4
10	Mauritius (MRI)	1	0	1	2
11	Mozambique (MOZ)	1	0	0	1
12	Algeria (ALG)	0	8	1	9
13	Madagascar (MAD)	0	2	1	3
14	Zimbabwe (ZIM)	0	1	1	2
15	Burkina Faso (BUR)	0	1	0	1
15	Tanzania (TAN)	0	1	0	1
15	Togo (TOG)	0	1	0	1
18	Central African Republic (CAF)	0	0	1	1
18	Ivory Coast (CIV)	0	0	1	1
18	Namibia (NAM)	0	0	1	1
18	Uganda (UGA)	0	0	1	1
Totals (21 entries)		45	45	43	133

== Participating nations ==
- Algeria
- Angola
- Benin
- Botswana
- Burkina Faso
- Burundi
- Cape Verde
- Central African Republic
- Chad
- Comoros
- Democratic Republic of the Congo
- Egypt
- Equatorial Guinea
- Eritrea
- Ethiopia
- Gabon
- Ghana
- Guinea
- Guinea-Bissau
- Ivory Coast
- Kenya
- Lesotho
- Libya
- Madagascar
- Malawi
- Mali
- Mauritius
- Mozambique
- Namibia
- Niger
- Nigeria
- Republic of the Congo
- Rwanda
- São Tomé and Príncipe
- Senegal
- Seychelles
- Somalia
- South Africa
- Swaziland
- Tanzania
- Togo
- Tunisia
- Uganda
- Zambia
- Zimbabwe

== See also ==
- 1999 in athletics (track and field)
