= Johannesburg Stadium =

Stadium

Coordinates: 26°11′37.76″S 28°3′45.05″E

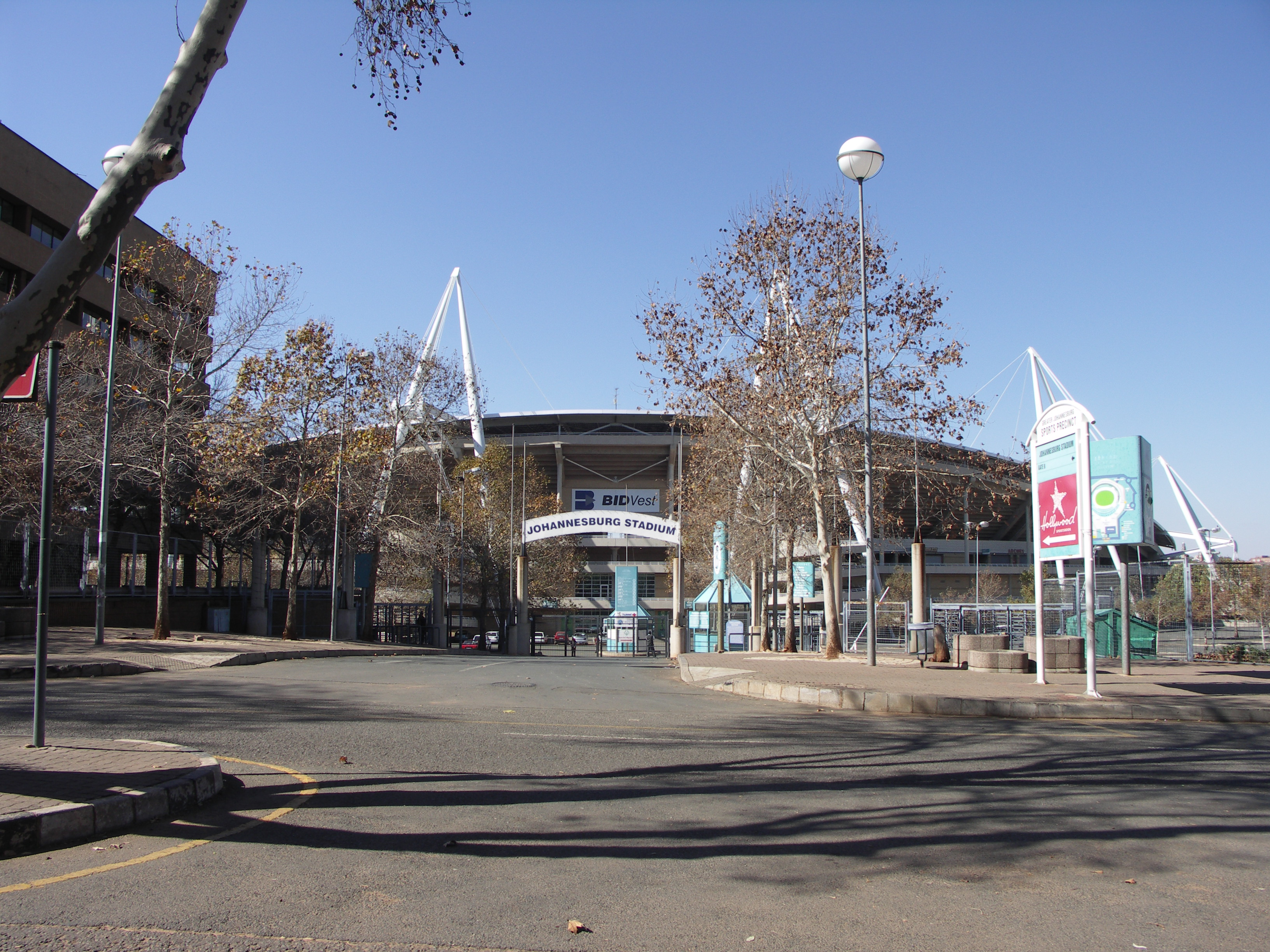
- Interactive map of Johannesburg Stadium
- Location: Doornfontein, Johannesburg
- Operator: Ellis Park Stadium (Pty) Ltd.
- Capacity: 37,500

Construction
- Opened: 1992

Tenants
- Orlando Pirates and Golden Lions training ground

Johannesburg Stadium is a stadium, in the Doornfontein suburb of Johannesburg, Gauteng Province, South Africa. The stadium has a sweeping roof and can accommodate 37,500 people.

It was originally built as an athletics stadium, but also hosted football and rugby matches.

The eighth IAAF World Cup in Athletics was held at the stadium in 1998. It served as the main stadium for the 1999 All-Africa Games.

It is mostly used as a training ground for the Orlando Pirates and the Golden Lions. Def Leppard concert in December 5th 1996

Michael Jackson performed two shows (sold out) on his HIStory World Tour, on 10 and 12 October 1997. Also he planned to give 2 concerts on 30 September and 2 October 1993, but these plans were suspended due to violence in Johannesburg.

Bon Jovi performed at the stadium during their These Days Tour on 1 December 1995.

Gloria Estefan performed at the stadium during her The Evolution Tour on 22 March 1997.

Tina Turner concluded the African leg of her Wildest Dreams Tour, with two consecutive shows, on 21–22 April 1996.

U2 finished their Popmart Tour at the stadium on 21 March 1998.

Kendrick Lamar also performed his South African leg of his international tour here on 8 February 2014.

== See also ==
- Ellis Park Stadium
