= 1999 All-Africa Games =

Multi-sport event in Johannesburg, South Africa

VII All-Africa Games
- Official logo of the Games
- Host city: Johannesburg, South Africa
- Nations: 53
- Events: 18 sports
- Opening: 10 September 1999
- Closing: 19 September 1999
- Opened by: Thabo Mbeki
- Main venue: FNB Stadium
- Website: AAG.org.za

The 7th All-Africa Games (Zulu: imiDlalo yesi-7 yase-Afrika; Afrikaans: 7de Afrika-Spele), also known as Johannesburg 1999 (Zulu: eGoli 1999), was a sport event held from 10 to 19 September 1999, in Greater Johannesburg, South Africa. 53 countries participated in eighteen sports. Netball was included as a demonstration sport.

The South Africans hosted about 25,000 visitors including 6,000 athletes and 3,000 officials from across the continent. The opening ceremony included dancing, African parables and Zulu warriors. Due to the size of the used props, the ceremony was staged in an arena with less than 15,000 spectators.

South Africa, which had lost its bid to Greece for the 2004 Olympic Games, was hoping to impress FIFA in the hope of landing the 2006 World Cup. It eventually got the 2010 edition. Overall the games were a success, with hosts South Africa outdistancing Nigeria and Egypt in the medals race.

Typical problems at the games included 600 children contracting food poisoning after being fed boxed lunches at the practice session for the Opening Ceremonies, striking laborers demonstrating outside games venues, displaying placards which read "No Wages, No All Africa Games." Women's field hockey was demoted to a non-medal event after the Nigerian team dropped out of the tournament. A melee at the finish of the basketball game between Angola and Egypt forced police to escort the Egyptian team from the court. Haile Gebrselassie, the world record holder in the 5,000 and 10,000 meters opted out of the games for health reasons, depriving the organizers of one of the biggest drawing cards of the games.

Despite the difficulties experienced, IOC President Juan Antonio Samaranch praised South Africa's organization of the Games, saying "this shows that you can organize big events."

Olympic stars Maria de Lurdes Mutola (athletics-800 m), Penny Heyns (swimming), Gete Wami (athletics, 10000 m) all starred in the women's events. South African pole vaulter Okkert Brits won his second African Games gold medal. Assefa Mezgebu of Ethiopia won the men's 10000 m.

Cameroon beat Zambia 4-3 on penalty kicks to win the football finale.

== Sports ==
- Athletics
- Baseball
- Basketball
- Boxing
- Cycling
- Football
- Gymnastics
- Handball
- Field hockey
- Judo
- Karate
- Swimming
- Table tennis
- Taekwondo
- Tennis
- Volleyball
- Weightlifting
- Wrestling
- demonstration sport: Netball ()

== Venues ==
- Ellis Park Stadium
- Ellis Park Aquatic Centre
- Ellis Park Tennis Centre
- Expo Auditorium
- Expo Centre Hall
- Expo Centre Rand Show Road
- Johannesburg Stadium
- Wits University Old Mutual Sports Hall
- Orlando Stadium
- Pimville Indoor Hall
- Rand Stadium
- Randburg Astro Stadium
- Randburg Indoor Sports Hall
- Randburg Precinct
- Vista University
- Wembly Indoor Hall

== Medal table ==
* Host nation (South Africa)

Rank	Nation	Gold	Silver	Bronze	Total
1	South Africa (SAF)*	71	64	49	184
2	Nigeria (NGR)	64	28	37	129
3	Egypt (EGY)	53	60	45	158
4	Tunisia (TUN)	20	20	23	63
5	Algeria (ALG)	14	24	32	70
6	Kenya (KEN)	10	10	20	40
7	Cameroon (CMR)	6	13	22	41
8	Senegal (SEN)	6	10	9	25
9	Ethiopia (ETH)	6	4	4	14
10	Lesotho (LES)	6	1	3	10
11	Madagascar (MAD)	4	3	7	14
12	Angola (ANG)	4	1	1	6
13	Ghana (GHA)	2	2	11	15
14	Ivory Coast (CIV)	2	1	5	8
15	Uganda (UGA)	2	1	3	6
16	Zimbabwe (ZIM)	1	10	13	24
17	Mauritius (MRI)	1	7	9	17
18	Gabon (GAB)	1	3	6	10
19	DR Congo (COD)	1	1	2	4
20	Mozambique (MOZ)	1	0	0	1
21	Botswana (BOT)	0	3	2	5
22	Seychelles (SEY)	0	1	6	7
23	Congo (CGO)	0	1	2	3
23	Niger (NIG)	0	1	2	3
25	Benin (BEN)	0	1	0	1
25	Tanzania (TAN)	0	1	0	1
25	Togo (TOG)	0	1	0	1
25	Zambia (ZAM)	0	1	0	1
29	Swaziland (SWZ)	0	0	4	4
30	Cape Verde (CPV)	0	0	2	2
30	Central African Republic (CAF)	0	0	2	2
30	Mali (MLI)	0	0	2	2
30	Namibia (NAM)	0	0	2	2
34	Guinea-Bissau (GBS)	0	0	1	1
34	Libya (LBA)	0	0	1	1
34	Malawi (MAW)	0	0	1	1
Totals (36 entries)		275	273	328	876

== Athletics ==
See Athletics at the 1999 All-Africa Games

Maria de Lurdes Mutola of Mozambique won her third 800 metres title in a row. Nigeria won all four relay races; 4×100 metres and 4×400 metres for men and women. South African athletes won all four throwing events for men.

Some new women's events were added: pole vault, hammer throw and 10 kilometres road walk.

== Field hockey ==
- Men: 1. South Africa, 2. Egypt, 3. Kenya, 4. Zimbabwe, 5. Ghana, 6. Malawi
- Women. 1. South Africa, 2. Zimbabwe, 3. Kenya, 4. Namibia

== Soccer ==
The soccer tournament was won by Cameroon, who became the second team to win this tournament twice.

Gold:	Silver:	Bronze:
Cameroon Coach:	Zambia Coach: Ben Bamfuchile	South Africa Coach:
