= 2014 African Championships in Athletics – Women's 20 kilometres walk =

The women's 20 kilometres walk event at the 2014 African Championships in Athletics was held on August 14 in Marrakesh, Morocco.

== Results ==
Rank	Name	Nationality	Time	Notes
1st place, gold medalist(s)	Grace Wanjiru	Kenya	1:37:04	
2nd place, silver medalist(s)	Emily Ngii	Kenya	1:38:12	
3rd place, bronze medalist(s)	Askale Tiksa	Ethiopia	1:40:05	NR
4	Chahinez Nasri	Tunisia	1:42:55	
5	Yehualeye Beletew	Ethiopia	1:47:33	
6	Cornelia Swart	South Africa	1:48:13	
7	Olfa Lafi	Tunisia	1:51:32	
8	Faustina Oguh	Nigeria	2:04:39	
9	Sarah Bouayadi	Morocco	2:05:36	
	Adanech Mengistu	Ethiopia	DNF	
	Zahira Ouazini	Morocco	DNF	
	Asnakech Araresa	Ethiopia	DNS	
