= 2015 Arab Athletics Championships =

19th Arab Athletics Championships
- Dates: 24–27 April 2015
- Host city: Isa Town, Bahrain
- Participation: ~700 athletes from 21 nations

The 2015 Arab Athletics Championships was the nineteenth edition of the international athletics competition between Arab countries that took place from 24–27 April 2015 at Khalifa Sports City Stadium in Isa Town, close to Manama, the capital of Bahrain. Around 700 athletes from 21 nations attended the event, which was directed by Bahrain's Bader Nasser. The event mascot was an anthropomorphic bird of prey.

A series of grand prix track and field meetings were organised by the Arab Athletics Federation in order to promote qualification for the event.

== Medal summary ==
=== Men ===
Event	Gold		Silver		Bronze	
100 metres (wind: +4.1 m/s)	Femi Ogunode (QAT)	10.04w	Barakat Al-Harthi (OMA)	10.05w	Aziz Ouhadi (MAR)	10.08w
200 metres (wind: +2.5 m/s)	Femi Ogunode (QAT)	20.52w	Barakat Al-Harthi (OMA)	20.66w	Yaqub Eid (BHR)	20.82w
400 metres	Abdelalelah Haroun (QAT)	44.68	Anas Beshr (EGY)	45.61	Abubakar Abbas (BHR)	46.19
800 metres	Musaeb Abdulrahman Balla (QAT)	1:46.74	Ali Al-Deraan (KSA)	1:47.03	Nader Belhanbel (MAR)	1:47.68
1500 metres	Fouad Elkaam (MAR)	3:46.54	Abdi Waiss Mouhyadin (DJI)	3:46.56	Youssouf Hiss Bachir (DJI)	3:47.08
5000 metres	Ayanleh Souleiman (DJI)	13:17.97	Albert Kibichii Rop (BHR)	13:18.55	Aweke Ayalew (BHR)	13:29.03
10,000 metres	El Hassan El-Abbassi (BHR)	28:23.11	Zelalem Bacha (BHR)	29:30.55	Ali Al-Wahshi (UAE)	33:18.50
110 metres hurdles (wind: +7.3 m/s)	Abdulaziz Al-Mandeel (KUW)	13.35w	Yaqoub Mohamed Al-Youha (KUW)	13.37w	Othmane Hadj Lazib (ALG)	13.74w
400 metres hurdles	Ali Khamis Khamis (BHR)	50.10	Saber Boukemouche (ALG)	50.31	Miloud Rahmani (ALG)	50.52
3000 metres steeplechase	Hamid Ezzine (MAR)	8:30.57	Brahim Taleb (MAR)	8:31.15	Amor Ben Yahia (TUN)	8:31.28
4×100 metres relay	Kuwait (KUW); Eisa Al-Youhah; Yaqoub Mohamed Al-Youha; Abdulaziz Al-Mandeel; Mishal Khalifa Al-Mutairi	39.75	Qatar (QAT); Femi Ogunode; Samuel Francis; Samuel Watson; Eid Abdulla Al-Kuwari	39.87	Iraq (IRQ); Hasanain Hasa Zubaiyen; Falah Abdulzahra; Mohamed; Mohammed Hassan Jumaah	40.44
4×400 metres relay	Qatar (QAT)	3:04.93	Bahrain (BHR)	3:06.23	Saudi Arabia (KSA)	3:06.57
20 km walk	Hassanine Sebei (TUN)	1:28:95	Hichem Medjeber (ALG)	1:31:08	Mabrook Saleh Nasser (QAT)	1:31:54
High jump	Mutaz Essa Barshim (QAT)	2.19 m	Ali Mohd Younes Idriss (SUD)	2.16 m	Muamer Aissa Barsham (QAT)	2.13 m
Pole vault	Mouhcine Cheaouri (MAR)	5.00 m	Mohamed Amin Romdhana (TUN)	4.90 m	Hichem Cherabi (ALG)	4.80 m
Long jump	Saleh Al-Haddad (KUW)	7.96 m w	Mohamed Qasin Al-Absi (KSA)	7.77 m w	Ahmed Fayez Al-Dosari (KSA)	7.63 m w
Triple jump	Issam Nima (ALG)	16.78 m	Rashid Al-Mannai (QAT)	15.97 m	Khaled Alsubaie (KUW)	15.95 m
Shot put	Mostafa Amr Ahmed Ahmed Hassan (EGY)	19.22 m	Mohamed Magdi Hamza (EGY)	18.38 m	Ahmad Gholoum (KUW)	18.08 m
Discus throw	Essa Al-Zenkawi (KUW)	63.22 m	Ahmed Mohamed Dheeb (QAT)	63.01 m	Mustafa Kazem Dagher (IRQ)	60.60 m
Hammer throw	Mostafa Al-Gamel (EGY)	74.81 m	Ashraf Amgad Elseify (QAT)	73.68 m	Alaa El-Din El-Ashry (EGY)	72.26 m
Javelin throw	Ihab El-Sayed (EGY)	80.72 m	Mohamad Mohd Kaida (QAT)	69.04 m	Abdullah Cherei (MAR)	68.59 m
Decathlon	Mohammed Jasem Al-Qaree (KSA)	7572 pts	Mohamed Ahmed Al-Mannai (QAT)	7233 pts	Ahmed Saber Ahmed (EGY)	7072 pts

=== Women ===
Event	Gold		Silver		Bronze	
100 metres (wind: +4.5 m/s)	Hajer Al-Amri (BHR)	11.64	Souheir Bouali (ALG)	11.64	Iman Jassem (BHR)	11.65
200 metres (wind: +2.2 m/s)	Edidiong Odiong (BHR)	22.98	Dana Hussain (IRQ)	23.69	Assia Raziki (MAR)	23.77
400 metres	Kemi Adekoya (BHR)	54.06	Souheir Bouali (ALG)	55.34	Amina Yussuf (BHR)	57.27
800 metres	Malika Akkaoui (MAR)	2:05:77	Betlhem Desalegn (UAE)	2:07.20	Marta Patoyota (BHR)	2:08.19
1500 metres	Amina Bakhit (SUD)	5:22.27	Rababe Arafi (MAR)	5:22.30	Betlhem Desalegn (UAE)	5:22.99
5000 metres	Mimi Belete (BHR)	16:50.90	Amina Bakhit (SUD)	16:54.21	Shitaye Eshete (BHR)	16:59.55
10,000 metres	Alia Saeed Mohammed (UAE)	32:16.97	Shitaye Eshete (BHR)	32:40.47	Eunice Chebichii Chumba (BHR)	33:44.74
100 metres hurdles (wind: +4.1 m/s)	Lamiae Lhabze (MAR)	13.53	Zaina Arkan Hamed (IRQ)	13.90	Buthaina Al-Yaqoubi (OMA)	15.00
400 metres hurdles	Lamiae Lhabze (MAR)	56.65	Kemi Adekoya (BHR)	57.68	Hayat Lambarki (MAR)	59.33
3000 metres steeplechase	Ruth Jebet (BHR)	9:39.61	Tigist Mekonnen (BHR)	9:42.01	Fadwa Sidi Madane (MAR)	10:05.56
4×100 metres relay	Bahrain (BHR)	46.40	Oman (OMA)	47.67	Qatar (QAT)	48.04
4×400 metres relay	Bahrain (BHR)	3:36.77	Morocco (MAR)	3:38.60	Sudan (SUD)	3:49.36
10 km walk	Chahinez Nasri (TUN)	50:34.4	Olfa Lafi (TUN)	50:45.9	Bariza Ghezelani (ALG)	54:15.4
High jump	Besnet Moussad Mohamed (EGY)	1.75 m	Rhizlane Siba (MAR)	1.75 m	Maryam Al-Ansari (BHR)	1.60 m
Pole vault	Syrine Balti (TUN)	4.10 m	Nisrine Dinar (MAR)	3.70 m	Dounia Abdulmunaem (EGY)	3.60 m
Long jump	Roumeissa Belabiod (ALG)	6.37 m	Jamaa Chnaik (MAR)	6.05 m	Esraa Samir Owis (EGY)	6.05 m
Triple jump	Jamaa Chnaik (MAR)	13.51 m	Mary Otoaruoh (BHR)	13.32 m	Fatma El-Hamadi (TUN)	12.89 m w
Shot put	Noora Salem Jasim (BHR)	14.97 m	Walaa Khalil (EGY)	14.77 m	Fadia Ibrahim (EGY)	14.48 m
Discus throw	Amina Moudden (MAR)	48.99 m	Sara Dardeeri (EGY)	47.37 m	Noora Salem Jasim (BHR)	47.05 m
Hammer throw	Zouina Bouzebra (ALG)	60.06 m	Sarra Ben Saïd (TUN)	58.96 m	Esraa Mohamed Habe (EGY)	57.60 m
Javelin throw	Nourhan Mohammed (EGY)	49.58 m	Reda Adel Ahmed (EGY)	47.44 m	Nada Chroudi (TUN)	43.17 m
Heptathlon	Huda Ahmed (EGY)	5404 pts	Nada Chroudi (TUN)	5211 pts	Wedian Mokhtar Abdelhamid (EGY)	4898 pts

== Medal table ==
Key

The host country is highlighted in lavender blue

Rank	Nation	Gold	Silver	Bronze	Total
1	Bahrain*	12	10	9	31
2	Morocco	8	6	6	20
3	Qatar	6	6	4	16
4	Egypt	6	5	7	18
5	Kuwait	4	1	2	7
6	Algeria	3	4	4	11
7	Tunisia	3	4	2	9
8	Saudi Arabia	1	2	1	4
8	Sudan	1	2	1	4
10	Djibouti	1	1	1	3
10	United Arab Emirates	1	1	1	3
12	Oman	0	4	0	4
13	Iraq	0	1	4	5
14	Comoros	0	0	0	0
14	Jordan	0	0	0	0
14	Lebanon	0	0	0	0
14	Libya	0	0	0	0
14	Palestine	0	0	0	0
14	Somalia	0	0	0	0
14	Yemen	0	0	0	0
Totals (20 entries)		46	47	42	135
