= Nagwa Ibrahim Saleh Ali =

Egyptian racewalker (born 1975)

Medal record

Women's athletics

Representing Egypt

African Championships
Gold medal – first place	1998 Dakar	5000 m walk
Gold medal – first place	2002 Radès	10 km walk
Gold medal – first place	2006 Bambous	20 km walk
Silver medal – second place	1996 Yaoundé	5000 m walk
Silver medal – second place	2000 Algiers	10 km walk

Nagwa Ibrahim Saleh Ali (born 10 June 1975) is an Egyptian former racewalker. She is the Egyptian record holder in the 20 kilometres walk with her time of 1:41:08 hours from 2002. She is a three-time African champion and represented Egypt at the IAAF World Race Walking Cup on four occasions.

Ali was among the foremost female walkers in Africa and among Arab countries during her career. She won three gold medals at the African Championships in Athletics, winning in 1998, 2002 and 2006. She was also runner-up in 1996 and 2000, finishing behind Algeria's Dounia Kara then Bahia Boussad. At the All-Africa Games she was twice a silver medallist, taking second place in the 5000 metres walk behind Kara in 1995, then finishing behind South Africa's Susan Vermeulen in the 10 kilometres walk in 1999.

In Arab regional competition, she was a gold medallist at the 1998 Arab Athletics Championships and at the 1999 Pan Arab Games. As at African-level, she was runner-up twice to Kara at the Arab Championships (1993 and 1995). The last medals of her international career came in 2007, when she placed second behind Tunisia's Chaima Trabelsi at both the 2007 Arab Athletics Championships and the Pan Arab Games.

As a junior, she represented Egypt at the 1994 World Junior Championships in Athletics. She was the champion at the 1994 Arab Junior Athletics Championships and runner-up at the 1994 African Junior Athletics Championships.

== International competitions ==
Year	Competition	Venue	Position	Event	Notes
1993	Arab Championships	Latakia, Syria	2nd	10,000 m walk	58:53.18
1994	African Junior Championships	Algiers, Algeria	2nd	5000 m walk	24:28.03
1994	World Junior Championships	Lisbon, Portugal	25th	5000 m walk	24:53.02
1994	Arab Junior Championships	Tunis, Tunisia	1st	5000 m walk	25:54.76 CR
1995	Arab Championships	Cairo, Egypt	2nd	10,000 m walk	52:23.8
1995	All-Africa Games	Harare, Zimbabwe	2nd	5000 m walk	24:25.3
1996	African Championships	Yaoundé, Cameroon	2nd	5000 m walk	24:05.40
1997	World Race Walking Cup	Poděbrady, Czech Republic	90th	10 km walk	49:51
1998	Arab Championships	Ta'if, Saudi Arabia	1st	20 km walk	52:19
1998	African Championships	Dakar, Senegal	1st	5000 m walk	24:28.42
1999	World Race Walking Cup	Mézidon-Canon, France	99th	20 km walk	1:52:46
1999	All-Africa Games	Johannesburg, South Africa	2nd	10 km walk	50:19
1999	Pan Arab Games	Irbid, Jordan	1st	10 km walk	51:06
2000	African Championships	Algiers, Algeria	2nd	10 km walk	50:15
2001	Francophonie Games	Ottawa, Canada	4th	10,000 m walk	47:27
2001	Mediterranean Games	Radès, Tunisia	7th	20 km walk	1:45:54
2002	World Race Walking Cup	Turin, Italy	51st	20 km walk	1:41:08
2002	African Championships	Radès, Tunisia	1st	10 km walk	49:26
2006	World Race Walking Cup	A Coruña, Spain	64th	20 km walk	1:46:42
2006	African Championships	Bambous, Mauritius	1st	20 km walk	1:43:22
2007	Arab Championships	Amman, Jordan	2nd	10 km walk	51:16.6
2007	Pan Arab Games	Cairo, Egypt	2nd	10,000 m walk	55:14.6

== National titles ==
- Egyptian Athletics Championships
  - 5000 m track walk: 1997, 1998, 1999, 2000, 2002
  - 10 km road walk: 1993, 1996, 1997
  - 10,000 metres: 1998, 1999

== See also ==
- List of champions of the African Championships in Athletics
