= African Race Walking Championships =

Former competition

- Sport: Race walking
- Founded: 1999
- Continent: Africa (CAA)

The African Race Walking Championships was a quadrennial race walking competition for athletes representing countries from Africa, organized by the Confederation of African Athletics (CAA). It was established in 1999 and has featured races for senior men (20 km) and women (10 km in 1999, 20 km from 2005 on). The 2005 edition was held jointly with the African Combined Events Championships. The 2009 edition also featured junior events (10 km men and women). The 2013 men's event was part of the IAAF World Race Walking Challenge.

== Editions ==
	Year	City	Country	Date
I	1999	Boumerdès	Algeria	
II	2005	El Menzah, Tunis	Tunisia	May 21-22
III	2009	Radès	Tunisia	April 19
IV	2013	Belle Vue	Mauritius	April 19
V	2015	Moka	Mauritius	April 11–12

== Results ==
Results were compiled from the Athletics Weekly, the Confederation of African Athletics, the IAAF, and the Fédération Suisse de Marche.

=== Men's results ===
==== 20 kilometres ====
Year	Gold		Silver		Bronze	
1999	Hatem Ghoula (TUN)	1:28:12	Moussa Aouanouk (ALG)	1:31:44	Merzak Abbès (ALG)	1:32:42
2005	Hatem Ghoula (TUN)	1:29:28	Moussa Aouanouk (ALG)	1:30:01	Hassanine Sebei (TUN)	1:32:31
2009	Hassanine Sebei (TUN)	1:24:15.5	Hichem Medjeber (ALG)	1:24:50.3	Ali Amrouch (ALG)	1:25:02.6
2013	Lebogang Shange (RSA)	1:28:31	Hassanine Sebei (TUN)	1:28:40	Hichem Medjeber (ALG)	1:32:26

==== 10 kilometres (Junior) ====
Year	Gold		Silver		Bronze	
2009	Mohamed Fetah Meddour (ALG)	45:37.6	Hedi Bougatfa (TUN)	45:57.1	Houcem Abdellaoui (ALG)	46:01.3

=== Women's results ===
==== 10 kilometres ====
Year	Gold		Silver		Bronze	
1999	Bahia Boussad (ALG)	51:36	Dounia Mimouni (ALG)	52:32	Wafa Mouelhi (TUN)	52:40

==== 20 kilometres ====
Year	Gold		Silver		Bronze	
2005	Bahia Boussad (ALG)	1:47:01	Rahma Mahmoudi (TUN)	1:48:11	Nicolene Cronje (RSA)	1:49:54
2009	Chaima Trabelsi (TUN)	1:37:43.4	Olfa Lafi (TUN)	1:37:58.2	Aynalem Bekashign Meshesha (ETH)	1:42:28.1

==== 10 kilometres (Junior) ====
Year	Gold		Silver		Bronze	
2009	Olfa Hamdi (TUN)	50:19.8	Sabrine Sellimi (TUN)	52:19.9	Jihad Adel Mohamed El Sayed Meshref (EGY)	55:05.0

== See also ==
- IAAF World Race Walking Cup
- European Race Walking Cup
- Pan American Race Walking Cup
- South American Race Walking Championships
- Asian Race Walking Championships
- Oceania Race Walking Championships
- Central American Race Walking Championships
