= 2018 African Championships in Athletics – Women's 20 kilometres walk =

The women's 20 kilometres walk event at the 2018 African Championships in Athletics was held on 5 August in Asaba, Nigeria.

== Results ==
Rank	Athlete	Nationality	Time	Notes
1st place, gold medalist(s)	Yehualeye Beletew	Ethiopia	1:31:46	NR
2nd place, silver medalist(s)	Grace Wanjiru	Kenya	1:35:54	
3rd place, bronze medalist(s)	Chahinez Nasri	Tunisia	1:37:28	
4	Olude Fadekemi	Nigeria	1:41:16	NR
5	Aynalem Eshetu	Ethiopia	1:42:40	
6	Beza Birhanu	Ethiopia	1:46:40	
7	Zelda Schultz	South Africa	1:48:36	
	Emily Ngii	Kenya	DNS	
