= Ethiopian Athletics Championships =

Annual Ethiopian athletic championship

- Sport: Track and field
- Founded: 1971
- Country: Ethiopia

The Ethiopian Athletics Championships is an annual outdoor track and field competition organised by the Ethiopian Athletics Federation, which serves as the national championship for the sport in Ethiopia. The competition was first held in 1971. Separate annual championship events are held for cross country running, road running and racewalking events.

== Events ==
The competition programme features a total of 34 individual Ethiopian Championship athletics events, 18 for men and 16 for women. For each of the sexes, there are seven track running events, three obstacle events, three jumps, and three throws. Only men compete in the pole vault and hammer throw events. Women's triple jump was added in 1997 and the steeplechase in 2006. The women's 3000 metres was replaced by the 5000 m in 1995 in line with international changes.

Track running

- 100 metres, 200 metres, 400 metres, 800 metres, 1500 metres, 5000 metres, 10,000 metres

Obstacle events

- 100 metres hurdles (women only), 110 metres hurdles (men only), 400 metres hurdles, 3000 metres steeplechase

Jumping events

- Pole vault (men only), high jump, long jump, triple jump

Throwing events

- Shot put, discus throw, javelin throw, hammer throw (men only)

== Championships records ==
=== Men ===
Event	Record	Athlete	Date	Place	Ref.
200 m	20.73 A (−1.5 m/s) NR	Merdekiyos Wolde	28 March 2026	Addis Ababa	
High jump	2.12 m A NR	Gemeda Abata	24 March 2026	Addis Ababa	
Long jump	8.04 m A (+1.6 m/s)	Buli Melaku	28 March 2026	Addis Ababa	
Long jump	8.13 m A NWI	Buli Melaku	10 May 2025	Addis Ababa	
Triple jump	16.30 m A (±0.0 m/s) NR	Bekele Jilo	25 March 2026	Addis Ababa	
Javelin throw	75.98 m A NR	Otag Ubang	28 March 2026	Addis Ababa	
10,000 m walk (track)	38:04.09 A NR	Misgana Wakuma	28 March 2026	Addis Ababa	

=== Women ===
Event	Record	Athlete	Date	Place	Ref.
100 m	11.77 A (+0.1 m/s)	Selamawit Kokeb	25 March 2026	Addis Ababa	
400 m	51.44 A	Genet Lire	13 June 2014	Addis Ababa	
100 m hurdles					
Discus throw	46.38 m A NR	Alemitu Teklesilassie	25 March 2026	Addis Ababa	
10,000 m walk (track)	44:49.0 h A NR	Yehualeye Beletew	11 April 2021	Addis Ababa	

== See also ==
- 2019 Ethiopian Athletics Championships
