= 2019 Ethiopian Athletics Championships =

- Edition: 48th
- Dates: 7–12 May
- Host city: Addis Ababa, Ethiopia
- Venue: Addis Ababa Stadium
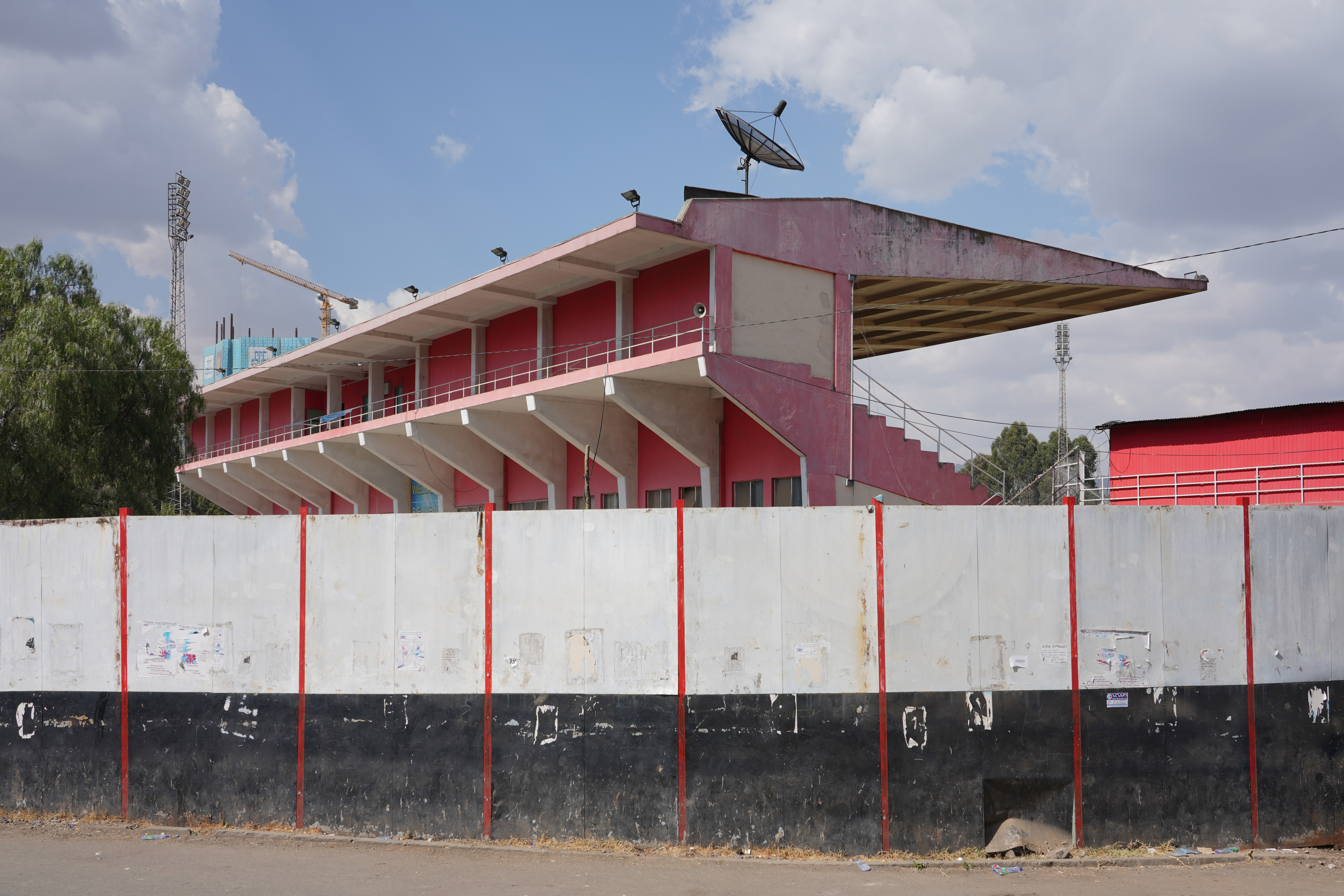
- Events: 40

The 2019 Ethiopian Athletics Championships (Amharic: 48ኛው የኢትዮጵያ አትሌቲክስ ሻምፒዮና) was the 48th edition of the national outdoor track and field championships for Ethiopia. It took place from 7–12 May 2019 in Addis Ababa at the Addis Ababa Stadium. A total of 40 events were contested by 1376 athletes (including 563 women).

Oromia Region won the men's team competition, while Mekelakeya won both the women's team and overall team titles.

== Results ==
=== Men ===
Event	Gold		Silver		Bronze	
100 metres	Nathan Abebe	10.70 s	Tewodros Atnaf	10.79 s	Abdulsetar Kemal	11.12 s
200 metres	Nathan Abebe	21.05 s	Efrem Mekonnen	21.29 s	Henok Birhanu	21.48 s
400 metres	Amdurahman Abdo	46.15 s	Ephrem Mekonnen	46.52 s	Mustefa Edeo	46.75 s
800 metres	Adisu Girma	1:47.66 min	Omer Amano	1:48.03 min	Bacha Morka	1:48.57 min
1500 metres	Tadesse Lemi	3:38.48 min	Kebede Endale	3:41.64 min	Birhanu Sorsa	3:42.44 min
5000 metres	Telahun Haile Bekele	13:36.21 min	Abe Gashaw	13:40.02 min	Gemechu Dadi	13:46.42 min
10,000 metres	Selemon Barega	28:23.67 min	Andamlak Belihu	28:25.65 min	Abadi Hadis	28:29.39 min
110 m hurdles	Ibrahim Jemal	14.10 s	Samuel Esubalew	14.32 s	Gulebo Dasaye	14.52 s
400 m hurdles	Derese Tesfaye	51.27 s	Gadisa Bayu	51.82 s	Deribe Maraton	52.06 s
3000 m s'chase	Getnet Wale	8:29.91 min	Takele Nigate	8:31.32 min	Tesfaye Deriba	8:32.20 min
4 × 100 m relay	Oromia Region	41.68 s	Ethio Electric	41.95 s	Amhara Region	42.66 s
4 × 400 m relay	Oromia Region	3:08.03 min	Ethiopian Youth Academy	3:13.60 min	Zebidar	3:13.93 min
10,000 m walk	Yohanis Algaw	42:41.55 min	Tadilo Getu	43:01.53 min	Birara Alem	43:14.55 min
High jump	Lim Koungdoup	2.10 m	Adir Gur	2.08 m	Stevem Yawal	2.00 m
Pole vault	Samson Bacha	4.00 m	Abebe Aynalem	3.90 m	Mezgebu Birara	3.80 m
Long jump	Omod Okugn	7.57 m	Binini Anbese	7.38 m	Sarka Tuke	7.36 m
Triple jump	Adir Gur	15.88 m	Binini Anbese	15.57 m	Josef Obang	15.35 m
Shot put	Zegeye Moga	14.89 m	Mekuriya Haile	14.28 m	Nanawi Gindebo	14.15 m
Discus throw	Mamush Taye	43.14 m	Gebeyehu Gebreyesus	42.14 m	Getachew Temesgen	41.36 m
Hammer throw	Abraham Toncho	47.38 m	Kebede Chuba	46.90 m	Biruk Abraham	46.37 m
Javelin throw	Uto Okelo	69.30 m	Ubang Ubang	68.14 m	Kereyu Bulala	66.71 m
Team	Oromia Region	141 pts	Mekelakeya	125 pts	Sidama Coffee	109 pts

=== Women ===
Event	Gold		Silver		Bronze	
100 metres	Worke Kumalo	12.07 s	Seada Siraj	12.11 s	Ebise Kebede	12.40 s
200 metres	Seada Siraj	24.35 s	Feye Frew	24.68 s	Kechatu Mekuriya	24.92 s
400 metres	Worknesh Melese	53.40 s	Misgana Hailu	53.66 s	Tsige Duguma	54.28 s
800 metres	Hirut Meshesha	2:02.48 min	Diribe Welteji	2:02.84 min	Freweyni Hailu	2:03.11 min
1500 metres	Lemlem Hailu	4:18.31 min	Adanech Anbesa	4:19.32 min	Melkam Alemayehu	4:19.66 min
5000 metres	Fantu Worku	15:53.29 min	Hawi Feysa	15:54.44 min	Alemitu Tariku	15:57.52 min
10,000 metres	Letesenbet Gidey	32:10.13 min	Tsehay Gemechu	32:17.20 min	Netsanet Gudeta	32:17.82 min
100 m hurdles	Gebeyanesh Gedecha	14.45 s	Alemitu Assefa	14.65 s	Meskerem Gizew	14.84 s
400 m hurdles	Gebeyanesh Gedecha	58.30 s	Alemitu Assefa	60.00 s	Bezaalem Desta	60.94 s
3000 m s'chase	Birtukan Adamu	10:03.03 min	Mekides Abebe	10:04.40 min	Weynshet Ansa	10:08.68 min
4 × 100 m relay	Mekelakeya	47.63 s	Sidama Coffee	48.03 s	Amhara Region	49.44 s
4 × 400 m relay	Ethio Electric	3:41.67 min	Mekelakeya	3:41.85 min	Oromia Region	?
10,000 m walk	Yehualye Beletew	45:41.86 min	Mare Bitew	48:39.34 min	Aynalem Eshetu	49:07.40 min
High jump	Ariyat Dibow Ubang	1.76 m	Ajuda Umed	1.60 m	Kiru Uman	1.60 m
Long jump	Kiru Uman	5.77 m	Ariyat Dibow Ubang	5.65 m	Ajuda Umed	5.43 m
Triple jump	Ajuda Umed	12.70 m	Ariyat Dibow Ubang	12.65 m	Amar Ubang	12.51 m
Shot put	Zurga Usman	13.55 m	Amele Yibeltal	12.63 m	Selamawit Mare	12.15 m
Discus throw	Merhawit Tshaye	42.76 m	Zurga Usman	39.31 m	Alemitu Teklesilassie	39.23 m
Javelin throw	Abeba Abera Bune	43.58 m	Bizunesh Tadesse Jilo	43.04 m	Ber Asach	42.86 m
Team	Mekelakeya	161 pts	Oromia Region	106 pts	Commercial Bank of Ethiopia	88 pts

=== Mixed ===
Event	Gold		Silver		Bronze	
Combined team	Mekelakeya	286 pts	Oromia Region	247 pts	Sidama Coffee	195 pts
