= Nicolene =

Nicolene is a feminine given name. Notable people with the name include:

- Nicolene Cronje (born 1983), South African racewalker
- Nicolene Limsnukan (born 1998), Thai-American model
- Nicolene Neal (born 1970), South African lawn bowler
- Nicolene Terblanche (born 1988), South African field hockey player
