= Athletics at the 2011 All-Africa Games – Women's 20 kilometres walk =

Women Walk competition

The women's 20 kilometres walk event at the 2011 All-Africa Games was held on 14 September.

== Results ==
Rank	Name	Nationality	Time	Notes
1st place, gold medalist(s)	Chaïma Trabelsi	Tunisia	1:40:35	
2nd place, silver medalist(s)	Olfa Lafi	Tunisia	1:41:25	
3rd place, bronze medalist(s)	Aynalem Eshetu	Ethiopia	1:42:19	
4	Emily Wamusyi Ngii	Kenya	1:43:28	
5	Asnakech Ararissa	Ethiopia	1:50:32	
6	Grace Thoithi	Kenya	1:51:32	
7	Adanech Mengistu	Ethiopia	1:53:37	
