= 2013 IAAF Race Walking Challenge =

International race walking event

The 2013 IAAF Race Walking Challenge was the tenth edition of the annual international racewalking series organised by the International Association of Athletics Federations (IAAF).

== Calendar ==
The following meetings, as well as the competition final, formed the schedule of the 2013 Race Walking Challenge. The "A" category meetings are worth the most points, with progressively fewer points being available through the "B" and "C" categories.

Date	Meeting	Category	Events	Venue	Country	Report
23 February	Circuito Internacional de Marcha Chihuahua	C	20 km (Men/Women); 50 km (Men)	Chihuahua City	Mexico	
24 February	Oceania Race Walk Championships	C	20 km (Men/Women)	Hobart	Australia	
1 March	IAAF Race Walking Challenge Taicang	B	10 km (Men/Women)	Taicang	China	
10 March	Asian 20 km Race Walking Championships	B	20 km (Men/Women)	Nomi	Japan	
17 March	Lugano Trophy - Memorial Mario Albisetti	C	20 km (Men/Women)	Lugano	Switzerland	
6 April	Grande Prémio Internacional de Rio Maior em Marcha Atlética	B	20 km (Men/Women)	Rio Maior	Portugal	
6 April	African Race Walking Championships	B	20 km (Men/Women)	Belle Vue Harel	Mauritius	
13 April	Poděbrady Race Walking	B	20 km (Men/Women)	Poděbrady	Czech Republic	
1 May	Coppa Città di Sesto San Giovanni	B	20 km (Men/Women)	Sesto San Giovanni	Italy	
19 May	10th European Cup Race Walking	C	10 km (Women); 20 km (Men); 50 km (Men)	Dudince	Slovakia	
1 June	Gran Premio Cantones de La Coruña	B	10 km (Men/Women)	A Coruña	Spain	
29 June	Dublin Grand Prix of Race Walking	C	20 km (Men/Women)	Dublin	Ireland	
10–18 August	14th IAAF World Championships in Athletics	A	20 km (Men/Women); 50 km (Men)	Moscow	Russia	

== Winners ==
#	Meeting	Men's winners			Women's winners	
#	Meeting	10 km	20 km	50 km	10 km	20 km
1	Chihuahua		Isaac Palma (MEX)	Erik Tysse (NOR)		Inês Henriques (POR)
2	Hobart					
3	Taicang	Li Jianbo (CHN)			Sun Huanhuan (CHN)	
4	Nomi City		Yusuke Suzuki (JPN)			Kumi Otoshi (JPN)
5	Lugano		Zhen Wang (CHN)			Hong Liu (CHN)
6	Rio Maior		João Vieira (POR)			Elena Lashmanova (RUS)
7	Belle Vue Harel					
8	Poděbrady					
9	Sesto San Giovanni		Matej Tóth (SVK)			Elena Lashmanova (RUS)
10	Dudince					
11	La Coruña		Jared Tallent (AUS)			Inês Henriques (POR)
12	Dublin					
13	Moscow		Aleksandr Ivanov (RUS)	Robert Heffernan (IRL)		Elena Lashmanova (RUS)
Overall points winner		Jared Tallent (AUS)			Elena Lashmanova (RUS)	
