= 2006 African Championships in Athletics – Women's 20 kilometres walk =

The women's 20 kilometres walk event at the 2006 African Championships in Athletics was held in Bambous, Mauritius on August 13.

== Results ==
Rank	Name	Nationality	Time	Notes
1st place, gold medalist(s)	Nagwa Ibrahim Saleh Ali	Egypt	1:43:22	
2nd place, silver medalist(s)	Asnakch Ararissa	Ethiopia	1:45:31	
3rd place, bronze medalist(s)	Ghania Amzal	Algeria	1:46:05	
4	Bahia Boussad	Algeria	1:47:34	
5	Cheima Trabelsi	Tunisia	1:48:53	
6	Bekashign Aynalem	Ethiopia	1:49:37	
7	Yolène Raffin	Mauritius	1:49:53	
8	Suzanne Erasmus	South Africa	1:51:45	
	Nicolene Cronje	South Africa	DNF	
	Jacqueline Ako Bludo	Ghana	DNS	
