= 2016 African Championships in Athletics – Women's 20 kilometres walk =

The women's 20 kilometres walk event at the 2016 African Championships in Athletics was held on 26 June in Durban.

== Results ==
Rank	Athlete	Nationality	Time	Notes
1st place, gold medalist(s)	Grace Wanjiru	Kenya	1:30:43	CR, AR
2nd place, silver medalist(s)	Yehualeye Beletew	Ethiopia	1:31:58	NR
3rd place, bronze medalist(s)	Chahinez Nasri	Tunisia	1:34:45	
4	Anél Oosthuizen	South Africa	1:38:46	
5	Linda Waweru	Kenya	1:39:23	
6	Alem Tafes	Ethiopia	1:45:45	
7	Bariza Ghezelani	Algeria	1:46:33	
8	Amira Zenyhim	Egypt	1:58.22	
	Aynalem Eshetu	Ethiopia	DNF	
