= 2010 African Championships in Athletics – Women's 20 kilometres walk =

The women's 20 kilometres walk at the 2010 African Championships in Athletics was held on August 1.

== Results ==
Rank	Name	Nationality	Time	Notes
1st place, gold medalist(s)	Grace Wanjiru Njue	Kenya	1:34:19	AR, CR
2nd place, silver medalist(s)	Chaima Trabelsi	Tunisia	1:35:33	
3rd place, bronze medalist(s)	Aynalem Eshetu	Ethiopia	1:41:46	SB
4	Emily Wamusyi Ngii	Kenya	1:44:51	
5	Bekashign Aynalem	Ethiopia	1:46:03	
6	Esther Kithinji Murugi	Kenya	1:46:24	
	Asnakch Ararissa	Ethiopia	DQ	
	Olafi Lafi	Tunisia	DQ	
