= 2012 African Championships in Athletics – Women's 20 kilometres walk =

The women's 20 kilometre walk at the 2012 African Championships in Athletics was held at the Stade Charles de Gaulle on 29 June.

== Medalists ==
| Gold | Grace Wanjiru; Kenya |
| Silver | Olfa Lafi; Tunisia |
| Bronze | Aynalem Eshetu; Ethiopia |

== Records ==
Standing records prior to the 2012 African Championships in Athletics
| World record | Vera Sokolova (RUS) | 1:25:08 | Sochi, Russia | 26 February 2011 |
| African record | Grace Wanjiru (KEN) | 1:34:19 | Nairobi, Kenya | 1 August 2010 |
| Championship record | Grace Wanjiru (KEN) | 1:34:19 | Nairobi, Kenya | 1 August 2010 |

== Schedule ==
| Date | Time | Round |
|---|---|---|
| 29 June 2012 | 10:30 | Final |

== Results ==
=== Final ===
| Rank | Name | Nationality | Time | Note |
|---|---|---|---|---|
| 1st place, gold medalist(s) | Grace Wanjiru | Kenya | 1:40:53 | |
| 2nd place, silver medalist(s) | Olfa Lafi | Tunisia | 1:46:17 | |
| 3rd place, bronze medalist(s) | Aynalem Eshetu | Ethiopia | 1:49:45 | |
| 4 | Askale Tiksa | Ethiopia | 1:56:01 | |
| 5 | Adanech Mengistu | Ethiopia | 2:04:45 | |
| | Chaïma Trabelsi | Tunisia | DNF | |
