= 2022 African Championships in Athletics – Women's 20 kilometres walk =

The women's 20 kilometres walk event at the 2022 African Championships in Athletics was held on 12 June in Port Louis, Mauritius.

== Results ==
Rank	Athlete	Nationality	Time	Notes
1st place, gold medalist(s)	Emily Wamusyi Ngii	Kenya	1:34:30	
2nd place, silver medalist(s)	Yehualeye Beletew	Ethiopia	1:35:48	
3rd place, bronze medalist(s)	Silvia Kemboi	Kenya	1:39:40	
4	Wubalem Shugute	Ethiopia	1:42:34	
5	Souad Azzi	Algeria	1:43:55	
6	Mare Betwe	Ethiopia	1:45:36	
7	Marissa Swanepoel	South Africa	1:50:44	
8	Sonia Soodon	Mauritius	2:06:46	
