= Athletics at the 2015 African Games – Women's 20 kilometres walk =

The women's 20 kilometres walk event at the 2015 African Games was held on 15 September.

== Results ==
Rank	Name	Nationality	Time	Notes
1st place, gold medalist(s)	Grace Wanjiru	Kenya	1:38:28	GR
2nd place, silver medalist(s)	Aynalem Eshetu	Ethiopia	1:39:49	
3rd place, bronze medalist(s)	Askale Tiksa	Ethiopia	1:42:25	SB
4	Grace Nyawira	Kenya	1:44:33	
5	Anel Oosthuizen	South Africa	1:46:16	
6	Chehine Nasri	Tunisia	1:48:43	
7	Adanech Mengistu	Ethiopia	1:51:16	
8	Bazira Ghezlani	Algeria	1:56:07	
9	Faustina Oguh	Nigeria	2:06:00	
10	Lilia Bitsoumani	Republic of the Congo	2:13:45	NR
