= List of Ethiopian records in athletics =

The following are the national records in athletics in Ethiopia maintained by Ethiopian Athletic Federation (EAF).

== Outdoor ==
Key to tables: Awaiting ratification Record not kept by EAF Not ratified or later rescinded by EAF

# = not recognised by IAAF
y = denotes 880 yards

=== Men ===
Event	Record	Athlete	Date	Meet	Place	Ref.	Video
100 m	10.61 A (−0.4 m/s)	Wetere Galcha	30 April 2008	African Championships	Addis Ababa, Ethiopia		
100 m	10.52 A NWI	Amanuel Abebe	27 June 2013		Addis Ababa, Ethiopia		
100 m	10.1 A h	Egzi Gebre-Gebre	6 June 1971		Addis Ababa, Ethiopia		
100 m	10.35 A (−0.2 m/s)	Biniyam Philipos	18 April 2026	Addis Ababa Grand Prix	Addis Ababa, Ethiopia		
100 m	10.35 A (−1.4 m/s)	Biniyam Philipos	29 April 2026	Ethiopian U20 Championships	Addis Ababa, Ethiopia		
200 m	20.73 A (−1.5 m/s)	Merdekiyos Wolde	28 March 2026	Ethiopian Championships	Addis Ababa, Ethiopia		
200 m	20.7 h A	Negussie Gechamo	17 May 1998		Addis Ababa, Ethiopia		
200 m	20.7 h A	Negussie Gechamo	17 May 1998		Addis Ababa, Ethiopia		
400 m	45.42 A	Tegegne Bezabeh	18 October 1968	Olympic Games	Mexico City, Mexico		
800 m	1:42.37	Mohammed Aman	6 September 2013	Memorial Van Damme	Brussels, Belgium		
1000 m	2:15.75	Mohammed Aman	5 September 2014	Memorial Van Damme	Brussels, Belgium		
1500 m	3:29.51	Lamecha Girma	30 June 2023	Athletissima	Lausanne, Switzerland		
Mile	3:48.60	Aman Wote	31 May 2014	Prefontaine Classic	Eugene, United States		
Mile (road)	3:59.40	Teddese Lemi	1 October 2023	World Road Running Championships	Riga, Latvia		
3000 m	7:21.28	Berihu Aregawi	25 August 2024	Kamila Skolimoswka Memorial	Chorzów, Poland		
5000 m	12:36.73	Hagos Gebrhiwet	30 May 2024	Bislett Games	Oslo, Norway		
5 km (road)	12:49	Berihu Aregawi	31 December 2021	Cursa dels Nassos	Barcelona, Spain		
10,000 m	26:17.53	Kenenisa Bekele	26 August 2005	Memorial Van Damme	Brussels, Belgium		
10 km (road)	26:31	Yomif Kejelcha	16 February 2025	10K Facsa Castellón	Castellón de la Plana, Spain		
15 km (road)	40:39+	Yomif Kejelcha	23 August 2026	21K Buenos Aires	Buenos Aires, Argentina		
10 miles (road)	44:24 (Note: The Association of Road Racing Statisticians regard Gebrselassie's time to be 44:23 based on initially reported stopped times of 44:22.8, 44:23.0 and 44:23.1. The race organisers do not confirm these times and officially regard the time to be 44:24)	Haile Gebrselassie	4 September 2005		Tilburg, Netherlands		
20,000 m (track)	56:25.98+	Haile Gebrselassie	27 June 2007	Golden Spike Ostrava	Ostrava, Czech Republic		
20 km (road)	54:02+	Yomif Kejelcha	23 August 2026	21K Buenos Aires	Buenos Aires, Argentina		
Half marathon	56:51	Yomif Kejelcha	23 August 2026	21K Buenos Aires	Buenos Aires, Argentina		
One hour	21285 m	Haile Gebrselassie	27 June 2007	Golden Spike Ostrava	Ostrava, Czech Republic		
25 km (road)	1:11:37 #	Haile Gebrselassie	12 March 2006	20 van Alphen	Alphen aan den Rijn, Netherlands		
25 km (road)	1:11:41+	Yomif Kejelcha	26 April 2026	London Marathon	London, United Kingdom		
30 km (road)	1:26:03+	Dawit Wolde	3 December 2023	Valencia Marathon	Valencia, Spain		
30 km (road)	1:26:03+	Sisay Lemma	3 December 2023	Valencia Marathon	Valencia, Spain		
30 km (road)	1:26:03+	Yomif Kejelcha	26 April 2026	London Marathon	London, United Kingdom		
Marathon	1:59:41	Yomif Kejelcha	26 April 2026	London Marathon	London, United Kingdom		
50 km (road)	2:42:07	Ketema Negasa	23 May 2021	Nedbank Runified Race	Port Elizabeth, South Africa		
110 m hurdles	14.62 (−0.1 m/s)	Behailu Alemshet	13 September 2015	African Games	Brazzaville, Republic of the Congo		
110 m hurdles	14.3 h A	Ubang Abaya	4 June 2005		Addis Ababa, Ethiopia		
400 m hurdles	51.26	Aschalew Tesfaye	1 September 1988	African Championships	Annaba, Algeria		
400 m hurdles	51.18		1998				
400 m hurdles	50.71 A	Gadisa Bayu	25 May 2018	Ethiopian U20 Championships	Asella, Ethiopia		
3000 m steeplechase	7:52.11	Lamecha Girma	9 June 2023	Meeting de Paris	Paris, France		
High jump	2.12 m A	Gemeda Abata	24 March 2026	Ethiopian Championships	Addis Ababa, Ethiopia		
Pole vault	4.40 m	Mezegebu Birara	19 May 2017		Addis Ababa, Ethiopia		
Long jump	7.50 m A	Gashawbeza Lemma	1989		Addis Ababa, Ethiopia		
Long jump	8.09 m A NWI (Note: not legal as of World Athletics profile, nevertheless recognised as Ethiopian record by same source)	Omod Okugn	10 March 2022		Asella, Ethiopia		
Long jump	8.13 m A NWI	Buli Melaku	10 May 2025	Ethiopian Championships	Addis Ababa, Ethiopia		
Long jump	8.04 m A (+1.6 m/s)	Buli Melaku	28 March 2026	Ethiopian Championships	Addis Ababa, Ethiopia		
Triple jump	16.30 m A (±0.0 m/s)	Bekele Jilo	25 March 2026	Ethiopian Championships	Addis Ababa, Ethiopia		
Shot put	15.98 m A	Samuel Kassaye	February 1976		Addis Ababa, Ethiopia		
Discus throw	45.57 m A	Samuel Kassaye	28 August 1970		Nairobi, Kenya		
Hammer throw	48.16 m	Biruk Abraham Arro	20–24 April 2016		Addis Ababa, Ethiopia		
Javelin throw	77.62 m (Note: by World Athletics source; 77.60 m by official result source)	Otag Ubang	17 May 2026	African Championships	Accra, Ghana		
Decathlon	5918 pts A	Bekele Tola	11–12 August 1987	All-Africa Games	Nairobi, Kenya		
Decathlon	100m (wind) / Long jump (wind) / Shot put / High jump / 400m / 110m H (wind) / Discus / Pole vault / Javelin / 1500m; 11.97 / 5.89 m / 11.05 m / 1.63 m / 51.83 / 17.58 / 30.48 m / 2.80 m / 59.64 m / 4:14.63						
10,000 m walk (track)	38:04.09 A	Misgana Wakuma	28 March 2026	Ethiopian Championships	Addis Ababa, Ethiopia		
10 km walk (road)	38:39	Misgana Wakuma	26 July 2025	International Race Walking Competitions Voronovo Cup	Voronovo, Russia		
20 km walk (road)	1:18:47	Misgana Wakuma	16 May 2026	African Championships	Accra, Ghana		
50 km walk (road)	4:58:54	Debeko Yanka Degife	14 May 2006		A Coruña, Spain		
4 × 100 m relay	40.76 A	Ethiopia; Abyot Lencho; Mohammed Jud-Misbach; Terefe Takiso; Wetere Galcha	2 May 2008	African Championships	Addis Ababa, Ethiopia		
4 × 400 m relay	3:07.11	Ethiopia; A. Tesfaye; B. Worku; O. Bach; A. Gudeta	2 September 1988	African Championships	Annaba, Algeria		
Distance medley relay	9:16.34	Aisinet Abiyot 2:53.5 (1200m); Bereket Desta 46.0 (400m); Mohammed Aman 1:44.0 (800m); Aman Wote 3:52.8 (1600 m)	27 April 2013	Penn Relays	Philadelphia, United States		
4 × 1500 m relay	14:41.22	Ethiopia; Mekonnen Gebremedhin; Soresa Fida; Zebene Alemayehu; Aman Wote	25 May 2014	IAAF World Relays	Nassau, Bahamas		

=== Women ===
Event	Record	Athlete	Date	Meet	Place	Ref.
100 m	12.10	Fethiya Hassen	3 June 2011		Dar es Salaam, Tanzania	
100 m	11.8 A	Atkelt Wubeshet	5 May 2005		Addis Ababa, Ethiopia	
100 m	11.55 A	Atkelt Wubeshet	20 April 2006		Addis Ababa, Ethiopia	
100 m	11.77 A (+0.1 m/s)	Selamawit Kokeb	25 March 2026	Ethiopian Championships	Addis Ababa, Ethiopia	
200 m	23.84 A (−1.6 m/s)	Tegest Tamangnu Yuma	8 March 2015	African Junior Championships	Addis Ababa, Ethiopia	
400 m	51.37	Ajayeba Aliye	13 May 2026	African Championships	Accra, Ghana	
600 m	1:26.53	Habitam Alemu	12 May 2023	Meeting National	Toulon, France	
800 m	1:56.67	Werkwuha Getachew	8 June 2021	Ethiopian Olympic Trials	Hengelo, Netherlands	
1000 m	2:34.11	Habitam Alemu	8 May 2022	Internationales thallos Läufermeeting	Pliezhausen, Germany	
1500 m	3:50.07	Genzebe Dibaba	17 July 2015	Herculis	Fontvieille, Monaco	
Mile	4:11.88	Gudaf Tsegay	19 July 2025	London Athletics Meet	London, United Kingdom	
Mile (road)	4:20.98 Wo	Diribe Welteji	1 October 2023	World Road Running Championships	Riga, Latvia	
2000 m	5:25.86	Freweyni Hailu	14 September 2021	Hanžeković Memorial	Zagreb, Croatia	
3000 m	8:19.52	Ejgayehu Taye	28 August 2021	Meeting de Paris	Paris, France	
Two miles	8:58.58	Meseret Defar	14 September 2007	Memorial Van Damme	Brussels, Belgium	
5000 m	14:00.21	Gudaf Tsegay	17 September 2023	Prefontaine Classic	Eugene, United States	
5 km (road)	14:29 Wo	Senbere Teferi	12 September 2021	Road to Records	Herzogenaurach, Germany	
5 km (road)	14:15 Mx	Marta Alemayo	4 April 2026	Urban Trail de Lille	Lille, France	
10,000 m	29:01.03	Letesenbet Gidey	8 June 2021	Ethiopian Olympic Trials	Hengelo, Netherlands	
10 km (road)	29:14 Mx	Yalemzerf Yehualaw	27 February 2022	Castellón 10K	Castellón de la Plana, Spain	
10 km (road)	30:16 Wo	Asefu Abreha	4 October 2026	tRUNsylvania International 10K Brasov	Brașov, Romania	
15 km (road)	44:20 Mx	Letesenbet Gidey	17 November 2019	Zevenheuvelenloop	Nijmegen, Netherlands	
15 km (road)	46:25+ Wo	Yalemzerf Yehualaw	17 October 2020	World Half Marathon Championships	Gdynia, Poland	
10 miles (road)	49:21+ Mx	Tsigie Gebreselama	11 January 2026	Houston Half Marathon	Houston, United States	
10 miles (road)	49:21+ Mx	Fentaye Belayneh	11 January 2026	Houston Half Marathon	Houston, United States	
20,000 m (track)	1:05:35.3	Dire Tune	12 June 2008	Golden Spike Ostrava	Ostrava, Czech Republic	
One hour	18517 m	Dire Tune	12 June 2008	Golden Spike Ostrava	Ostrava, Czech Republic	
20 km (road)	59:35 Mx+	Letesenbet Gidey	24 October 2021	Valencia Half Marathon	Valencia, Spain	
20 km (road)	1:02:04+ Wo	Yalemzerf Yehualaw	17 October 2020	World Half Marathon Championships	Gdynia, Poland	
Half marathon	1:05:32 Wo	Senbere Teferi	27 October 2019	Valencia Half Marathon	Valencia, Spain	
Half marathon	1:02:52 Mx	Letesenbet Gidey	24 October 2021	Valencia Half Marathon	Valencia, Spain	
25 km (road)	1:16:50+ Mx	Fotyen Tesfay	15 March 2026	Barcelona Marathon	Barcelona, Spain	
25 km (road)	1:19:14+ Wo	Tigst Assefa	27 April 2025	London Marathon	London, United Kingdom	
30 km (road)	1:32:00+ Mx	Fotyen Tesfay	15 March 2026	Barcelona Marathon	Barcelona, Spain	
30 km (road)	1:35:21+ Wo	Tigst Assefa	26 April 2026	London Marathon	London, United Kingdom	
Marathon	2:10:51 Mx	Fotyen Tesfay	15 March 2026	Barcelona Marathon	Barcelona, Spain	
Marathon	2:15:50 Wo	Tigst Assefa	27 April 2025	London Marathon	London, United Kingdom	
Marathon	2:15:41 Wo	Tigst Assefa	26 April 2026	London Marathon	London, United Kingdom	
50 km (road)	3:00:29 Wo	Emane Seifu Hayile	26 February 2023	Nedbank Runified Breaking Barriers 50km	Gqeberha, South Africa	
100 m hurdles	16.14	Wali Engida	16 September 1995	All-Africa Games	Harare, Zimbabwe	
100 m hurdles	15.22 A #	Asegedech Bekele	16 September 1995		Addis Ababa, Ethiopia	
400 m hurdles	57.60 A	Zewde Hailemariam	8 August 1987	All-Africa Games	Nairobi, Kenya	
Mile steeplechase	5:06.53	Wosane Asefa	22 August 2025	Memorial Van Damme	Brussels, Belgium	
3000 m steeplechase	8:54.61	Werkuha Getachew	20 July 2022	World Championships	Eugene, United States	
High jump	1.81 m	Ariyat Dibow Ubang	27 August 2019	African Games	Rabat, Morocco	
Pole vault	1.60 m	Aynalem Testa	4 June 2016		Alicante, Spain	
Long jump	6.23 m	Hiwot Sisaye	23 June 1993	African Championships	Durban, South Africa	
Triple jump	12.94 m	Ariyat Dibo Ubang	16 May 2017	Ethiopian Championships	Addis Ababa, Ethiopia	
Shot put	13.92 m	Zurga Usuman Musa	22 March 2024	African Games	Accra, Ghana	
Discus throw	46.38 m A	Alemitu Teklesilassie	25 March 2026	Ethiopian Championships	Addis Ababa, Ethiopia	
Hammer throw	5.44 m	Birtukan Bouele	18 July 2020	International Lucerne Masters Throws Pentathlon	Lucerne, Switzerland	
Javelin throw	51.46 m A	Dingete Adela	7 March 2022	Ethiopian U20 Championships	Addis Ababa, Ethiopia	
Weight throw	4.22 m	Birtukan Bouele	18 July 2020	International Lucerne Masters Throws Pentathlon	Lucerne, Switzerland	
Heptathlon	3270 pts A	Genet Tebalew	8–9 August 1987	All-Africa Games	Nairobi, Kenya	
Heptathlon	100m H (wind) / High jump / Shot put / 200m (wind) / Long jump (wind) / Javelin / 800m; 17.39 / 1.30 m / 8.13 m / 29.11 / 4.12 m / 27.18 m / 2:38.11					
3000 m walk (track)	20:29.0	Birtukan Bouele	1 May 2023	Challenge André Oudot	Besançon, France	
5000 m walk (track)	22:48.25 A	Ayalnesh Dejene	18 July 2015	World Youth Championships	Cali, Colombia	
5 km walk (road)	35:12.0	Birtukan Bouele	26 February 2023	Championnats de France des 100km marche	Bourges, France	
10,000 m walk (track)	44:49.0 h	Yehualeye Beletew	11 April 2021	Ethiopian Championships	Addis Ababa, Ethiopia	
10 km walk (road)	45:40+	Askale Tiksa Benti	7 May 2016	World Race Walking Team Championships	Rome, Italia	
15 km walk (road)	1:10:11+	Askale Tiksa Benti	7 May 2016	World Race Walking Team Championships	Rome, Italia	
20 km walk (road)	1:31:32	Yehualeye Beletew	11 June 2021	47th International Race Walking Festival	Alytus, Lithuania	
50 km walk (road)						
4 × 100 m relay	46.46 A	Ethiopia; Mantegbosh Melese; Fetiya Kedir; Leaynet Alemu; Fantu Magiso	30 July 2010	African Championships	Nairobi, Kenya	
4 × 100 m relay	45.66	Ethiopia; Yabsira Jarso Guyo; Rahel Tesfaye; Eyayu Mekuanent; Baytula Ayalu	20 March 2024	African Games	Accra, Ghana	
4 × 400 m relay	3:33.18 A	Ethiopia; Banchalem Bikese; Rahel Tesfaye; Genet Ayele; Ajayeba Aliye	2 May 2026	World Relays	Gaborone, Botswana	
4 × 800 m relay	8:30.65	Dureti Edeo; Feyne Gudeto; Tizita Bogale; Alem Gereziher	27 April 2013	Penn Relays	Philadelphia, United States	

=== Mixed ===
Event	Record	Athlete	Date	Meet	Place	Ref.
4 × 400 m relay	3:24.5 h	Ethiopia; W. Tolosa; H. Tadese; M. Assefa; T. Dguma	26 December 2021		Addis Ababa, Ethiopia	

== Indoor ==
=== Men ===
Event	Record	Athlete	Date	Meet	Place	Ref.
60 m	6.82	Berhane Haile	12 January 1991		Gothenburg, Sweden	
200 m	21.90	Alemayehu Gudeta	3 March 1989	World Championships	Budapest, Hungary	
200 m	21.90	Alemayehu Gudeta	3 March 1989	World Championships	Budapest, Hungary	
400 m	46.96	Alemayehu Gudeta	5 March 1989	World Championships	Budapest, Hungary	
600 m	1:15.31	Mohammed Aman	2 February 2014	Russian Winter Meeting	Moscow, Russia	
800 m	1:44.52	Mohammed Aman	15 February 2014	Aviva Indoor Grand Prix	Birmingham, United Kingdom	
1000 m	2:18.34 OT	Yomif Kejelcha	12 January 2019	UW Indoor Preview	Seattle, United States	
1500 m	3:31.04	Samuel Tefera	16 February 2019	Birmingham Indoor Grand Prix	Birmingham, United Kingdom	
Mile	3:47.01	Yomif Kejelcha	3 March 2019	Bruce Lehane Invitational	Boston, United States	
2000 m	4:49.99	Kenenisa Bekele	17 February 2007	Aviva Indoor Grand Prix	Birmingham, United Kingdom	
3000 m	7:24.98	Getnet Wale	9 February 2021	Meeting Hauts-de-France Pas-de-Calais	Liévin, France	
3000 m	7:23.81	Lamecha Girma	15 February 2023	Meeting Hauts-de-France Pas-de-Calais	Liévin, France	
Two miles	8:04.35	Kenenisa Bekele	16 February 2008	Aviva Indoor Grand Prix	Birmingham, United Kingdom	
5000 m	12:49.60	Kenenisa Bekele	20 February 2004	Aviva Indoor Grand Prix	Birmingham, United Kingdom	
60 m hurdles						
2000 m steeplechase	5:20.03	Getahun Berhan	13 February 2011	Indoor Flanders Meeting	Ghent, Belgium	
High jump						
Pole vault						
Long jump	6.98 m (2nd jump)	Lingo Obang Ojulu	28 January 2012	Meeting International	Bordeaux, France	
Long jump	6.98 m (3rd jump)	Lingo Obang Ojulu	28 January 2012	Meeting International	Bordeaux, France	
Triple jump						
Shot put						
Heptathlon						
Heptathlon	60m / Long jump / Shot put / High jump / 60m H / Pole vault / 1000m					
5000 m walk						
4 × 400 m relay						

=== Women ===
Event	Record	Athlete	Date	Meet	Place	Ref.
60 m
60 m	12.10	Birtukan Bouele	14 April 2018	4th IAUM World Indoor Championships	Helsinki, Finland	
60 m	11.74	Birtukan Bouele	18 February 2023	Int. VLV-Hallen-Masters MS	Dornbirn, Austria	
200 m	40.87	Birtukan Bouele	15 April 2018	4th IAUM World Indoor Championships	Helsinki, Finland	
300 m	1:07.14	Birtukan Bouele	16 December 2017	Indoor Lafmeeting 1	Luxembourg, Luxembourg	
400 m
400 m	1:34.45	Birtukan Bouele	30 January 2022	BBA Hallenmeeting	Magglingen, Switzerland	
600 m	1:29.36+	Genzebe Dibaba	24 February 2017	Meeting Ville de Madrid	Madrid, Spain	
800 m	1:57.52	Gudaf Tsegay	14 February 2021	Meeting de l'Eure	Val-de-Reuil, France	
1000 m	2:33.06	Genzebe Dibaba	24 February 2017	Meeting Ville de Madrid	Madrid, Spain	
1500 m	3:53.09	Gudaf Tsegay	9 February 2021	Meeting Hauts-de-France Pas-de-Calais	Liévin, France	
Mile	4:13.31	Genzebe Dibaba	17 February 2016	Globen Galan	Stockholm, Sweden	
2000 m	5:23.75	Genzebe Dibaba	7 February 2017	Míting Internacional de Catalunya	Sabadell, Spain	
3000 m	8:16.60	Genzebe Dibaba	6 February 2014	XL Galan	Stockholm, Sweden	
Two miles	9:00.48	Genzebe Dibaba	15 February 2014	Aviva Indoor Grand Prix	Birmingham, United Kingdom	
5000 m	14:18.86	Genzebe Dibaba	19 February 2015	XL Galan	Stockholm, Sweden	
60 m hurdles						
High jump						
Pole vault						
Long jump
Long jump	2.64 m	Birtukan Bouele	14 April 2018	4th IAUM World Indoor Championships	Helsinki, Finland	
Triple jump	4.71 m	Birtukan Bouele	15 April 2018	4th IAUM World Indoor Championships	Helsinki, Finland	
Shot put
Shot put	4.20 m	Birtukan Bouele	14 April 2018	4th IAUM World Indoor Championships	Helsinki, Finland	
Shot put	4.27 m	Birtukan Bouele	18 February 2023	Int. VLV-Hallen-Masters MS	Dornbirn, Austria	
Weight throw	4.42 m	Birtukan Bouele	15 April 2018	4th IAUM World Indoor Championships	Helsinki, Finland	
Pentathlon						
Pentathlon	60m H / High jump / Shot put / Long jump / 800m					
3000 m walk	21:47.83	Birtukan Bouele	19 January 2020	Championnats 57 / Zone Alsace	Metz, France	
3000 m walk	21:03.08	Birtukan Bouele	22 January 2023	3. Stadtwerk Hallenmeeting	St. Gallen, Switzerland	
4 × 400 m relay						

== U20 (Junior) records ==
=== U20 men outdoor ===
Event	Record	Athlete	Date	Meet	Place	Age	Ref.
100 m	10.35 A (−0.2 m/s)	Biniyam Philipos	18 April 2026	Addis Ababa Grand Prix	Addis Ababa, Ethiopia		
100 m	10.35 A (−1.4 m/s)	Biniyam Philipos	29 April 2026	Ethiopian U20 Championships	Addis Ababa, Ethiopia		
200 m	20.73 A (−1.5 m/s)	Merdekiyos Wolde	28 Mar 2026	Ethiopian Athletics Championships	Addis Ababa, Ethiopia	18 years, 137 days	
400 m	45.58 A	Merdekiyos Wolde	25 Mar 2026	Ethiopian Athletics Championships	Addis Ababa, Ethiopia	18 years, 134 days	
800 m	1:42.37	Mohamed Aman	6 Sep 2013	Memorial Van Damme	Brussels, Belgium	19 years, 239 days	
1000 m	2:18.87	Tolesa Bodena	10 Jun 2018	Bauhaus Athletics	Stockholm, Sweden	18 years, 112 days	
1500 m	3:31.13	Mulugeta Wondimu	31 Jul 2004		Heusden, Belgium	19 years, 154 days	
Mile run	3:51.26	Samuel Tefera	26 May 2018	Prefontaine Classic	Eugene, United States	18 years, 215 days	
2000 m	4:56.25	Tesfaye Cheru	5 Jul 2011	Meeting Pro Athlé Tour de Reims	Reims, France	18 years, 125 days	
3000 m	7:28.19	Yomif Kejelcha	27 Aug 2016	Meeting Paris	Saint-Denis, France	19 years, 26 days	
Two miles	8:08.69	Selemon Barega	30 Jun 2019	Prefontaine Classic, Cobb Track & Angell Field	Stanford, United States	19 years, 161 days	
5000 m	12:43.02	Selemon Barega	31 Aug 2018	42nd Memorial Van Damme	Brussels, Belgium	18 years, 223 days	
5 km (road)	12:58	Kuma Girma	14 Dec 2024	Al Sharqiyah International 5KM	Al Khobar, Saudi Arabia	19 years, 20 days	
10,000 m	26:37.93	Biniam Mehary	14 Jun 2024	Ethiopian 10,000m Olympic Trials	Nerja, Spain	17 years, 177 days	
10 km (road)	26:54	Khairi Bejiga	5 Oct 2025	tRUNsylvania International 10K Brasov	Brașov, Romania	19 years, 161 days	
Half marathon	59:22	Amdework Walelegn	21 Oct 2018	AirTel Delhi Half-Marathon	New Delhi, India	19 years, 224 days	
Marathon	2:04:32	Tsegaye Mekonnen	24 Jan 2014	Standard Chartered Dubai Marathon	Dubai, United Arab Emirates	18 years, 223 days	
2000 m steeplechase	5:19.99	Meresa Kahsay	12 Jul 2013	World Youth Championships	Donetsk, Ukraine	17 years, 50 days	
3000 m steeplechase	8:01.36	Lamecha Girma	4 Oct 2019	17th IAAF World Championships	Doha, Qatar	18 years, 312 days	
110 m hurdles	14.1 h A	Henok Masreha	14 Jun 2015	Dasani Road Race	Addis Ababa, Ethiopia	17 years, 133 days	
400 m hurdles	50.71 A	Gadisa Bayu	25 May 2018	Assela Ethiopian U20 Championships	Assela, Ethiopia	18	
High jump	2.10 A	Lim Koungdoup	12 May 2019	National Championships	Addis Ababa, Ethiopia	18 years, 353 days	
Long jump	7.67 A	Lingo Obang	5 May 2011		Addis Ababa, Ethiopia	17–18 years	
Triple jump	16.23 A	Adire Gure	2 Feb 2018		Addis Ababa, Ethiopia	17 years, 316 days	
Javelin throw	73.90 A	Ukuet Gemse	3 Jul 2024	Ethiopian U20 Championships	Hawassa, Ethiopia		
20 km race walk (road)	1:21:07	Yasin Abduselam Abdulwahab	16 May 2026	African Championships	Accra, Ghana	19 years, 20 days	
4 × 400 m relay	3:11.19 A		8 Mar 2015	12th African Junior Championships	Addis Ababa, Ethiopia		

=== U20 women outdoor ===
Event	Record	Athlete	Date	Meet	Place	Age	Ref.
100 m	11.82	Tegest Tamagnu	10 Aug 2014	19th African Championships	Marrakesh, Morocco	18 years, 174 days	
200 m	23.84 A	Tegest Tamagnu	8 Mar 2015	12th African Junior Championships	Addis Ababa, Ethiopia	19 years, 19 days	
400 m	51.37	Ajayeba Aliye	13 May 2026	African Championships	Accra, Ghana	18 years, 341 days	
800 m	1:56.92	Saida Tsehaye	21 Aug 2026	Athletissima Lausanne	Lausanne, Switzerland	18 years, 45 days	
1000 m	2:37.47	Shura Hotesa	12 Jul 1996		Bellinzona, Switzerland	18–19 years	
1500 m	3:57.72	Saron Berhe	5 Jul 2025	Prefontaine Classic	Eugene, United States	17 years, 317 days	
Mile	4:22.50	Saron Berhe	4 Jul 2026	Prefontaine Classic	Eugene, United States	18 years, 316 days	
2000 m	5:34.27	Senbere Teferi	17 Jun 2014	53rd Zlatá Tretra, Golden Spike	Ostrava, Czech Republic	19 years, 45 days	
3000 m	8:29.09	Marta Alemayo	18 Jul 2026	Novuna London Athletics Meet	London, United Kingdom	18 years, 101 days	
Two miles	10:06.60	Mimi Belete	14 Sep 2007	Memorial Van Damme	Brussels, Belgium	19 years, 97 days	
5000 m	14:27.11	Chaltu Dida	6 Jun 2025	Golden Gala	Rome, Italy	18 years, 183 days	
10,000 m	30:28.82	Yenawa Nbret	11 Jun 2025	Oslo Bislett Games	Oslo, Norway	18 years, 24 days	
10 km (road)	30:21	Yenenesh Shimeket	4 Oct 2026	tRUNsylvania International 10K Brasov	Brașov, Romania	19 years, 237 days	
Half marathon	1:06:35	Wudinesh Alemu	18 October 2026	Vedanta Delhi Half Marathon	New Delhi, India	19 years, 268 days	
Marathon	2:20:59	Shure Demise	23 Jan 2015	Standard Chartered Dubai Marathon	Dubai, United Arab Emirates	19 years, 2 days	
2000 m steeplechase	6:11.83	Korahubish Itaa	10 Jul 2009	World Youth Championships	Bressanone, Italy	17 years, 132 days	
3000 m steeplechase	9:00.71	Sembo Almayew	2 Jun 2023	Golden Gala Pietro Mennea	Florence, Italy	18 years, 129 days	
100 m hurdles	14.2 h A	Meheret Ashamo	23 Dec 2021	EAF Competition	Addis Ababa, Ethiopia	17 years, 209 days	
400 m hurdles	55.64 A	Derartu Anota	28 Mar 2026	Ethiopian Athletics Championships	Addis Ababa, Ethiopia		
High jump	1.80 m	Ariyat Dibow	14 Sep 2015	11th All Africa Games, Kintele Stadium	Brazzaville, Congo	18 years, 203 days	
Long jump	5.77 m A	Aster Tolosa	9 Mar 2022	National U20 & U18 Championships	Assela, Ethiopia		
Triple jump	12.77 m A	Nibolo Uguda	11 Jun 2015		Addis Ababa, Ethiopia	18 years, 119 days	
Discus throw	42.76 m A	Merhawit Tsehaye	8 May 2019	National Championships	Addis Ababa, Ethiopia	18 years, 254 days	
Javelin throw	51.46 m A	Dngete Adola	7 Mar 2022	National U20 & U18 Championships	Assela, Ethiopia	17 years, 328 days	
20 km race walk (road)	1:31:58	Yehualeye Beletew	26 Jun 2016	African Championships	Durban, South Africa	17 years, 331 days	
4 × 400 m relay	3:39.29	Ethiopia	14 Jul 2018	17th IAAF World U20 Championships	Tampere, Finland		

=== U20 men indoor ===
Event	Record	Athlete	Date	Meet	Place	Age	Ref.
600 m	1:15.60	Mohamed Aman	3 February 2013	Russian Winter	Moscow, Russia	19 years, 24 days	
800 m	1:45.05	Mohamed Aman	21 February 2013	XL Galan	Stockholm, Sweden	19 years, 42 days	
1000 m	2:19.39	Berhanu Alemu	2 February 2001		Erfurt, Germany	18 years, 201 days	
1500 m	3:34.83	Biniam Mehary	6 February 2024	ORLEN Copernicus Cup	Toruń, Poland	17 years, 48 days	
Mile run	3:55.96	Yohanes Asmare	26 January 2024	Boston University John Thomas Terrier Classic	Boston, United States	17 years, 303 days	
2000 m	4:57.74	Yomif Kejelcha	28 February 2014	Meeting National en salle de Metz	Metz, France	16 years, 211 days	
3000 m	7:29.99	Biniam Mehary	13 February 2025	Meeting Hauts-de-France Pas-de-Calais	Liévin, France	18 years, 55 days	
Two miles	8:13.32	Tariku Bekele	18 February 2006	Norwich Union Grand Prix	Birmingham, United Kingdom	19 years, 28 days	
5000 m	13:04.18	Yitayal Atnafu	10 February 2012	PSD Bank Meeting	Düsseldorf, Germany	19 years, 21 days	

=== U20 women indoor ===
Event	Record	Athlete	Date	Meet	Place	Age	Ref.
800 m	2:01.03	Meskerem Assefa	14 February 2004		Fayetteville, United States	18 years, 147 days	
1000 m	2:40.51	Tizita Bogale	16 February 2012	Meeting Féminin du Val d'Oise	Eaubonne, France	18 years, 218 days	
1500 m	4:01.23	Saron Berhe	3 February 2026	Czech Indoor Gala	Ostrava, Czech Republic	18 years, 165 days	
Mile	4:24.10	Kalkidan Gezahegne	20 February 2010		Birmingham, Great Britain	18 years, 288 days	
2000 m	5:35.46	Dawit Seyaum	7 February 2015	New Balance Indoor Grand Prix	Boston, United States	18 years, 195 days	
3000 m	8:32.49	Senayet Getachew	4 February 2024	New Balance Indoor Grand Prix	Boston, United States	18 years, 126 days	
Two miles	9:34.03	Meseret Defar	27 January 2002		Boston, United States	18 years, 69 days	
5000 m	14:42.94	Senayet Getachew	27 January 2024	Boston University John Thomas Terrier Classic	Boston, United States	18 years, 118 days	
