= 2026 African Championships in Athletics – Men's pole vault =

Men's pole vault at the 2026 African Championships in Athletics
- Venue: Legon Sports Stadium
- Location: Accra, Ghana
- Dates: 16 May
- Competitors: 4 from 3 nations
- Winning time: 5.40

Medalists
gold medal	Valco van Wyk	South Africa
silver medal	Boubacar Diallo	Mali
bronze medal	Dhiae Cherif Boudoumi	Algeria

The men's pole vault event at the 2026 African Championships in Athletics was held on 16 May in Accra, Ghana.

== Results ==
Rank	Athlete	Nationality	Result	Notes
1st place, gold medalist(s)	Valco van Wyk	South Africa	5.40	
2nd place, silver medalist(s)	Boubacar Diallo	Mali	4.60	
3rd place, bronze medalist(s)	Dhiae Cherif Boudoumi	Algeria	4.20	
	Morne van As	South Africa	NM	
	Amar Rouana Mehdi	Algeria	DNS	
