= 2022 African Championships in Athletics – Men's pole vault =

The men's pole vault event at the 2022 African Championships in Athletics was held on 11 June in Port Louis, Mauritius.

== Results ==
Rank	Athlete	Nationality	3.50	3.70	4.20	4.50	4.60	4.70	4.80	4.90	5.00	5.20	5.30	5.40	5.42	Result	Notes
1st place, gold medalist(s)	Medhi Amar Rouana	Algeria	–	–	–	–	–	–	–	–	–	o	o	x–	xx	5.30	
2nd place, silver medalist(s)	Hichem Khalil Cherabi	Algeria	–	–	–	–	–	–	xo	–	o	o	xx–	x		5.20	
3rd place, bronze medalist(s)	Valco van Wyk	South Africa	–	–	–	xxo	–	xxo	–	xo	xxx					4.90	
4	Elmar Schutte	South Africa	–	–	–	o	–	xo	o	xxx						4.80	
5	Alexis Quest	Réunion	–	–	–	–	xxo	–	o	–	xxx					4.80	
6	Yannick Clam	Mauritius	o	xxx												3.50	
	Kareem Hussein	Egypt	–	–	xxx											NM	
	Chahata Majoli	Tunisia														DNS	
