= Silvia Kemboi =

Kenyan long-distance runner

Personal information
- Full name: Silvia Jerono Kemboi
- National team: Kenyan
- Born: 11 December 1988 (age 37)

Sport
- Country: Kenya
- Sport: Athletics
- Events: 10,000 metres walk 20 kilometres walk

Achievements and titles
- Personal bests: 10,000 m walk : 47:42.2 (2019) *20 km walk : 1:34:07 (2021)
Medal record
Women's athletics
Representing Kenya
African Championships
Silver medal – second place	2026 Accra	20 km walk
Bronze medal – third place	2022 Saint Pierre	20 km walk

Silvia Jerono Kemboi (born 11 December 1988) is a Kenyan long-distance runner who specializes in race walking. She was the bronze medallist at the African Championships in 2022 and silver in 2026.
