= Athletics at the 2003 All-Africa Games – Women's 20 kilometres walk =

The women's 20 kilometres walk at the 2003 All-Africa Games were held on October 14. This was the first women's road race walking event at the All-Africa Games replacing earlier shorter track distances.

== Results ==
| Rank | Name | Nationality | Time | Notes |
|---|---|---|---|---|
| 1st place, gold medalist(s) | Estle Viljoen | South Africa | 1:44:29 | |
| 2nd place, silver medalist(s) | Amsale Yakob | Ethiopia | 1:47:42 | |
| 3rd place, bronze medalist(s) | Natalie Fourie | South Africa | 1:48:08 | |
| 4 | Bahia Boussad | Algeria | 1:51.48 | |
| | Dounia Kara | Algeria | DQ | |
