= Athletics at the 2015 African Games – Men's pole vault =

The men's pole vault event at the 2015 African Games was held on 16 September.

== Results ==
Rank	Name	Nationality	4.70	4.80	4.90	5.00	5.10	5.20	5.25	5.30	Result	Notes
1st place, gold medalist(s)	Hichem Khalil Cherabi	Algeria	–	–	–	o	x–	o	xo	xxx	5.25	
2nd place, silver medalist(s)	Jordan Yamoah	Ghana	xxo	o	–	o	o	o	xxx		5.20	
3rd place, bronze medalist(s)	Mohamed Romdhana	Tunisia	o	–	x–	o	xxo	xxx			5.10	
4	Sami Berhayem	Tunisia	o	–	o	xxo	–	xxx			5.00	
	Calvin Dikomane	Botswana	xxx								NM	
	Peter Moreno	Nigeria									DNS	
