= Cheyne Rahme =

South African pole vaulter

Medal record

Men's athletics

Representing South Africa

African Championships
| Gold medal – first place | 2014 Marrakesh | Pole vault |

Cheyne Damon Rahme (born 23 January 1991) is a South African track and field athlete who competes in the pole vault. He holds a personal best of 5.50 m (18 ft 1/2 in), set in 2010. He was the gold medallist at the 2014 African Championships in Athletics.

The son of former national decathlon champion, Damon Rahme, Cheyne Rahme competed in the pole vault from a young age, representing South Africa at the 2007 World Youth Championships in Athletics and the 2008 World Junior Championships in Athletics. He broke the national youth record in 2007, clearing 4.92 m (16 ft 1 1/2 in). He improved this is 5.15 m (16 ft 10 3/4 in) the following year. He made his first international podium at the 2008 Commonwealth Youth Games, taking silver behind Australia's Blake Lucas. His first gold medal came at the 2009 African Junior Athletics Championships, where his victory in 5.30 m (17 ft 4 1/2 in) was a championship record.

Rahme set an African junior record in April 2010, clearing 5.50 m (18 ft 1/2 in) at the South African Junior Championships. He came close to his first senior medal later that season at the 2010 Commonwealth Games, where he was fourth behind Max Eaves.

He struggled in his first years as a senior athlete, recording a best of 5.43 m (17 ft 9 3/4 in) in 2011 and declining to 5.20 m (17 ft 1/2 in) in 2012. After missing the 2013 season, he returned in good form the year after. He ascended to the top the regional scene at the 2014 African Championships in Athletics, claiming the gold medal with a championship record of 5.41 m (17 ft 8 3/4 in). He represented the continent at the 2014 IAAF Continental Cup, coming in sixth.

He did not compete in the 2015 season.

== International competitions ==
| Year | Competition | Venue | Position | Notes |
|---|---|---|---|---|
| 2007 | World Youth Championships | Ostrava, Czech Republic | 7th | 4.75 m |
| 2008 | World Junior Championships | Bydgoszcz, Poland | 10th | 5.00 m |
| 2008 | Commonwealth Youth Games | Pune, India | 2nd | 5.20 m |
| 2009 | African Junior Championships | Bambous, Mauritius | 1st | 5.30 m CR |
| 2010 | Commonwealth Games | New Delhi, India | 4th | 5.25 m |
| 2014 | African Championships | Marrakesh, Morocco | 1st | 5.41 m CR |
| 2014 | IAAF Continental Cup | Marrakesh, Morocco | 6th | 5.20 m |

== National titles ==
- South African Athletics Championships
  - Pole vault: 2011, 2014, 2015
