= 2014 African Championships in Athletics – Men's pole vault =

The men's pole vault event at the 2014 African Championships in Athletics was held on August 13 on Stade de Marrakech.

== Results ==
Rank	Athlete	Nationality	4.00	4.20	4.60	4.70	4.80	4.90	5.00	5.05	5.10	5.41	5.55	Result	Notes
1st place, gold medalist(s)	Cheyne Rahme	South Africa	–	–	–	–	–	–	o	o	o	o	xxx	5.41	
2nd place, silver medalist(s)	Mohamed Romdhana	Tunisia	–	–	–	–	o	–	o	–	xxx			5.00	
3rd place, bronze medalist(s)	Mouhcine Cheaouri	Morocco	–	–	–	–	xo	–	o	–	xxx			5.00	
4	Hichem Cherabi	Algeria	–	–	–	–	–	xo	xxx					4.90	
5	Samir El Mafhoum	Morocco	–	–	xxo	–	o	–	xxx					4.80	
6	Rabia El Housni	Morocco	–	–	xo	xo	xxo	–	xxx					4.80	
7	Nabil Ben Sikhaled	Algeria	–	–	–	xo	xxx							4.70	
8	Juan de Swardt	South Africa	–	–	xxo	xxx								4.60	
9	Samson Basha	Ethiopia	o	xxx										4.00	
