= 2004 African Championships in Athletics – Women's 20 kilometres walk =

The women's 20 kilometres walk event at the 2004 African Championships in Athletics was held in Brazzaville, Republic of the Congo on July 15.

== Results ==
Rank	Name	Nationality	Time	Notes
1st place, gold medalist(s)	Grace Wanjiru	Kenya	1:42.45	
2nd place, silver medalist(s)	Nicolene Cronje	South Africa	1:43.57	
3rd place, bronze medalist(s)	Bahia Boussad	Algeria	1:46.12	
4	Dounia Kara-Hassoun	Algeria	1:47.26	
5	Yolène Raffin	Mauritius	1:50.49	
6	Amsale Yakob	Ethiopia	1:55.10	
7	Nagwa Ibrahim Saleh	Egypt	1:56.04	
8	Fumilay da Fonseca	São Tomé and Príncipe	2:04.06	
9	Jeanine Mandzila	Republic of the Congo	2:21.11	
	Nina Aline Tsiba	Republic of the Congo	DNF	
