= Olfa Lafi =

Tunisian race walker (born 1986)

Personal information
- Born: 16 September 1986 (age 39)

Sport
- Country: Tunisia
- Sport: Athletics
- Event: Racewalking
Medal record
Women's athletics
Representing Tunisia
African Games
Silver medal – second place	2011 Maputo	20 km walk
African Championships
Silver medal – second place	2012 Porto-Novo	20 km walk

Olfa Lafi (born 16 September 1986) is a Tunisian race walker.

== Career ==
She first competed at the 2005 African Junior Athletics Championships held in Tunis and Radès, Tunisia where she won the bronze medal in the women's 10 kilometres walk event.

In 2009, she competed in the African Race Walking Championships where she won the silver medal in the women's 20 kilometres walk.

In 2011, she won the silver medal in the women's 20 kilometres walk event at the 2011 All-Africa Games in Maputo, Mozambique.

She won a medal at the Arab Athletics Championships in the women's 10 kilometres walk on several occasions: she won the gold medal in 2013 and the silver medal both in 2009 and in 2015.

== Achievements ==
Year	Competition	Venue	Position	Event	Notes
Representing Tunisia
2005	African Junior Athletics Championships	Radès, Tunisia	3rd	10 km walk	53:53.19
2009	African Race Walking Championships	Radès, Tunisia	2nd	20 km walk	1:37:58.2
2009	Arab Athletics Championships	Damascus, Syria	2nd	10 km walk	49:45.6
2011	All-Africa Games	Maputo, Mozambique	2nd	20 km walk	1:41.25
2011	Pan Arab Games	Doha, Qatar	2nd	10 km walk	50:07.49
2012	African Championships in Athletics	Porto-Novo, Benin	2nd	20 km walk	1:46:17
2013	Arab Athletics Championships	Damascus, Syria	1st	10 km walk	50:34
2013	Mediterranean Games	Mersin, Turkey	5th	20 km walk	1:52:45
2014	African Championships in Athletics	Marrakesh, Morocco	7th	20 km walk	1:51:32
2015	Arab Athletics Championships	Isa Town, Bahrain	2nd	10 km walk	50:45.9
