= 2018 African Championships in Athletics – Men's pole vault =

The men's pole vault event at the 2018 African Championships in Athletics was held on 4 August in Asaba, Nigeria.

== Results ==
Rank	Athlete	Nationality	4.10	4.20	4.70	4.80	4.90	5.00	5.10	5.20	5.25	Result	Notes
1st place, gold medalist(s)	Mohamed Amine Romdhana	Tunisia	–	–	–	x–	o	o	o	o	xxx	5.20	
2nd place, silver medalist(s)	Valko van Wyk	South Africa	–	–	–	xo	o	o	o	xxx		5.10	
3rd place, bronze medalist(s)	Mejdi Chehata	Tunisia	–	–	o	x–	xo	xo	xxo	xxx		5.10	
4	Ekhardt van der Watt	South Africa	–	–	o	o	o	xxx				4.90	
5	Samson Basha	Ethiopia	xo	xxx								4.10	
	Hichem Cherabi	Algeria	–	–	x–	xx						NM	
