= 2002 African Championships in Athletics – Women's 10 kilometres walk =

The women's 10 kilometres walk event at the 2002 African Championships in Athletics was held in Radès, Tunisia on August 7.

== Results ==
Rank	Name	Nationality	Time	Notes
1st place, gold medalist(s)	Nagwa Ibrahim Saleh Ali	Egypt	49:26	
2nd place, silver medalist(s)	Bahia Boussad	Algeria	49:57	
3rd place, bronze medalist(s)	Grace Wanjiru	Kenya	51:35	
4	Dounia Mimouni	Algeria	52:36	
5	Thouraya Hamrouni	Tunisia	56:18	
	Zufan Tadesse	Ethiopia	DNS	
