= Bariza Ghezelani =

Algerian racewalker

Bariza Ghezlani otherwise known as Bariza Ghazlani, Bariza Ghezelani or Bariza Ghozlani, (born 16 September 1993) is an Algerian racewalker. She is a two-tie winner of the Algerian 20 kilometres race walk cup (2014 and 2015) and won two medals at the Arab Athletics Championships.

She trains at the Association sportive de la sûreté nationale (National Security Sports Association).

== International competitions ==
Year	Competition	Venue	Position	Event	Notes
2012	World Junior Championships	Barcelona, Spain	32nd	10,000 m walk	53:30.36
2013	Arab Championships	Doha, Qatar	2nd	10 km walk	57:41
2015	Arab Championships	Isa Town, Bahrain	3rd	10 km walk	54:15.4
2016	African Championships	Durban, South Africa	7th	20 km walk	1:46:33
2019	Arab Championships	Cairo, Egypt	3rd	10 km walk	50:00

== Circuit wins ==
- Grand Prix International de marche: 2013
- Open championship of Algeria "Tayeb Mghezzi": 2013
- Algerian Race Walking Cup: 2014, 2015

== Personal bests ==
- 10 km race walk : 50:41.36 min (2015)
