= Athletics at the 2023 African Games – Women's 20 kilometres walk =

The women's 20 kilometres walk event at the 2023 African Games was held on 20 March 2024 in Accra, Ghana. Due to officials error, some athletes only completed 19 kilometres of the course while others the whole distance. It was decided to use the placings at the 19 kilometre to decide medals.

== Results ==
Rank	Name	Nationality	Time	Penalties	Notes
1st place, gold medalist(s)	Emily Ngii	Kenya	NT		
2nd place, silver medalist(s)	Sintayehu Masire	Ethiopia	NT		
3rd place, bronze medalist(s)	Souad Azzi	Algeria	1:45:42		
4	Sylvia Kemboi	Kenya	NT		
5	Jessica Groenewald	South Africa	1:49:17		
6	Wubalem Shugute	Ethiopia	1:56:36	~~~	
7	Nesrine Mejri	Tunisia	1:56:47	~~~	
8	Beatrice Hamidou Tayki'oo	Cameroon	NT		
9	Alem Tafes	Ethiopia	2:07:46		
10	Melissa Touloum	Algeria	NT	>	
