= Hichem Khalil Cherabi =

Algerian pole vaulter (born 1993)

Medal record

Men's athletics

Representing Algeria

African Games
Gold medal – first place	2015 Brazzaville	Pole vault
Gold medal – first place	2019 Rabat	Pole vault

African Championships
Gold medal – first place	2016 Durban	Pole vault
Silver medal – second place	2022 Mauritius	Pole vault

Hichem Khalil Cherabi (Arabic: هشام خليل شرابي; born 30 March 1993) is an Algerian track and field athlete who competes in the pole vault. He is the Algerian record holder for the event with his personal best of 5.50 m (18 ft 1/2 in). In June 2015 he improved Lakhdar Rahal's national record of 5.34 m which had stood since 1979.

He began his international career in 2014 and placed fourth at the 2014 African Championships in Athletics. His first international medal came at the 2015 Arab Athletics Championships, where he took the bronze. Cherabi established himself as the continent's best vaulter with gold medal wins at the 2015 African Games and 2016 African Championships in Athletics. He was the top ranked African pole vaulter in 2015.

== International competitions ==
Year	Competition	Venue	Position	Event	Notes
2014	African Championships	Marrakesh, Morocco	4th	Pole vault	4.90 m
2015	Arab Championships	Isa Town, Bahrain	3rd	Pole vault	4.80 m
2015	African Games	Brazzaville, Republic of the Congo	1st	Pole vault	5.25 m
2016	African Championships	Durban, South Africa	1st	Pole vault	5.30 m
2017	Islamic Solidarity Games	Baku, Azerbaijan	3rd	Pole vault	5.25 m
2018	African Championships	Asaba, Nigeria	–	Pole vault	NM
2019	Arab Championships	Cairo, Egypt	2nd	Pole vault	5.10 m
2019	African Games	Rabat, Morocco	1st	Pole vault	5.00 m
2021	Arab Championships	Radès, Tunisia	4th	Pole vault	5.10 m
2022	African Championships	Port Louis, Mauritius	2nd	Pole vault	5.20 m
2022	Islamic Solidarity Games	Konya, Turkey	–	Pole vault	NM
