= 2026 African Championships in Athletics – Women's 20 kilometres walk =

Women's 20 kilometres walk at the 2026 African Championships in Athletics
- Location: Accra, Ghana
- Dates: 16 May
- Competitors: 8 from 4 nations
- Winning time: 1:33:31

Medalists
gold medal	Wubalem Shugut	Ethiopia
silver medal	Silvia Kemboi	Kenya
bronze medal	Souad Azzi	Algeria

The women's 20 kilometres walk event at the 2026 African Championships in Athletics was held on 16 May in Accra, Ghana.

== Results ==
Rank	Athlete	Nationality	Time	Notes
1st place, gold medalist(s)	Wubalem Shugute	Ethiopia	1:33:31	
2nd place, silver medalist(s)	Silvia Kemboi	Kenya	1:33:44	
3rd place, bronze medalist(s)	Souad Azzi	Algeria	1:34:28	
4	Hiwot Ambaw	Ethiopia	1:36:47	
5	Caren Naliaka Simiyu	Kenya	1:43:26	
6	Zelda Botha	South Africa	1:44:20	
7	Melissa Touloum	Algeria	1:45:12	
8	Mare Betwe	Ethiopia	1:47:50	
