= Adisu Girma =

Ethiopian athlete

Personal information
- Nationality: Ethiopian
- Born: 10 December 1999 (age 26)

Sport
- Sport: Athletics
- Event(s): 1500m, 3000m, 5000m

Achievements and titles
- Personal best(s): 800m 1:46.36 (Hengalo, 2019); 1500m: 3:34.71 (Bydgoszcz, 2023); 3000m: 7:45.47 (Paris, 2023)
Medal record
Men's athletics
Representing Ethiopia
African Junior Championships
Bronze medal – third place	2017 Tlemcen	800 m

Adisu Girma (born 10 December 1999) is an Ethiopian track and field athlete. He won the 800 metres at the 2019 Ethiopian Athletics Championships.

== Career ==
Adisu Girma won a bronze medal in the 800 metres at the 2017 African U20 Championships in Athletics in Tlemcen, Algeria. The following year he finished fourth at the 2018 World Athletics U20 Championships in Tampere in the 800 metres. He won the 800 metres at the 2019 Ethiopian Athletics Championships.

In January 2021 he won the Ethiopian Olympic trial competition over 800 metres in Addis Ababa. Girma won the Barcelona 5 km road race on 31 December 2022.

In 2023, he set a new personal best in the 1500m of 3:34.71 in Bydgoszcz on 6 June 2023. Latter that month he also set a new 3000m personal best, clocking a time of 7:45.47 at the Diamond League event in Paris. He was selected for the Ethiopia team for the 2023 World Athletics Championships.
