= 2015 World Youth Championships in Athletics – Girls' 5000 metres walk =

Girls' 5000 metres walk at the 2015 World Youth Championships in Athletics
- Venue: Estadio Olímpico Pascual Guerrero
- Dates: 18 July
- Competitors: 35 from 22 nations
- Winning time: 22:41.08

Medalists
gold medal	Ma Zhenxia	China
silver medal	Olga Eliseeva	Russia
bronze medal	Ayalnesh Dejene	Ethiopia

The girls' 5000 metres walk at the 2015 World Youth Championships in Athletics was held at the Estadio Olímpico Pascual Guerrero in Cali, Colombia on 18 July 2015.

== Records ==
Prior to the competition, the following records were as follows.

World Youth Best	Tatyana Kalmykova (RUS)	20:28.05	Ostrava, Czech Republic	12 July 2007
Championship Record	Tatyana Kalmykova (RUS)	20:28.05	Ostrava, Czech Republic	12 July 2007
World Youth Leading	Yana Smerdova (RUS)	22:13	Sochi, Russia	28 February 2015

== Results ==
Rank	Name	Nationality	Time	Note
1st place, gold medalist(s)	Ma Zhenxia	China	22:41.08	SB
2nd place, silver medalist(s)	Olga Eliseeva	Russia	22:45.09	
3rd place, bronze medalist(s)	Ayalnesh Dejene	Ethiopia	22:48.25	PB
4	Xue Ke	China	23:01.68	PB
5	Valeria Ortuño	Mexico	23:01.90	SB
6	Ayşe Tekdal	Turkey	23:14.82	PB
7	Clara Smith	Australia	23:22.36	
8	María Montoya	Colombia	23:43.40	
9	Evelyn Inga	Peru	23:45.61	PB
10	Maika Yagi	Japan	23:46.47	PB
11	Jemima Montag	Australia	23:46.57	
12	Margarita Kolesnichenko	Russia	23:53.64	
13	Leyde Guerra	Peru	23:54.70	PB
14	Eloïse Terrec	France	24:07.64	
15	Athanasía Vaítsi	Greece	24:07.66	PB
16	Arely Morales	Guatemala	24:24.42	
17	Teresa Zurek	Germany	24:25.27	PB
18	Lina Bolívar	Colombia	24:30.98	
19	Yehualeye Beletew	Ethiopia	24:49.83	
20	Dímitra Bohóri	Greece	24:50.78	
21	Emilia Gręziak	Poland	24:56.22	
22	Antía Chamosa	Spain	24:59.41	
23	Kim Chae-hyun	South Korea	25:06.67	SB
24	Vanessa Tomei	Italy	25:20.22	
25	Irene Vázquez	Spain	25:20.24	
26	Yukako Hayashi	Japan	25:22.47	PB
27	Carolina Costa	Portugal	25:59.63	
28	Julia Richter	Germany	26:03.08	PB
29	Gabriela Siminiceanu	Romania	26:04.47	
30	Yekaterina Shlykova	Kazakhstan	26:06.95	
31	Anastasia Sanzana	Chile	26:32.43	
32	Ema Hačundová	Slovakia	26:43.96	
33	Meral Kurt	Turkey	26:46.98	
–	Agata Kowalska	Poland	DNF	
–	Anthea Mirabello	Italy	DNF	
