= Athletics at the 1999 All-Africa Games – Women's 10 kilometres walk =

Athletics at the 1999 All-Africa Games
Track events
100 m	men	women
200 m	men	women
400 m	men	women
800 m	men	women
1500 m	men	women
5000 m	men	women
10,000 m	men	women
100 m hurdles		women
110 m hurdles	men
400 m hurdles	men	women
3000 m steeplechase	men
4×100 m relay	men	women
4×400 m relay	men	women
Road events
Marathon	men	women
10 km walk		women
20 km walk	men
Field events
High jump	men	women
Pole vault	men	women
Long jump	men	women
Triple jump	men	women
Shot put	men	women
Discus throw	men	women
Hammer throw	men	women
Javelin throw	men	women
Combined events
Heptathlon		women
Decathlon	men

The women's 20 kilometres walk event at the 1999 All-Africa Games was held in the streets of Johannesburg.

== Results ==
Rank	Name	Nationality	Time	Notes
1st place, gold medalist(s)	Susan Vermeulen	South Africa	49:33	GR
2nd place, silver medalist(s)	Nagwa Ibrahim Ali	Egypt	50:19	
3rd place, bronze medalist(s)	Bahia Boussad	Algeria	51:31	
4	Anne Hortense Ebéna	Cameroon	52:23	
5	Donyazad Mimouni	Algeria	52:57	
6	Yolène Raffin	Mauritius	58:30	
	Elizabeth Aklilu	Ethiopia	DQ	
	Gete Koma	Ethiopia	DQ	
