= Athletics at the 2019 African Games – Men's pole vault =

The men's pole vault event at the 2019 African Games was held on 29 August in Rabat.

== Results ==
Rank	Name	Nationality	3.00	3.20	3.40	4.25	4.70	4.90	5.00	5.25	Result	Notes
1st place, gold medalist(s)	Hichem Khalil Cherabi	Algeria	–	–	–	–	–	–	xo	xxx	5.00	
2nd place, silver medalist(s)	Mejdi Chehata	Tunisia	–	–	–	–	o	xxx			4.70	
3rd place, bronze medalist(s)	Larbi Bourrada	Algeria	–	–	–	o	xo	xxx			4.70	
4	Samuel Osadolor	Nigeria	xo	xx–	x						3.00	
