= 2008 African Championships in Athletics – Women's 20 kilometres walk =

The women's 20 kilometres walk event at the 2008 African Championships in Athletics was held on May 4.

== Results ==
Rank	Name	Nationality	Time	Notes
1st place, gold medalist(s)	Grace Wanjiru	Kenya	1:39:50	
2nd place, silver medalist(s)	Asnakech Ararsa	Ethiopia	1:40:12	
3rd place, bronze medalist(s)	Mary Njoki	Kenya	1:41:15	
4	Ruzaan Harris	South Africa	1:41:33	
5	Tigist Bedlu	Ethiopia	1:41:44	
6	Bahia Boussad	Algeria	1:41:53	
7	Rahma El Mahmoudi	Tunisia	1:42:55	
8	Chaima Trabelsi	Tunisia	1:43:54	
9	Bekashign Aynalem	Ethiopia	1:46:08	
10	Nomsa Buthelezi	South Africa	1:52:44	
11	Michelle Hopkins	South Africa	1:52:50	
	Ghania Amzal	Algeria	DNF	
