= 2016 African Championships in Athletics – Men's pole vault =

The men's pole vault event at the 2016 African Championships in Athletics was held on 25 June in Kings Park Stadium.

== Results ==
Rank	Athlete	Nationality	Result	Notes
1st place, gold medalist(s)	Hichem Khalil Cherabi	Algeria	5.30	
2nd place, silver medalist(s)	Mohamed Romdhana	Tunisia	5.20	
3rd place, bronze medalist(s)	Jordan Yamoah	Ghana	5.00	
4	Heinrich Smit	South Africa	4.80	
	Eben Beukes	South Africa	NM	
	Samson Basha	Ethiopia	NM	
	Michael Cilliers	South Africa	DNS	
