= Athletics at the 2007 All-Africa Games – Women's 20 kilometres walk =

The women's 20 kilometres walk event at the 2007 All-Africa Games was held on July 19.

== Results ==
Rank	Name	Nationality	Time	Notes
1st place, gold medalist(s)	Cheima Trabelsi	Tunisia	1:49:13	
2nd place, silver medalist(s)	Mercy Njoki	Kenya	1:49:18	
3rd place, bronze medalist(s)	Asnakch Ararissa	Ethiopia	1:49:29	
4	Ghania Amzal	Algeria	1:49:39	
5	Bahia Boussad	Algeria	1:51:56	
6	Ruzaan Harris	South Africa	1:52.36	
7	Grace Wanjiru	Kenya	1:52.53	
8	Nagwa Ebrahim Aly	Egypt	1:53.19	
9	Bekashien Aynalem	Ethiopia	1:54.23	
10	Rahma El Mahmoudi	Tunisia	1:55.36	
11	Yolène Raffin	Mauritius	1:56.45	
12	Hakima Embarek	Algeria	2:01.07	
13	Nomsa Buthelezi	South Africa	2:01.32	
14	Kafayat Bubalola	Nigeria	2:02.18	
15	Queensly Asedo	Nigeria	2:03.45	
	Nicole Cronje	South Africa	DQ	
