= 1994 Arab Junior Athletics Championships =

Youth athletics tournament

6th Arab Junior Athletics Championships
- Host city: Tunis, Tunisia
- Events: 42

The 1994 Arab Junior Athletics Championships was the sixth edition of the international athletics competition for under-20 athletes from Arab countries. It took place in Tunis, Tunisia. Qatar, after a good performance in 1992, did not send a team to the competition. A total of 42 athletics events were contested, 23 for men and 19 for women.

The women's 10,000 metres was restored to the programme after a break in 1992. A women's triple jump was contested for the first time. The men's 20 km road race made its third and final appearance at the championships, as junior road events were largely dropped from international competitions. The men's hurdles finals were only recorded to the tenth of a second due to technical limitations. Wind affected parts of the competition, particularly the 200 metres races and the horizontal jumps.

In line with increased participation, the standard of performers at this event improved. Hadi Soua'an Al-Somaily won a men's hurdles double for Saudi Arabia and won multiple Asian titles as a senior. Ali Hakimi defended his 1500 metres title and added the 800 metres crown; he was an Olympic finalist two years later. Younès Moudrik took the men's long jump title – an event he would win twice at the African Championships in Athletics. Seventeen-year-old Abderrahmane Hammad was runner-up in the high jump but later became the first Arab to win a medal in the high jump at the Olympics.

On the women's side, Fatma Lanouar won the 800 metres in Tunis and was a two-time Mediterranean Games champion as a senior. The runner-up in that event, 16-year-old Hasna Benhassi of Morocco, had even greater success in her career, which included two Olympic and two World Championships medals. Future African champion Aïda Sellam of Tunisia won the javelin throw and a shot put bronze medal on home turf. The winner of the women's walk, Nagwa Ibrahim Ali, would become a prominent athlete in her discipline regionally, with three African titles to her name.

== Medal summary ==
=== Men ===
Event	Gold		Silver		Bronze	
100 metres	Yacine Djellil (ALG)	10.88	Mohammed Masoud Salem (KSA)	11.10	Wisam Bouaïcha (TUN)	11.13
200 metres (wind: +2.8 m/s)	Yacine Djellil (ALG)	21.33w	Mohammed Al-Beshi (KSA)	21.58w	Talal Jataili (KUW)	22.15w
400 metres	Adem Hecini (ALG)	47.22	Mohammed Al-Beshi (KSA)	47.44	Machaal Harbi (KUW)	48.80
800 metres	Ali Hakimi (TUN)	1:52.4	Lamine Alaoui (TUN)	1:54.2	Faraj Al-Shahrani (KSA)	1:55.0
1500 metres	Ali Hakimi (TUN)	4:06.16	Yarba Lakhal (MAR)	4:08.14	Rachid Amor (TUN)	4:08.33
5000 metres	Salah El Ghazi (MAR)	14:14.21	Mehdi Khelifi (TUN)	14:16.96	Mohammed Amyn (MAR)	14:17.73
10,000 metres	Salah El Ghazi (MAR)	30:15.0 CR	Abdellah Maarouf (MAR)	30:23.2	Mehdi Khelifi (TUN)	30:30.1
110 m hurdles	Hadi Soua'an Al-Somaily (KSA)	14.1 =CR	Samir Bouabcha (ALG)	14.8	Nasser Abdulrazak (KUW)	15.0
400 m hurdles	Hadi Soua'an Al-Somaily (KSA)	51.3 CR	Hassan Kirmasi (MAR)	53.8	Alawi El Kacimi (MAR)	54.5
3000 metres steeplechase	Yarba Lakhal (MAR)	8:43.08 CR	Hédi Khalfallah (TUN)	8:57.67	Hussain Ali Al-Asmari (KSA)	9:07.99
4 × 100 m relay	Algeria (ALG)	41.27 CR	Saudi Arabia (KSA)	41.45	Morocco (MAR)	42.70
4 × 400 m relay	Saudi Arabia (KSA)	3:12.6	Algeria (ALG)	3:16.6	Morocco (MAR)	3:20.8
20 km road race	Abdellah Maarouf (MAR)	1:05:18	Aziz Darwish (MAR)	1:05:25	Mohammed Al-Okadi (KSA)	1:06:17
10,000 m walk	Lounès Méhadi (ALG)	45:18.90 CR	Younès Aouanouk (ALG)	48:31.91	Hatab Latifi (TUN)	49:39.70
High jump	Hassan Darwish Mahmoud (EGY)	2.10 m =CR	Abderrahmane Hammad (ALG)	2.07 m	Ramzi Chebaane (TUN)	2.01 m
Pole vault	Khalid Lachheb (MAR)	5.05 m CR	Rafik Mefti (ALG)	4.65 m	Mohamed Benyahia (ALG)	4.20 m
Long jump	Younès Moudrik (MAR)	7.55 m CR	Nabil Adamou (ALG)	7.44 m w	Djamel Smichet (ALG)	7.34 m w
Triple jump	Djamel Smichet (ALG)	15.48 m	Khalid Al-Farhan (KUW)	15.19 m	Nabil Adamou (ALG)	15.03 m
Shot put	Walid Jamal Mustafa (EGY)	15.47 m	Mohammed Tahnoun (KUW)	14.19 m	Hisham Mohamed El Ashmawi (EGY)	13.89 m
Discus throw	Walid Jamal Mustafa (EGY)	46.74 m CR	Hisham Mohamed El Ashmawi (EGY)	45.74 m	Abderrazak Yahiaoui (ALG)	42.82 m
Hammer throw	Mohamed Karim Horchani (TUN)	62.10 m	Zaki Bounab (ALG)	54.96 m	Adel Maatouk (KUW)	51.92 m
Javelin throw	Ali Saleh Al-Jadani (KSA)	69.32 m	Firas Zaal Al-Mohammed (SYR)	62.96 m	Chemseddine Belhadj Amor (TUN)	62.88 m
Decathlon	Abdul Marzouk Al-Shahrani (KSA)	6710 pts CR	Ali Dahan (SYR)	6397 pts	Mohamed Halima Mansour (ALG)	6166 pts

=== Women ===
Event	Gold		Silver		Bronze	
100 metres	Saliha Hammadi (ALG)	12.08 CR	Ahlem Allali (ALG)	12.62	Sihem Fellah (TUN)	12.77
200 metres (wind: +3.2 m/s)	Amina Belkrouchi (MAR)	24.76w	Ahlem Allali (ALG)	25.04w	Sihem Fellah (TUN)	25.32w
400 metres	Amina Belkrouchi (MAR)	57.45	Nahida Touhami (ALG)	58.54	Hanène Bakr (TUN)	59.38
800 metres	Fatma Lanouar (TUN)	2:13.97	Hasna Benhassi (MAR)	2:14.67	Kheïra Arfa (ALG)	2:15.44
1500 metres	Hanène Abassi (TUN)	4:38.46	Sabah Safou (MAR)	4:39.65	Fatma Lanouar (TUN)	4:39.76
3000 metres	Sabah Safou (MAR)	10:00.83	Hind Chahid (MAR)	10:07.48	Rim Dabou (TUN)	10:11.27
10,000 metres	Fatiha Killech (MAR)	37:46.76 CR	Soulef Bouguerra (TUN)	39:16.56	Samah Wamas (TUN)	41:11.21
100 m hurdles	Sana Drid (TUN)	15.30	Hella Ezzaier (TUN)	15.38	Leïla Bougerra (ALG)	16.12
400 m hurdles	Amina Belkrouchi (MAR)	60.88	Amani Abderrahim Belal (EGY)	65.88	Naïma Khafak (ALG)	65.99
4 × 100 m relay	Algeria (ALG)	48.75	Tunisia (TUN)	49.32	Egypt (EGY)	51.71
4 × 400 m relay	Tunisia (TUN)	4:00.20	Algeria (ALG)	4:02.39	Egypt (EGY)	4:10.59
5000 m walk	Nagwa Ibrahim Ali (EGY)	25:54.76 CR	Nadia El Aouni (MAR)	27:18.01	Sonia Farjaoui (TUN)	28:23.98
High jump	Rym Selma Achour (TUN)	1.66 m CR	Souheir Ben Romdhane (TUN)	1.60 m	Souad Bouchabka (ALG)	1.55 m
Long jump	Sana Drid (TUN)	5.56 m w	Mouna Hammami (TUN)	5.53 m w	Rania Abdel Aziz Ahmed (EGY)	4.83 m w
Triple jump	Mouna Hammami (TUN)	11.71 m	Hella Ezzaier (TUN)	11.55 m	Souad Chouikha (ALG)	10.97 m
Shot put	Iman Hassan Mahrous (EGY)	12.58 m CR	Malika Hammou (ALG)	11.79 m	Aïda Sellam (TUN)	11.36 m
Discus throw	Nasrine Dahman (TUN)	39.14 m	Saadia Amloud (MAR)	38.20 m	Malika Hammou (ALG)	35.52 m
Javelin throw	Aïda Sellam (TUN)	44.92 m CR	Malika Hammou (ALG)	41.60 m	Nahed Ben Saïd (TUN)	36.12 m
Heptathlon	Sana Drid (TUN)	4406 pts CR	Hamida Rahouli (ALG)	4388 pts	Saïda Ahmani (ALG)	3997 pts

== Medal table ==
Rank	Nation	Gold	Silver	Bronze	Total
1	Tunisia (TUN)	13	9	15	37
2	Morocco (MAR)	11	9	4	24
3	Algeria (ALG)	8	14	12	34
4	Saudi Arabia (KSA)	5	4	3	12
5	Egypt (EGY)	5	2	4	11
6	Kuwait (KUW)	0	2	4	6
7	Syria (SYR)	0	2	0	2
Totals (7 entries)		42	42	42	126
