= Aynalem Eshetu =

Ethiopian race walker (born 1992)

Aynalem Eshetu Shefrawe
Personal information
- Nationality: Ethiopia
- Born: 5 February 1992 (age 34)

Sport
- Sport: Athletics
- Event: 20 km walk
Medal record
Women's athletics
Representing Ethiopia
African Games
Silver medal – second place	2015 Brazzaville	20 km walk
Bronze medal – third place	2011 Maputo	20 km walk
African Championships
Bronze medal – third place	2010 Nairobi	20 km walk
Bronze medal – third place	2012 Porto-Novo	20 km walk
- Updated on 26 August 2016

Aynalem Eshetu Shefrawe (born 5 February 1992) is an Ethiopian race walker. She has won multiple medals on a continental level.

She currently holds several national records at various distances.

== Competition record ==
Year	Competition	Venue	Position	Event	Notes
Representing Ethiopia
2009	World Youth Championships	Brixen, Italy	13th	5000 m walk	24:13.29
2010	African Championships	Nairobi, Kenya	3rd	20 km walk	1:41:46
2011	African Junior Championships	Gaborone, Botswana	1st	20 km walk	22:59.19
2011	All-Africa Games	Maputo, Mozambique	3rd	20 km walk	1:42:19
2012	African Championships	Porto-Novo, Benin	3rd	20 km walk	1:49:45
2015	African Games	Brazzaville, Republic of the Congo	2nd	20 km walk	1:39:49
2016	African Championships	Durban, South Africa	–	20 km walk	DNF
2018	African Championships	Asaba, Nigeria	5th	20 km walk	1:42:40
2019	African Games	Rabat, Morocco	8th	20 km walk	1:44:41

== Personal bests ==
- 5000 metres walk – 24:13.29 (Bressanone 2009)
- 10,000 metres walk – 49:00.6 (Addis Ababa 2011)
- 20 kilometres walk – 1:39:49 (Brazzaville 2015)
