= Valco van Wyk =

South African pole vaulter (born 2000)

Personal information
- Born: 26 July 2000 (age 26)

Sport
- Country: South Africa
- Sport: Athletics
- Event: Pole vault
Medal record
Men's athletics
Representing South Africa
African Championships
Gold medal – first place	2026 Accra	Pole vault
Bronze medal – third place	2022 Mauritius	Pole vault

Valco van Wyk (born 26 February 2000) is a South African athlete. He is a multiple-time national champion in the pole vault and was the gold medalist the 2026 African Championships in Athletics.

== Biography ==
Van Wyk studied for a Bachelor of Health Sciences in Sport Coaching and Human Movement Sciences student at North-West University. He represented South Africa at the 2018 IAAF World U20 Championships in Tampere, and won the gold medal in the pole vault at the 2019 African U20 Championships the following year in Abidjan.

In June 2022, he was a medalists in the pole vault at the 2022 African Championships in Athletics in Mauritius.

In 2026, he won at the USSA Championships in pole vault. In April 2026, he became senior national champion for the seventh time at the South Africa Athletics Championships, clearing a height of 5.10m. In May, he won the gold medal at the 2026 African Championships in Athletics.
