= Mohamed Romdhana =

Tunisian pole vaulter (born 1993)

Mohamed Amin Romdhana
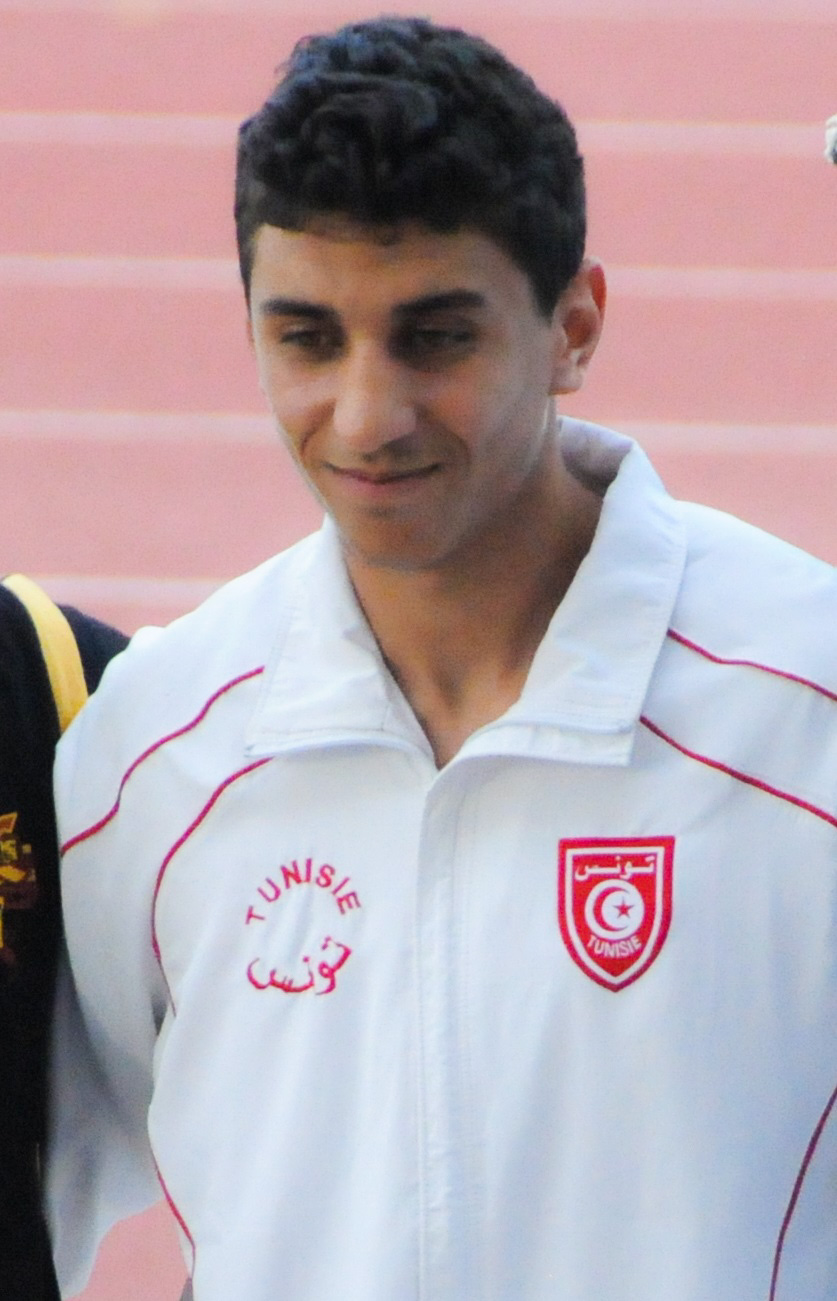

Personal information
- Born: 27 January 1993 (age 33) Bizerte, Tunisia
- Education: Institut of sports and education Ksar said Tunis
- Height: 176 cm (5 ft 9 in)
- Weight: 72 kg (159 lb)

Sport
- Sport: Athletics
- Event: Pole vault
Medal record
Men's athletics
Representing Tunisia
African Championships
Gold medal – first place	2018 Asaba	Pole vault
Silver medal – second place	2014 Marrakesh	Pole vault
Silver medal – second place	2016 Durban	Pole vault

Mohamed Amin Romdhana (Arabic: محمد أمين رمضانة; born 27 January 1993) is a Tunisian athlete specialising in the pole vault. He has won multiple medals at continental level, including three at African Championships and one at the African Games, and twice represented Africa at the Continental Cup.

His personal bests in the event are 5.40 metres outdoors (Radés 2017) and 5.35 metres indoors (Niort 2017). Both are current national records.

== International competitions ==
Year	Competition	Venue	Position	Notes
Representing Tunisia
2013	Islamic Solidarity Games	Palembang, Indonesia	3rd	4.90 m
2014	African Championships	Marrakesh, Morocco	2nd	5.00 m
2014	Continental Cup	Marrakesh, Morocco	8th	5.00 m^{1}
2015	Arab Championships	Isa Town, Bahrain	2nd	4.90 m
2015	African Games	Brazzaville, Republic of the Congo	3rd	5.10 m
2016	African Championships	Durban, South Africa	2nd	5.20 m
2017	Islamic Solidarity Games	Baku, Azerbaijan	2nd	5.30 m
2017	Arab Championships	Radès, Tunisia	2nd	5.20 m
2017	Francophonie Games	Abidjan, Ivory Coast	4th	5.20 m
2018	African Championships	Asaba, Nigeria	1st	5.20 m
2018	Continental Cup	Ostrava, Czech Republic	7th	4.90 m^{1}

^{1}Representing Africa
