= 2012 African Championships in Athletics – Men's pole vault =

The men's pole vault at the 2012 African Championships in Athletics was held at the Stade Charles de Gaulle on 30 June.

== Medalists ==
Gold	Mouhcine Cheaouri; Morocco
Silver	Samir El Mafhoum; Morocco
Bronze	Ruan Van Wyk; South Africa

== Records ==
Standing records prior to the 2012 African Championships in Athletics
World record	Sergey Bubka (UKR)	6.14	Sestriere, Italy	31 July 1994
African record	Okkert Brits (RSA)	6.03	Cologne, Germany	18 August 1995
Championship record	Okkert Brits (RSA)	5.40	Durban, South Africa	1993
Championship record	Okkert Brits (RSA)	5.40	Dakar, Senegal	21 August 1998

== Schedule ==
Date	Time	Round
30 June 2012	14:40	Final

== Results ==
=== Final ===
Rank	Athlete	Nationality	4.30	4.40	4.40	4.60	4.70	4.80	4.90	5.00	5.05	5.10	5.30	Result	Notes
1st place, gold medalist(s)	Mouhcine Cheaouri	Morocco	–	–	–	–	–	xo	–	o	–	xxo	xxx	5.10	
2nd place, silver medalist(s)	Samir El Mafhoum	Morocco	–	o	–	o	–	o	xo	o	–	xxx		5.00	
3rd place, bronze medalist(s)	Ruan Van Wyk	South Africa	–	–	–	–	o	o	o	xxx				4.90	
4	Heinrich Smit	South Africa	–	–	–	–	o	–	xxo	xxx				4.90	
5	Sami Berrhaiem	Tunisia	–	o	–	–	xo	–	xxx					4.70	
6	Eben Beukes	South Africa	–	–	–	–	xxo	–	xxx					4.70	
	Larbi Bouraada	Algeria												DNS	
	Mourad Souissi	Algeria												DNS	
	Guillaume Thierry	Mauritius												DNS	
	Ahmed Hamed	Egypt												DNS	
