= Grace Wanjiru =

Kenyan race walker

Grace Wanjirū Njue
Personal information
- Nationality: Kenya
- Born: 10 January 1979 (age 47) Embu, Kenya
- Height: 1.54 m (5 ft 1 in)
- Weight: 41 kg (90 lb)

Sport
- Sport: Athletics
- Event: 20 km walk
Medal record
Women's athletics
Representing Kenya
Commonwealth Games
Bronze medal – third place	2010 Delhi	20 km walk
African Games
Gold medal – first place	2015 Brazzaville	20 km walk
Silver medal – second place	2019 Rabat	20 km walk
African Championships
Gold medal – first place	2004 Brazzaville	20 km walk
Gold medal – first place	2008 Addis Ababa	20 km walk
Gold medal – first place	2010 Nairobi	20 km walk
Gold medal – first place	2012 Porto-Novo	20 km walk
Gold medal – first place	2014 Marrakesh	20 km walk
Gold medal – first place	2016 Durban	20 km walk
Silver medal – second place	2018 Asaba	20 km walk
Bronze medal – third place	2002 Tunis	10 km walk
- Updated on 26 August 2016

Grace Wanjirū Njue (born 1979) is a Kenyan race walker. She is a three-time African Champion and a Commonwealth Games medallist.

Wanjirū set a 20 Kilometres race walk African Record when she won the event at the 2010 African Championships clocking 1:34:19 hours. The previous record (1:36:18) was held by Susan Vermeulen of South Africa and set in 1999. Wanjirū was already the reigning Kenyan record (time 1:39.50) holder, setting it when she won the 2008 African Championships title. Previously in 2004, she had set a new 20 kilometers national record (1:41:00) in Nairobi.

Later in 2010 she won bronze medal at the 2010 Commonwealth Games.

She is also a multiple-time national champion. In 2011, she won 20 kilometers race walk at the national championships once again setting another African record of 1:28:15

== Achievements ==
Year	Competition	Venue	Position	Event	Notes
Representing Kenya
2002	African Championships	Tunis, Tunisia	3rd	10 km walk	51:35
2004	African Championships	Brazzaville, Republic of the Congo	1st	20 km walk	1:42:45
2007	All-Africa Games	Algiers, Algeria	7th	20 km walk	1:52.53
2008	African Championships	Addis Ababa, Ethiopia	1st	20 km walk	1:39:50
2010	African Championships	Nairobi, Kenya	1st	20 km walk	1:34:19 (AR, CR)
2010	Commonwealth Games	New Delhi, India	3rd	20 km walk	1:37:49
2011	World Championships	Daegu, South Korea	38th	20 km walk	1:43:59
2012	African Championships	Porto-Novo, Benin	1st	20 km walk	1:40:53
2014	African Championships	Marrakesh, Morocco	1st	20 km walk	1:37:04
2015	African Games	Brazzaville, Republic of the Congo	1st	20 km walk	1:38:28
2016	African Championships	Durban, South Africa	1st	20 km walk	1:30:43
2018	Commonwealth Games	Gold Coast, Australia	8th	20 km walk	1:42:23
2018	African Championships	Asaba, Nigeria	2nd	20 km walk	1:35:54
2019	African Games	Rabat, Morocco	2nd	20 km walk	1:34:57
