= Sun Huanhuan =

Chinese racewalker (born 1990)

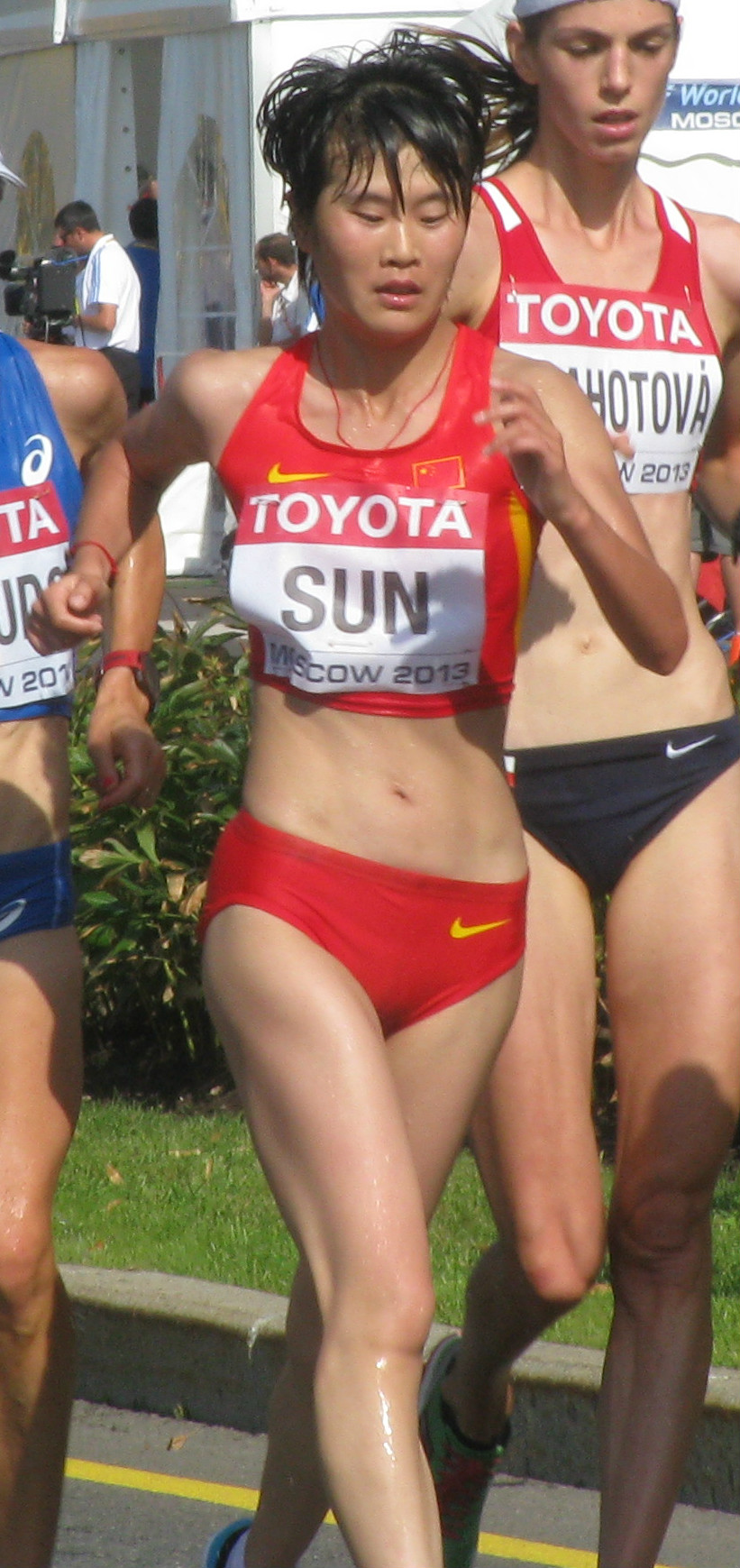
Sun at the 2013 World Championships in Athletics

Sun Huanhuan (Chinese: 孙欢欢; born 15 March 1990) is a Chinese female racewalking athlete who competes in the 20 kilometres race walk event. She received a silver medal retroactively at the World Championships in Athletics in 2013 after the original gold and silver medallists were disqualified for doping.

She first began competing in 2007 but it was not until 2013 that she received her first international call-up. A member of the People's Army, she entered her first international event at the Taicang leg of the 2013 IAAF Race Walking Challenge. She surprised by winning the competition, beating Olympic medallist Qieyang Shenjie among others. Two months later she competed at the 2013 Chinese National Games, but could only managed fifth in a quick contest (Lü Xiuzhi was the winner).

At the 2013 World Championships in Athletics she placed fourth behind compatriot Liu Hong. The runner-up, Anisya Kirdyapkina was disqualified for doping and had her silver medal stripped in 2019. The winner, Russia's Elena Lashmanova was disqualified for doping in 2014, but her medal stood until it was disqualified by the Athletics Integrity Unit in 2021 when Sun was upgraded to silver. Sun was part of China's silver medal-winning team at the 2014 IAAF World Race Walking Cup, taking 20th individually. She missed national selection in 2015 and 2016, with her most notable result in the period being third in Taicang on the 2015 IAAF Race Walking Challenge.

== International competitions ==
Year	Competition	Venue	Position	Event	Notes
2013	World Championships	Moscow, Russia	2nd	20 km walk	1:28:32
2014	World Race Walking Cup	Taicang, China	20th	20 km walk	1:29:20
2014	World Race Walking Cup	Taicang, China	2nd	Team	22 pts
