= Voronovo, Vladimir Oblast =

Voronovo Вороново
- Village
- Location within Vladimir Oblast Location within Russia
- Coordinates: 56°00′N 39°01′E
- Country: Russia
- Region: Vladimir Oblast
- District: Petushinsky District
- Time zone: UTC+3:00

Voronovo (Russian: Вороново) is a rural locality (a village) in Nagornoye Rural Settlement, Petushinsky District, Vladimir Oblast, Russia. The population was 2 as of 2010.

== Geography ==
Voronovo is located 40 km northwest of Petushki (the district's administrative centre) by road. Barskovo is the nearest rural locality.
