= Mouhcine Cheaouri =

Moroccan pole vaulter (born 1989)

Personal information
- Born: 15 January 1989 (age 37) Oujda, Morocco
Medal record
Men's athletics
Representing Morocco
African Championships
Gold medal – first place	2008 Addis Ababa	Pole vault
Gold medal – first place	2012 Porto-Novo	Pole vault
Bronze medal – third place	2014 Marrakesh	Pole vault

Mouhcine Cheaouri (born 15 January 1989) is a Moroccan track and field athlete who competes in the pole vault. He is a two-time African champion in the event and has a personal best of 5.20 metres.

== Career ==
Born in the city of Oujda, Cheaouri made his international debut at the 2007 Pan Arab Games, where he finished in sixth place. He improved his personal best to 5.20 m in 2008 and quickly ascended to the top of the regional scene by winning the gold medal at the 2008 African Championships in Athletics, beating decathletes Larbi Bouraada and Willem Coertzen.

He did not compete in 2009 and 2010, but returned to form in 2011 with a clearance of 5.20 m in Meknes. He placed ninth at the 2011 Military World Games, was runner-up at the Arab Athletics Championships, then took the gold medal at the 2011 Pan Arab Games. A vault of 5.10 m was enough to secure his second continental win at the 2012 African Championships in Athletics.

In 2016 he tested positive for stanozolol and was banned from competition for four years between 30 April 2016 and 9 June 2020.

== Achievements ==
Year	Competition	Venue	Position	Notes
Representing Morocco
2007	African Junior Championships	Ouagadougou, Burkina Faso	3rd	4.40 m
2007	Pan Arab Games	Cairo, Egypt	6th	4.60 m
2008	African Championships	Addis Ababa, Ethiopia	1st	4.80 m
2011	Arab Championships	Al Ain, United Arab Emirates	2nd	4.80 m
2011	Pan Arab Games	Doha, Qatar	1st	5.10 m
2012	African Championships	Porto-Novo, Benin	1st	5.10 m
2013	Arab Championships	Doha, Qatar	1st	5.00 m
2013	Islamic Solidarity Games	Palembang, Indonesia	1st	5.10 m
2014	African Championships	Marrakesh, Morocco	3rd	5.00 m
