= Bahia Boussad =

Algerian race walker

Medal record

Women's athletics

Representing Algeria

African Championships
Gold medal – first place	2000 Algiers	10 km walk
Silver medal – second place	2002 Radès	10 km walk
Bronze medal – third place	2004 Brazzaville	20 km walk

Bahia Boussad (born 31 January 1979) is a retired Algerian athlete who competed in racewalking events. She represented her country at the 2000 Summer Olympics, placing last out of all the finishers.

== Competition record ==
Year	Competition	Venue	Position	Event	Notes
Representing Algeria
1999	All-Africa Games	Johannesburg, South Africa	3rd	10,000 m walk	51:31
2000	African Championships	Algiers, Algeria	1st	20 km walk	49:33
2000	Olympic Games	Sydney, Australia	45th	20 km walk	1:52.50
2002	African Championships	Tunis, Tunisia	2nd	20 km walk	49:57
2003	All-Africa Games	Abuja, Nigeria	4th	20 km walk	1:51.48
2003	Afro-Asian Games	Hyderabad, India	1st	10,000 m walk	51:23.70
2004	African Championships	Brazzaville, Republic of the Congo	3rd	20 km walk	1:46.12
2004	Pan Arab Games	Algiers, Algeria	1st	10,000 m walk	53:39.9
2005	Mediterranean Games	Almería, Spain	–	20,000 m walk	DQ
2006	African Championships	Bambous, Mauritius	4th	20 km walk	1:47:34
2007	All-Africa Games	Algiers, Algeria	5th	20 km walk	1:51:56
2008	African Championships	Addis Ababa, Ethiopia	6th	20 km walk	1:41:53
