= Chaima Trabelsi =

Tunisian race walker (born 1982)

Personal information
- Nationality: Tunisia
- Born: 11 March 1982 (age 44) Tunisia

Sport
- Sport: Athletics
- Event: 20 km walk
Medal record
Women's athletics
Representing Tunisia
All-Africa Games
Gold medal – first place	2007 Algiers	20 km walk
Gold medal – first place	2011 Maputo	20 km walk
African Championships
Silver medal – second place	2010 Nairobi	20 km walk
- Updated on 27 March 2013

Chaima Trabelsi (born 11 March 1982) is a Tunisian race walker. She competes in the 20 kilometres race walk.

At both the 2007 and the 2011 All-Africa Games, Trabelsi won a gold medal in 20 km walk event.

== Competition record ==
Year	Competition	Venue	Position	Event	Notes
Representing Tunisia
1999	African Junior Championships	Tunis, Tunisia	1st	20 km walk	26:04.45
2006	African Championships	Bambous, Mauritius	5th	20 km walk	1:48:53
2007	Arab Championships	Amman, Jordan	1st	10 km walk	50:06.0
2007	All-Africa Games	Algiers, Algeria	1st	20 km walk	1:49:13
2007	Pan Arab Games	Cairo, Egypt	1st	10,000 m walk	53:52.0
2008	African Championships	Addis Ababa, Ethiopia	8th	20 km walk	1:43:54
2009	World Championships	Berlin, Germany	31st	20 km walk	1:39:50
2009	Jeux de la Francophonie	Beirut, Lebanon	1st	10,000 m walk	48:27
2009	Arab Championships	Damascus, Syria	1st	10 km walk	49:09.7
2010	World Race Walking Cup	Chihuahua, Mexico	–	20 km walk	DNF
2010	African Championships	Nairobi, Kenya	2nd	20 km walk	1:35:33
2011	World Championships	Daegu, South Korea	40th	20 km walk	1:46:29
2011	All-Africa Games	Maputo, Mozambique	1st	20 km walk	1:40:35
2011	Pan Arab Games	Doha, Qatar	1st	10,000 m walk	48:17.91
2012	World Race Walking Cup	Saransk, Russia	77th	20 km walk	1:47:40
2012	African Championships	Porto-Novo, Benin	–	20 km walk	DNF
