= Chahinez Nasri =

Tunisian race walker

Personal information
- Born: 3 June 1996 (age 30)

Sport
- Sport: Track and field
- Event: 20 kilometres race walk
Medal record
Women's athletics
Representing Tunisia
African Championships
| Bronze medal – third place | 2016 Durban | 20 km walk |
| Bronze medal – third place | 2018 Asaba | 20 km walk |

Chahinez Nasri (born 3 June 1996) is a Tunisian race walker. She competed in the women's 20 kilometres walk event at the 2016 Summer Olympics. In 2019, she competed in the women's 20 kilometres walk event at the 2019 World Athletics Championships held in Doha, Qatar. She did not finish her race.
