= Askale Tiksa =

Ethiopian athlete

Personal information
- Born: 24 April 1994 (age 32)

Sport
- Sport: Track and field
- Event: 20 kilometres race walk
Medal record
Women's athletics
Representing Ethiopia
African Games
Bronze medal – third place	2015 Brazzaville	20 km walk
African Championships
Bronze medal – third place	2014 Marrakesh	20 km walk

Askale Tiksa Benti (born 24 April 1994) is an Ethiopian race walker. She competed in the women's 20 kilometres walk event at the 2016 Summer Olympics.
