= Nicolene Cronje =

South African racewalker (born 1983)

Personal information
- Full name: Nicolene Cronje
- Nationality: South Africa
- Born: 16 June 1983 (age 43) Bellville, Western Cape, South Africa
- Height: 1.68 m (5 ft 6 in)
- Weight: 53 kg (117 lb)

Sport
- Sport: Athletics
- Event: Race walking
- Club: Central Gauteng Athletics

Achievements and titles
- Personal best: 20 km walk: 1:36:19
Medal record
Women's athletics
Representing South Africa
African Championships
Silver medal – second place	2004 Brazzaville	20 km walk

Nicolene Cronje (born 16 June 1983 in Bellville, Western Cape) is a South African race walker. She has been selected to compete for South Africa at the 2004 Summer Olympics, and holds numerous African championship titles and continental records in race walking (a distance of both 10 and 20 km). Cronje also trains at Central Gauteng Athletics in Johannesburg.

Cronje established South African track and field history, when she became the first ever female race walker to be sent to the 2004 Summer Olympics in Athens, competing in the 20 km walk. She achieved the IAAF B-standard and a personal best of 1:36:19, following her victory at the South African championships in Durban. Cronje successfully finished the race with a forty-seventh place time in 1:42:37, just nearly thirteen seconds after the Greeks cheered on Athanasia Tsoumeleka's surprising triumph inside the Olympic stadium.
