= Emily Wamusyi Ngii =

Kenyan race walker (born 1986)

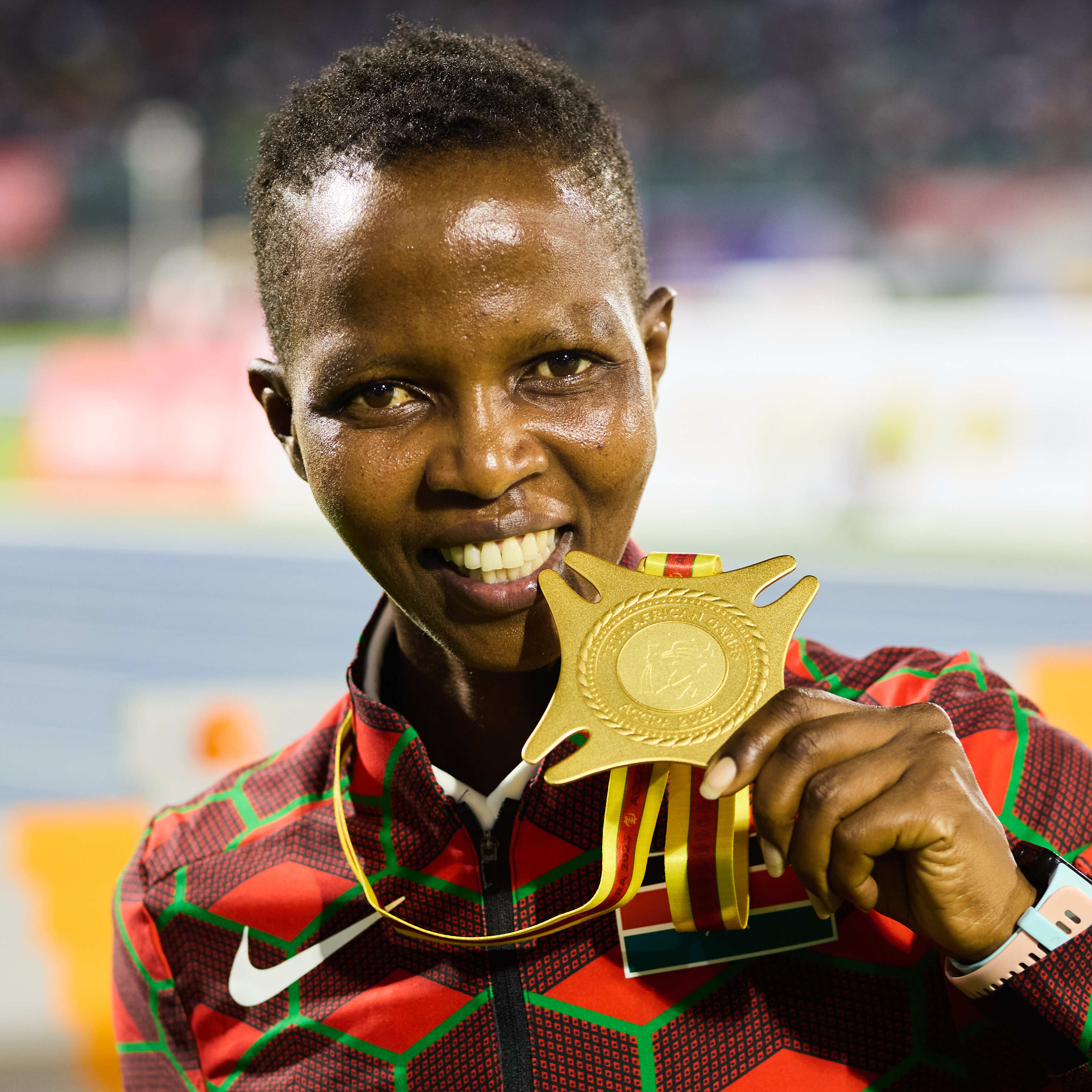
- Ngii at the 2023 African Games

Personal information
- Born: 13 August 1986 (age 39)

Sport
- Country: Kenya
- Sport: Athletics
- Event: Race walking
Medal record
Women's athletics
Representing Kenya
Commonwealth Games
Bronze medal – third place	2022 Birmingham	10,000 m walk
African Games
Gold medal – first place	2019 Rabat	20 km walk
Gold medal – first place	2023 Accra	20 km walk
African Championships
Gold medal – first place	2022 Saint Pierre	20 km walk
Silver medal – second place	2014 Marrakesh	20 km walk

Emily Wamusyi Ngii (born 13 August 1986) is a Kenyan race walker. At the 2019 African Games held in Rabat, Morocco, she won the gold medal in the women's 20 kilometres walk event.

At the 2014 African Championships in Athletics held in Marrakesh, Morocco, she won the silver medal in the women's 20 kilometres walk event.

She competed in the women's 20 kilometres walk at the 2022 World Athletics Championships held in Eugene, Oregon, United States.
