= Yehualeye Beletew =

Ethiopian race walker

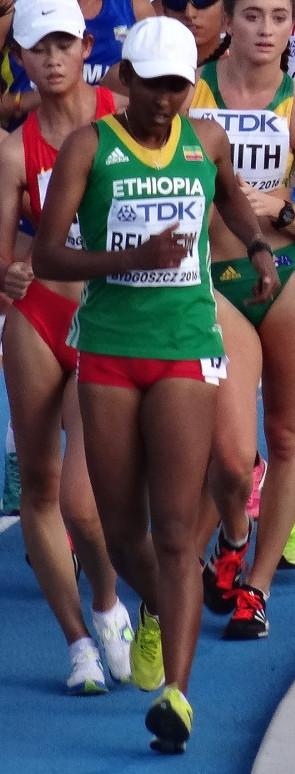
- Yehualeye Beletew in 2016

Personal information
- Full name: Yehualeye Beletew Mitiku
- Nationality: Ethiopian
- Born: 31 July 1998 (age 27)

Sport
- Sport: Track and field
- Event: 20 kilometres race walk
Medal record
Women's athletics
Representing Ethiopia
African Championships
Gold medal – first place	2018 Asaba	20 km walk

Yehualeye Beletew Mitiku (born 31 July 1998) is an Ethiopian race walker. She competed in the women's 20 kilometres walk event at the 2016 Summer Olympics. In 2019, she competed in the women's 20 kilometres walk event at the 2019 World Athletics Championships held in Doha, Qatar. She finished in 16th place. She competed in the women's 20 kilometres walk event at the 2020 Summer Olympics.
