= List of South African records in athletics =

The following are the national records in athletics in South Africa maintained by Athletics South Africa (ASA).

== Outdoor ==
Key to tables: Awaiting ratification Record not kept by ASA Not ratified or later rescinded by ASA

=== Men ===
Event	Record	Athlete	Date	Meet	Place	Ref.
60 m	6.58 A (−1.8 m/s)	Bayanda Walaza	8 February 2025	Curro Podium Grand Finale & Simbine Classic Shootout	Pretoria, South Africa	
100 y	9.41+ (−0.4 m/s)	Simon Magakwe	17 June 2014	Golden Spike Ostrava	Ostrava, Czech Republic	
100 m	9.82 (+1.0 m/s)	Akani Simbine	4 August 2024	Olympic Games	Paris, France	
150 m	14.78 (+0.0 m/s m/s)	Sinesipho Dambile	16 June 2026	Golden Spike Ostrava	Ostrava, Czech Republic	
200 m	19.69 A (−0.5 m/s)	Clarence Munyai	16 March 2018	National Championships	Pretoria, South Africa	
200 m straight	19.84 (+0.6 m/s)	Wayde van Niekerk	4 June 2017	Boost Boston Games	Boston, United States	
300 m	30.81 ^{[WB]}	Wayde Van Niekerk	28 June 2017	Golden Spike Ostrava	Ostrava, Czech Republic	
400 m	43.03	Wayde van Niekerk	14 August 2016	Olympic Games	Rio de Janeiro, Brazil	
600 m	1:15.58 A	Reinhardt van Rensburg	30 January 2015	Eaglesclub Classic Shootout	Pretoria, South Africa	
600 m	1:15.03	André Olivier	24 August 2014	Diamond League	Birmingham, United Kingdom	
600 m	1:15.13	Hezekiél Sepeng	September 2000		Gold Coast, Australia	
600 m	1:15.57	Hendrick Mokganyetsi	15 June 1997		Leeds, United Kingdom	
800 m	1:42.69	Hezekiél Sepeng	3 September 1999	Memorial Van Damme	Brussels, Belgium	
1000 m	2:15.86	Mbulaeni Mulaudzi	7 August 2007	DN Galan	Stockholm, Sweden	
1500 m	3:31.35	Tshepo Tshite	20 June 2025	Meeting de Paris	Paris, France	
Mile	3:50.70	Johan Cronje	31 May 2014	Prefontaine Classic	Eugene, United States	
Mile (road)	3:55.66	Tshepo Tshite	19 September 2026	World Road Running Championships	Copenhagen, Denmark	
2000 m	4:56.41	Johan Fourie	22 April 1985		Stellenbosch, South Africa	
3000 m	7:32.99	Adriaan Wildschutt	25 August 2024	Kamila Skolimoswka Memorial	Chorzów, Poland	
5000 m	12:56.67 (Note: Outdoor best; indoor mark ratified as absolute record.)	Adriaan Wildschutt	30 May 2024	Bislett Games	Oslo, Norway	
5 km (road)	13:06	Maxime Chaumeton	4 April 2026	Urban Trail de Lille	Lille, France	
10,000 m	26:50.64	Adriaan Wildschutt	2 August 2024	Olympic Games	Paris, France	
10 km (road)	26:55	Maxime Chaumeton	5 October 2025	Brașov Running Festival	Brașov, Romania	
15 km (road)	41:40+	Adriaan Wildschutt	26 October 2025	Valencia Half Marathon	Valencia, Spain	
10 miles (road)	46:11	Hendrick Ramaala	20 September 1998	Glen Dimplex Cross Border Challenge	Newry, United Kingdom	
20 km (road)	56:07+	Adriaan Wildschutt	26 October 2025	Valencia Half Marathon	Valencia, Spain	
One hour	20386 m	Kevin Shaw	2 October 1978		Bellville, South Africa	
Half marathon	59:13	Adriaan Wildschutt	26 October 2025	Valencia Half Marathon	Valencia, Spain	
25 km (road)	1:13:24+	Elroy Gelant	27 April 2025	Hamburg Marathon	Hamburg, Germany	
30 km (road)	1:28:10+	Elroy Gelant	27 April 2025	Hamburg Marathon	Hamburg, Germany	
Marathon	2:05:36	Elroy Gelant	27 April 2025	Hamburg Marathon	Hamburg, Germany	
50 km (road)	2:39:04	Tete Dijana	26 February 2023	Nedbank Runified Breaking Barriers 50km	Gqeberha, South Africa	
100 km (road)	6:24:06	Bongmusa Mthembu	27 November 2016		Los Alcázares, Spain	
100 km (road)	5:59:20# (Note: Non-ratifiable as the athlete ran behind a car, wore unratified prototype shoes, and was paced by rotating pacemakers)	Sibusiso Kubheka	26 August 2025	Chasing 100	Nardò Ring, Italy	
110 m hurdles	13.11 (+1.8 m/s)	Antonio Alkana	5 June 2017	Josef Odložil Memorial	Prague, Czech Republic	
200 m hurdles (straight)	22.10 (+1.8 m/s)	L. J. van Zyl	9 May 2015	Manchester City Games	Manchester, United Kingdom	
200 m hurdles (bend)	22.6 h A OT	Hendrik Serfontein	23 March 1967		Bloemfontein, South Africa	
300 m hurdles	34.34	Sabelo Dhlamini	26 August 2025	International Meeting	Maribor, Slovenia	
400 m hurdles	47.66 A	L. J. van Zyl	25 February 2011	Yellow Pages Invitation Series II	Pretoria, South Africa	
400 m hurdles	47.66	L. J. van Zyl	31 May 2011	Golden Spike Ostrava	Ostrava, Czech Republic	
2000 m steeplechase	5:26.46	Ruben Ramolefi	30 June 2010	Meeting de la ville de Reims	Reims, France	
3000 m steeplechase	8:11.50	Ruben Ramolefi	29 August 2011	World Championships	Daegu, South Korea	
High jump	2.38 m	Jacques Freitag	5 March 2005		Oudtshoorn, South Africa	
Pole vault	6.03 m	Okkert Brits	18 August 1995		Cologne, Germany	
Long jump	8.65 m A (+1.3 m/s)	Luvo Manyonga	22 April 2017	South African Championships	Potchefstroom, South Africa	
Triple jump	17.35 m (+0.2 m/s)	Godfrey Mokoena	14 September 2014	IAAF Continental Cup	Marrakech, Morocco	
Shot put	21.97 m	Janus Robberts	2 June 2001		Eugene, United States	
Discus throw	70.32 m	Frantz Kruger	26 May 2002		Salon-de-Provence, France	
Hammer throw	80.63 m	Chris Harmse	15 April 2005		Durban, South Africa	
Javelin throw	88.75 m	Marius Corbett	21 September 1998	Commonwealth Games	Kuala Lumpur, Malaysia	
Decathlon	8398 pts	Willem Coertzen	30–31 May 2015	Hypo-Meeting	Götzis, Austria	
Decathlon	100m (wind) / Long jump (wind) / Shot put / High jump / 400m / 110m H (wind) / Discus / Pole vault / Javelin / 1500m; 10.99 (+0.3 m/s) / 7.46 m (−1.0 m/s) / 14.14 m / 2.03 m / 48.73 / 14.17 (+1.5 m/s) / 44.84 m / 4.60 m / 68.43 m / 4:22.22					
3000 m walk (track)	10:47.08	Lebogang Shange	21 July 2018	Diamond League	London, United Kingdom	
5000 m walk (track)	18:55.60	Lebogang Shange	30 June 2017	Honvéd Kupa	Budapest, Hungary	
10,000 m walk (track)	40:32.78	Chris Britz	10 April 1995		Krugersdorp, South Africa	
10 km walk (road)	43:09	Tebatso Mashimbyi	24 February 2018	Central Gauteng Championships	Germiston, South Africa	
20,000 m walk (track)	1:23:20.86	Lebogang Shange	21 June 2015	British Championships	Bedford, United Kingdom	
20 km walk (road)	1:19:18	Lebogang Shange	13 August 2017	World Championships	London, United Kingdom	
30 km walk (road)	2:14:28	Chris Britz	25 August 1994		Victoria, Australia	
35 km walk (road)	2:31:15	Wayne Snyman	24 July 2022	World Championships	Eugene, United States	
50 km walk (road)	3:53:09	Marc Mundell	20 March 2021	Dudinská Päťdesiatka	Dudince, Slovakia	
4 × 100 m relay	37.49	South Africa; Mvuyo Moss; Cheswill Johnson; Bradley Nkoana; Akani Simbine	3 May 2026	World Relays	Gaborene, Botswana	
4 × 200 m relay	1:20.42	South Africa; Simon Magakwe; Chederick van Wyk; Sinesipho Dambile; Akani Simbine	12 May 2019	IAAF World Relays	Yokohama, Japan	
4 × 400 m relay	2:55.07	South Africa; Mthi Mthimkulu; Lythe Pillay; Leendert Koekemoer; Zakithi Nene	3 May 2026	World Relays	Gaborene, Botswana	
4 × 800 m relay	7:04.70	South Africa; Gideon van Oudtshoorn; Hezekiel Sepeng; Jurgens Kotze; Johan Botha	6 June 1999		Stuttgart, Germany	
4 × 1500 m relay	14:50.82	South Africa; Matthews Temane; Deon Brummer; Henning Gericke; Johan Fourie	15 October 1984		Port Elizabeth, South Africa	

=== Women ===
Event	Record	Athlete	Date	Meet	Place	Ref.
100 m	10.98 (+1.5 m/s)	Carina Horn	4 May 2018	Diamond League	Doha, Qatar	
150 m	17.67 A (−0.5 m/s)	Kayla la Grange	8 February 2025	Curro Podium Grand Finale & Simbine Classic Shootout	Pretoria, South Africa	
200 m	22.06 A (+0.7 m/s)	Evette de Klerk	8 April 1989		Pietersburg, South Africa	
300 m	36.30 A	Marlie Viljoen	28 April 2026	Simbine Classic	Pretoria, South Africa	
400 m	49.62	Caster Semenya	8 September 2018	Continental Cup	Ostrava, Czech Republic	
600 m	1:21.77	Caster Semenya	27 August 2017	ISTAF Berlin	Berlin, Germany	
800 m	1:54.25	Caster Semenya	30 June 2018	Meeting de Paris	Paris, France	
1000 m	2:30.70	Caster Semenya	2 September 2018	ISTAF Berlin	Berlin, Germany	
1500 m	3:59.92	Caster Semenya	4 May 2018	Diamond League	Doha, Qatar	
Mile	4:23.38	Zola Budd	4 March 1991		Port Elizabeth, South Africa	
Mile (road)	4:19.6 h	Dominique Scott	10 September 2017		New York City, United States	
2000 m	5:38.07	Zola Budd	8 April 1991		Cape Town, South Africa	
3000 m	8:32.00	Elana Meyer	29 April 1991		Durban, South Africa	
5000 m	14:44.05	Elana Meyer	22 July 1995		Hechtel-Eksel, Belgium	
5 km (road)	14:51 Wo	Tayla Kavanagh	19 September 2026	World Road Running Championships	Copenhagen, Denmark	
10,000 m	30:52.51	Elana Meyer	10 September 1994		London, United Kingdom	
10 km (road)	30:50 Wo	Tayla Kavanagh	4 October 2026	tRUNsylvania International 10K Brasov	Brașov, Romania	
15 km (road)	46:57	Elana Meyer	2 November 1991		Cape Town, South Africa	
15 km (road)	48:12+ Wo	Glenrose Xaba	20 September 2026	World Road Running Championships	Copenhagen, Denmark	
10 miles (road)	51:16	Colleen De Reuck	5 April 1998	Cherry Blossom Ten Mile Run	Washington, D.C., United States	
20 km (road)	1:04:04+	Dominique Scott-Efurd	15 January 2022	Houston Half Marathon	Houston, United States	
20 km (road)	1:04:17+ Wo	Glenrose Xaba	20 September 2026	World Road Running Championships	Copenhagen, Denmark	
Half marathon	1:06:44	Elana Meyer	15 January 1999		Tokyo, Japan	
Half marathon	1:07:49 Wo	Glenrose Xaba	20 September 2026	World Road Running Championships	Copenhagen, Denmark	
25 km (road)	1:27:26	Colleen De Reuck	30 Jan 1994		Pinetown, South Africa	
30 km (road)	1:43:46+	Gerda Steyn	11 April 2021	Xiamen Marathon & Tuscany Camp Global Elite Race	Siena, Italy	
Marathon	2:22:22	Glenrose Xaba	20 October 2024	Sanlam Cape Town Marathon	Cape Town, South Africa	
50 km (road)	3:04:24 Wo (Note: by IAU source; 3:04:23 by other sources)	Irvette Van Zyl	23 May 2021	Nedbank Runified Race	Port Elizabeth, South Africa	
100 km (road)	7:42:05	Lindsay van Aswegen	10 September 2011	25th IAU World Championships	Winschoten, Netherlands	
100 km (road)	7:31:47	Helene Joubert	16 September 1995		Winschoten, Netherlands	
100 m hurdles	12.49 (+1.6 m/s)	Marione Fourie	7 July 2024	FBK Games	Hengelo, Netherlands	
200 m hurdles (straight)	26.16 (+0.3 m/s)	Zeney van der Walt	16 June 2019	Adidas Boost Boston Games	Boston, United States	
300 m hurldes	43.18 A	Lenka du Toit	8 February 2025	Curro Podium Grand Finale & Simbine Classic Shootout	Pretoria, South Africa	
400 m hurdles	53.74	Myrtle Bothma	18 April 1986		Johannesburg, South Africa	
2000 m steeplechase	6:34.72	Nolene Conrad	16 May 2016	52nd Internationales Pfingstsportfest	Rehlingen, Germany	
3000 m steeplechase	9:54.19	Tebogo Masehla	4 June 2011	Memorial Léon Buyle	Oordegem, Belgium	
High jump	2.06 m	Hestrie Cloete	31 August 2003	World Championships	Saint-Denis, France	
Pole vault	4.50 m	Ansume de Beer	30 June 2026	Fribourg International Meeting	Fribourg, Switzerland	
Long jump	6.93 m (+1.6 m/s)	Karin Melis Mey	7 July 2007	14th Weitsprung-Meeting der Weltklasse	Bad Langensalza, Germany	
Long jump	6.93 m (+0.6 m/s)	Karin Melis Mey	7 June 2008	15th Weitsprung-Meeting der Weltklasse	Bad Langensalza, Germany	
Triple jump	14.03 m A (−1.3 m/s)	Zinzi Chabangu	7 March 2020		Pretoria, South Africa	
Shot put	17.88 m	Drienkie van Wyk	25 January 2002		Germiston, South Africa	
Discus throw	64.87 m	Elizna Naude	2 March 2007		Stellenbosch, South Africa	
Hammer throw	68.66 m	Phethisang Makhete	16 May 2025	Big Ten Championships	Eugene, United States	
Javelin throw	69.35 m	Sunette Viljoen	9 June 2012	Adidas Grand Prix	New York City, United States	
Heptathlon	6181 pts	Janice Josephs	22–23 March 2006	Commonwealth Games	Melbourne, Australia	
Heptathlon	100m H (wind) / High jump / Shot put / 200m (wind) / Long jump (wind) / Javelin / 800m; 13.65 (+2.0 m/s) / 1.70 m / 11.79 m / 23.42 (+0.9 m/s) / 6.22 m (−1.4 m/s) / 43.77 m / 2:10.61					
3000 m walk (track)	12:53.19	Nicolene Cronje	20 February 2004		Pretoria, South Africa	
5000 m walk (track)	22:19.64	Nicolene Cronje	5 March 2004		Durban, South Africa	
5 km walk (road)	22:20	Nicolene Cronje	5 March 2004	ABSA Series	Durban, South Africa	
10,000 m walk (track)	47:32.54 A	Nicolene Cronje	19 March 2005		Pretoria, South Africa	
10 km walk (road)	45:05	Susan Vermeulen	17 April 1999		Bloemfontein, South Africa	
15 km walk (road)	1:10:31+	Anél Oosthuizen	9 April 2016	Poděbrady Walking Race	Poděbrady, Czech Republic	
20,000 m walk (track)	1:36:18.3 h	Nicolene Cronje	16 April 2004		Durban, South Africa	
20 km walk (road)	1:34:49	Anél Oosthuizen	8 April 2017	Poděbrady Walking Race	Poděbrady, Czech Republic	
20 km walk (road)	1:34:49	Anél Oosthuizen	9 April 2016	Poděbrady Walking Race	Poděbrady, Czech Republic	
35 km walk (road)	3:20:25+	Natalie le Roux	5 May 2018	IAAF World Race Walking Team Championships	Taicang, China	
50 km walk (road)	4:48:00	Natalie le Roux	5 May 2018	IAAF World Race Walking Team Championships	Taicang, China	
4 × 100 m relay	43.25	South Africa; Wendy Hartman; Dikeledi Moropane; Susanna Holtshausen; Heide Seyerling	18 March 2000		Pietersburg, South Africa	
4 × 200 m relay	1:32.72	South Africa; Ina van Rensburg; Mari-Lise Furstenberg; Evette de Klerk; Maryke Doubell	9 March 1987		Bloemfontein, South Africa	
4 × 400 m relay	3:24.84	South Africa; Shirley Nekhubui; Miranda Coetzee; Precious Molepo; Zenéy Geldenhuys	11 May 2025	World Relays	Guangzhou, China	
4 × 800 m relay	8:19.47	South Africa; Helga van Wermeskerken; Ermyntrude Vermeulen; Yvonne Goosen; Elize Fouche	13 February 1985		Johannesburg, South Africa	

=== Mixed ===
Event	Record	Athlete	Date	Meet	Place	Ref.
4 × 400 m relay	3:11.16	South Africa; Gardeo Isaacs; Miranda Coetzee; Leendert Koekemoer; Zenéy van der Walt	13 September 2025	World Championships	Tokyo, Japan	

== Indoor ==
=== Men ===
Event	Record	Athlete	Date	Meet	Place	Ref.
50 m	5.62+	Morné Nagel	24 February 2002	Meeting Pas de Calais	Liévin, France	
60 m	6.48	Morné Nagel	27 January 2002		Dortmund, Germany	
100 m	10.42	Morné Nagel	12 February 2005		Tampere, Finland	
200 m	20.45	Ncincilili Titi	20 January 2018	Clemson Invitational	Clemson, United States	
400 m	45.67	Derrick Mokaleng	9 February 2019	Texas Tech Shootout	Lubbock, United States	
600 m	1:17.25 OT	Mbulaeni Mulaudzi	12 February 2005		Tampere, Finland	
800 m	1:44.91	Mbulaeni Mulaudzi	9 March 2008	World Championships	Valencia, Spain	
1000 m	2:16.71	Johan Botha	3 February 1999		Erfurt, Germany	
1500 m	3:35.06	Tshepo Tshite	6 February 2024	Copernicus Cup	Toruń, Poland	
Mile	3:54.10	Tshepo Tshite	13 February 2025	Meeting Hauts-de-France Pas-de-Calais	Liévin, France	
3000 m	7:36.90	Tshepo Tshite	19 February 2026	Meeting Hauts-de-France Pas-de-Calais	Liévin, France	
5000 m	12:55.02	Adriaan Wildschutt	2 March 2025	BU Last Chance	Boston, United States	
50 m hurdles	6.48+	Shaun Bownes	25 February 2001	Meeting Pas de Calais	Liévin, France	
55 m hurdles	7.13	Lehann Fourie	11 February 2012	Millrose Games	New York City, United States	
60 m hurdles	7.50	Franco Le Roux	21 March 2026	World Championships	Toruń, Poland	
300 m hurdles	34.92 OT	Llewellyn Herbert	9 February 1999	Pirkkahalli	Tampere, Finland	
400 m hurdles	49.90 OT	Llewellyn Herbert	9 February 2005	Botnia Games	Korsholm, Finland	
High jump	2.28 m	Jacques Freitag	26 January 2005	Pedro's Cup	Bydgoszcz, Poland	
High jump	2.28 m	Jacques Freitag	20 February 2005		Tallinn, Estonia	
High jump	2.28 m	Ramsay Carelse	28 February 2006		Tallinn, Estonia	
Pole vault	5.90 m	Okkert Brits	16 February 1997	Meeting Pas de Calais	Liévin, France	
Pole vault	5.90 (Note: exhibition)	Okkert Brits	1 June 1997		Toronto, Canada	
Long jump	8.44 m	Luvo Manyonga	2 March 2018	World Championships	Birmingham, United Kingdom	
Triple jump	16.22 m	Godfrey Khotso Mokoena	20 February 2007	GE Galan	Stockholm, Sweden	
Shot put	21.47 m	Janus Robberts	1 December 2001		Norman, United States	
Weight throw	19.21 m	Justin Donkin	15 February 2020	Midwest Elite Invitational	Whitewater, United States	
Heptathlon	4920 pts	Niel Giliomee	22–23 February 2016	Sun Belt Championships	Birmingham, United States	
Heptathlon	60m / Long jump / Shot put / High jump / 60m H / Pole vault / 1000m; 7.25 / 6.61 m / 10.74 m / 1.70 m / 8.89 / 4.95 m / 3:00.19					
5000 m walk						
4 × 400 m relay	3:08.45	South Africa; Thapelo Phora; Ofentse Mogawane; Jon Seeliger; Shaun de Jager	19 March 2016	World Championships	Portland, United States	

=== Women ===
Event	Record	Athlete	Date	Meet	Place	Ref.
60 m	7.09	Carina Horn	11 February 2018	Meeting Elite	Metz, France	
200 m	23.16	Wendy Hartman	5 March 1999	World Championships	Maebashi, Japan	
400 m	54.86	Gontse Morake	28 January 2023	Razorback Invitational	Fayetteville, United States	
800 m	1:58.40	Prudence Sekgodiso	23 March 2025	World Championships	Nanjing, China	
1000 m	2:42.60	Dominique Scott	19 January 2015	Arkansas Invitational	Fayetteville, United States	
1500 m	4:07.25	Dominique Scott-Efurd	10 February 2018	New Balance Indoor Grand Prix	Roxbury, United States	
Mile	4:28.47	Dominique Scott	11 February 2017		New York City, United States	
3000 m	8:41.18	Dominique Scott-Efurd	3 February 2018	Millrose Games	New York City, United States	
Two miles	9:31.98	Dominique Scott	25 January 2020	New Balance Grand Prix	Boston, United States	
5000 m	15:45.40	René Kalmer	10 February 2010	GE Galan	Stockholm, Sweden	
60 m hurdles	7.91	Marione Fourie	19 January 2025	CMCM Luxembourg Meeting	Kirchberg, Luxembourg	
High jump	1.97 m	Hestrie Cloete	18 February 2001	Aviva Indoor Grand Prix	Birmingham, United Kingdom	
Pole vault	4.41 m	Elmarie Gerryts	20 February 2000	Aviva Indoor Grand Prix	Birmingham, United Kingdom	
Long jump	6.85 m	Karin Melis Mey	21 February 2008	GE Galan	Stockholm, Sweden	
Triple jump	11.50 m	Cindy Peters	1 February 2015	Championats Regionaux	Nantes, France	
Shot put	17.49 m	Simoné du Toit	29 January 2011		Houston, United States	
Weight throw	24.40 m	Phethisang Makhethe	13 March 2026	NCAA Division I Championships	Fayetteville, United States	
Pentathlon	3417 pts OT	Liezel Theron	21 January 2022		Nashville, United States	
Pentathlon	60m H / High jump / Shot put / Long jump / 800m; 9.41 / 1.60 m / 9.32 m / 5.19 m / 2:24.93					
Pentathlon	3217 pts	Nienka Du Toit	21 February 2019	Mountain West Championships	Albuquerque, United States	
Pentathlon	60m H / High jump / Shot put / Long jump / 800m; 9.56 / 1.58 m / 12.43 m / 5.08 m / 2:52.50					
3000 m walk	15:57.06	Ada Booyens	6 March 2010	World Masters Championships	Kamloops, Canada	
4 × 400 m relay						
