= Allan Cumming =

South African hammer thrower (born 1996)

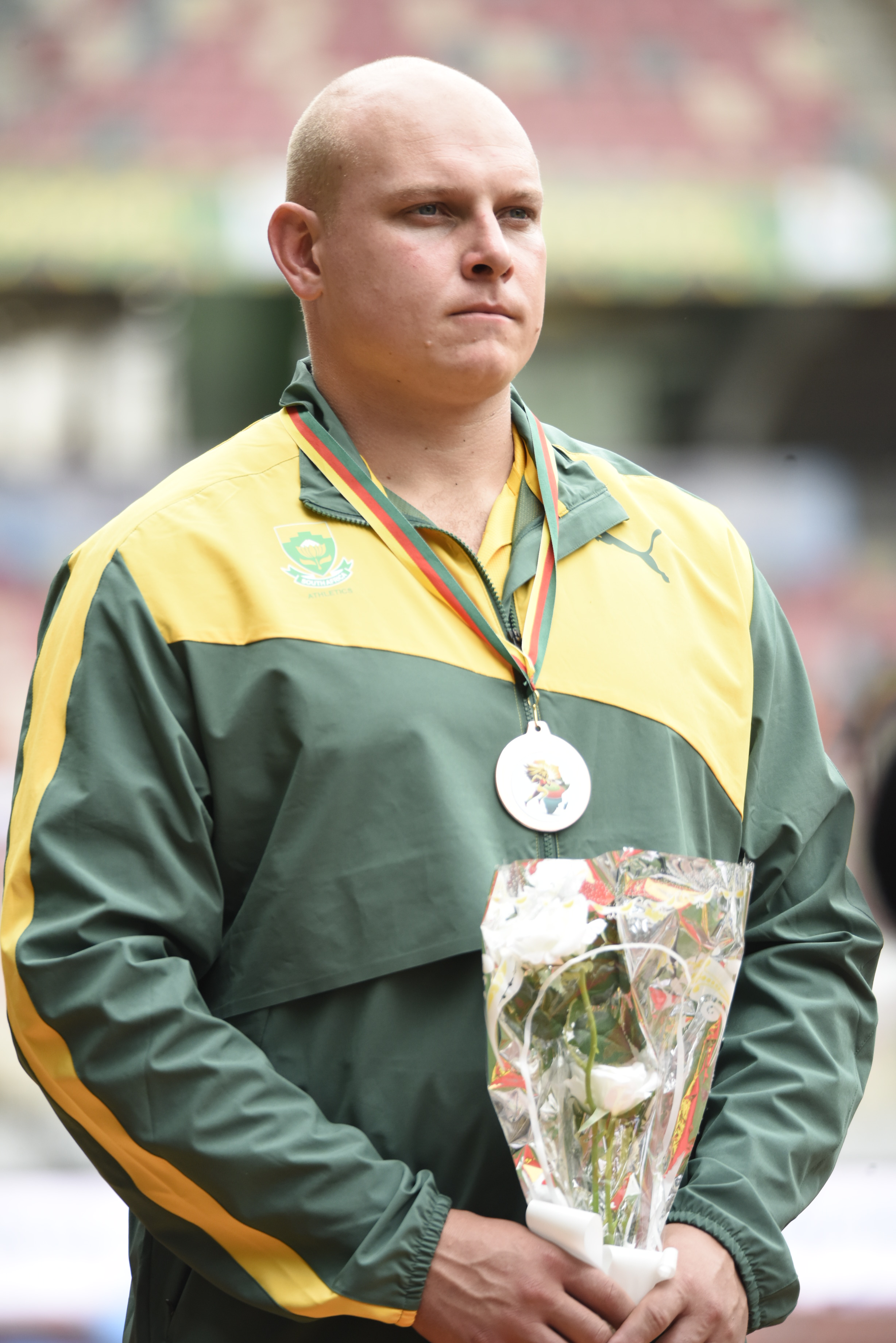

Personal information
- Nationality: South African
- Born: 21 March 1996 (age 30)

Sport
- Sport: Track and field
- Event: Hammer throw
- College team: North-West University
- Coached by: Chris Harmse

Achievements and titles
- Personal best: 73.00 m (2021)
Medal record
Men's athletics
Representing South Africa
African Games
Bronze medal – third place	2023 Accra	Hammer throw
African Championships
Gold medal – first place	2022 Mauritius	Hammer throw
Bronze medal – third place	2024 Douala	Hammer throw

Allan Cumming (born 21 March 1996) is a South African hammer thrower. He won the gold medal at the 2022 African Championships.

His personal best is 73.00 metres, set in 2021 in Potchefstroom, South Africa.

== Career ==
Cumming finished fourth at the 2015 African Junior Championships in Ethiopia, narrowly missing out on the podium. That same year he began competing at the collegiate level for North-West University, breaking the Varsity Sports record with a personal best throw of 58.13 m at his maiden meet in Stellenbosch. He was selected for his first senior international competition, the 2018 African Championships held in Nigeria, though he finished in sixth place after throwing for 67.37 m.

In 2019, Cumming won a bronze medal at the South African Championships before placing eighth at the Summer Universiade in Italy. Cumming won his first senior national title at the 2021 South African Championships, recording a throw of 72.78 m to defeat incumbent champion Tshepang Makhethe. He also won the national university title with a throw of 70.89 m, contributing to North-West University's fifth consecutive USSA team title.

Cumming achieved the double again in 2022, capturing the national title in April and the national university title in May. Then, in June, he captured the continental title at the African Championships in Mauritius with a throw of 69.13 m in the final round, finishing just ahead of Tshepang Makhethe for the gold medal.

== Personal life ==
Cumming's sister, Margo, is the national record holder in the women's hammer throw. The duo both won national championships in 2021.

Cumming earned his Bachelor of Education (BEd) from North-West University.

== Achievements ==
All information taken from World Athletics profile.

=== Personal bests ===
Type	Event	Time	Date	Place	Notes
Outdoor	Hammer throw	73.00 m	6 May 2021	Potchefstroom, South Africa	
Outdoor	Hammer throw (6 kg)	66.68 m	6 March 2015	Addis Abeba, Ethiopia	
Outdoor	Hammer throw (5 kg)	61.87 m	6 April 2013	Pretoria, South Africa	

=== International competitions ===
Year	Competition	Venue	Position	Event	Notes
Representing South Africa
2015	African Junior Championships	Addis Ababa, Ethiopia	4th	Hammer throw (6 kg)	66.68 m
2018	African Championships	Asaba, Nigeria	6th	Hammer throw	67.37 m
2019	Universiade	Naples, Italy	8th	Hammer throw	66.49 m
2022	African Championships	Saint Pierre, Mauritius	1st	Hammer throw	69.13 m
2024	African Games	Accra, Ghana	3rd	Hammer throw	67.57 m
2024	African Championships	Douala, Cameroon	3rd	Hammer throw	69.43 m

=== National championships ===
Year	Competition	Venue	Position	Event	Notes
2013	South African U18 Championships	Pretoria	2nd	Hammer throw (5 kg)	61.87 m
2015	South African Junior Championships	Bloemfontein	2nd	Hammer throw (6 kg)	64.62 m
2015	South African Championships	Stellenbosch	6th	Hammer throw	56.55 m
2016	South African U23 Championships	Germiston	2nd	Hammer throw	61.92 m
2016	South African Championships	Stellenbosch	4th	Hammer throw	62.00 m
2016	USSA Championships	Polokwane	2nd	Hammer throw	61.16 m
2017	South African Championships	Potchefstroom	4th	Hammer throw	64.94 m
2017	USSA Championships	Cape Town	2nd	Hammer throw	64.44 m
2018	South African Championships	Pretoria	5th	Hammer throw	66.06 m
2018	USSA Championships	Sasolburg	2nd	Hammer throw	65.46 m
2019	USSA Championships	Stellenbosch	2nd	Hammer throw	66.46 m
2019	South African Championships	Germiston	3rd	Hammer throw	68.79 m
2021	South African Championships	Pretoria	1st	Hammer throw	72.78 m
2021	USSA Championships	Johannesburg	1st	Hammer throw	70.89 m
2022	South African Championships	Cape Town	1st	Hammer throw	70.74 m
2022	USSA Championships	Cape Town	1st	Hammer throw	68.39 m

=== National titles ===
- South African Championships
  - Hammer throw: 2021, 2022
- USSA Championships
  - Hammer throw: 2021, 2022
