= 2015 South African Athletics Championships =

- Dates: 17–18 April 2015
- Host city: Stellenbosch
- Venue: Coetzenburg Stadium

The 2015 South African Athletics Championships was the year's edition of the national championship in outdoor track and field for South Africa. It was held on 17–18 April at the Coetzenburg Stadium in Stellenbosch. It served as the selection meeting for South Africa at the 2015 World Championships in Athletics.

== Results ==
=== Men ===
Event	Gold		Silver		Bronze	
100 metres (wind: -2.1 m/s)	Akani Simbine	10.25	Roscoe Engel	10.43	Emile Erasmus	10.66
200 metres (wind: -0.1 m/s)	Anaso Jobodwana	20.35	Roscoe Engel	20.70	Lebogang Moeng	20.72
400 metres	Wayde van Niekerk	44.91	Jon Seeliger	45.85	Berend Koekemoer	46.01
800 metres	André Olivier	1:46.02	Rynardt van Rensburg	1:46.97	Jacob Rozani	1:47.37
1500 metres	Johan Cronje	3:37.93	Dumisane Hlaselo	3:38.38	Jerry Motsau	3:39.26
5000 metres	Stephen Mokoka	13:11.44	Gladwin Mzazi	13:40.97	Sibusiso Nzima	13:41.91
10,000 metres	Stephen Mokoka	28:15.56	Sibusiso Nzima	28:49.99	Precious Mashele	29:06.38
20 km race walk	Lebogang Shange	1:23:00	Wayne Snyman	1:23:42	Mthembi Chauque	1:31:31
110 m hurdles (wind: +0.4 m/s)	Antonio Alkana	13.54	Ruan de Vries	13.83	Tshepo Lefete	13.93
400 m hurdles	L. J. van Zyl	49.29	Le Roux Hamman	50.16	PC Beneke	50.17
3000 m steeplechase	Dikotsi Lekopa	8:32.17	Tumisang Monnatlala	8:33.02	Tumelo Motlagale	8:37.33
4 × 100 m relay	Wpa; Antonio Alkana; Kyle Appel; Roscoe Engel; Brent Stevens	39.66	Agn-I; Eckhard Rossouw; Llewellyn Kruger; Keenen Michau; Emile Erasmus	40.54	Wpa-I; Yusuf Ismail; Kurt Cameron; Ethan Nobel; Jonathan Dreyer	41.47
4 × 400 m relay	Agn; PC Beneke; Le Roux Hamman; Ofentse Mogawane; LJ Van Zyl	3:10.11	Agn-I; Tapelo Phora; Koketso Ramasita; Tshegfatso Mothopa; Christian Lubbe	3:13.55	Afs; Treasure Derison; Bennie Prinsloo; Hannes Naude; Braam Van Tubbergh	3:16.12
High jump	Mpho Links	2.23 m	Keegan Fourie	2.15 m	Chris Moleya	2.15 m
Pole vault	Cheyne Rahme	5.20 m	Eben Beukes	5.10 m	Heinrich Smit	5.10 m
Long jump	Ruswahl Samaai	8.38 m (+1.4) PB	Duwayne Boer	7.80 m (+4.6)	Koketso Mogapi	7.71 m (+0.1)
Triple jump	Godfrey Khotso Mokoena	16.63 m (+1.5)	Jayson Sewenyana	15.92 m (+0.3)	Kwezi Mtoba	15.47 m (+0.7)
Shot put	Orazio Cremona	20.49 m	Jaco Engelbrecht	20.45 m	Nico Grobler	17.51 m
Discus throw	Victor Hogan	62.86 m	Russell Tucker	62.18 m	Brynn-Peter Kemp	56.23 m
Hammer throw	Chris Harmse	71.98 m	Johan Kruger	63.39 m	Tshepang Makhete	60.79 m
Javelin throw	Rocco van Rooyen	77.96 m	Chad Herman	73.14 m	Tobie Holtzhauzen	70.56 m
Decathlon	Gert Swanepoel	6818 pts	Lee Van Den Berg	6763 pts	Nardus Greyling	6635 pts

=== Women ===
Event	Gold		Silver		Bronze	
100 metres (wind: -2.1 m/s)	Carina Horn	11.40	Tsholofelo Thipe	11.81	Tamzin Thomas	11.83
200 metres (wind: -2.2 m/s)	Justine Palframan	23.26	Melissa Hewitt	24.03	Margaret Olwoch	24.15
400 metres	Justine Palframan	52.49	Rorisang Ramonnye	53.36	Jeanelle Griesel	53.38
800 metres	Caster Semenya	2:05.05	Lebogang Phalula	2:05.89	Mandie Brandt	2:06.30
1500 metres	Dina Lebo Phalula	4:14.43	Lebogang Phalula	4:17.33	Thineke Fourie	4:21.43
5000 metres	Dina Lebo Phalula	16:19.72	Nolene Conrad	16:24.24	Glenrose Xaba	16:42.72
10,000 metres	Nolene Conrad	34:26.63	Glenrose Xaba	34:59.20	Mpho Mabuza	35:19.51
20 km walk	Anel Oosthuizen	1:38:03	Cornelia Swart	1:42:07	Zelda Schultz	1:48:29
100 m hurdles (wind: +0.9 m/s)	Claudia Heunis	13.36	Kayla Gilbert	13.91	Lizzy Kriel	14.16
400 m hurdles	Wenda Nel	55.27	Anneri Ebersohn	57.79	Jean-Marie Senekal	58.58
3000 m steeplechase	Thembi Baloyi	10:28.33	Jeanette Bokadi	10:40.40	Cherise Sims	11:01.24
4 × 100 metres relay	Agn-I (B); Stacey Welsch; Adri Schoeman; Simone Du Plooy; Cherese Jones	45.96	Agn (A); Carina Etsebeth; Margaret Olwoch; Claudia Heunis; Carina Horn	46.26	Agn-I (A); Claudine Jansen Van Rensburg; Julette Speek; Soandri Meyer; Welme Van Zyl	46.35
4 × 400 metres relay	Agn I Anuscha Nice; Anneri Ebersohn; Jeanelle Griesel; Wenda Nel	3:35.57	Bola; Jean-Marie Senekal; Gezelle Magerman; Robyn Haupt; Justine Palframan	3:40.12	Wpa; Rozelle Meier; Pamela Moyikwa; Alice Adeolu; Sonja Van Der Merwe	3:44.83
High jump	Julia Du Plessis	1.80 m	Bianca Erwee	1.75 m	Geraldine King	1.75 m
Pole vault	Marileze Vos	3.60 m	Carla Werth	3.50 m	Dominique Mann	3.40 m
Long jump	Lynique Prinsloo	6.55 m	Carla Marais	6.53 m	Zinzi Chabangu	6.32 m
Triple jump	Patience Ntshingila	13.32 m (+1.0)	Matsie Dikotla	13.18 m (+0.9)	Zinzi Chabangu	13.14 m (-0.8)
Shot put	Ischke Senekal	15.51 m	Geraldene Duvenhage	15.47 m	Sonia Smuts	15.22 m
Discus throw	Geraldene Duvenhage	53.00 m	Ischke Senekal	49.54 m	Leandrie Geel	46.44 m
Hammer throw	Margo Chene Coetzee	52.64 m	Letitia Janse Van Vuuren	50.72 m	Stefanie Greyling	49.12 m
Javelin throw	Sunette Viljoen	64.14 m	Jo-Ane van Dyk	49.83 m	Megan Wilke	47.87 m
Heptathlon	June Roelofse	4809 pts	Helene Peens	4393 pts	Jolanda Loubser	3495 pts

== See also ==
- South African Athletics Championships
  - 2019 South African Athletics Championships
