= 2019 South African Athletics Championships =

- Dates: 25–27 April 2019
- Host city: Germiston
- Venue: Germiston Stadium
- Events: 42

The 2019 South African Athletics Championships was the 109th edition of the national championship in outdoor track and field for South Africa. It was held on 25–27 April at the Germiston Stadium in Germiston. It served as the selection meeting for South Africa at the 2019 World Athletics Championships.

== Results ==
=== Men ===
Event	Gold		Silver		Bronze	
100 metres	Simon Magakwe	10.05 s	Thando Dlodlo	10.15 s	Chederick van Wyk	10.27 s
200 metres	Akani Simbine	20.27 s	Chederick van Wyk	20.64 s	Theodore Young	20.71 s
400 metres	Gardeo Isaacs	45.39	Thapelo Phora	45.67 s	Ashley Hlungwani	45.76 s
800 metres	Kabelo Simon Mohlosi	1:47.40 min	Reinhardt van Rensburg	1:47.44 min	Theuns Ehlers	1:47.55 min
1500 metres	Ryan Mphahlele	3:43.60 min	Nkosinathi Sibiya	3:45.50 min	Flavio Sehohle	3:46.32 min
5000 metres	Lesiba Precious Mashele	14:06.18 min	Philani Buthelezi	14:13.10 min	Desmond Mokgobu	14:16.04 min
10,000 metres	Philani Buthelezi	29:21.71 min	Regan Magwai	29:46.64 min	Mokofane Milton Kekana	29:57.77 min
110 m hurdles	Antonio Alkana	13.38 s	Ruan de Vries	13.55 s	Tiaan Kleynhans	13.86 s
400 m hurdles	Lindsay Hanekom	48.81 s	Sokwakhana Zazini	49.33 s	Cornel Fredericks	49.87 s
3000 m s'chase	Rantso Mokopane	8:59.17 min	Dikotsi Lekopa	9:02.73 min	Tumisang Monnatlala	9:15.72 min
4 × 100 m relay	South Africa	39.35 s	Athletics Gauteng North	40.03 s	Eastern Province Athletics	40.73 s
4 × 400 m relay	Athletics Gauteng North	3:04.26 min	Athletics Central North West	3:07.75 min	Boland Athletics	3:09.91 min
20 km walk	Wayne Snyman	1:30:17 h	Sizwe Ndebele	1:32:23 h	Tumisang Pule	1:32:42 h
High jump	Mpho Links	2.25 m	Keegan Fourie	2.20 m	Breyton Poole	2.15 m
Pole vault	Valko van Wyk	5.10 m	Nikolai Hendrik van Huyssteen	4.90 m	Kyle Rademeyer	4.80 m
Long jump	Luvo Manyonga	8.35 m	Ruswahl Samaai	8.21 m	Zarck Visser	8.01 m
Triple jump	Godfrey Khotso Mokoena	16.81 m	Menzi Mthembu	16.00 m	Sefako Mokhosoa	15.77 m
Shot put	Orazio Cremona	21.51 m	Kyle Blignaut	20.03 m	Zane Weir	19.09 m
Discus throw	Victor Hogan	60.20 m	Werner Visser	58.04 m	Johan Scholtz	54.55 m
Hammer throw	Tshepang Makhethe	72.25 m	Chris Harmse	71.70 m	Allan Cumming	68.79 m
Javelin throw	Rocco van Rooyen	77.82 m	Johan Grobler	76.97 m	Tobie Holtzhausen	70.49 m
Decathlon	Fredriech Pretorius	7812 pts	Duncan McGladdery	6825 pts	Marcelle de Jager	6651 pts

=== Women ===
Event	Gold		Silver		Bronze	
100 metres	Tebogo Mamathu	11.45 s	Rose Xeyi	11.61 s	Reabetswe Moloi	11.78 s
200 metres	Tamzin Thomas	23.64 s	Ariane Nel	24.17 s	Petunia Obisi	24.30 s
400 metres	Danel Holton	54.03 s	Kirsten Ahrens	54.60 s	Marlie Viljoen	54.67 s
800 metres	Prudence Sekgodiso	2:05.06 min	Gena Löfstrand	2:05.11 min	Niene Muller	2:06.21 min
1500 metres	Caster Semenya	4:13.59 min	Carmie Prinsloo	4:29.55 min	Nicole Louw	4:32.47 min
5000 metres	Caster Semenya	16:05.97 min	Dominique Scott	16:13.71 min	Kesa Molotsane	16:25.23 min
10,000 metres	Glenrose Xaba	35:08.92 min	Carmie Prinsloo	36:10.21 min	Cherise Sims	36:24.20 min
100 m hurdles	Taylon Bieldt	13.63 s	Antionette van der Merwe	13.83 s	Janke van Wyk	13.95 s
400 m hurdles	Zenéy van der Walt	55.93 s	Wenda Nel	56.07 s	Rogail Joseph	58.43 s
3000 m s'chase	Kirsty Bell	10:45.25 min	Carlyn Fischer	10:55.46 min	Vuyiseka Nkumenge	10:56.02 min
4 × 100 m relay	South Africa	44.92 s	Athletics Gauteng North	47.00 s	Central Gauteng Athletics	49.10 s
4 × 400 m relay	Athletics Gauteng North A	3:36.41 min	Athletics Gauteng North B	3:44.43 min	Athletics Central North West	3:45.00 min
20 km walk	Anel Oosthuizen	1:40:22 h	Zelda Schultz	1:48:36 h	Annette Koen	1:53:32 h
High jump	Julia du Plessis	1.80 m	Kristi Snyman	1.80 m	Brittany Uys	1.75 m
Pole vault	Mirè Reinstorf	3.80 m	Esli Lamley	3.70 m	Nicole Janse van Rensburg	4.50 m
Long jump	Lynique Beneke	6.64 m	Eljonè Kruger	6.61 m	Zinzi Chabangu	6.55 m
Triple jump	Zinzi Chabangu	13.42 m	Patience Ntshingila	13.29 m	Maruska Janse van Rensburg	12.59 m
Shot put	Ischke Senekal	16.80 m	Meike Strydom	15.55 m	Sonia Smuts	14.56 m
Discus throw	Ischke Senekal	55.72 m	Yolandi Stander	53.32 m	Leandri Geel	49.00 m
Hammer throw	Margo Chene Pretorius	61.89 m	Marga Cumming	61.27 m	Stefanie Greyling	57.24 m
Javelin throw	Sunette Viljoen	57.23 m	Jo-Ane van Dyk	54.09 m	Jana van Schalkwyk	51.29 m
Heptathlon	Anri Salim	4843 pts	Shannon Verster	4731 pts	Geraldine King	4433 pts

== See also ==
- South African Athletics Championships
  - 2015 South African Athletics Championships
