= Prudence Sekgodiso =

South African middle-distance runner (born 2002)

Prudence Sekgodiso OLY
Personal information
- Full name: Prudence Tebogo Sekgodiso
- Nationality: South Africa
- Born: 5 January 2002 (age 24) Medingen Village, Limpopo, South Africa
- Education: TuksSport High School
- Height: 157 cm (5 ft 2 in)
- Weight: 44 kg (97 lb)

Sport
- Sport: Athletics
- Events: 800 metres 1500 metres
- University team: University of Pretoria
- Coached by: Samuel Sepeng

Achievements and titles
- National finals: 2016 South African U16s; • 1500 m, 3rd (bronze); 2019 South African Champs; • 800 m, 1st (gold); 2021 South African Champs; • 800 m, 1st (gold); 2022 South African Champs; • 1500 m, 1st (gold); • 800 m, 1st (gold); 2023 South African Champs; • 1500 m, 1st (gold); • 800 m, 1st (gold)
- Personal bests: 600m: 1:33:34 (Pretoria 2017); 800m: 1:57:16 (Ostrava 2025); 800m short: 1:58:40 NR (Nanjing 2025); 1500 m: 4:09.88 (Gaborone 2022); 5000m: 16:02:04 (Pietermaritzburg 2024)
Medal record
Women's athletics
Representing South Africa
World Indoor Championships
Gold medal – first place	2025 Nanjing	800 metres
African Youth Games
Bronze medal – third place	2018 Algiers	800 m
African U18 Championships
Gold medal – first place	2019 Abidjan	800 m
African Championships
Bronze medal – third place	2022 Port Louis	800 m
- Updated on 24 June 2025

Prudence Tebogo Sekgodiso OLY (born 5 January 2002), also spelled Prudence Sekgodisa, is a South African middle-distance runner specializing in the 800 metres. She was the gold medalist in the 800 m at the 2019 African U18 Championships. She is also a five-time South African Athletics Championships winner in the 1500 m and 800 m.

Sekgodiso won South Africa's first women's indoor medal and set the national indoor record in the 800 metres with a time of 1:58:40 at the 2025 World Athletics Indoor Championships in Nanjing, China.

== Personal life ==
Sekgodiso is from Medingen Village, Limpopo and trains in Gauteng, South Africa where she attended TuksSport High School, a sports-focused high school that allows learners to train and travel internationally whilst staying in school.

Following her success, Sekgodiso was frequently compared and criticized on social media alongside Caster Semenya, the Olympic champion 800 m runner from South Africa who is intersex and has since been restricted from running the women's 800 m by World Athletics unless she reduces her natural testosterone. Sekgodiso, who is not intersex, said that although she does not like the criticism, there is "nothing [she] can do about social media". She told BBC Sport Africa that compatriot Semenya is a hero of hers, and the comparisons "bring too much pressure"; Sekgodiso was confident in her abilities but wants to be seen as "the first Prudence, not the next Caster."

== Career ==
Sekgodiso earned her first international medal at the 2018 African Youth Games, winning a bronze in the 800 m behind gold medalist Hirut Meshesha. Following that at the 2018 Summer Youth Olympics, Sekgodiso finished 6th overall in Stage 1 but was disqualified from her Stage 2 heat.

At the 2019 World Cross Country Championships U20 race, Sekgodiso finished 20th overall in 22:15, leading South Africa to a 5th-place team finish. The following month in Abidjan, Sekgodiso won her first gold medal at the 2019 African U18 Championships in Athletics.

In 2022, Sekgodiso won a bronze medal at the 2022 African Championships in Athletics in the 800 metres, despite cold weather hampering her performance. At the 2022 World Championships 800 m, Sekgodiso advanced out of the heats, but was drawn the fastest of three semifinals. After finishing 5th in her semifinal with a 2:00.01 time, she did not advance to the finals. The following month at the Commonwealth Games, Sekgodiso again did not qualify for the finals with a 2:00.17 clocking in her heat.

Sekgodiso helped her team to a 4th-place finish in the mixed relay at the 2023 World Cross Country Championships. South Africa finished behind a winning Kenyan team anchored by Brenda Chebet, who was later that year suspended for doping. Sekgodiso qualified to compete at the 2023 World Championships in the 800 m, where she advanced past the first round but was beset by drama in the following stage. Sekgodiso collided with Athing Mu in their semifinal, turning the defending champion around backwards and forcing her to make up significant ground to qualify. Sekgodiso also was impacted by the collision, finishing last place in 2:11.68. The Athletics South Africa federation filed a protest to advance Sekgodiso into the finals, but it was not successful.

Sekgodiso won her first Diamond League title on 19 May 2024, when she won the 800 m in Marrakech in 1:57.26. It was also the fastest time of the year in the world up to that point, as well as a new personal best. Sekgodiso placed 8th in the final of the 800m at the Paris Olympics in 1:58.79.

In her indoor debut, she set the South African women’s Short Track 800 m national record with a time 2:02.30 at the Belgrade Indoor Meeting in Belgrade, Serbia.

== Statistics ==
=== Best performances ===
Event	Mark	Place	Competition	Venue	Date	Ref
800 metres	1:57.16	1st place, gold medalist(s)	Diamond League	Ostrava Golden Spike	24 June 2025	
1500 metres	4:09.88 A	1st place, gold medalist(s)	Gaborone International Meet	Gaborone, Botswana	30 April 2022	
800 metres	1:58.40	1st place, gold medalist(s)	World Indoor Championships	Nanjing, China	23 March 2025	
