= 2002 African Championships in Athletics – Men's hammer throw =

The men's hammer throw event at the 2002 African Championships in Athletics was held in Radès, Tunisia on August 7.

== Results ==
Rank	Name	Nationality	Result	Notes
1st place, gold medalist(s)	Chris Harmse	South Africa	76.07	CR
2nd place, silver medalist(s)	Yamine Hussein Abdel Moneim	Egypt	69.19	
3rd place, bronze medalist(s)	Saber Souid	Tunisia	68.40	
4	Ahmed Abderraouf	Egypt	66.16	
5	Nicolas Li Yun Fong	Mauritius	58.35	
6	Nabil Amroun	Algeria	57.83	
	Samir Haouam	Algeria	NM	
	Mohsen El Anany	Egypt	DNS	
