= 2024 African Championships in Athletics – Men's hammer throw =

Men's hammer throw at the 2024 African Championships in Athletics
- Venue: Japoma Stadium
- Location: Douala, Cameroon
- Dates: 25 June
- Competitors: 11 from 7 nations
- Winning distance: 72.88 m

Medalists
gold medal	Mostafa El Gamel	Egypt
silver medal	Ahmed Tarek Ismail	Egypt
bronze medal	Allan Cumming	South Africa

The men's hammer throw event at the 2024 African Championships in Athletics was held on 25 June in Douala, Cameroon.

== Records ==
Records before the 2024 African Athletics Championships
Record	Athlete (nation)	Distance (m)	Location	Date
World record	Yuriy Sedykh (URS)	86.74	Stuttgart, West Germany	30 August 1986
African record	Mostafa El Gamel (EGY)	81.27	Cairo, Egypt	21 March 2014
Championship record	Mostafa El Gamel (EGY)	79.09	Marrakesh, Morocco	13 August 2014
World leading	Ethan Katzberg (CAN)	84.38	Nairobi, Kenya	20 April 2024
African leading	Mostafa El Gamel (EGY)	74.35	Cairo, Egypt	2 May 2024

== Results ==
Rank	Athlete	Nationality	#1	#2	#3	#4	#5	#6	Result	Notes
1st place, gold medalist(s)	Mostafa El Gamel	Egypt	x	65.13	65.78	69.93	70.15	72.88	72.88	
2nd place, silver medalist(s)	Ahmed Tarek Ismail	Egypt	x	70.18	70.71	70.18	x	x	70.71	
3rd place, bronze medalist(s)	Allan Cumming	South Africa	62.72	65.50	67.35	x	69.43	x	69.43	
4	Mohsen Anani	Tunisia	67.32	67.33	x	69.20	x	68.91	69.20	
5	Tshepang Makhethe	South Africa	65.21	x	x	67.16	68.58	67.10	68.58	
6	Dominic Ongidi Abunda	Kenya	x	54.01	57.39	x	58.22	x	58.22	
7	Mintestot Abebe	Ethiopia	44.23	46.91	41.17	47.73	47.41	46.72	47.73	
8	Don Wittz	Seychelles	x	x	44.69	42.42	44.58	41.45	44.69	
9	Chucho Kebede	Ethiopia	41.86	44.33	x				44.33	
10	Abreham Biruk	Ethiopia	x	x	41.22				41.22	
11	Billy Jospen Takougoum Kuitche	Cameroon	x	x	22.05				22.05	
	Kenya Sei	Sierra Leone							DNS	

== See also ==
- Athletics at the 2023 African Games – Men's hammer throw
