= 2026 African Championships in Athletics – Men's hammer throw =

Men's hammer throw at the 2026 African Championships in Athletics
- Venue: Legon Sports Stadium
- Location: Accra, Ghana
- Dates: 16 May
- Competitors: 7 from 6 nations
- Winning time: 72.58

Medalists
| gold medal | Mostafa El Gamel | Egypt |
| silver medal | Ahmed Tarek Ismail | Egypt |
| bronze medal | Tshepang Makhethe | South Africa |

The men's hammer throw event at the 2026 African Championships in Athletics was held on 16 May in Accra, Ghana.

== Results ==
| Rank | Athlete | Nationality | #1 | #2 | #3 | #4 | #5 | #6 | Result | Notes |
|---|---|---|---|---|---|---|---|---|---|---|
| 1st place, gold medalist(s) | Mostafa El Gamel | Egypt | | | | | | | 72.58 | |
| 2nd place, silver medalist(s) | Ahmed Tarek Ismail | Egypt | | | | | | | 68.27 | |
| 3rd place, bronze medalist(s) | Tshepang Makhethe | South Africa | | | | | | | 67.27 | |
| 4 | Dominic Ongidi Abunda | Kenya | | | | | | | 62.69 | |
| 5 | Jean Ian Carre | Mauritius | | | | | | | 48.16 | |
| 6 | Mintesnot Abebe | Ethiopia | | | | | | | 47.80 | |
| | Mohsen Anani | Tunisia | | | | | | | NM | |
