= Glenrose Xaba =

South African long-distance runner

Personal information
- Born: 31 December 1994 (age 31) Embalenhle, South Africa

Sport
- Country: South Africa
- Sport: Long-distance running
- Coached by: Caster Semenya

Achievements and titles
- Personal bests: 800m: 2:08.88 (Pretoria 2024) 1 500m: 4:13.50 (Pretoria 2026); 3 000m: 9:07.63 (Cape Town 2023); 5 000m: 15:10.62 (Maisons-Laffitte 2025); 5 km: 15:27 (Durban 2025); 10 000m: 31:26.78 (London 2024); 10 km 31:12;NR (Durban 2024) Half marathon: 1:07:03 (Istanbul 2026); Marathon: 2:22:22;NR (Cape Town 2023)

Glenrose Xaba (born 31 December 1994) is a South African long-distance runner. In 2018, she won the SPAR Grand Prix 10 km series. She competed in the senior women's race at the 2019 IAAF World Cross Country Championships held in Aarhus, Denmark, where she finished in 67th place. In 2024, she won the SPAR Grand Prix 10 km series and defended the title in 2025 winning all 5 races to become the first South African athlete to win all five races in the Grand Prix.

In 2024 she broke the 10km national record with a time of 31:12 as well as the marathon record with a time of 2:22:22.

== Career ==
She competed in the junior women's race at the 2013 IAAF World Cross Country Championships held in Bydgoszcz, Poland.

In 2017, she competed in the senior women's race at the IAAF World Cross Country Championships held in Kampala, Uganda. She finished in 64th place. In 2018, she competed in the senior women's race at the African Cross Country Championships held in Chlef, Algeria. She won the SPAR Grand Prix 10 km series.

She competed in the women's half marathon at the 2020 World Athletics Half Marathon Championships held in Gdynia, Poland.

She was not able to qualify for the 2020 Summer Olympics in Tokyo, Japan due to injury.

On 20 October 2024, she set a new national record as she won the Cape Town Marathon in a time of 2:22:22. In 2025 she improved on her 5 km personal best running 15:27 in Durban to win the Boxer Super Run Durban race.

=== South African National Championships ===
In 2015, she won the silver medal in the women's 10,000 metres at the South African Athletics Championships held in Stellenbosch, South Africa. She also won the bronze medal in the women's 5000 metres event. In 2016, she competed in the women's 10,000 metres event at the African Championships in Athletics held in Durban, South Africa.

In 2024 she won the 10 000m and 5 000m at the National Senior Combined Events and Relays Championships.

In 2025 she won her eighth South African 10 km Championship title.

=== Absa Run Your City ===
In July 2024, she came fourth at the Absa Run Your City Durban 10 km and broke the national record with a time of 31:12.

In August 2024, she won the Absa Run Your City Joburg 10 km with a time of 32:53. In September 2024, she set a course record at the Absa Run Your City Joburg 10 km with a time of 31:55. She defended the Tshwane title in 2025 with a time of 31:50.

=== SPAR Grand Prix ===
In October 2024, she won the Joburg leg, the final leg, of the SPAR Grand Prix in a time of 32:48. She was declared the overall Grand Prix winner after winning four out of five races in the series. She defended her title in 2025 this time winning all five races to become the first South African athlete to win all races in a single year.

== Achievements ==
All information taken from World Athletics profile.

=== International competitions ===
Year	Competition	Venue	Position	Event	Notes
Representing South Africa
2020	World Championships (HM)	Gdynia, Poland	16th	Half marathon	1:09:26

=== National titles ===
Year	Competition	Venue	Position	Event	Notes
2015	South African U23 Championships	Stellenbosch	1st	10 000m	
2015	South African U23 Championships	Stellenbosch	1st	5 000m	
2016	South African U23 Championships		1st	10 000m	
2016	South African U23 Championships		1st	5 000m	
2016	South African Championships		1st	10 000m	
2017	South African Championships		1st	10 000m	
2019	South African Championships		1st	10 000m	
2019	South African Road Running Championships		1st	10 km	
2021	South African Championships		1st	10 000m	
2022	South African Championships		1st	10 000m	
2022	South African 10k Championship	Rustenburg	1st	10 km	
2023	South African 10k Championship	Mbombela	1st	10 km	
2024	South African Road Running Championships	Johannesburg	1st	Half marathon	
2025	South African Championships	Potchefstroom	1st	5 000m	
2025	South African 10k Championship	Cape Town	1st	10 km	
2025	South African Road Running Championships	Phalaborwa	1st	Half marathon	
