= Phethisang Makhethe =

South African athlete (born 2000)

Personal information
- Nationality: South African
- Born: 5 September 2002 (age 23)

Sport
- Sport: Athletics
- Event: Hammer throw

Achievements and titles
- Personal bests: Hammer throw: 68.66 m (2026) NR
Medal record
Women's athletics
Representing South Africa
African Youth Games
Silver medal – second place	2018 Algiers	Hammer

Phethisang Makhethe (born 5 September 2002) is a South African hammer thrower. She became the South African national record holder in 2022, and regained the record again in 2025 with a throw of 68.66 metres while competing in the United States.

== Biography ==
Makhethe was a silver medallist at the 2018 African Youth Games in Algiers.

Makhethe threw a South African national record of 65.80m in the hammer throw competing in the United States in April 2022, although the record was broken the following year by Leandri Geel. In April 2024, she placed third in the hammer throw at the South African Athletics Championships in Pietermaritzburg.

Makhethe finished third in the weight throw at the 2025 NCAA Division I Indoor Track and Field Championships in Virginia Beach with a best throw of 23.08 metres. Makhethe broke the South African women's hammer throw record competing for the University of Illinois at the Big Ten Championships in Eugene, Oregon in May 2025, placing second in the competition with a throw of 68.66 metres. The throw was a personal best by two metres, having thrown 66.80m in Illinois early that month, and added 71 centimetres to the previous national record.

In February 2026 at the Big Ten Indoor Championships in Indianapolis, she set an Illinois school record of 23.70m in winning the weight throw. She was runner-up in the weight throw at the 2026 NCAA Indoor Championships, finishing behind Anthonett Nabwe. In May, she placed second to Nabwe in the hammer throw with 68.42m at the Big Ten Championships.
