= Athletics at the African Youth Games =

Athletics at a multi-sport competition

Athletics is one of the sports at the quadrennial African Youth Games competition. It has been one of the sports competed at the event since the inaugural edition in 2010.

Four athletes have achieved two athletics gold medals in the same Games: Tinashe Mutanga in the 100 m and 200 m (2010), Charkad Jaber Said in the hammer and javelin throws (2010), Rosemary Chukwuma in the 100 m and 200 m (2018), and Gontse Morake in the 400 m hurdles and triple jump (2018).

== Editions ==
Games	Year	Host city	Host country	Main venue	Events		Best nation
Games	Year	Host city	Host country	Main venue	Men	Women	Best nation
I	2010	Rabat	Morocco		18	18	Tunisia (TUN)
II	2014	Gaborone	Botswana		20	20	Ethiopia (ETH)
III	2018	Algiers	Algeria		20	20	South Africa (RSA)
IV	2026	Maseru	Lesotho				

== Events ==
As of the most recent 2018 edition, the athletics program features 20 men's and 20 women's events.

Event	2010	2014	2018	Games
Current program
100 m	M/W	M/W	M/W	6
200 m	M/W	M/W	M/W	6
400 m	M/W	M/W	M/W	6
800 m		M/W	M/W	4
1000 m	M/W			2
1500 m		M/W	M/W	4
3000 m	M/W	M/W	M/W	6
100 m hurdles (76.2 cm)	W	W	W	3
110 m hurdles (91.4 cm)	M	M	M	3
400 m hurdles (84 cm)	M	M	M	3
400 m hurdles	W	W	W	3
2000 m steeplechase	M/W	M/W	M/W	6
4 × 100 m relay	M/W	M/W	M/W	6
4 × 400 m relay	M/W	M/W	M/W	6
5000 m walk		W	W	2
10,000 m walk		M	M	2
High jump	M/W	M/W	M/W	6
Pole vault	M/W	M/W	M/W	6
Long jump	M/W	M/W	M/W	6
Triple jump	M/W	M/W	M/W	6
Shot put (5kg)	M	M	M	3
Shot put (3kg)	W	W	W	3
Discus throw (1.5kg)	M	M	M	3
Discus throw	W	W	W	3
Hammer throw (5kg)	M	M	M	3
Hammer throw (3kg)	W	W	W	3
Javelin throw (700g)	M	M	M	3
Javelin throw (500g)	W	W	W	3
Events	36	40	40	

== All-time medal table ==
Updated after the 2018 African Youth Games

Rank	Nation	Gold	Silver	Bronze	Total
1	South Africa (RSA)	19	13	6	38
2	Ethiopia (ETH)	17	7	6	30
3	Egypt (EGY)	14	9	5	28
4	Nigeria (NGR)	12	7	7	26
5	Kenya (KEN)	9	19	8	36
6	Tunisia (TUN)	9	6	4	19
7	Algeria (ALG)	5	7	5	17
8	Morocco (MAR)	4	10	15	29
9	Botswana (BOT)	4	3	8	15
10	Zimbabwe (ZIM)	2	1	2	5
11	Mauritius (MRI)	1	4	3	8
12	Zambia (ZAM)	1	2	2	5
13	Sudan (SUD)	1	1	1	3
14	The Gambia (GAM)	1	0	2	3
15	Uganda (UGA)	0	2	3	5
16	Ghana (GHA)	0	2	2	4
17	Senegal (SEN)	0	2	0	2
18	Cameroon (CMR)	0	1	2	3
18	Libya (LBA)	0	1	2	3
20	Eritrea (ERI)	0	1	0	1
21	Namibia (NAM)	0	0	3	3
22	Burundi (BDI)	0	0	2	2
22	Madagascar (MAD)	0	0	2	2
24	Djibouti (DJI)	0	0	1	1
24	Seychelles (SEY)	0	0	1	1
24	Togo (TOG)	0	0	1	1
Totals (26 entries)		99	98	93	290
