= Eslam Ahmed Ibrahim =

Egyptian hammer thrower

Medal record

Men's athletics

Representing Egypt

African Championships
Gold medal – first place	2016 Durban	Hammer throw

Eslam Ahmed Shabaan (born 23 July 1994) is an Egyptian track and field athlete who competes in the hammer throw. He holds a personal best of 70.33 m (230 ft 8 3/4 in). He was the gold medallist at the 2016 African Championships in Athletics.

He had a successful career in age category tournaments. He topped qualifying at the 2010 Summer Youth Olympics and, though he later ended sixth in the final, his throw of 73.42 m (240 ft 10 1/2 in) was the second best at the event. He placed fourth at the 2011 World Youth Championships in Athletics. In the junior category he was 21st at the 2012 World Junior Championships and was the winner at the 2013 African Junior Athletics Championships.

He entered the senior ranks in 2015 and cleared seventy metres for the first time in 2016.

== International competitions ==
Year	Competition	Venue	Position	Event	Notes
2010	Youth Olympic Games	Singapore	6th	Hammer throw	63.75 m
2011	World Youth Championships	Lille, France	4th	Hammer throw	72.35 m
2012	World Junior Championships	Barcelona, Spain	21st (q)	Hammer throw	68.80 m
2013	African Junior Championships	Bambous, Mauritius	1st	Hammer throw	74.49 m
2016	African Championships	Durban, South Africa	1st	Hammer throw	68.92 m
