= 2010 African Championships in Athletics – Men's hammer throw =

The men's hammer throw at the 2010 African Championships in Athletics was held on July 31.

== Results ==
| Rank | Athlete | Nationality | #1 | #2 | #3 | #4 | #5 | #6 | Result | Notes |
|---|---|---|---|---|---|---|---|---|---|---|
| 1st place, gold medalist(s) | Mohsen Mohamed Anani | Egypt | 71.75 | 71.76 | 72.00 | 73.00 | 74.72 | 71.26 | 74.72 | |
| 2nd place, silver medalist(s) | Chris Harmse | South Africa | X | 58.93 | X | X | 72.56 | X | 72.56 | |
| 3rd place, bronze medalist(s) | Mostafa Al-Gamel | Egypt | 69.58 | 71.40 | 69.50 | X | 70.28 | X | 71.40 | |
| 4 | Hassa Mahmoud Abdelgawad | Egypt | X | X | 60.22 | 68.43 | X | X | 68.43 | |
| 5 | Driss Barid | Morocco | 65.34 | 64.21 | 62.05 | 64.08 | 62.24 | X | 65.34 | |
| 6 | Osazuwa Osamudiame | Nigeria | X | 58.65 | X | 59.93 | 58.44 | 60.55 | 60.55 | |
| 7 | Ibrahim Baba | Nigeria | 54.36 | 55.10 | 56.31 | 53.91 | 56.07 | 54.47 | 56.31 | |
| 8 | Maurice Omoro Oudu | Kenya | 48.14 | 50.73 | 50.12 | 50.68 | X | X | 50.73 | SB |
| 9 | Sammy Bitok | Kenya | 46.59 | 48.76 | 48.60 | | | | 48.76 | |
| | Dennis Oseko Sakawa | Kenya | X | X | X | | | | NM | |
