= 2018 African Championships in Athletics – Men's hammer throw =

The men's hammer throw event at the 2018 African Championships in Athletics was held on 4 August in Asaba, Nigeria.

== Results ==
Rank	Athlete	Nationality	#1	#2	#3	#4	#5	#6	Result	Notes
1st place, gold medalist(s)	Mostafa Al-Gamel	Egypt	69.13	71.95	73.50	71.59	70.97	68.96	73.50	
2nd place, silver medalist(s)	Islam Mohamed	Egypt	70.32	69.24	x	65.94	x	67.87	70.32	
3rd place, bronze medalist(s)	Hassan Abdelgawad	Egypt	66.70	67.74	68.17	68.35	69.69	69.90	69.90	
4	Tshepang Makhethe	South Africa	x	67.03	x	68.79	x	68.81	68.81	
5	Chris Harmse	South Africa	66.43	x	67.72	68.71	x	66.24	68.71	
6	Allan Cumming	South Africa	62.33	66.11	x	67.37	65.96	65.28	67.37	
7	Dominic Abunda	Kenya	58.60	59.47	60.62	60.08	62.57	60.39	62.57	
