= 2014 African Championships in Athletics – Men's hammer throw =

The men's hammer throw event at the 2014 African Championships in Athletics was held on August 13 on Stade de Marrakech.

== Results ==
Rank	Athlete	Nationality	#1	#2	#3	#4	#5	#6	Result	Notes
1st place, gold medalist(s)	Mostafa Al-Gamel	Egypt	79.09	x	77.60	77.88	77.30	78.05	79.09	CR
2nd place, silver medalist(s)	Chris Harmse	South Africa	72.18	69.96	70.09	72.14	73.39	73.90	73.90	
3rd place, bronze medalist(s)	Driss Barid	Morocco	52.93	58.55	x	x	57.16	60.17	60.17	
4	Biruk Abraham	Ethiopia	45.96	x	46.12	x	x	x	46.12	NR
5	Dean William	Seychelles	42.70	44.08	x	44.90	x	46.08	46.08	
