= Athletics at the 2003 All-Africa Games – Men's hammer throw =

The men's hammer throw event at the 2003 All-Africa Games was held on October 11.

== Results ==
Rank	Name	Nationality	Result	Notes
1st place, gold medalist(s)	Chris Harmse	South Africa	75.17	GR
2nd place, silver medalist(s)	Saber Souid	Tunisia	70.81	
3rd place, bronze medalist(s)	Samir Haouam	Algeria	68.95	
4	Ahmed Abderraouf	Egypt	67.61	
5	Mohsen El Anany	Egypt	67.24	
6	Osazuwa Osamudiame	Nigeria	65.66	
7	Eric Opuwa	Nigeria	55.87	
