= 2016 African Championships in Athletics – Men's hammer throw =

The men's hammer throw event at the 2016 African Championships in Athletics was held on 25 June in Kings Park Stadium.

== Results ==
Rank	Athlete	Nationality	Result	Notes
1st place, gold medalist(s)	Eslam Ibrahim	Egypt	68.92	
2nd place, silver medalist(s)	Chris Harmse	South Africa	67.67	
3rd place, bronze medalist(s)	Tshepang Makhethe	South Africa	65.54	
4	Johan Kruger	South Africa	63.01	
5	Nicholas Li Yun Fong	Mauritius	58.54	
6	Georgio Vahoua	Ivory Coast	38.47	
