= 2022 African Championships in Athletics – Men's hammer throw =

The men's hammer throw event at the 2022 African Championships in Athletics was held on 8 June in Port Louis, Mauritius.

== Results ==
Rank	Athlete	Nationality	#1	#2	#3	#4	#5	#6	Result	Notes
1st place, gold medalist(s)	Allan Cumming	South Africa	57.23	60.69	64.39	x	68.04	69.13	69.13	
2nd place, silver medalist(s)	Tshepang Makhethe	South Africa	65.35	65.92	64.37	64.79	68.75	64.23	68.75	
3rd place, bronze medalist(s)	Alaaeldin Elashry	Egypt	66.13	66.38	67.46	66.53	68.24	67.93	68.24	
4	Mostafa El Gamel	Egypt	63.94	65.64	65.15	65.89	67.80	67.26	67.80	
5	Ahmed Tarek Ismail	Egypt	x	x	62.42	65.32	65.22	65.73	65.73	
6	Renaldo Frechou	South Africa	60.95	62.37	60.07	61.60	64.24	62.24	64.24	
7	Jean Ian Carre	Mauritius	50.66	x	x	51.75	x	50.26	51.75	
8	Dominic Ondigi	Kenya	49.32	51.65	x	49.90	50.60	x	51.65	
