= 2004 African Championships in Athletics – Men's hammer throw =

The men's hammer throw event at the 2004 African Championships in Athletics was held in Brazzaville, Republic of the Congo on July 15.

== Results ==
Rank	Name	Nationality	Result	Notes
1st place, gold medalist(s)	Chris Harmse	South Africa	75.90	
2nd place, silver medalist(s)	Saber Souid	Tunisia	70.71	
3rd place, bronze medalist(s)	Ahmed Abderraouf	Egypt	67.87	
4	Samir Haouam	Algeria	66.48	
5	Nicolas Li Yun Fong	Mauritius	59.88	
