= 2012 African Championships in Athletics – Men's hammer throw =

The men's hammer throw at the 2012 African Championships in Athletics was held at the Stade Charles de Gaulle on 30 June.

== Medalists ==
Gold	Chris Harmse; South Africa
Silver	Mohsen Mohamed Anani; Egypt
Bronze	Mostafa Al-Gamel; Egypt

== Records ==
Standing records prior to the 2012 African Championships in Athletics
World record	Yuriy Sedykh (URS)	86.74	Stuttgart, West Germany	30 August 1986
African record	Chris Harmse (RSA)	80.63	Durban, South Africa	15 April 2005
Championship record	Chris Harmse (RSA)	77.72	Addis Ababa, Ethiopia	3 May 2008

== Schedule ==
Date	Time	Round
30 June 2012	14:30	Final

== Results ==
=== Final ===
Rank	Athlete	Nationality	#1	#2	#3	#5	#5	#6	Result	Notes
1st place, gold medalist(s)	Chris Harmse	South Africa	x	x	72.78	74.63	77.22	74.26	77.22	
2nd place, silver medalist(s)	Mohsen Mohamed Anani	Egypt	x	74.27	72.96	73.92	74.31	73.77	74.31	
3rd place, bronze medalist(s)	Mostafa Al-Gamel	Egypt	71.63	73.81	x	x	69.57	71.49	73.81	
	Driss Barid	Morocco	x	x	x	x	x	x	NM	
