= Tayla Kavanagh =

South African long-distance runner (born 2001)

Personal information
- Born: 5 May 2001 (age 25)

Sport
- Sport: Athletics
- Events: Middle-distance running, Long-distance running, Cross country running

Tayla Kavanagh (born 5 May 2001) is a South African middle- and long-distance and cross country runner. She is a multiple-time national champion.

== Biography ==
Kavanagh attended St Mary’s Diocesan School for Girls in Kloof, Durban.

A member of Hollywood Athletics Club, she is sponsored by Adidas. Having recovered from injuries which derailed much of her 2023 and 2024 seasons, Kavanagh won the Sanlam Peace Run 10km in Cape Town in 2024 and 2025, in the later race improving her personal best by 16 seconds to set the fastest time by a South African woman in the year, with 31:41. She had also represented South Africa at the 2024 World Athletics Cross Country Championships in Belgrade and the World Road Running Championships, having also ran for South Africa at the inaugural 2023 World Athletics Road Running Championships in Riga, where she finished 15th in the 5km in 15:50.

In March 2026, she set a new personal best at the Spar Women’s 10km Challenge in Cape Town, running 31:33. In April, competing at the South African Athletics Championships in Stellenbosch, she claimed titles over both 5000 metres and 10,000 metres. She won the 5000 metres in a personal best time of 14:58.52, to become the third South African woman to break 15 minutes for the distance after Elana Meyer and Dominique Scott.

Kavanagh placed eighth over 5000 metres at the 2026 Commonwealth Games in Glasgow, running a personal best 14:58.49. In September 2026, she won the Durban 10k, setting a new course record of 31:39, despite being tripped in the opening stages. She represented South Africa in the 5k at the 2026 World Athletics Road Running Championships in Copenhagen in September 2026, finishing fourth in a personal best time of 14:51.
