= Adriaan Wildschutt =

South African long-distance runner

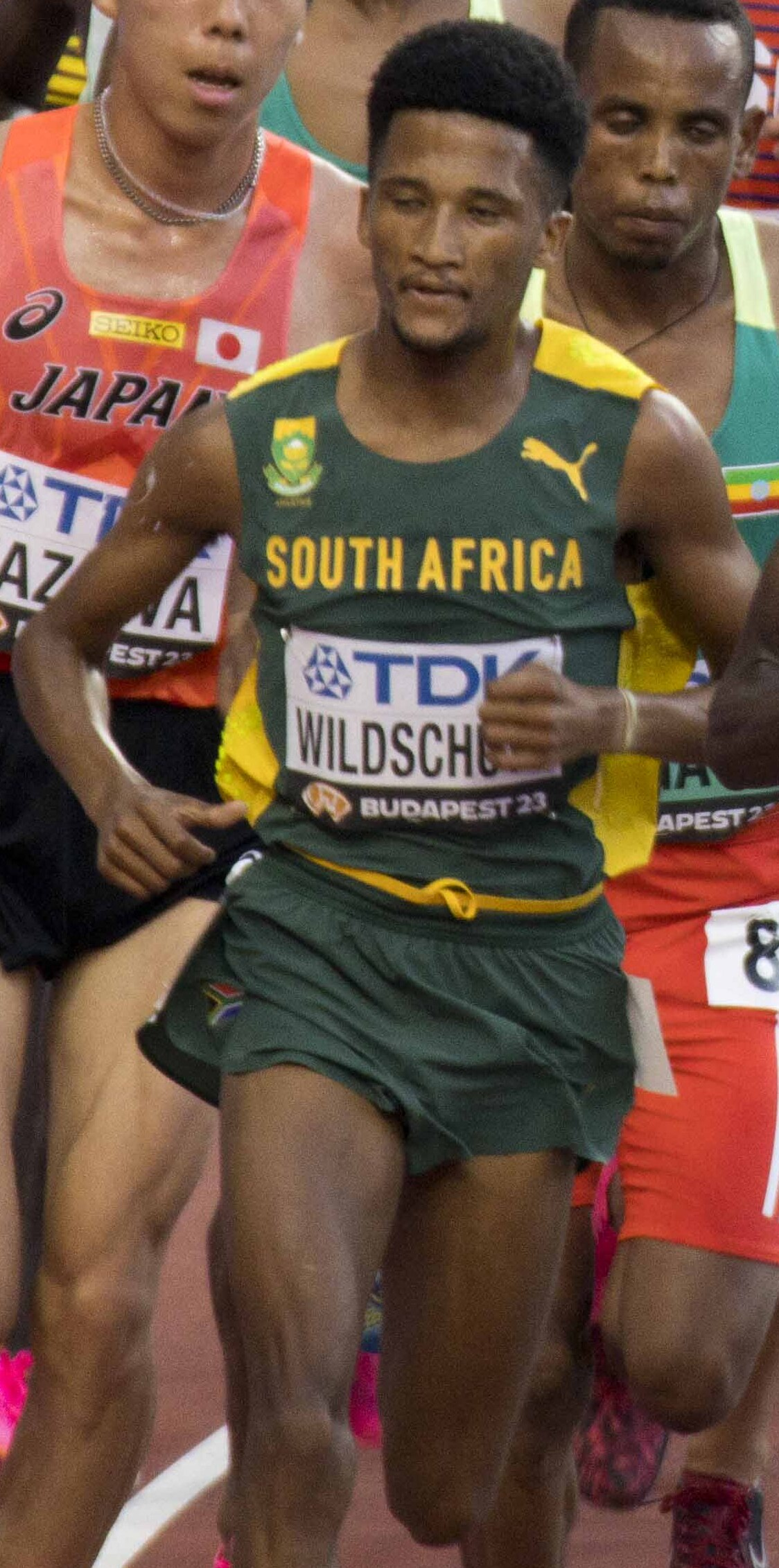
- Adriaan Wildschutt in 2023

Personal information
- Born: 3 May 1998 (age 28) Ceres, South Africa

Sport
- Country: South Africa
- Sport: Track and Field
- Events: 5000m, 10,000m
- University team: Florida State Seminoles
- Club: Hoka NAZ Elite
- Turned pro: 2022

Achievements and titles
- Personal bests: Outdoor; 1500 m: 3:51.95 (Raleigh 2021); 3000 m: 7:32.99 NR (Chorzów 2024); 5000 m: 13:02.46 (Heusden, Belgium 2023); 10,000 m: 26:50.64 NR (Paris 2024); Half Marathon: 59:13 NR (Valencia 2025); Indoor; 3000 m: 7:52.38 (Blacksburg 2022); 5000 m: 12:55.02 NR (Boston 2025)

Adriaan Wildschutt (born 3 May 1998) is a South African long-distance runner, who competes professionally for the Hoka NAZ Elite team.

He previously ran collegiately for Coastal Carolina University before transferring to Florida State for his final two years of college.

== Career ==
In March 2021, Wildschutt finished second at the 2020 NCAA Division I Cross Country Championships.

In February 2022, he ran an indoor 5000 metres in 13:09.30, setting a South African national record. He competed in the 5000 metres at the 2022 World Athletics Indoor Championships. He also competed in the 10,000 metres at the 2022 Commonwealth Games, and was placed 5th.

On January 26, 2024, beating Nico Young and Sam Atkin in a sprint finish, Wildschutt won the men's 5000m White Heat at the Boston University John Thomas Terrier Classic, bettering his indoor 5000m personal best by almost 13 seconds, lowering it down under the 13 minute barrier to 12:56.76. In doing so, Wildschutt also hit the qualifying standard of 13:05.00 for the Paris 2024 Olympic Games.

Wildschutt ran the qualifying standard for the Paris 2024 Olympic Games at The TEN on March 16, 2024 and reset the South African 10,000 m record to 26:55.54. In the Olympics 10,000 m final on 2 August 2024, he again reset the record to 26:50.64, beating his earlier record by 5 seconds, finishing 10th.

== Championship results ==
Year	Meet	Venue	Event	Place	Time
2019	NCAA Outdoor Championships	Mike A. Myers Stadium	10,000m	19th	30:52.04
2019	Summer Universiade	Naples, Italy	10,000m	3rd	29:36.39
2021	NCAA Indoor Championships	Randal Tyson Track Center	5000m	4th	13:30.55
2021	NCAA Outdoor Championships	Hayward Field	10,000m	8th	27:48.89
2022	NCAA Indoor Championships	Birmingham CrossPlex	5000m	4th	13:21.23
2022	World Indoor Championships	Štark Arena	3000m	H3 10th	8:09.24
2022	NCAA Outdoor Championships	Hayward Field	10,000m	7th	28:18.28
2022	NCAA Outdoor Championships	Hayward Field	5000m	16th	13:37.60
2022	World Athletics Championships	Hayward Field	5000m	H1 18th	13:44.32
2022	Commonwealth Games	Alexander Stadium	10,000m	5th	27:41.04
2023	World Athletics Championships	National Athletics Centre	10,000m	14th	28:21.40
2024	Olympics	Paris France	10,000m	10th	26:50.64
