= 2006 African Championships in Athletics – Men's hammer throw =

The men's hammer throw event at the 2006 African Championships in Athletics was held at the Stade Germain Comarmond on August 12.

== Results ==
Rank	Name	Nationality	#1	#2	#3	#4	#5	#6	Result	Notes
1st place, gold medalist(s)	Chris Harmse	South Africa	73.95	77.55	73.32	74.17	x	75.80	77.55	CR
2nd place, silver medalist(s)	Saber Souid	Tunisia	68.29	x	72.66	x	69.76	x	72.66	
3rd place, bronze medalist(s)	Mohsen El Anany	Egypt	x	x	x	66.79	67.32	69.22	69.22	
4	Ahmed Abderraouf	Egypt	67.47	x	68.50	x	68.54	x	68.54	
5	Nicolas Li Yun Fong	Mauritius	x	56.98	x	x	x	x	56.98	
