= Athletics at the 2015 African Games – Men's hammer throw =

The men's hammer throw event at the 2015 African Games was held on 16 September.

== Results ==
Rank	Name	Nationality	#1	#2	#3	#4	#5	#6	Result	Notes
1st place, gold medalist(s)	Mostafa Al-Gamel	Egypt	69.46	74.92	–	x	–	–	74.92	
2nd place, silver medalist(s)	Chris Harmse	South Africa	x	71.35	73.49	70.46	x	72.02	73.49	
3rd place, bronze medalist(s)	Nicolas Li Yun Fong	Mauritius	57.92	57.27	x	59.36	x	x	59.36	SB
	Mohamed Magdi Hamza	Egypt	–	–	–	–	–	–	NM	
	Hassan Abd El Gwad	Egypt							DNS	
