= Athletics at the 2011 All-Africa Games – Men's hammer throw =

The men's hammer throw event at the 2011 All-Africa Games was held on 14 September.

== Results ==
| Rank | Athlete | Nationality | #1 | #2 | #3 | #4 | #5 | #6 | Result | Notes |
|---|---|---|---|---|---|---|---|---|---|---|
| 1st place, gold medalist(s) | Mostafa Al-Gamel | Egypt | 70.50 | 72.89 | 72.73 | 74.44 | 72.79 | 74.76 | 74.76 | |
| 2nd place, silver medalist(s) | Chris Harmse | South Africa | 74.63 | 73.25 | 74.28 | 68.97 | 74.66 | 71.90 | 74.66 | |
| 3rd place, bronze medalist(s) | Hassan Mohamed Mahmoud | Egypt | 6?.18 | 68.22 | 67.21 | 68.31 | 69.70 | x | 69.70 | |
