= Driss Barid =

Moroccan hammer thrower

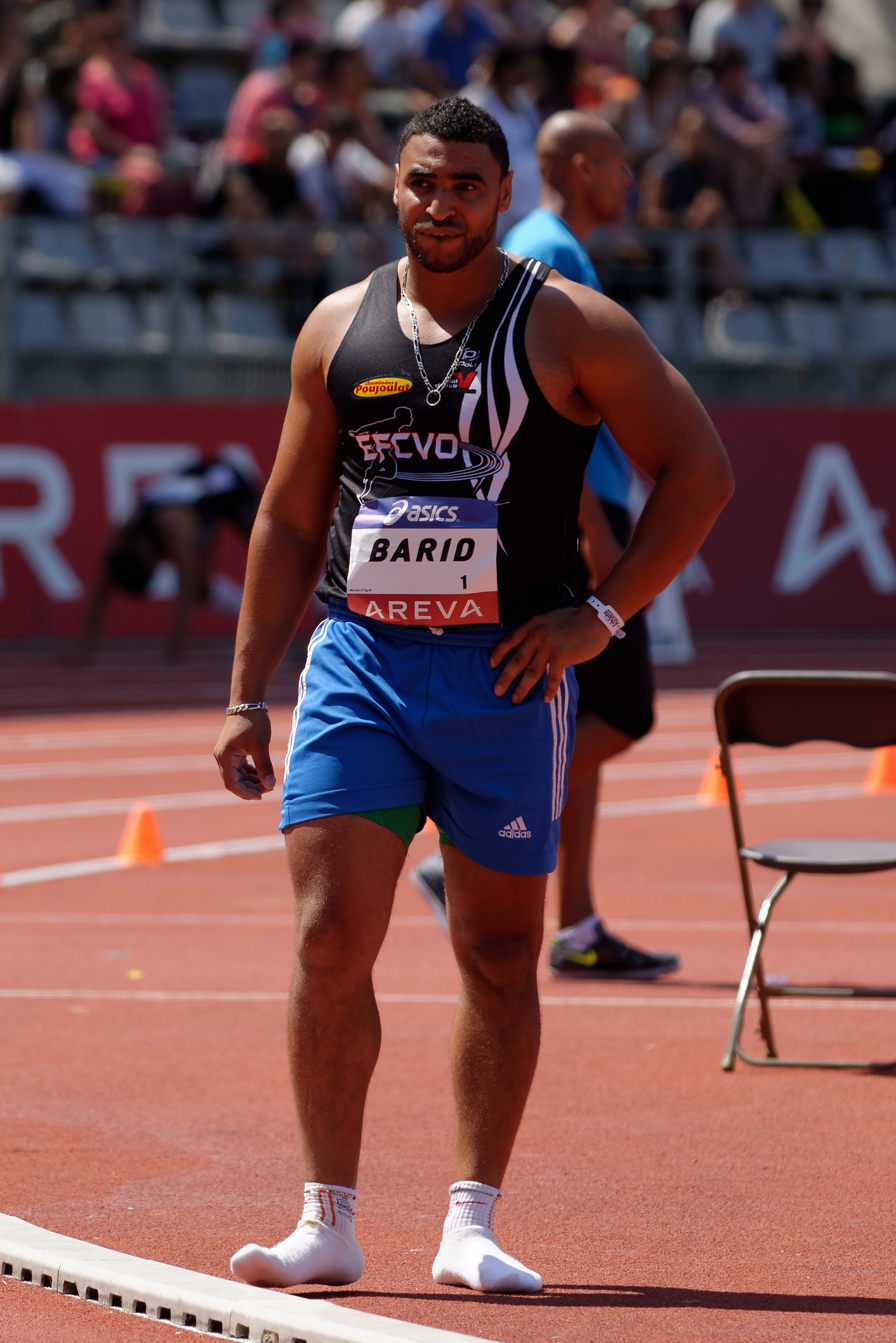
- Barid in 2013

Medal record

Men's athletics

Representing Morocco

African Championships
Bronze medal – third place	2014 Marrakesh	Hammer throw

Driss Barid (born 12 December 1986) is a Moroccan hammer thrower.

He finished seventh at the 2007 Pan Arab Games, fourth at the 2008 African Championships, sixth at the 2009 Jeux de la Francophonie, tenth at the 2009 Mediterranean Games, fifth at the 2010 African Championships, no-marked at the 2012 African Championships, finished sixth at the 2013 Jeux de la Francophonie and won the bronze medal at the 2014 African Championships.

His personal best throw was 70.73 metres, achieved in June 2013 in Rabat. This is the Moroccan record.
