= 2008 African Championships in Athletics – Men's hammer throw =

The men's hammer throw event at the 2008 African Championships in Athletics was held at the Addis Ababa Stadium on May 3.

== Results ==
Rank	Athlete	Nationality	#1	#2	#3	#4	#5	#6	Result	Notes
1st place, gold medalist(s)	Chris Harmse	South Africa	72.57	74.37	74.31	x	74.47	77.72	77.72	
2nd place, silver medalist(s)	Mostafa Al-Gamel	Egypt	66.44	69.69	69.70	68.00	67.91	69.66	69.70	
3rd place, bronze medalist(s)	Ahmed Abdul Raouf	Egypt	67.87	67.81	x	x	66.99	68.15	68.15	
4	Saber Souid	Tunisia	65.27	x	x	x	x	x	65.27	
5	Idriss Barid	Morocco	x	62.59	x	63.99	59.15	59.82	63.99	
6	Nicholas Li Yun Fong	Mauritius	57.94	59.74	59.07	59.40	61.42	61.18	61.42	
7	Dauda Omizi	Nigeria	x	48.62	54.50	x	x	x	54.50	
