= Francois Prinsloo =

South African athlete (born 2001)

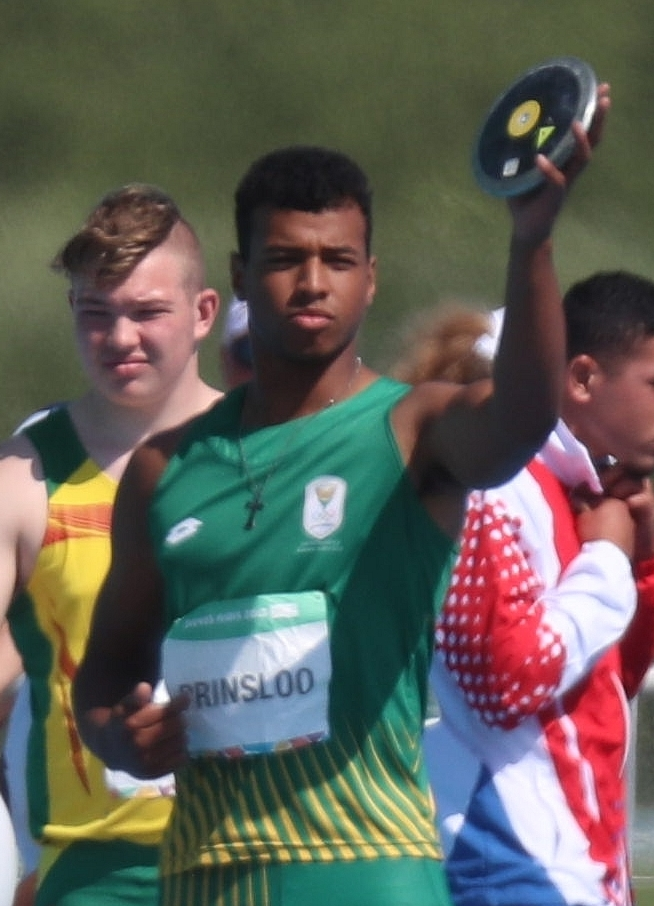
- 2018 Summer Youth Olympics

Personal information
- Nationality: South African
- Born: 11 November 2001 (age 24) Nairobi, Kenya

Sport
- Sport: Athletics
- Event: Discus

Achievements and titles
- Personal bests: Discus : 67.26m (Hattiesburg, 2024)
Medal record
Men's athletics
Representing South Africa
African U20 Championships
Silver medal – second place	2019 Abidjan	Discus
African Youth Games
Gold medal – first place	2018 Algiers	Discus

Francois Otieno Prinsloo (born 11 November 2001) is a South African discus thrower and professional wrestler.

== Early life ==
Born in Nairobi, Prinsloo would grow up in Worcester, South Africa. He attended Worcester Gymnasium for high school before leaving to the United States to attend the University of South Alabama. He won the Sun Belt discus championship for three consecutive years, and in 2024 also won the hammer throw. He was named the 2024 Sun Belt Conference Men’s Field Athlete of the Year.

== Career ==
He was an African Youth Games winner in 2018 in Algiers. He was an African U20 Championships silver medallist in the discus in 2019 in Abidjan.

He met the qualifying standard for the 2024 Paris Olympics whilst competing for the University of South Alabama in Hattiesburg, Mississippi with a discus throw of 67.26 metres.

In June 2024 he won the NCAA Division I title in the discus with a throw of 63.51 metres in Eugene, Oregon.

He competed in the discus throw at the 2024 Summer Olympics in Paris in August 2024. He signed with WWE in 2025. He was released in April 2026 amid large cuts to the WWE roster.
