= Athletics at the 2007 All-Africa Games – Men's hammer throw =

The men's hammer throw at the 2007 All-Africa Games was held on July 21, 2007.

== Results ==
Rank	Athlete	Nationality	Result	Notes
1st place, gold medalist(s)	Chris Harmse	South Africa	76.73	
2nd place, silver medalist(s)	Mohsen El Anany	Egypt	72.00	
3rd place, bronze medalist(s)	Saber Souid	Tunisia	70.01	
4	Samir Haouam	Algeria	63.96	
5	Omizi Dauda	Nigeria	56.65	
6	Nicolas Li Yun Fong	Mauritius	56.53	
7	Ibrahim Baba	Nigeria	55.37	
