= Saber Souid =

Tunisian hammer thrower (born 1981)

Medal record

Men's athletics

Representing Tunisia

African Championships
Silver medal – second place	2004 Brazzaville	Hammer throw
Silver medal – second place	2006 Bambous	Hammer throw
Bronze medal – third place	2002 Radès	Hammer throw

Saber Souid (born 9 March 1981) is a Tunisian former athlete specialising in the hammer throw. He won multiple medals at the continental level.

His personal best of 72.66 metres (2006) is the current national record.

== Competition record ==
Year	Competition	Venue	Position	Event	Notes
Representing Tunisia
1999	African Junior Championships	Tunis, Tunisia	2nd	Hammer throw	58.07 m
2001	Jeux de la Francophonie	Ottawa, Canada	8th	Hammer throw	62.52 m
2001	Mediterranean Games	Radès, Tunisia	7th	Hammer throw	63.57 m
2002	African Championships	Radès, Tunisia	3rd	Hammer throw	68.40 m
2003	All-Africa Games	Abuja, Nigeria	2nd	Hammer throw	70.81 m
2004	African Championships	Brazzaville, Republic of the Congo	2nd	Hammer throw	70.71 m
2004	Pan Arab Games	Algiers, Algeria	3rd	Hammer throw	71.41 m
2005	Islamic Solidarity Games	Mecca, Saudi Arabia	3rd	Hammer throw	71.36 m
2005	Mediterranean Games	Almería, Spain	7th	Hammer throw	70.08 m
2006	African Championships	Bambous, Mauritius	2nd	Hammer throw	72.66 m
2007	All-Africa Games	Algiers, Algeria	3rd	Hammer throw	70.01 m
2007	Pan Arab Games	Cairo, Egypt	4th	Hammer throw	68.56 m
2008	African Championships	Addis Ababa, Ethiopia	4th	Hammer throw	65.27 m
