= Dominique Scott =

South African long-distance runner

Dominique Scott-
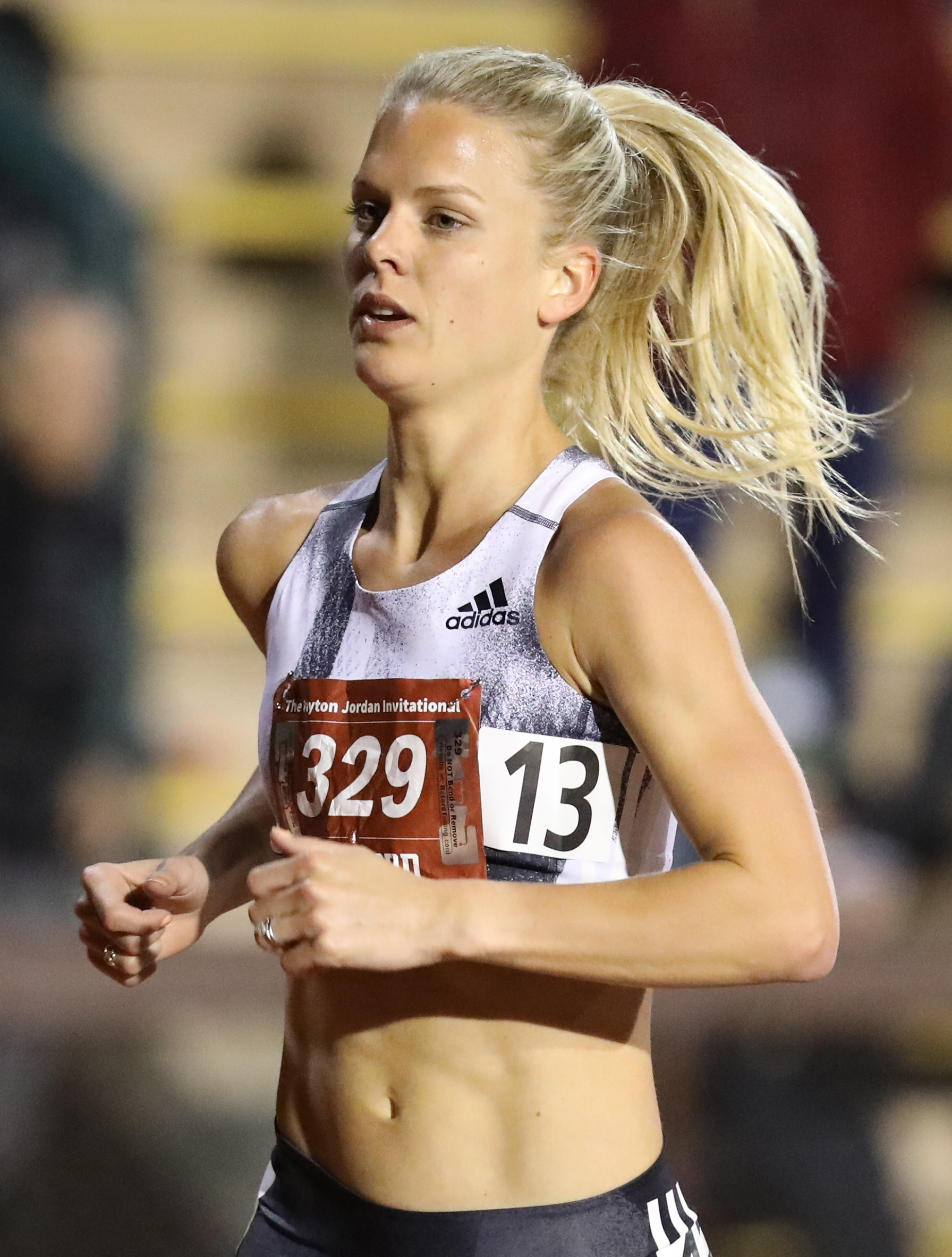
- Scott-Efurd in 2019

Personal information
- Nationality: South African
- Born: Dominique Scott; 24 June 1992 (age 34) Cape Town, South Africa
- Height: 1.65 m (5 ft 5 in)

Sport
- Sport: Track, long-distance running
- Event(s): 1500 meters, mile, 5000 meters, 10,000 meters
- College team: University of Arkansas Razorbacks
- Club: Adidas
- Turned pro: 2016

Achievements and titles
- Personal best(s): 1500 meters: 4:07.20 (2018) Mile: 4:26.63 (2018); 5000 meters: 14:59.08 (2019) 10,000 meters: 31:00.10 (2022)
Medal record
Representing South Africa
South African Championships
Silver medal – second place	2016 Senior Championships	1,500m
Gold medal – first place	2018 Senior Championships	5,000m
Silver medal – second place	2019 Senior Championships	5,000m
- Updated on 4 June 2016

Dominique Scott-Efurd (née Scott; born 24 June 1992) is a South African long-distance runner. She was a two-time national champion competing for the University of Arkansas in the United States. As a professional runner, Scott has competed for South Africa at the World Championships, Commonwealth Games, and at both the 2016 and 2020 Summer Olympics.

== Prep ==
Scott graduated from Rhenish Girls' High School in Stellenbosch in the Western Cape region of South Africa. Her personal-best times of 4:28 in the 1,500m, 9:40 in the 3,000m, and 34:28 in the 10K road race garnered the attention of Lance Harter of Arkansas.

== College ==
Scott graduated from the University of Arkansas in May 2015 with a degree in marketing.

Scott finished 6th at the 2014 NCAA cross country championships. She was a three-time SEC cross country, three-time indoor, and four-time outdoor champion. She ran the then-fifth fastest 3000 metres indoor track and field in NCAA history in 2015.

Year	Championship	Venue	Event	Time	Place
2012	Southeastern Conference Indoor	Kentucky – Nutter Field House – Lexington, KY	5000m	16:54.95	9th
2012	Southeastern Conference Outdoor	LSU – Bernie Moore Track Stadium – Baton Rouge, LA	10,000m	35:04.96	2nd
2012	Southeastern Conference Outdoor	LSU – Bernie Moore Track Stadium – Baton Rouge, LA	5000m	16:36.34	3rd
2013	Southeastern Conference Indoor	Arkansas-Randal Tyson Track Center – Fayetteville, AR	3000m	9:30.94	8th
2013	Southeastern Conference Indoor	Arkansas-Randal Tyson Track Center – Fayetteville, AR	5000m	16:35.02	5th
2013	Southeastern Conference Cross Country	Arkansas-Randal Tyson Track Center – Fayetteville, AR	6000m	20:02.8	1st
2013	NCAA Cross Country	LaVern Gibson Championship Cross Country Course; Indiana State – Terre Haute, IN	6000m	20:38.9	28th
2014	Southeastern Conference Indoor	Texas A&M-Gilliam Indoor Track Stadium – College Station, TX	5000m	16:00.73	1st
2014	Southeastern Conference Indoor	Texas A&M-Gilliam Indoor Track Stadium – College Station, TX	3000m	9:11.56	2nd
2014	NCAA Indoor	Albuquerque Convention Center – Albuquerque, NM	3000m	9:16.05	2nd
2014	NCAA Indoor	Albuquerque Convention Center – Albuquerque, NM	DMR	11:05.83	1st
2014	Southeastern Conference Outdoor	Kentucky – Lexington, KY	10,000m	33:51.84	1st
2014	Southeastern Conference Outdoor	Kentucky – Lexington, KY	5000m	15:53.74	2nd
2014	NCAA Outdoor	Hayward Field – Eugene, OR	5000m	15:57.79	6th
2014	Southeastern Conference Cross Country	Alabama – Tuscaloosa, AL	5872m	19:22.7	1st
2014	NCAA Cross Country	LaVern Gibson Championship Cross Country Course; Indiana State – Terre Haute, IN	6000m	20:01.3	6th
2015	Southeastern Conference Indoor	Kentucky – Nutter Field House – Lexington, KY	3000m	9:17.24	1st
2015	Southeastern Conference Indoor	Kentucky – Nutter Field House – Lexington, KY	Mile	4:32.49	1st
2015	Southeastern Conference Outdoor	Mississippi St. – Mississippi State, MS	5000m	16:06.52	1st
2015	Southeastern Conference Outdoor	Mississippi St. – Mississippi State, MS	1500m	4:15.20	1st
2015	NCAA Outdoor	Hayward Field – Eugene, OR	5000m	15:40.47	2nd
2015	NCAA Outdoor	Hayward Field – Eugene, OR	10,000m	33:25.81	2nd
2015	Southeastern Conference Cross Country	Texas A&M College Station, TX 77843	6000m	19:23.5	1st
2015	NCAA Cross Country	E. P. "Tom" Sawyer State Park Louisville, KY	6000m	19:40.8	3rd
2016	Southeastern Conference Outdoor	Sam Bailey Track Stadium Alabama – Tuscaloosa, AL	5000m	16:10.62	1st
2016	Southeastern Conference Outdoor	Sam Bailey Track Stadium Alabama – Tuscaloosa, AL	1500m	4:25.15	2nd
2016	NCAA Outdoor	Hayward Field – Eugene, OR	5000m	15:57.07	1st
2016	NCAA Outdoor	Hayward Field – Eugene, OR	10,000m	32:35.69	1st

Source: Source:

== Professional ==
Event	Distance	Time	Place
2024 Chicago Marathon	Marathon	2:28:16	15th
2024 Boston Marathon	Marathon	2:32:31	20th
2023 Chicago Marathon	Marathon	2:27:31	16th
2023 London Marathon	Marathon	2:29:19	12th
2022 Commonwealth Games	5000 m	15:07.50	5th
2022 Commonwealth Games	10,000 m	31:25.18	7th
2020 Summer Olympics	5000 m	15:13.94	13th
2020 Summer Olympics	10,000 m	32:14.05	20th
2019 World Athletics Championships	5000 m	15:24.47	15th
2019 IAAF World Cross Country Championships	10 km	DNF	--
2018 IAAF World Indoor Championships	3000 m	8:59.93	9th
2018 IAAF World Indoor Championships	1500 m	4:09.80	11th
2016 Summer Olympics	10,000 m	31:51.47	21st

== Personal life ==
Scott married Cameron Efurd in December 2015.
