= Athletics at the 2023 African Games – Men's hammer throw =

Men's hammer throw at the 2023 African Games
- Venue: Legon Sports Stadium
- Location: Accra, Ghana
- Dates: 21 March
- Competitors: 9 from 7 nations
- Winning distance: 73.65 m

Medalists
| gold medal | Mostafa El Gamel | Egypt |
| silver medal | Mohsen Mohamed Anani | Tunisia |
| bronze medal | Allan Cumming | South Africa |

The men's hammer throw event at the 2023 African Games was held on 21 March 2024 in Accra, Ghana.

== Results ==
Held on 21 March

| Rank | Name | Nationality | #1 | #2 | #3 | #4 | #5 | #6 | Result | Notes |
|---|---|---|---|---|---|---|---|---|---|---|
| 1st place, gold medalist(s) | Mostafa El Gamel | Egypt | 70.06 | 71.38 | 69.74 | 70.59 | 73.65 | 71.19 | 73.65 | |
| 2nd place, silver medalist(s) | Mohsen Mohamed Anani | Tunisia | 67.21 | x | 63.93 | 67.71 | 65.62 | x | 67.71 | |
| 3rd place, bronze medalist(s) | Allan Cumming | South Africa | 67.05 | x | x | 64.19 | x | 67.57 | 67.57 | |
| 4 | Ahmed Tarek Ismail | Egypt | x | 62.74 | x | x | x | 66.45 | 66.45 | |
| 5 | Dominic Ongidi Abunda | Kenya | 58.13 | 60.77 | 58.67 | x | x | 49.60 | 60.77 | |
| 6 | Jean Ian Carré | Mauritius | x | x | 53.02 | x | x | 53.04 | 53.04 | |
| 7 | Don Wittz | Seychelles | x | 44.66 | 46.75 | 46.00 | x | 44.05 | 46.75 | |
| 8 | Mersha Mintesnot | Ethiopia | 42.75 | 42.03 | 46.71 | x | 41.44 | 45.63 | 46.71 | |
| 9 | Kebede Chucho | Ethiopia | x | x | 42.29 | | | | 42.29 | |
