= Chris Harmse =

South African hammer thrower

Personal information
- Born: 31 May 1973 (age 53) Sasolburg, South Africa

Sport
- Sport: Track and field
Medal record
Representing South Africa
Commonwealth Games
Gold medal – first place	2010 New Delhi	Hammer throw
Bronze medal – third place	1998 Kuala Lumpur	Hammer throw
Bronze medal – third place	2006 Melbourne	Hammer throw
All-Africa Games
Gold medal – first place	1999 Johannesburg	Hammer throw
Gold medal – first place	2003 Abuja	Hammer throw
Gold medal – first place	2007 Algiers	Hammer throw
Silver medal – second place	2011 Maputo	Hammer throw
Silver medal – second place	2015 Brazzaville	Hammer throw
African Championships
Gold medal – first place	1998 Dakar	Hammer throw
Gold medal – first place	2002 Radès	Hammer throw
Gold medal – first place	2004 Brazzaville	Hammer throw
Gold medal – first place	2006 Bambous	Hammer throw
Gold medal – first place	2008 Addis Ababa	Hammer throw
Gold medal – first place	2012 Porto-Novo	Hammer throw
Silver medal – second place	2010 Nairobi	Hammer throw
Silver medal – second place	2014 Marrakesh	Hammer throw
Silver medal – second place	2016 Durban	Hammer throw

Christiaan Harmse (born 31 May 1973) is a South African hammer thrower. He has broken the African record seven times, and holds the championship record for both the African Championships and All-Africa Games.

He has been a dominant presence in African hammer throwing since his first African Championships in Athletics in 1998 where he took gold with a championship record throw. He then went on to claim four consecutive African titles between 2002 and 2008, improving his own record along the way. His performances at the All-Africa Games have been equally dominant – he won his first title at the 1999 Games with a Games record and won twice more consecutively in 2003 and 2007, improving his record both times.

Although he won bronze medals at the 1998 and 2006 Commonwealth Games, he has had considerably less success on the world stage – despite four appearances at the World Championships in Athletics in his career, he has never qualified for the final of the event. Furthermore, he has never represented South Africa at the Olympics as he does not compete on Sundays, due to his religious views. Harmse is only the second Olympian to withdraw from the games for religious reasons.

His personal best throw is 80.63 metres, achieved in April 2005 in Durban. This is the former African record, being beaten in 2014 by Mostafa Al-Gamel from Egypt.

On 22 April 2017, Harmse won his twenty-second consecutive national title at the South African Championships in Potchefstroom – a record unmatched by any athlete at the country's national championships. This has also been recorded as a World Record for most consecutive National Athletic Titles. He achieved this by besting Renaldo Frechou, whom himself gained the lead on his last throw with a distance of 70.30 meters. Tshepang Makhethe unfortunately threw a foul on his last. Chris stepped into the circle and threw a distance of 70.53 meters.

A 44-year-old Harmse extended his world record to 23 consecutive national titles with a throw of 70.62 m at the 2018 South African Championships, forcing Makhethe to settle for second place. His streak finally ended at the 2019 edition, where Harmse took the silver medal with 71.70 m as Makhethe had a personal best throw of 72.25 m to win gold.

== International competitions ==
Year	Competition	Venue	Position	Notes
Representing South Africa
1998	African Championships	Dakar, Senegal	1st	72.11 m (CR)
1998	Commonwealth Games	Kuala Lumpur, Malaysia	3rd	72.83 m
1998	World Cup	Johannesburg, South Africa	7th	68.34 m
1999	Universiade	Palma de Mallorca, Spain	13th	70.18 m
1999	World Championships	Seville, Spain	30th (q)	71.57 m
1999	All-Africa Games	Johannesburg, South Africa	1st	74.75 m (CR)
2001	Universiade	Beijing, China	5th	76.07 m
2002	African Championships	Radès, Tunisia	1st	76.07 m (CR)
2002	World Cup	Madrid, Spain	4th	77.16 m
2003	All-Africa Games	Abuja, Nigeria	1st	75.17 m (CR)
2003	Afro-Asian Games	Hyderabad, India	1st	75.67 m
2004	African Championships	Brazzaville, Republic of the Congo	1st	75.90 m
2005	World Championships	Helsinki, Finland	13th (q)	74.37 m
2006	Commonwealth Games	Melbourne, Australia	3rd	73.81 m
2006	African Championships	Bambous, Mauritius	1st	77.55 m (CR)
2006	World Cup	Athens, Greece	7th	73.94 m
2007	All-Africa Games	Algiers, Algeria	1st	76.73 m (CR)
2007	World Championships	Osaka, Japan	24th (q)	71.07 m
2008	African Championships	Addis Ababa, Ethiopia	1st	77.72 m (CR)
2009	World Championships	Berlin, Germany	—	NM
2010	Continental Cup	Split, Croatia	7th	71.06 m
2010	Commonwealth Games	New Delhi, India	1st	73.15 m
2010	African Championships	Nairobi, Kenya	2nd	72.56 m
2011	All-Africa Games	Maputo, Mozambique	2nd	74.66 m
2012	African Championships	Porto-Novo, Benin	1st	77.22 m
2013	World Championships	Moscow, Russia	24th (q)	71.42 m
2014	African Championships	Marrakesh, Morocco	2nd	73.90 m
2014	Continental Cup	Marrakesh, Morocco	7th	71.71 m
2015	African Games	Brazzaville, Republic of the Congo	2nd	73.49 m
2016	African Championships	Durban, South Africa	2nd	67.67 m
2018	African Championships	Asaba, Nigeria	5th	68.71 m
