= Athletics at the 2018 African Youth Games =

- Dates: 24 – 27 July
- Host city: Algiers, Algeria
- Venue: July 5, 1962 Stadium
- Level: Youth (under 18)
- Events: 36

The athletics competitions at the 2018 African Youth Games in Algiers, Algeria was held between 24 and 27 July at the July 5, 1962 Stadium. The competition served as the qualification for the 2018 Summer Youth Olympics which took place in October 2018 in Buenos Aires, Argentina.

The competition was dominated by South Africa which took 26 medals in total including 12 golds, followed by Nigeria and Ethiopia.

== Medal summary ==
=== Boys ===
Event	Gold		Silver		Bronze	
100 metres (wind: +2.5 m/s)	Luke Davids (RSA)	10.34	Alaba Akintola (NGR)	10.37	Muhamad Trawally (GAM)	10.57
200 metres (wind: +0.1 m/s)	Sulayman Touray (GAM)	20.97	Luke Davids (RSA)	21.04	Iruoghene Okoro (NGR)	21.16
400 metres	Kennedy Luchembe (ZAM)	46.21	Bernard Olesitse (BOT)	47.00	Solomon Diafo (GHA)	47.48
800 metres	Francis Leshoo Pesi (KEN)	1:50.72	Mohamed Abouettahery (MAR)	1:51.12	Tasew Yada (ETH)	1:51.52
1500 metres	Nickson Lesiyia Pariken (KEN)	3:49.64	Anass Essayi (MAR)	3:49.68	Melese Nberet (ETH)	3:49.70
3000 metres	Berihu Aregawi (ETH)	7:50.98	Oscar Chelimo (UGA)	8:00.72	Jackson Kavesa Muema (KEN)	8:03.96
110 metres hurdles (91.4 cm) (wind: +0.4 m/s)	Abderrazzak Mouzdahir (MAR)	13.77	Jeremie Lararaudeuse (MRI)	13.81	Mohamed Abderrahmane Zadi (ALG)	13.99
400 metres hurdles (84.0 cm)	Lindokuhle Gora (RSA)	52.18	Rami Balti (TUN)	53.51	Kealeboga Balemogi (BOT)	54.22
2000 m steeplechase	Abrham Sime (ETH)	5:35.86	Abel Yemane (ERI)	5:46.63	Denis Mutuku Matheka (KEN)	5:47.58
10,000 m track walk	Said Khoufache (ALG)	49:05.11	Osama Hassan (EGY)	49:21.86	Only two participants	
High jump	Bilel Afer (ALG)	2.06	Brian Ndlovu (ZIM)	2.02	Widzani Mojangi (BOT)	2.02
Pole vault	Nikolai van Huyssteen (RSA)	4.70	Fawzi Messaoudi (ALG)	3.40	Ludwig Huber (NAM)	3.30
Long jump	Jason Tito (RSA)	7.53w	Ineh Oritsemeyiwa (NGR)	7.35w	Luc Nadal (MRI)	7.14w
Triple jump	Ineh Oritsemeyiwa (NGR)	16.22	Sifiso Miya (RSA)	15.57	Bokamoso Mokgethi (BOT)	14.72
Shot put (5 kg)	Mohamed Salem (EGY)	18.39	Lohan Potgieter (RSA)	17.78	Salas Sebkhi (ALG)	15.05
Discus throw (1.5 kg)	Francois Prinsloo (RSA)	60.55	Mohamed Salem (EGY)	55.81	Jihed Sahli (TUN)	53.12
Hammer throw (5 kg)	Mohamed Tarek Ismail Mahmoud (EGY)	69.49	Damien Bothma (RSA)	65.77	Mortadha Bouzaien (TUN)	63.44
Javelin throw (700 g)	Jano Esterhuizen (RSA)	72.82	Ita Leshan (KEN)	67.18	Walid Mokni (TUN)	62.75

=== Girls ===
Event	Gold		Silver		Bronze	
100 metres (wind: +1.5 m/s)	Rosemary Chukwuma (NGR)	11.53	Rose Xeyi (RSA)	11.60	Oarabile Tshosa (BOT)	11.98
200 metres (wind: +0.3 m/s)	Rosemary Chukwuma (NGR)	23.45	Nicola van der Merwe (RSA)	24.20	Oarabile Tshosa (BOT)	24.58
400 metres	Favour Ofili (NGR)	53.57	Amy Naude (RSA)	54.57	Niddy Mingilishi (ZAM)	55.62
800 metres	Hirut Meshesha (ETH)	2:04.66	Angela Ndungwa Munguti (KEN)	2:06.21	Prudence Sekgodiso (RSA)	2:10.62
1500 metres	Lemlem Hailu (ETH)	4:36.71	Edinah Jebitok (KEN)	4:37.98	Nicole Louw (RSA)	4:40.68
3000 metres	Aberash Minsewo (ETH)	9:29.02	Sarah Chelangat (UGA)	9:30.60	Mercy Chepkorir Kerarei (KEN)	9:36.91
100 metres hurdles (76.2 cm) (wind: +2.3 m/s)	Kayla van der Bergh (RSA)	13.48	Rahil Hamel (ALG)	14.27	Vanice Kerubo Nyagisera (KEN)	16.61
400 metres hurdles	Gontse Morake (RSA)	1:00.39	Loubna Benhadja (ALG)	1:00.79	Sarah Ochigbo (NGR)	1:03.23
2000 m steeplechase	Fancy Cherono (KEN)	6:17.68	Mekdes Abebe (ETH)	6:26.86	Esther Yego Chekwemoi (UGA)	6:41.23
5000 m track walk	Marissa Swanepoel (RSA)	26:06.50	Sintayehu Masir (ETH)	26:09.03	Melissa Touloum (ALG)	26:35.29
High jump	Bianca Erasmus (RSA)	1.67	Laurentine Fouda Moumbagna (CMR)	1.60	Not awarded	
Pole vault	Imen Rhouma (TUN)	3.50	Yasmen Farag (EGY)	3.30	Nicole Janse van Rensburg (RSA)	3.20
Long jump	Victory George (NGR)	5.62w	Mieke Basson (RSA)	5.53	Ghada Hamdani (TUN)	5.44
Triple jump	Gontse Morake (RSA)	12.57	Ghada Hamdani (TUN)	12.33	Victory George (NGR)	12.31
Shot put (3 kg)	Dane Roets (RSA)	15.97	Hannah Kemele (NGR)	15.45	Zineb Zeroual (MAR)	14.57
Discus throw	Rana Ahmed (EGY)	44.99	Dane Roets (RSA)	43.42	Onome Ogbeni (NGR)	42.13
Hammer throw (3 kg)	Rawan Barakat (EGY)	69.16	Phethisang Makhethe (RSA)	59.95	Zineb Zeroual (MAR)	51.18
Javelin throw (500 g)	Martha Nthanze Musai (KEN)	54.12	Chane van Zyl (RSA)	51.13	Hannah Kemele (NGR)	46.94

== Medal table ==
* Host nation (Algeria)

Rank	Nation	Gold	Silver	Bronze	Total
1	South Africa (RSA)	12	11	3	26
2	Nigeria (NGR)	5	3	5	13
3	Ethiopia (ETH)	5	2	2	9
4	Kenya (KEN)	4	3	4	11
5	Egypt (EGY)	4	3	0	7
6	Algeria (ALG)*	2	3	3	8
7	Tunisia (TUN)	1	2	4	7
8	Morocco (MAR)	1	2	2	5
9	Zambia (ZAM)	1	0	1	2
10	Uganda (UGA)	0	2	1	3
11	Botswana (BOT)	0	1	5	6
12	Mauritius (MRI)	0	1	1	2
13	Cameroon (CMR)	0	1	0	1
13	Eritrea (ERI)	0	1	0	1
13	Zimbabwe (ZIM)	0	1	0	1
16	Ghana (GHA)	0	0	1	1
16	Namibia (NAM)	0	0	1	1
Totals (17 entries)		35	36	33	104
