= Mostafa El Gamel =

Egyptian hammer thrower (born 1988)

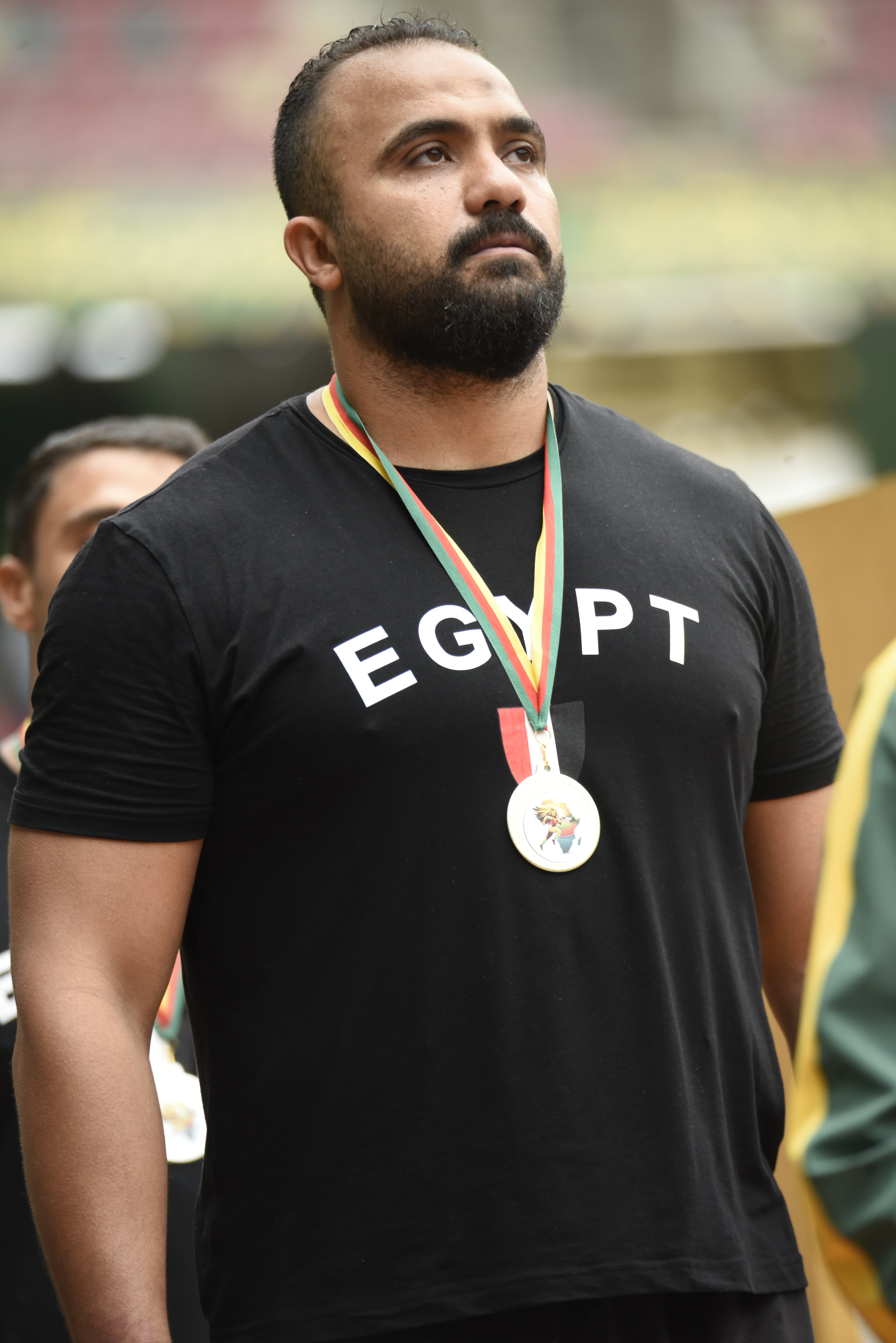

Personal information
- Born: 1 October 1988 (age 38) Giza, Egypt
- Height: 1.91 m (6 ft 3 in)
- Weight: 96 kg (212 lb)

Sport
- Country: Egypt
- Sport: Athletics
- Event: Hammer throw
Medal record
Men's athletics
Representing Egypt
African Games
Gold medal – first place	2011 Maputo	Hammer throw
Gold medal – first place	2015 Brazzaville	Hammer throw
Gold medal – first place	2019 Rabat	Hammer throw
Gold medal – first place	2023 Accra	Hammer throw
African Championships
Gold medal – first place	2014 Marrakesh	Hammer throw
Gold medal – first place	2018 Asaba	Hammer throw
Gold medal – first place	2024 Douala	Hammer throw
Gold medal – first place	2026 Accra	Hammer throw
Silver medal – second place	2008 Addis Ababa	Hammer throw
Bronze medal – third place	2010 Nairobi	Hammer throw
Bronze medal – third place	2012 Porto-Novo	Hammer throw
Mediterranean Games
Gold medal – first place	2013 Mersin	Hammer throw
- Updated on 26 August 2016

Mostafa Mohamed Hesham El Gamel (born 1 October 1988) is an Egyptian athlete. He competed for Egypt in the hammer throw event at the 2012 Summer Olympics.

== Career ==
He opened his 2014 season with a personal best throw of 81.27 m (266 ft 7 1/2 in) (by IAAF profile, 81.29 m by other sources)—‌a mark which broke the African record for the event.

== Competition record ==
Year	Competition	Venue	Position	Event	Notes
Representing Egypt
2007	African Junior Championships	Ouagadougou, Burkina Faso	1st	Hammer throw (6 kg)	66.36 m
2008	African Championships	Addis Ababa, Ethiopia	2nd	Hammer throw	69.70 m
2010	African Championships	Nairobi, Kenya	3rd	Hammer throw	71.40 m
2011	World Championships	Daegu, South Korea	30th (q)	Hammer throw	68.38 m
2011	All-Africa Games	Maputo, Mozambique	1st	Hammer throw	74.76 m
2011	Pan Arab Games	Doha, Qatar	2nd	Hammer throw	70.23 m
2012	African Championships	Porto-Novo, Benin	3rd	Hammer throw	73.81 m
2012	Olympic Games	London, United Kingdom	29th (q)	Hammer throw	71.36 m
2013	Mediterranean Games	Mersin, Turkey	1st	Hammer throw	76.68 m
2013	Islamic Solidarity Games	Palembang, Indonesia	1st	Hammer throw	77.73 m
2014	African Championships	Marrakesh, Morocco	1st	Hammer throw	79.09 m
2014	Continental Cup	Marrakesh, Morocco	2nd	Hammer throw	78.89 m
2015	World Championships	Beijing, China	7th	Hammer throw	76.81 m
2015	African Games	Brazzaville, Republic of the Congo	1st	Hammer throw	74.92 m
2018	African Championships	Asaba, Nigeria	1st	Hammer throw	73.50 m
2019	African Games	Rabat, Morocco	1st	Hammer throw	72.50 m
2019	World Championships	Doha, Qatar	30th (q)	Hammer throw	70.45 m
2021	Olympic Games	Tokyo, Japan	23rd (q)	Hammer throw	72.76 m
2022	African Championships	Port Louis, Mauritius	4th	Hammer throw	67.80 m
2022	Mediterranean Games	Oran, Algeria	7th	Hammer throw	70.48 m
2023	Arab Championships	Marrakesh, Morocco	1st	Hammer throw	75.70 m
2023	Arab Games	Oran, Algeria	1st	Hammer throw	76.48 m
2023	World Championships	Budapest, Hungary	28th (q)	Hammer throw	71.36 m
2024	African Games	Accra, Ghana	1st	Hammer throw	73.65 m
2024	African Championships	Douala, Cameroon	1st	Hammer throw	72.88 m
2024	Olympic Games	Paris, France	30th (q)	Hammer throw	70.09 m
2025	World Championships	Tokyo, Japan	30th (q)	Hammer throw	72.03 m
2026	African Championships	Accra, Ghana	1st	Hammer throw	72.58 m
2026	Mediterranean Games	Taranto, Italy	11th	Hammer throw	69.03 m
