= Tshepang Makhethe =

South African hammer thrower

Personal information
- Nationality: South African
- Born: 19 February 1996 (age 30) Sasolburg, South Africa
- Height: 1.89 m (6 ft 2 in)

Sport
- Sport: Track and field
- Event: Hammer throw

Achievements and titles
- Personal best: 72.25 m (2019)
Medal record
Men's athletics
Representing South Africa
African Championships
Silver medal – second place	2022 Mauritius	Hammer throw
Bronze medal – third place	2016 Durban	Hammer throw
Bronze medal – third place	2026 Accra	Hammer throw
African Junior Championships
Silver medal – second place	2015 Addis Ababa	Hammer throw

Tshepang Makhethe (born 19 February 1996) is a South African hammer thrower.

Makhethe finished tenth at the 2014 World Junior Championships. He won the silver medal at the 2015 African Junior Championships followed by the bronze medal at the 2016 African Championships. He finished eighth at the 2017 Universiade, ninth at the 2018 Commonwealth Games and fourth at the 2018 African Championships.

He won his first national title at the 2019 South African Championships, ending Chris Harmse's reign of 23 consecutive victories.

His personal best throw is 71.28 metres, achieved in March 2017 in Sasolburg.

== Achievements ==
=== National titles ===
- South African Championships
  - Hammer throw: 2019
- USSA Championships
  - Hammer throw: 2019
