= Drienkie van Wyk =

South African shot put athlete

Personal information
- Nationality: South African
- Born: Hendrina Elizabeth; 13 January 1971 (age 55)
- Occupation(s): Sports trainer, business owner of a nutrition shop
- Spouse: Morne Visagie

Sport
- Sport: Field athlete
- Club: Alberton

Achievements and titles
- Personal best: Shot put: 17.88m (South African record) 25 February 2002 - Germiston, South Africa National Champion Shot Put 2002

Hendrina Elizabeth "Drienkie" van Wyk (born 13 January 1971) is a South African woman athlete. Her discipline is shot put. Van Wyk is the current South African women shot put record holder.

== Upbringing ==
Van Wyk was born to Mike and Engela van Wyk. She grew up in Alberton, Gauteng, South Africa.

== Athletics ==
On 25 February 2002, she broke the South African Women Shot put record, with a distance of 17.88m. As of April 2018 (16 years) this records still stands. It was done in Germiston, South Africa. She was the National Champion in 2002 when she won the Shot Put at the National Championships held in Durban on 23 March 2002.

In 2002, she was World-ranked at No. 32.

== Body building ==
She participated in NABBA (National Amateur Body Building Association) Universe competition representing South Africa and came seventh in the class Miss physique-tall.

== Personal life ==
She married Morne Visagie in 2006. She is a sports trainer and owner of a nutrition shop.
