= Samir Haouam =

Algerian hammer thrower (born 1968)

Medal record

Men's athletics

Representing Algeria

African Championships
Gold medal – first place	2000 Algiers	Hammer throw
Silver medal – second place	1993 Durban	Hammer throw
Silver medal – second place	1996 Yaoundé	Hammer throw
Bronze medal – third place	1998 Dakar	Hammer throw

Samir Haouam (born 1 July 1968) is a retired Algerian athlete specialising in the hammer throw. He won multiple medals at the continental level, including the gold at the 2000 African Championships.

His personal best in the event is 71.28 metres from 2001 and Algerian record holder.

== Competition record ==
Year	Competition	Venue	Position	Notes
Representing Algeria
1993	African Championships	Durban, South Africa	2nd	63.76 m
1996	African Championships	Yaoundé, Cameroon	2nd	65.32 m
1998	African Championships	Dakar, Senegal	3rd	68.79 m
1999	All-Africa Games	Johannesburg, South Africa	2nd	65.80 m
2000	African Championships	Algiers, Algeria	1st	69.38 m
2001	Mediterranean Games	Radès, Tunisia	–	NM
2003	All-Africa Games	Abuja, Nigeria	3rd	68.95 m
2003	Afro-Asian Games	Hyderabad, India	3rd	69.37 m
2004	African Championships	Brazzaville, Republic of the Congo	4th	66.48 m
2007	All-Africa Games	Algiers, Algeria	4th	63.96 m
