= Dikotsi Lekopa =

South African athlete

Personal information
- Born: 7 July 1988 (age 37)

Sport
- Country: South Africa
- Sport: Track and field
- Event: 3000 metres steeplechase

Dikotsi Lekopa (born 7 July 1988) is a South African athlete specialising in the 3000 metres steeplechase. He competed at the 2015 World Championships in Beijing narrowly missing the final.

His personal best in the event is 8:32.17 set in Stellenbosch in 2015.

== Competition record ==
Year	Competition	Venue	Position	Event	Notes
Representing South Africa
2015	World Championships	Beijing, China	13th (h)	3000 m s'chase	8:37.43
