= Mohsen Mohamed Anani =

Egyptian hammer thrower (born 1985)

Medal record

Men's athletics

Representing Egypt

African Championships
Gold medal – first place	2010 Nairobi	Hammer throw
Silver medal – second place	2012 Porto-Novo	Hammer throw
Bronze medal – third place	2006 Bambous	Hammer throw

Mohsen Mohamed Abdel-Mohsen Anani Yousef Mustafa (Arabic: محسن محمد عبد المحسن عناني يوسف مصطفى; born 21 May 1985) is an Egyptian hammer thrower. He was born in Tunis, Tunisia. He transferred his eligibility to his native Tunisia in 2017.

He started as a shot putter, following that El Anany was recruited by former African shot put champion Nagui Asaad, who was setting up a throwing school that also included discus thrower Omar Ahmed El Ghazaly and shot putter Yasser Fathy Ibrahim Farag.

His personal best throw is 77.36 metres, achieved on March 29, 2010, in Al Qâhira. This is the current national record.

Anani was a 2006 All-American for the Virginia Tech Hokies track and field team, finishing 4th in the weight throw for distance at the 2006 NCAA Division I Indoor Track and Field Championships. He also finished 4th in the hammer throw at that year's outdoor championships.

== International competitions ==
Year	Competition	Venue	Position	Event	Notes
Representing Egypt
2001	African Junior Championships	Réduit, Mauritius	2nd	Hammer throw	57.11 m
2001	World Youth Championships	Debrecen, Hungary	19th (q)	Hammer throw (5 kg)	65.38 m
2002	World Junior Championships	Kingston, Jamaica	—	Hammer (6 kg)	NM
2003	African Junior Championships	Garoua, Cameroon	1st	Hammer throw (6 kg)	68.41 m
2003	All-Africa Games	Abuja, Nigeria	5th	Hammer throw	67.24 m
2004	World Junior Championships	Grosseto, Italy	2nd	Hammer throw (6 kg)	72.98 m
2005	Islamic Solidarity Games	Mecca, Saudi Arabia	4th	Hammer throw	69.50 m
2005	Mediterranean Games	Almería, Spain	8th	Hammer throw	69.83 m
2005	World Championships	Helsinki, Finland	21st (q)	Hammer throw	71.78 m
2006	African Championships	Bambous, Mauritius	3rd	Hammer throw	69.22 m
2007	All-Africa Games	Algiers, Algeria	2nd	Hammer throw	72.00 m
2007	Universiade	Bangkok, Thailand	4th	Hammer throw	72.66 m
2007	World Championships	Osaka, Japan	19th (q)	Hammer throw	72.93 m
2007	Pan Arab Games	Cairo, Egypt	1st	Hammer throw	74.22 m
2008	Olympic Games	Beijing, China	— (q)	Hammer throw	NM
2009	Universiade	Belgrade, Serbia	10th	Hammer throw	69.91 m
2009	World Championships	Berlin, Germany	20th (q)	Hammer throw	72.68 m
2009	Jeux de la Francophonie	Beirut, Lebanon	1st	Hammer throw	71.30 m
2010	African Championships	Nairobi, Kenya	1st	Hammer throw	74.72 m
2012	African Championships	Porto-Novo, Benin	2nd	Hammer throw	74.31 m
Representing Tunisia
2023	Arab Championships	Marrakesh, Morocco	3rd	Hammer throw	67.48 m
2023	Arab Games	Oran, Algeria	3rd	Hammer throw	67.69 m
2024	African Games	Accra, Ghana	2nd	Hammer throw	67.71 m
2024	African Championships	Douala, Cameroon	4th	Hammer throw	69.20 m
2025	Arab Championships	Oran, Algeria	4th	Hammer throw	67.98 m
