= Anel Oosthuizen =

South African athlete

Personal information
- Born: 22 April 1995 (age 31)
- Height: 167 cm (5 ft 6 in)
- Weight: 51 kg (112 lb)

Sport
- Country: South Africa
- Sport: Track and field
- Event: 20 kilometres race walk

Anel Visser (Oosthuizen) (born 22 April 1995) is a South African race walker. She is a 7 consecutive time South African Gold medalist at the South African National Championships. She holds multiple South African Race Walking Records including the 20 km Race Walking Record for women in a time of 1:34:49, which is also her personal best time to date. She competed in the women's 20 kilometres walk event at the 2016 Summer Olympics. She finished in a time of 1:45:06.
