= Athletics South Africa =

South African sports governing body

Athletics South Africa ASA
- IOC nation: RSA
- Sport: Athletics
- Official website: www.athleticssa.org.za

HISTORY
- Year of formation: 1894
- Former names: South African Amateur Athletic Union

AFFILIATIONS
- International federation: World Athletics (WA)
- WA member since: 1992
- Continental association: Confederation of African Athletics
- National Olympic Committee: South African Sports Confederation and Olympic Committee

ELECTED
- President: James Moloi

SECRETARIAT
- Address: No. 3, 11th Avenue, Houghton Estate, Johannesburg 2198, Gauteng
- Chief Executive: Richard Stander

Athletics South Africa is the national governing body for the sport of athletics (including track and field, cross country, road running and racewalking) in South Africa, recognised by the IAAF, and also a member of Confederation of African Athletics. The association is based in Johannesburg.

The organisation reports to the South African Sports Confederation and Olympic Committee (SASCOC). In 2011, SASCOC sacked the head of Athletics South Africa, Leonard Chuene, for financial mismanagement, misappropriation of funds, tax evasion, and conducting a sex verification tests on Caster Semenya without her consent. Thereafter, Athletics South Africa has been a key supporter in taking Semenya's case to the Court of Arbitration and the financial costs of this action prevented it from hosting the African Southern Region Athletics Championships in 2019.

== Affiliate members ==
This is a list of provincial affiliated members of ASA, according to the constitution of ASA.

- Athletics Central North West (ACNW)
- Athletics Free State (AFS)
- Athletics Gauteng North (AGN)
- Athletics Griqualand West (AGW)
- Athletics Mpumalanga (AMPU)
- Athletics North West North (ANWN)
- Athletics South Western Districts (ASWD)
- Athletics Transkei (ATRA)
- Athletics Vaal Triangle (AVT)
- Boland Athletics (BOLA)
- Border Athletics (BORA)
- Central Gauteng Athletics (CGA)
- Eastern Province Athletics (EPA)
- Kwa-zulu Natal Athletics (KZNA)
- Limpopo Athletics (LIMA)
- North Western Cape Athletics (NWCA)
- Western Province Athletics (WPA)

== Associate members ==
This is a list of associate members of ASA.

- University Sport South Africa – Athletics (USSA-Athletics)
- South African Masters Athletics (SAMA)
- South African Schools Athletics (SASA)
- South African National Defence Force – Athletics (SANDF Athletics)
- South African Police Services – Athletics (SAPS Athletics)
- Disability Sport South Africa (DISSA)

== See also ==
- List of South African records in athletics
