= South African Athletics Championships =

Annual sports competition

- Sport: Track and field
- Founded: 1894
- Country: South Africa

The South African Athletics Championships is an annual outdoor track and field competition organised by the Athletics South Africa, which serves as the national championship for the sport in South Africa.

Typically organised in March or April at the end of the South African summer, the event was first held in 1894 and introduced the first events for women in 1929. Separate annual championship events are held for cross country running, road running and racewalking events. The championships was first initiated by European colonists in the Cape Colony and continued with the formation of the Union of South Africa in 1910. The competition was organised and attended only by White South Africans (mostly of Dutch and British heritage). An open championship was established in 1974, including all races and international athletes. The International Amateur Athletic Association (IAAF) banned South Africa from international athletics in 1976 for its apartheid policy. As a result, the two competitions merged to form a single multi-racial national championship in 1977.

== Events ==
The competition programme features a total of 38 individual South African Championship athletics events, 19 for men and 19 for women. For each of the sexes, there are seven track running events, three obstacle events, four jumps, four throws, and one combined track and field event. There are also two relay team events which are contested between clubs, mostly of a provincial nature. Events were measured in imperial units until a change to the international metric standard in 1968.

Track running

- 100 metres, 200 metres, 400 metres, 800 metres, 1500 metres, 5000 metres, 10,000 metres

Obstacle events

- 100 metres hurdles (women only), 110 metres hurdles (men only), 400 metres hurdles, 3000 metres steeplechase

Jumping events

- Pole vault, high jump, long jump, triple jump

Throwing events

- Shot put, discus throw, javelin throw, hammer throw

Combined events

- Decathlon (men only), Heptathlon (women only)

Relay

- 4 × 100 metres relay, 4 × 400 metres relay

A men's 220-yard hurdles was held previously but dropped after 1966. Track racewalking was previously held at the competition, but was abolished after 1975 for men and held only for women in the period from 1991–1993.

The women's programme gradually expanded to match the men's. On the track, the 440-yard dash was first held in 1967, 1500 m was added in 1970, the 3000 metres in 1973 and the 10,000 metres in 1989. The 3000 m was replaced by a 5000 m in 1995. The 80 metres hurdles was contested until 1969, after which the international standard distance of 100 m hurdles was used. A 200 m hurdles event was introduced in 1972, then replaced by the longer 400 m event in 1975. Similarly, the women's pentathlon was replaced by the heptathlon in 1981. The women's field events reached parity with the men's after the addition of triple jump in 1991, hammer throw in 1994, and pole vault in 1995. The women's steeplechase was the last event to be added to the programme, appearing in 2000 metres steeplechase format in 1999 then being held over the standard 3000 m distance from the 2000 championships onwards.

== Editions ==
Ed.	Year	Location	Venue	Dates
	1996	Cape Town		19–20 April
	1997	Potchefstroom		7–8 March
	1998	Germiston		6–7 March
	1999	Durban		5–6 March
	2000	Cape Town		3–4 March
	2001	Durban		2–3 March
	2002	Durban		22–23 March
	2003	Port Elizabeth		25–26 April
	2004	Durban		16–17 April
	2005	Durban		15–16 April
	2006	Port Elizabeth		10–12 February
	2007	Durban		16–17 April
	2008	Stellenbosch	Coetzenburg Stadium	14–15 April
	2009	Stellenbosch	Coetzenburg Stadium	13–14 April
	2010	Durban		20–21 March
	2011	Durban		9–10 April
	2012	Port Elizabeth		13–14 April
	2013	Stellenbosch	Coetzenburg Stadium	12–13 April
	2014	Pretoria	Tuks Stadium	11–12 April
	2015	Stellenbosch	Coetzenburg Stadium	17–18 April
	2016	Stellenbosch	Coetzenburg Stadium	15–16 April
	2017	Potchefstroom		21–22 April
	2018	Pretoria	Tuks Stadium	16–17 April
	2019	Germiston	Germiston Stadium	25–26 April
