= South Africa at the 2025 World Athletics Championships =

- Flag of South Africa
- WA code: RSA

in Tokyo, Japan 13 September 2025 – 21 September 2025
- Competitors: 49 (32 men and 17 women)
- Medals Ranked 41st: Gold 0 Silver 0 Bronze 1 Total 1

World Athletics Championships appearances
- 1993; 1995; 1997; 1999; 2001; 2003; 2005; 2007; 2009; 2011; 2013; 2015; 2017; 2019; 2022; 2023; 2025

South Africa competed at the 2025 World Athletics Championships in Tokyo, Japan, from 13 to 21 September 2025.

== Medallists ==
Medal	Athlete	Event	Date
Bronze	Gardeo Isaacs*; Leendert Koekemoer*; Zakithi Nene; Udeme Okon; Lythe Pillay; Wayde van Niekerk	Men's 4 × 400 metres relay	September 21

== Results ==
South Africa entered 49 athletes to the championships: 31 men.

Key

- Q = Qualified for the next round
- q = Qualified for the next round as a fastest loser or, in field events, by position without achieving the qualifying target
- NR = National record
- PB = Personal best
- SB = Season best
- N/A = Round not applicable for the event

=== Men ===
Track and road events

Athlete	Event	Heat		Semifinal		Final	
Athlete	Event	Result	Rank	Result	Rank	Result	Rank
Gift Leotlela	100 metres	9.87 PB	1 Q	9.97	3 q	9.95	5
Retshidisitswe Mlenga	100 metres	10.42	7	Did not advance			
Akani Simbine	100 metres	10.02	1 Q	9.96	3 q	10.04	7
Sinesipho Dambile	200 metres	20.27	3 Q	19.97 PB	3 q	20.23	8
Naeem Jack	200 metres	20.65	5	Did not advance			
Wayde van Niekerk	200 metres	20.19	2 Q	20.12	4	Did not advance	
Zakithi Nene	400 metres	44.34	1 Q	44.20	1 Q	44.55	5
Lythe Pillay	400 metres	44.73 SB	2 Q	44.82	6	Did not advance	
Ryan Mphahlele	1500 metres	3:45.22	13	Did not advance			
Tshepo Tshite	1500 metres	3:36.36	6 Q	3:36.93	6 Q	3:35.50	9
Adriaan Wildschutt	10,000 metres	—N/a				28:59.47	10
Elroy Gelant	Marathon	—N/a				2:16:32	33
John Adesola	110 metres hurdles	13.57	6	Did not advance			
Antonio Alkana	110 metres hurdles	13.64	7	Did not advance			
Mondray Barnard	110 metres hurdles	13.57	6	Did not advance			
Sabelo Dhlamini	400 metres hurdles	49.50	5	Did not advance			
Sinesipho Dambile; Shaun Maswanganyi; Bradley Nkoana; Akani Simbine	4 × 100 metres relay	38.64	1	—N/a		Did not advance	
Gardeo Isaacs*; Leendert Koekemoer*; Zakithi Nene; Udeme Okon; Lythe Pillay; Wayde van Niekerk	4 × 400 metres relay	2:58.81	1 Q	—N/a		2:57.83	3rd place, bronze medalist(s)
Wayne Snyman	20 kilometres walk	—N/a				1:30:12 SB	43

Field events

Athlete	Event	Qualification		Final	
Athlete	Event	Distance	Position	Distance	Position
Brian Raats	High jump	NM		Did not advance	
Kyle Rademeyer	Pole vault	NM		Did not advance	
Cheswill Johnson	Long jump	7.55	32	Did not advance	
Aiden Smith	Shot put	19.32	26	Did not advance	
Chris van Niekerk	Shot put	18.81	30	Did not advance	
Victor Hogan	Discus throw	61.51	24	Did not advance	
Douw Smit	Javelin throw	81.23	18	Did not advance	

=== Women ===
Track and road events

Athlete	Event	Heat		Semifinal		Final	
Athlete	Event	Result	Rank	Result	Rank	Result	Rank
Miranda Charlene Coetzee	400 metres	57.78	8	Did not advance			
Shirley Nekhubui	400 metres	51.82	6	Did not advance			
Charné du Plessis	800 metres	Did not finish		Did not advance			
Prudence Sekgodiso	800 metres	Did not finish		Did not advance			
Marione Fourie	100 metres hurdles	12.86	2 Q	DQ		Did not advance	
Rogail Joseph	400 metres hurdles	56.20	7	Did not advance			
Zeney van der Walt	400 metres hurdles	55.32	4 Q	55.06	7	Did not advance	
Shirley Nekhubui; Zeney van der Walt; Hannah van Niekerk; Marlie Viljoen	4 × 400 metres relay	3:28.14	7	—N/a		Did not advance	
Jessica Groenewalt	35 kilometres walk	—N/a				3:16:03	34

Field events

Athlete	Event	Qualification		Final	
Athlete	Event	Distance	Position	Distance	Position
Miré Reinstorf	Pole vault	NM		Did not advance	
Danielle Nolte	Long jump	5.79	34	Did not advance	
Miné de Klerk	Shot put	17.39	24	Did not advance	
Ashley Erasmus	Shot put	16.90	30	Did not advance	
Colette Uys	Shot put	16.68	32	Did not advance	
Jo-Ané du Plessis	Javelin throw	61.38	10 q	63.06 SB	4

=== Mixed ===
Athlete	Event	Heat		Final	
Athlete	Event	Result	Rank	Result	Rank
Miranda Coetzee* (W); Gardeo Isaacs (M); Leendert Koekemoer (M); Shirley Nekhubui (W); Zeney van der Walt (W)	4 × 400 metres relay	3:11.16 AR	3 Q	3:11.89	6
