= South Africa at the 2015 World Championships in Athletics =

- WA code: RSA

in Beijing
- Competitors: 33
- Medals Ranked 13th: Gold 1 Silver 0 Bronze 2 Total 3

World Championships in Athletics appearances
- 1993; 1995; 1997; 1999; 2001; 2003; 2005; 2007; 2009; 2011; 2013; 2015; 2017; 2019; 2022; 2023; 2025

South Africa competed at the 2015 World Championships in Athletics in Beijing, China, from 22 to 30 August 2015.

== Medalists ==
The following South African competitors won medals at the Championships

| Medal | Athlete | Event | Date |
|---|---|---|---|
| Gold | Wayde van Niekerk | 400 metres | 26 August |
| Bronze | Anaso Jobodwana | 200 metres | 27 August |
| Bronze | Sunette Viljoen | Javelin throw | 30 August |

== Results ==
(q – qualified, NM – no mark, SB – season best)

=== Men ===
Track and road events

| Athlete | Event | Heat | | Semifinal | | Final | |
| Athlete | Event | Result | Rank | Result | Rank | Result | Rank |
|---|---|---|---|---|---|---|---|
| Henricho Bruintjies | 100 metres | 10.07 | 3 Q | 10.21 | 7 | Did not advance | |
| Anaso Jobodwana | 100 metres | DQ | | Did not advance | | | |
| Akani Simbine | 100 metres | 10.09 | 3 Q | 10.02 | 4 | Did not advance | |
| Anaso Jobodwana | 200 metres | 20.22 | 1 Q | 20.01 PB | 1 Q | 19.87 NR | 3rd place, bronze medalist(s) |
| Akani Simbine | 200 metres | 20.23 PB | 4 q | 20.37 | 6 | Did not advance | |
| Berend Koekemoer | 400 metres | 46.52 | 8 | Did not advance | | | |
| Wayde van Niekerk | 400 metres | 44.42 | 1 Q | 44.31 | 1 Q | 43.48 WL, AR | 1st place, gold medalist(s) |
| Reinhardt van Rensburg | 800 metres | 1:48.61 | 7 | Did not advance | | | |
| Johan Cronje | 1500 metres | 3:43.29 | 6 Q | 3:36.59 | 8 | Did not advance | |
| Dumisane Hlaselo | 1500 metres | 3:40.25 | 9 | Did not advance | | | |
| Stephen Mokoka | 10,000 metres | —N/a | | | | 28:47.40 | 20 |
| Thabiso Benedict Moeng | Marathon | —N/a | | | | DNF | |
| Desmond Mokgobu | Marathon | —N/a | | | | 2:34:11 | 41 |
| Sibusiso Nzima | Marathon | —N/a | | | | DNF | |
| Antonio Alkana | 110 metres hurdles | 13.63 | 6 | Did not advance | | | |
| Cornel Fredericks | 400 metres hurdles | DNS | | Did not advance | | | |
| L. J. van Zyl | 400 metres hurdles | 49.12 | 4 Q | 48.89 | 6 | Did not advance | |
| Dikotsi Lekopa | 3000 metres steeplechase | 8:37.43 | 6 | —N/a | | Did not advance | |
| Tumisang Monnatlala | 3000 metres steeplechase | 8:55.25 | 11 | —N/a | | Did not advance | |
| Henricho Bruintjies; Anaso Jobodwana; Antonio Alkana; Akani Simbine | 4 × 100 metres relay | DNF | | —N/a | | Did not advance | |
| Lebogang Shange | 20 kilometres walk | —N/a | | | | 1:21:43 NR | 11 |
| Marc Mundell | 50 kilometres walk | —N/a | | | | 4:02:41 | 33 |

Field events

| Athlete | Event | Qualification | | Final | |
| Athlete | Event | Result | Rank | Result | Rank |
|---|---|---|---|---|---|
| Rushwahl Samaai | Long jump | 7.79 | 20 | Did not advance | |
| Zarck Visser | Long jump | 7.79 | 19 | Did not advance | |
| Godfrey Khotso Mokoena | Long jump | 7.98 | 13 | Did not advance | |
| Godfrey Khotso Mokoena | Triple jump | 16.78 | 10 q | 16.81 | 9 |
| Orazio Cremona | Shot put | 18.63 | 27 | Did not advance | |
| Jaco Engelbrecht | Shot put | 19.04 | 25 | Did not advance | |
| Victor Hogan | Discus throw | 62.41 | 13 | Did not advance | |
| Rocco van Rooyen | Javelin throw | 75.55 | 28 | Did not advance | |

Combined events – Decathlon

| Athlete | Event | 100 m | LJ | SP | HJ | 400 m | 110H | DT | PV | JT | 1500 m | Final | Rank |
|---|---|---|---|---|---|---|---|---|---|---|---|---|---|
| Willem Coertzen | Result | 10.98 SB | 7.25 | 13.75 | 1.95 | DNS | − | − | − | − | − | DNF | − |
| Willem Coertzen | Points | 865 | 874 | 713 | 758 | 0 | − | − | − | − | − | DNF | − |

=== Women ===
Track and road events

| Athlete | Event | Heat | | Semifinal | | Final | |
| Athlete | Event | Result | Rank | Result | Rank | Result | Rank |
|---|---|---|---|---|---|---|---|
| Carina Horn | 100 metres | 11.08 | 3 Q | 11.15 | 6 | Did not advance | |
| Justine Palframan | 200 metres | 23.09 | 3 Q | 23.04 | 6 | Did not advance | |
| Justine Palframan | 400 metres | 52.45 | 6 | Did not advance | | | |
| Caster Semenya | 800 metres | 1:59.59 SB | 3 Q | 2:03.18 | 8 | Did not advance | |
| Tanith Maxwell | Marathon | —N/a | | | | DNF | |
| Wenda Nel | 400 metres hurdles | 54.45 | 2 Q | 54.63 | 2 Q | 54.94 | 7 |

Field events

| Athlete | Event | Qualification | | Final | |
| Athlete | Event | Distance | Position | Distance | Position |
|---|---|---|---|---|---|
| Sunette Viljoen | Javelin throw | 63.93 | 7 Q | 65.79 | 3rd place, bronze medalist(s) |
