= South Africa at the 2019 World Athletics Championships =

- WA code: RSA

in Doha, Qatar
- Competitors: 27 (22 men and 5 women) in 19 events
- Medals: Gold 0 Silver 0 Bronze 0 Total 0

World Athletics Championships appearances
- 1993; 1995; 1997; 1999; 2001; 2003; 2005; 2007; 2009; 2011; 2013; 2015; 2017; 2019; 2022; 2023

South Africa competed at the World Athletics Championships in Doha, Qatar from 27 September to 6 October 2019.

== Results ==
(q – qualified, NM – no mark, SB – season best)

=== Men ===
Track and road events

Athlete	Event	Heat		Semifinal		Final	
Athlete	Event	Result	Rank	Result	Rank	Result	Rank
Akani Simbine	100 m	10.01	2 Q	10.01	2 Q	9.93 SB	4
Simon Magakwe	100 m	10.25	28	did not advance			
Thando Dlodlo	100 m	10.25	29	did not advance			
Clarence Munyai	200 m	20.29	13 Q	20.55	17	did not advance	
Anaso Jobodwana	200 m	20.35 SB	14 Q	20.34 SB	14	did not advance	
Thapelo Phora	400 m	45.45	13 Q	45.24	16	did not advance	
Derrick Mokaleng	400 m	45.87	23	did not advance			
Tshepo Tshite	800 m	1:46.54	26 Q	1:46.08	15	did not advance	
Stephen Mokoka	Marathon	—				2:11:09	5
Desmond Mokgobu	Marathon	—				2:18:21	32
Thabiso Benedict Moeng	Marathon	—				did not finish	
Rantso Mokopane	3000 m steeplechase	8:42.22	41	—		did not advance	
Antonio Alkana	110 m hurdles	13.41	9 Q	13.47	17	did not advance	
Ruan de Vries	110 m hurdles	14.07	33	did not advance			
Lindsay Hanekom	400 m hurdles	51.71	35	did not advance			
Thando Dlodlo; Simon Magakwe; Clarence Munyai; Akani Simbine	4 × 100 m relay	37.65 AR	2 Q	—		37.73	5
Thapelo Phora; Gardeo Isaacs; Ranti Dikgale; Derrick Mokaleng	4 × 400 m relay	3:02.06 SB	10	—		did not advance	
Wayne Snyman	20 km walk	—				1:43:57	38
Marc Mundell	50 km walk	—				4:41:39	24

Field events

Athlete	Event	Qualification		Final	
Athlete	Event	Result	Rank	Result	Rank
Ruswahl Samaai	Long jump	8.01	5 q	8.23 SB	5
Luvo Manyonga	Long jump	7.91	10 q	8.28	4
Orazio Cremona	Shot put	19.98	24	did not advance	

=== Women ===
Track and road events

Athlete	Event	Heat		Semifinal		Final	
Athlete	Event	Result	Rank	Result	Rank	Result	Rank
Tebogo Mamathu	100 m	11.42	34	did not advance			
Dominique Scott-Efurd	5000 m	15:05.01	14 q	—		15:24.47	15
Rikenette Steenkamp	100 m hurdles	12.97 SB	17 q	12.96 SB	16	did not advance	
Zenéy van der Walt	400 m hurdles	57.11	31	did not advance			

Field events

Athlete	Event	Qualification		Final	
Athlete	Event	Result	Rank	Result	Rank
Sunette Viljoen	Javelin throw	60.10	17	did not advance	
