= 2024 African Championships in Athletics – Men's 20 kilometres walk =

Men's 20 kilometres walk at the 2024 African Championships in Athletics
- Venue: Japoma Stadium
- Location: Douala, Cameroon
- Dates: 25 June
- Competitors: 9 from 5 nations
- Winning time: 1:22:49

Medalists
gold medal	Misgana Wakuma	Ethiopia
silver medal	Heristone Wanyoni	Kenya
bronze medal	Wayne Snyman	South Africa

The men's 20 kilometres walk event at the 2024 African Championships in Athletics was held on 25 June in Douala, Cameroon.

== Records ==
Records before the 2024 African Athletics Championships
Record	Athlete (nation)	Time (s)	Location	Date
World record	Yusuke Suzuki (JPN)	1:16:36	Nomi, Japan	15 March 2015
African record	Samuel Gathimba (KEN)	1:18:23	Nairobi, Kenya	18 June 2021
Championship record	Samuel Gathimba (KEN)	1:19:24	Durban, South Africa	26 June 2016
World leading	Koki Ikeda (JPN)	1:16:51	Kobe, Japan	18 February 2024
African leading	Misgana Wakuma (ETH)	1:20:51	Antalya, Turkey	21 April 2024

== Results ==
Rank	Athlete	Nationality	Time	Notes
1st place, gold medalist(s)	Misgana Wakuma	Ethiopia	1:22:49	
2nd place, silver medalist(s)	Heristone Wanyoni	Kenya	1:23:26	
3rd place, bronze medalist(s)	Wayne Snyman	South Africa	1:25:19	
4	Ismail Benhammouda	Algeria	1:29:08	
5	Matebie Endasha	Ethiopia	1:35:08	
6	Malese Mulu	Ethiopia	1:36:03	
7	Aymen Ben Saha	Algeria	1:38:00	
8	Nzossie Herve	Cameroon	1:52:40	
9	Akamsembah Akamsembah	Cameroon	1:54:35	

== See also ==
- Athletics at the 2023 African Games – Men's 20 kilometres walk
