= South Africa at the 2013 World Championships in Athletics =

- WA code: RSA

in Moscow
- Competitors: 30
- Medals: Gold 0 Silver 0 Bronze 1 Total 1

World Championships in Athletics appearances
- 1993; 1995; 1997; 1999; 2001; 2003; 2005; 2007; 2009; 2011; 2013; 2015; 2017; 2019; 2022; 2023

South Africa competed at the 2013 World Championships in Athletics in Moscow, Russia, from 10–18 August 2013. A team of 30 athletes was announced to represent the country in the event.

== Results ==
(q – qualified, NM – no mark, SB – season best)

=== Men ===
Track and road events

Athlete	Event	Preliminaries		Heats		Semifinals		Final	
Athlete	Event	Time	Rank	Time	Rank	Time	Rank	Time	Rank
Anaso Jobodwana	100 metres			10.17	2	10.17	4		
Akani Simbine	100 metres			10.38	7				
Anaso Jobodwana	200 metres			20.17	1	20.13	2	20.14	6
Wayde van Niekerk	400 metres			46.37	5				
André Olivier	800 metres			DNS	–				
Johan Cronje	1500 metres			3:39.95	4	3:43.71	5	3:36.83	3
Elroy Gelant	5000 metres			13:25.07	6			13:43.58	12
Stephen Mokoka	10,000 metres							28:11.61	20
PC Beneke	400 metres hurdles			51.14	7				
Cornel Fredericks	400 metres hurdles			49.66	4	48.85	4		
L.J. van Zyl	400 metres hurdles			50.05	5				
Sibusiso Nzima	Marathon							2:26:32	43
Hendrick Ramaala	Marathon							2:30:23	47
Lebogang Shange	20 kilometres walk							DNF	–
Marc Mundell	50 kilometres walk							3:57:55	31

Field events

Athlete	Event	Preliminaries		Final	
Athlete	Event	Width Height	Rank	Width Height	Rank
Godfrey Khotso Mokoena	Long jump	8.16	2	8.10	7
Zarck Visser	Long jump	7.79	10		
Orazio Cremona	Shot put	19.42	7		
Victor Hogan	Discus throw	62.45	6	64.35	5
John Robert Oosthuizen	Javelin throw	74.36	16		
Chris Harmse	Hammer throw	71.42	13		

Decathlon

Willem Coertzen	Decathlon			
Willem Coertzen	Event	Results	Points	Rank
	100 m	10.95	872	2
	Long jump	7.44	920	3
	Shot put	13.88	721	6
	High jump	2.05	850	4
	400 m	48.32	894	1
	110 m hurdles	14.30	936	1
	Discus throw	43.25	731	4
	Pole vault	4.50	760	7
	Javelin throw	69.35	879	2
	1500 m	4:24.60	780	2
Total			8343	9

=== Women ===
Track and road events

Athlete	Event	Preliminaries		Heats		Semifinals		Final	
Athlete	Event	Time	Rank	Time	Rank	Time	Rank	Time	Rank
Justine Palframan	200 metres			23.64	5				
Anneri Ebersohn	400 metres hurdles			57.90	6				
Tanith Maxwell	Marathon							2:56:37	42

Field events

Athlete	Event	Preliminaries		Final	
Athlete	Event	Width Height	Rank	Width Height	Rank
Lynique Prinsloo	Long jump	6.17	15		
Sunette Viljoen	Javelin throw	64.51	2	63.58	6
