= Stephen Ndangiri =

Kenyan athlete (born 2005)

Personal information
- Full name: Stephen Ndangiri Kihu
- Born: 18 July 2007 (age 19)

Sport
- Sport: Athletics
- Event: Race walking
Medal record
Men's athletics
Representing Kenya
Commonwealth Games
Silver medal – second place	2026 Glasgow	10000 m walk
African Championships
Silver medal – second place	2026 Accra	20 km walk
African U20 Championships
Bronze medal – third place	2023 Ndola	10 km walk

Stephen Ndangiri Kihu (born 14 December 2005) is a Kenyan racewalking athlete. He was the Kenyan champion in 2026 and won silver medals at the 2026 African Championships and the 2026 Commonwealth Games.

== Biography ==
A member of the Kenyan Defence Forces, Ndangiri won the bronze medal at the 2023 African U20 Championships in Ndola, Zambia, competing in the 10,000 metres race walk.

Ndangiri won the silver medal at the 2026 African Championships in Accra in May 2026, competing in the 20,000 metres race walk in 1:20:01 to finish behind Ethiopia's Misgana Wakuma. In June, he won the 10.000 m walk at the Kenyan Championships in Nairobi ahead of national record holder Samuel Gathimba. He won the silver medal behind Australian Isaac Beacroft at the 2026 Commonwealth Games in the 10,000 metres race walk, setting a new personal best time of 38:46.57. Later that week, he was provisionally suspended by the Anti-Doping Agency of Kenya due to an adverse finding in an out-of-competition drug test on 30 June which indicated the presence of Prohibited substance S2. Peptide Hormones, Growth Factors, Related Substances and Mimetics/erythropoietin (EPO).
