= Athletics at the 2011 All-Africa Games – Men's 20 kilometres walk =

The men's 20 kilometres walk event at the 2011 All-Africa Games was held on 14 September.

== Results ==
Rank	Name	Nationality	Time	Notes
1st place, gold medalist(s)	Hassanine Sebei	Tunisia	1:24:53	
2nd place, silver medalist(s)	Hedi Teraoui	Tunisia	1:26:44	
3rd place, bronze medalist(s)	Gabriel Ngintedem	Cameroon	1:32:08	
4	Chernet Mikore	Ethiopia	1:33:38	
5	Julius Sawe	Kenya	1:34:36	
6	Misebo Minamo	Ethiopia	1:41:00	
7	Nilson Tavares	Cape Verde	1:57:45	
	Josphat Sirma	Kenya	DQ	
	Mulugeta Tesfaye	Ethiopia	DQ	
