= 2012 African Championships in Athletics – Men's 20 kilometres walk =

The men's 20 kilometre walk at the 2012 African Championships in Athletics was held at the Stade Charles de Gaulle on 29 June.

== Medalists ==
Gold	Hédi Teraoui; Tunisia
Silver	David Kimutai; Kenya
Bronze	Mohamed Ameur; Algeria

== Records ==
Standing records prior to the 2012 African Championships in Athletics
World record	Vladimir Kanaykin (RUS)	1:17:16	Saransk, Russia	29 September 2007
African record	Hatem Ghoula (TUN)	1:19:02	Eisenhüttenstadt, Germany	10 May 1997
Championship record	Hassanine Sebei (TUN)	1:20:36	Nairobi, Kenya	1 August 2010

== Schedule ==
Date	Time	Round
29 June 2012	10:35	Final

== Results ==
=== Final ===
Rank	Name	Nationality	Time	Note
1st place, gold medalist(s)	Hédi Teraoui	Tunisia		
2nd place, silver medalist(s)	David Kimutai	Kenya		
3rd place, bronze medalist(s)	Mohamed Ameur	Algeria		
4	Marc Mundell	South Africa		
5	Chernet Mikoro	Ethiopia		
6	Misebo Minamo	Ethiopia		
	Hichem Medjeber	Algeria	DNF	
	Aseffa Gizachew	Ethiopia	DNF	
	Gabriel Nghintedem	Cameroon	DNF	
	Mikael Songnaba	Burkina Faso	DNS	
