= 2015 Athletics Kenya World Championship Trials =

The 2015 Athletics Kenya World Championship Trials the athletics meeting held by Athletics Kenya to select the representatives to the 2015 World Championships in Athletics in Beijing, China The meet was held July 31 to August 1, 2015 in Nyayo National Stadium in Nairobi, Kenya. Nairobi is at high altitude in athletics terms.

== Men's Results ==
Key: ≠ Not yet selected in respective event because the athlete has not achieved the required qualifying standard. However, athletes can still pursue standards following this meet and still make the team provided they attain it before the August 10 cutoff date.

=== Track ===
| Event | Gold | | Silver | | Bronze | |
|---|---|---|---|---|---|---|
| 100 meters NWI, HAND TIMING | Mike Mokamba | 9.9≠ | Mark Otieno | 10.1≠ | Tony Chirchir | 10.2≠ |
| 200 meters NWI | Mike Mokamba | 20.48 | Carvin Nkanata | 20.82 | Mwai Peter | 20.90≠ |
| 400 meters | Alphas Kishoyian | 45.02 | Boniface Mweresa | 45.56 | Raymond Bett | 45.65≠ |
| 800 meters | Ferguson Rotich | 1:43.60 | David Rudisha | 1:43.89 | Alfred Kipketer | 1:44.07 |
| 1500 meters | Asbel Kiprop | 3:34.03 | Silas Kiplangat | 3:34.44 | Elijah Manangoi | 3:34.46 |
| 5000 meters | Edwin Soi | 13:30.83 | Emmanuel Kipsang | 13:33.84 | Isiah Kiplangat | 13:41.19 |
| 10,000 meters | Geofrey Kamworor | 27:11.89 | Bedan Karoki | 27:15.33≠ | Paul Kipngetich Tanui | 27:18.45 |
| 400 m hurdles | Nicholas Bett | 48.29 | Boniface Mucheru | 49.24 | Haron Koech | 49.50 |
| 3000 m s'chase | Jairus Birech | 8:19.55 | Conseslus Kipruto | 8:21.73 | Brimin Kipruto | 8:22.95 |
| 20 kilometers walk | Samuel Gathimba | 1:23:12 | Simon Wachira | 1:23:45 | David Kimutai | 1:24:41 |

=== Field ===
| Event | Gold | | Silver | | Bronze | |
|---|---|---|---|---|---|---|
| High jump | Mathieu Kiplagat Sawe | 2.25≠ | Amos Kipsaina | 2.05≠ | Nicanor Cheruiyot | 2.05≠ |
| Triple jump | Elijah Kimitei | 16.63≠ | Tera Lagat | 16.30≠ | Isaac Kirwa | 16.07≠ |
| Javelin throw | Julius Yego | 83.10 | Alex Kiprotich | 71.50≠ | Nelson Yegon | 70.34≠ |

== Women's results ==
Key: ≠ Not yet selected in respective event because the athlete has not achieved the required qualifying standard. However, athletes can still pursue standards following this meet and still make the team provided they attain it before the August 10 cutoff date.

=== Track ===
| Event | Gold | | Silver | | Bronze | |
|---|---|---|---|---|---|---|
| 100 meters NWI HAND TIMING | Eunice Kadogo | 11.2≠ | Millicent Ndoro | 11.4≠ | Fresha Mwangi | 11.5≠ |
| 200 meters NWI | Eunice Kadogo | 23.66≠ | Maurine Thomas | 23.82≠ | Hellen Syombua | 24.27≠ |
| 400 meters | Joyce Sakari | 51.16 | Maureen Jelagat | 51.77 | Jacinter Shikanda | 52.29≠ |
| 800 meters | Eunice Sum | 1:59.46 | Janeth Jepkosgei | 2:00.42 | Annet Mwanzi | 2:01.46≠ |
| 1500 meters | Faith Chepngetich | 4:01.85 | Mercy Cherono | 4:02.21 | Nancy Chepkwemoi | 4:04.67 |
| 5000 meters | Viola Kibiwott | 15:42.58 | Irene Cheptai | 15:42.98 | Janet Khisa | 15:44.77≠ |
| 10,000 meters | Vivian Cheruiyot | 32:58.4 | Betsy Saina | 32:59.2≠ | Joyce Chepkurui | 33:00.1≠ |
| 100 m hurdles NWI HAND TIMING | Priscila Tabunda | 14.0≠ | Florence Wasike | 14.7≠ | Veronicah Chebet | 15.0≠ |
| 3000 m s'chase | Hyvin Kiyeng | 9:33.42 | Virginia Nyambura | 9:33.69 | Rosefline Chepngetich | 9:35.75 |
| 20 kilometers walk | Grace Wanjiru | 1:39:53≠ | Grace Thoiti | 1:44:44≠ | Judith Cherop | 1:53:09≠ |
