= Athletics at the 2018 Commonwealth Games – Men's 20 kilometres walk =

Men's 20 kilometres walk at the 2018 Commonwealth Games
- Venue: Southport Broadwater Parklands
- Dates: 8 April 2018
- Competitors: 15 from 8 nations
- Winning time: 1:19:34 GR

Medalists
gold medal	Dane Bird-Smith	Australia
silver medal	Tom Bosworth	England
bronze medal	Samuel Gathimba	Kenya

The men's 20 kilometres walk at the 2018 Commonwealth Games, as part of the athletics programme, took place at Currumbin Beachfront on 8 April 2018.

Irfan Kolothum Thodi was later removed from the Games after a needle was found in his apartment, which was in contravention of Games policy.

== Records ==
Prior to this competition, the existing world and Games records were as follows:

World record	Yusuke Suzuki (JPN)	1:16:36	Nomi, Japan	15 March 2015
Games record	Nathan Deakes (AUS)	1:19:55	Melbourne, Australia	20 March 2006

== Schedule ==
The schedule was as follows:

Date	Time	Round
Sunday 8 April 2018	7:00	Race

All times are Australian Eastern Standard Time (UTC+10)

== Results ==
The results were as follows:

Rank	Order	Name	Result	Notes	Race violations
1st place, gold medalist(s)	10	Dane Bird-Smith (AUS)	1:19:34	GR	
2nd place, silver medalist(s)	8	Tom Bosworth (ENG)	1:19:38	NR^{[UK]}	~
3rd place, bronze medalist(s)	12	Samuel Gathimba (KEN)	1:19:51		~~
4	15	Benjamin Thorne (CAN)	1:20:49	SB	~
5	4	Quentin Rew (NZL)	1:21:47	SB	~
6	3	Manish Singh (IND)	1:22:22	R 125.5	~~
7	2	Callum Wilkinson (ENG)	1:22:35		~~
8	9	Evan Dunfee (CAN)	1:23:26	SB	>
9	1	Lebogang Shange (RSA)	1:23:27		
10	7	Michael Hosking (AUS)	1:25:35		~
11	13	Rhydian Cowley (AUS)	1:26:12		~~
12	5	Simon Wachira (KEN)	1:26:33		~
13	6	Irfan Kolothum Thodi (IND)	1:27:34		
14	11	Wayne Snyman (RSA)	1:28:09		
15	14	Jérôme Caprice (MRI)	1:33:12		

Notes

- ^{^{UK}} Also a British record
- > Bent knee
- ~ Loss of contact
