= 2022 African Championships in Athletics – Men's 20 kilometres walk =

The men's 20 kilometres walk event at the 2022 African Championships in Athletics was held on 12 June in Port Louis, Mauritius.

== Results ==
Rank	Athlete	Nationality	Time	Notes
1st place, gold medalist(s)	Samuel Gathimba	Kenya	1:22:01	
2nd place, silver medalist(s)	Wayne Snyman	South Africa	1:22:05	
3rd place, bronze medalist(s)	Yohanis Algaw	Ethiopia	1:22:21	
4	Misgana Wakuma	Ethiopia	1:22:48	
5	Mohamed Ragab	Egypt	1:26:07	
6	Islam Abdelkhalek	Egypt	1:29:02	
7	Birara Alem	Ethiopia	1:33:16	
8	Jérôme Caprice	Mauritius	1:36:39	
	Heristone Wanyonyi Wafula	Kenya	DNF	
