= Athletics at the 2015 African Games – Men's 20 kilometres walk =

The men's 20 kilometres walk event at the 2015 African Games was held on 15 September.

== Results ==
| Rank | Name | Nationality | Time | Notes |
|---|---|---|---|---|
| 1st place, gold medalist(s) | Lebogang Shange | South Africa | 1:26:43 | |
| 2nd place, silver medalist(s) | Samuel Ireri Gathimba | Kenya | 1:26:44 | |
| 3rd place, bronze medalist(s) | Wayne Snyman | South Africa | 1:27:32 | |
| 4 | David Kimutai | Kenya | 1:29:54 | |
| 5 | Simon Wachira | Kenya | 1:30:03 | |
| 6 | Bizuayehu Haile | Ethiopia | 1:35:05 | SB |
| 7 | Mthembi Chauque | South Africa | 1:35:44 | |
| 8 | Dagne Mekonen | Ethiopia | 1:35:55 | SB |
| 9 | Mboyo Harouna | DR Congo | 1:38:35 | NR |
| 10 | Romeo Ambomo | Republic of the Congo | 1:41:45 | NR |
| 11 | Vouidibio Koukaba | Republic of the Congo | 1:55:54 | |
| | Mohamed Ameur | Algeria | DNF | |
| | Cherinet Nikoro | Ethiopia | DNF | |
| | Hichem Medjeber | Algeria | DNS | |
