= South Africa at the 2017 World Championships in Athletics =

- WA code: RSA
- Website: www.athletics.org.za

in London
- Competitors: 29 in 19 events
- Medals Ranked 3th: Gold 3 Silver 1 Bronze 2 Total 6

World Championships in Athletics appearances
- 1993; 1995; 1997; 1999; 2001; 2003; 2005; 2007; 2009; 2011; 2013; 2015; 2017; 2019; 2022; 2023; 2025

South Africa competed at the 2017 World Championships in Athletics in London, United Kingdom, from 4 to 13 August 2017.

== Medalists ==
Medal	Name	Event	Date
Gold	Luvo Manyonga	Men's long jump	5 August
Gold	Wayde van Niekerk	Men's 400 metres	8 August
Gold	Caster Semenya	Women's 800 metres	13 August
Silver	Wayde van Niekerk	Men's 200 metres	10 August
Bronze	Ruswahl Samaai	Men's long jump	5 August
Bronze	Caster Semenya	Women's 1500 metres	7 August

== Results ==
=== Men ===
Track and road events

Athlete	Event	Heat		Semifinal		Final	
Athlete	Event	Result	Rank	Result	Rank	Result	Rank
Thando Roto	100 metres	DQ	–	Did not advance			
Akani Simbine	100 metres	10.15	15 q	10.05	5 Q	10.01	5
Clarence Munyai	200 metres	DQ	–	Did not advance			
Akani Simbine	200 metres	20.26	9 Q	20.62	18	Did not advance	
Wayde Van Niekerk	200 metres	20.16	4 Q	20.28	7 q	20.11	2nd place, silver medalist(s)
Pieter Conradie	400 metres	46.62	40	Did not advance			
Wayde Van Niekerk	400 metres	45.27	16 Q	44.22	3 Q	43.98	1st place, gold medalist(s)
Stephen Mokoka	10,000 metres	—N/a				28:14.67	20
Lusapho April	Marathon	—N/a				DNS	–
Desmond Mokgobu	Marathon	—N/a				2:16.14	21
Sibusiso Nzima	Marathon	—N/a				DNF	–
Antonio Alkana	110 metres hurdles	13.43	14 Q	13.59	16	Did not advance	
Lebogang Shange	20 kilometres walk	—N/a				1:19.18 NR	4

Field events

Athlete	Event	Qualification		Final	
Athlete	Event	Distance	Position	Distance	Position
Luvo Manyonga	Long jump	8.12	4 Q	8.48	1st place, gold medalist(s)
Ruswahl Samaai	Long jump	8.14	3 Q	8.32	3rd place, bronze medalist(s)
Zarck Visser	Long jump	7.66	25	Did not advance	
Orazio Cremona	Shot put	19.81	23	Did not advance	
Jaco Engelbrecht	Shot put	19.59	27	Did not advance	
Victor Hogan	Discus throw	62.26	18	Did not advance	
Rocco van Rooyen	Javelin throw	74.02	30	Did not advance	

=== Women ===
Track and road events

Athlete	Event	Heat		Semifinal		Final	
Athlete	Event	Result	Rank	Result	Rank	Result	Rank
Carina Horn	100 metres	11.28	19 Q	11.26	20	Did not advance	
Justine Palframan	200 metres	23.35	21 q	23.21	15	Did not advance	
Caster Semenya	800 metres	2:01.33	15 Q	1:58.90	1 Q	1:55.16 WL	1st place, gold medalist(s)
Gena Löfstrand	800 metres	2:01.73	20 q	2:03.67	23	Did not advance	
Caster Semenya	1500 metres	4:02.84 SB	2 Q	4:03.80	4 Q	4:02.90	3rd place, bronze medalist(s)
Jenna Challenor	Marathon	—N/a				2:47:22 SB	59
Mapaseka Makhanya	Marathon	—N/a				2:40:15 SB	40
Wenda Nel	400 metres hurdles	55.47	12 Q	55.70	10	Did not advance	
Justine Palframan; Gena Löfstrand; Ariane Nel; Wenda Nel	4 × 400 metres relay	3:37.82 SB	13	—N/a		Did not advance	
