= 2018 African Championships in Athletics – Men's 20 kilometres walk =

The men's 20 kilometres walk event at the 2018 African Championships in Athletics was held on 5 August in Asaba, Nigeria.

== Results ==
Rank	Athlete	Nationality	Time	Notes
1st place, gold medalist(s)	Samuel Gathimba	Kenya	1:25:14	
2nd place, silver medalist(s)	Lebogang Shange	South Africa	1:25:25	
3rd place, bronze medalist(s)	Hassanine Sebei	Tunisia	1:25:25	
4	Simon Wachira	Kenya	1:27:58	
5	Wayne Snyman	South Africa	1:28:16	
6	Mohamed Ameur	Algeria	1:28:38	
7	Tadilo Getu	Ethiopia	1:30:11	
8	Mohamed Ragab	Egypt	1:31:18	
9	Jérôme Caprice	Mauritius	1:33:28	
10	Biara Alem	Ethiopia	1:39:11	
11	Fatoyingo Gbenga	Nigeria	1:41:49	
12	Lawal Oluwaseyi	Nigeria	1:42:19	
13	Herve Nzossie	Cameroon	1:45:32	
14	Hichem Medjber	Algeria	1:50:04	
	Yohanis Algaw	Ethiopia	DNF	
	Mahmoud Awad	Egypt	DNF	
