= 2016 African Championships in Athletics – Men's 20 kilometres walk =

The men's 20 kilometres walk event at the 2016 African Championships in Athletics was held on 26 June in Durban.

== Results ==
Rank	Athlete	Nationality	Time	Notes
1st place, gold medalist(s)	Samuel Ireri Gathimba	Kenya	1:19:24	CR, NR
2nd place, silver medalist(s)	Hassanine Sebei	Tunisia	1:20:51	
3rd place, bronze medalist(s)	Lebogang Shange	South Africa	1:21:41	
4	Wayne Snyman	South Africa	1:22:20	
5	Simon Wachira	Kenya	1:23:26	
6	Hatem Ghoula	Tunisia	1:25:54	
7	Mohamed Ameur	Algeria	1:26:17	
8	Mohamed Saleh	Egypt	1:26:23	
9	Hichem Medjeber	Algeria	1:27:39	
10	Yohanis Algaw	Ethiopia	1:27:52	
11	Jérome Caprice	Mauritius	1:34:00	
12	Marc Mundell	South Africa	1:44:55	
	Birara Alem	Ethiopia	DQ	
	Yonas Ayele	Ethiopia	DNS	
