= 2006 African Championships in Athletics – Men's 20 kilometres walk =

The men's 20 kilometres walk event at the 2006 African Championships in Athletics was held in Bambous, Mauritius on August 13.

== Results ==
Rank	Name	Nationality	Time	Notes
1st place, gold medalist(s)	David Kimutai	Kenya	1:23:58
2nd place, silver medalist(s)	Hatem Ghoula	Tunisia	1:25:02
3rd place, bronze medalist(s)	Hichem Medjeber	Algeria	1:25:15
4	Hassanine Sebei	Tunisia	1:25:28
5	Moussa Aouanouk	Algeria	1:26:42
6	Mohamed Ameur	Algeria	1:29:34
7	Marc Mundell	South Africa	1:32:30
8	Degife Debeko	Ethiopia	1:32:42
9	Gabriel Ngnintedem Negoum	Cameroon	1:33:49
10	Piétron Randrianandrasana	Madagascar	1:34:33
11	Jérome Caprice	Mauritius	1:42:40
12	Ngambene Mukwa	Democratic Republic of the Congo	1:53:02
13	Bemba Toussaint	Republic of the Congo	1:54:38
14	Mathew Hogb	Namibia	2:11:38
	Woo Kai Song Arnaud	Mauritius	DNF
	Wayne Snyman	South Africa	DNF
	Tijani Sani Ahmed	Ghana	DNS
