= Athletics at the 2016 Summer Olympics – Men's 20 kilometres walk =

Men's 20 kilometres walk at the Games of the XXXI Olympiad
- Venue: Pontal
- Date: 12 August 2016
- Competitors: 74 from 40 nations
- Winning time: 1:19:14

Medalists
1st place, gold medalist(s)		Wang Zhen	China
2nd place, silver medalist(s)		Cai Zelin	China
3rd place, bronze medalist(s)		Dane Bird-Smith	Australia

Video on YouTube Official Video Highlights

The men's 20 kilometres race walk at the 2016 Summer Olympics in Rio de Janeiro took place on 12 August on a route along Pontal. Wang Zhen was the first male athletics medallist of the games. His Chinese teammate Cai Zelin was second and Dane Bird-Smith of Australia took the bronze.

== Summary ==
Miguel Ángel López of Spain, the reigning 2015 World Champion, was among the favourites though he was not high on the world lists that year. The defending 2012 Olympic champion Chen Ding had been defeated in national competition by Wang Zhen, who was fifth on the seasonal rankings and had won the 2016 IAAF World Race Walking Team Championships. Cai Zelin (fourth at the 2012 Olympics) rounded out the strong Chinese team. Japan entered a fast team, headed by the world's top three ranked walkers: Eiki Takahashi, Isamu Fujisawa and Daisuke Matsunaga. The ban of the perennially strong Russian team affected the quality of entrants.

In the race, Tom Bosworth of Great Britain was a leader for much of the race until Wang Zhen increased the pace and disrupted the lead pack. Neither the Olympic nor World Champion could follow and López ultimately fell to tenth overall. Wang's lead was never assailed and his compatriot Cai ended the race as silver medallist some 12 seconds behind. Australia's Dane Bird-Smith outwalked home athlete Caio Bonfim to take the bronze medal, though Bonfim was rewarded with fourth and a Brazilian record. While Bosworth faded to sixth, he still left with the British national record.

== Schedule ==
All times are Brasília Time (UTC−3).

Date	Time	Round
Friday, 12 August 2016	14:30	Final

== Records ==
Prior to this event, the existing World and Olympic records stood as follows.

World record	Yusuke Suzuki (JPN)	1:16:36	Nomi, Japan	15 March 2015
Olympic record	Chen Ding (CHN)	1:18.46	London, United Kingdom	4 August 2012

== Result ==
Rank	Athlete	Nation	Time	Notes
1st place, gold medalist(s)	Wang Zhen	China	1:19:14	
2nd place, silver medalist(s)	Cai Zelin	China	1:19:26	PB
3rd place, bronze medalist(s)	Dane Bird-Smith	Australia	1:19:37	PB
4	Caio Bonfim	Brazil	1:19:42	NR
5	Christopher Linke	Germany	1:20:00	
6	Tom Bosworth	Great Britain	1:20:13	NR
7	Daisuke Matsunaga	Japan	1:20:22	
8	Matteo Giupponi	Italy	1:20:27	PB
9	Manuel Esteban Soto	Colombia	1:20:36	PB
10	Evan Dunfee	Canada	1:20:49	
11	Miguel Ángel López	Spain	1:20:58	
12	Inaki Gomez	Canada	1:21:12	
13	Manish Singh	India	1:21:21	
14	Ever Palma	Mexico	1:21:24	
15	Éider Arévalo	Colombia	1:21:36	
16	Ruslan Dmytrenko	Ukraine	1:21:40	
17	Kim Hyun-sub	South Korea	1:21:44	SB
18	Hagen Pohle	Germany	1:21:44	
19	Jakub Jelonek	Poland	1:21:52	
20	Alexandros Papamichail	Greece	1:21:55	
21	Isamu Fujisawa	Japan	1:22:03	
22	Álvaro Martín	Spain	1:22:11	
23	Pedro Daniel Gómez	Mexico	1:22:22	
24	Richard Vargas	Venezuela	1:22:23	
25	Yerko Araya	Chile	1:22:23	
26	Marius Žiūkas	Lithuania	1:22:27	SB
27	Benjamin Thorne	Canada	1:22:28	
28	Máté Helebrandt	Hungary	1:22:31	PB
29	Luis Fernando López	Colombia	1:22:32	
30	Ersin Tacir	Turkey	1:22:53	
31	João Vieira	Portugal	1:23:03	
32	Anton Kučmín	Slovakia	1:23:17	
33	Rhydian Cowley	Australia	1:23:30	
34	Georgiy Sheiko	Kazakhstan	1:23:31	
35	Ihor Hlavan	Ukraine	1:23:32	
36	Hassanine Sebei	Tunisia	1:23:44	
37	Brian Pintado	Ecuador	1:23:44	
38	Nils Brembach	Germany	1:23:46	
39	Chen Ding	China	1:23:54	
40	Nazar Kovalenko	Ukraine	1:24:40	
41	Paolo Yurivilca	Peru	1:24:48	
42	Eiki Takahashi	Japan	1:24:59	
43	Aliaksandr Liakhovich	Belarus	1:25:04	
44	Lebogang Shange	South Africa	1:25:07	
45	Marco Antonio Rodríguez	Bolivia	1:25:11	SB
46	Alex Wright	Ireland	1:25:25	
47	Artur Brzozowski	Poland	1:25:29	
48	Erik Tysse	Norway	1:26:06	
49	Kévin Campion	France	1:26:22	
50	Érick Barrondo	Guatemala	1:27:01	
51	Juan Manuel Cano	Argentina	1:27:27	
52	Julio César Salazar	Mexico	1:27:38	
53	Sérgio Vieira	Portugal	1:27:39	
54	Hamid Reza Zouravand	Iran	1:27:45	
55	Francisco Arcilla	Spain	1:27:50	
56	José María Raymundo	Guatemala	1:29:07	
57	Choe Byeong-kwang	South Korea	1:29:08	
58	Wayne Snyman	South Africa	1:29:20	
59	Marius Šavelskis	Lithuania	1:29:26	
60	Nguyễn Thành Ngưng	Vietnam	1:30:01	
61	Byun Young-jun	South Korea	1:30:38	
62	Mert Atlı	Turkey	1:31:36	
63	Moacir Zimmermann	Brazil	1:33:58	
	Samuel Ireri Gathimba	Kenya	DNF	
	Simon Wachira	Kenya	DNF	
	Perseus Karlström	Sweden	DNF	
	Dzianis Simanovich	Belarus	DNF	
	José Alessandro Bagio	Brazil	DNF	
	Andrés Chocho	Ecuador	DQ	R230.7
	Mauricio Arteaga	Ecuador	DQ	R230.7
	Ganapathi Krishnan	India	DQ	R230.7
	Łukasz Nowak	Poland	DQ	R230.7
	Quentin Rew	New Zealand	DQ	R230.7
	Gurmeet Singh	India	DQ	R230.7
