= Athletics at the 2007 All-Africa Games – Men's 20 kilometres walk =

The men's 20 kilometres walk event at the 2007 All-Africa Games was held on July 21.

== Results ==
Rank	Name	Nationality	Time	Notes
1st place, gold medalist(s)	Hatem Ghoula	Tunisia	1:22:33	GR
2nd place, silver medalist(s)	David Kimutai	Kenya	1:24:16	
3rd place, bronze medalist(s)	Mohamed Ameur	Algeria	1:25:12	
4	Hicham Medjber	Algeria	1:33:02	
5	Chernet Mikore	Ethiopia	1:34:03	
6	Ali Amrouche	Algeria	1:37:09	
7	Tham Huatshwoyo	South Africa	1:37:39	
8	Marc Mundell	South Africa	1:38:26	
9	Ashenafi Merecho	Ethiopia	1:44:34	
10	Beja Kalamba	Democratic Republic of the Congo	1:44:59	
11	Werner Appel	South Africa	1:48:46	
12	Kazeem Adeyfini	Nigeria	1:55:04	
	Toussaint Bemba	Republic of the Congo	DNF	
	Gabriel Ngintedem	Cameroon	DNF	
	Hassanine Sbai	Tunisia	DQ	
