= List of Asian under-23 bests in athletics =

Asian U23 bests in the sport of athletics are the all-time best marks set in competition by aged 22 or younger throughout the entire calendar year of the performance and competing for a member nation of the Asian Athletics Association (AAA). Technically, in all under-23 age divisions, the age is calculated "on December 31 of the year of competition" to avoid age group switching during a competitive season. AAA does not maintain an official list for such performances. All bests shown on this list are tracked by statisticians not officially sanctioned by the governing body.

== Outdoor ==
=== Men ===
Event	Record	Athlete	Nationality	Date	Meet	Place	Age	Ref.
100 m	9.98 (+1.8 m/s)	Yoshihide Kiryu	Japan	9 September 2017	Intercollegiate Meet	Fukui, Japan	21 years, 268 days	
200 m								
400 m								
800 m								
1000 m								
1500 m								
3000 m								
5000 m								
10,000 m	26:38.76	Ahmad Hassan Abdullah	Qatar	5 September 2003	Memorial Van Damme	Brussels, Belgium	22 years, 38 days	
Half marathon	1:01:38	Kazura Munakata	Japan	17 November 2024	Ageo City Half Marathon	Ageo, Japan	19 years, 312 days	
Marathon								
110 m hurdles								
300 m hurdles	35.47	Yu Hashimoto	Japan	14 October 2024	National Sports Festival	Saga, Japan	18 years, 142 days	
400 m hurdles								
3000 m steeplechase	7:53.63	Saif Saaeed Shaheen	Qatar	3 September 2004	Memorial Van Damme	Brussels, Belgium	21 years, 324 days	
High jump								
Pole vault								
Long jump								
Triple jump								
Shot put	21.15 m	Abdelrahman Mahmoud	Bahrain	16 June 2021	Arab Championships	Radès, Tunisia	20 years, 166 days	
Discus throw								
Hammer throw								
Javelin throw								
Decathlon								
Decathlon	100m (wind) / Long jump (wind) / Shot put / High jump / 400m / 110m H (wind) / Discus / Pole vault / Javelin / 1500m							
5000 m walk (track)	18:43.70	Pu Huajia	China	8 August 2026	World U20 Championships	Eugene, United States	19 years, 69 days	
10,000 m walk (track)	37:25.90	Koki Ikeda	Japan	14 November 2020	Juntendo University Long Distance Meeting	Inzai, Japan	22 years, 195 days	
20 km walk (road)								
50 km walk (road)								
4 × 100 m relay								
4 × 400 m relay								

=== Women ===
Event	Record	Athlete	Nationality	Date	Meet	Place	Age	Ref.
100 m								
200 m								
400 m	49.08	Salwa Eid Naser	Bahrain	20 July 2018	Herculis	Fontvieille, Monaco	20 years, 58 days	
800 m								
1500 m	3:50.46	Qu Yunxia	China	11 September 1993	Chinese National Games	Beijing, China	20 years, 260 days	
3000 m	8:06.11	Wang Junxia	China	13 September 1993	Chinese National Games	Beijing, China	20 years, 247 days	
5000 m								
10,000 m	29:31.78	Wang Junxia	China	8 September 1993	Chinese National Games	Beijing, China	20 years, 242 days	
Marathon								
100 m hurdles								
300 m hurdles	40.20	Mariam Kareem	United Arab Emirates	18 July 2026	Night of Athletics	Heusden-Zolder, Belgium	18 years, 174 days	
400 m hurdles								
2000 m steeplechase	5:56.83	Winfred Mutile Yavi	Bahrain	1 September 2019	ISTAF Berlin	Berlin, Germany	19 years, 244 days	
3000 m steeplechase	8:52.78	Ruth Jebet	Bahrain	27 August 2016	Meeting Areva	Saint-Denis, France	19 years, 284 days	
High jump								
Pole vault								
Long jump								
Triple jump								
Shot put								
Discus throw								
Hammer throw	77.24 m	Zhang Jiale	China	2 August 2025	Chinese Championships	Quzhou, China	18 years, 284 days	
Javelin throw	71.74 m	Yan Ziyi	China	23 May 2026	Xiamen Diamond League	Xiamen, China	18 years, 1 day	
Heptathlon								
Heptathlon	100m H (wind) / High jump / Shot put / 200m (wind) / Long jump (wind) / Javelin / 800m							
5 km walk (road)	21:30	Wu Quanming	China	14 April 2018		Shangrao, China	16 years, 149 days	
10,000 m walk (track)								
20,000 m walk (track)	1:29:32.4	Hongjuan Song	China	23 October 2003	Changsha Chinese Urban Games	Changsha, China	19 years, 111 days	
20 km walk (road)								
35 km walk (road)	2:43:25	Wu Quanming	China	22 January 2022		Nanjing, China	20 years, 67 days	
4 × 100 m relay								
4 × 400 m relay								

== Indoor ==
=== Men ===
Event	Record	Athlete	Nationality	Date	Meet	Place	Age	Ref.
60 m	6.54	Abdul Hakim Sani Brown	Japan	8 March 2019	NCAA Division I Championships	Birmingham, United States	20 years, 2 days	
200 m								
400 m								
800 m								
1500 m								
Mile	3:57.43	Ryoji Tatezawa	Japan	25 February 2018	BU Last Chance Meet	Boston, United States	20 years, 285 days	
3000 m								
5000 m	13:09.45	Keita Sato	Japan	26 January 2024	BU John Thomas Terrier Classic	Boston, United States	20 years, 4 days	
60 m hurdles								
High jump								
Pole vault								
Long jump								
Triple jump								
Shot put								
Heptathlon								
Heptathlon	60m / Long jump / Shot put / High jump / 60m H / Pole vault / 1000m							
5000 m walk								
4 × 400 m relay								

=== Women ===
Event	Record	Athlete	Nationality	Date	Meet	Place	Age	Ref.
60 m								
200 m								
400 m								
800 m								
1500 m								
3000 m								
60 m hurdles								
High jump								
Pole vault								
Long jump								
Triple jump								
Shot put								
Pentathlon								
Pentathlon	60m H / High jump / Shot put / Long jump / 800m							
3000 m walk								
4 × 400 m relay								
