= 2026 African Championships in Athletics – Men's 20 kilometres walk =

Men's 20 kilometres walk at the 2026 African Championships in Athletics
- Location: Accra, Ghana
- Dates: 16 May
- Competitors: 13 from 7 nations
- Winning time: 1:18.47

Medalists
gold medal	Misgana Wakuma	Ethiopia
silver medal	Stephen Ndangiri	Kenya
bronze medal	Yasin Abduselam	Ethiopia

The men's 20 kilometres walk event at the 2026 African Championships in Athletics was held on 16 May in Accra, Ghana.

== Results ==
Rank	Athlete	Nationality	Time	Notes
1st place, gold medalist(s)	Misgana Wakuma	Ethiopia	1:18:47	CR, NR
2nd place, silver medalist(s)	Stephen Ndangiri	Kenya	1:20:01	
3rd place, bronze medalist(s)	Yasin Abduselam	Ethiopia	1:21:07	
4	Ismail Benhammouda	Algeria	1:21:09	NR
5	Heristone Wanyonyi Wafula	Kenya	1:22:51	
6	Islam Abdeltaeab Abdelkhalek	Egypt	1:23:13	
7	Samuel Gathimba	Kenya	1:24:51	
8	Sohail Abderahmane Alaoui	Algeria	1:29:03	
9	Rivers Williams	South Africa	1:36:14	
10	Arthur Seth	Ghana	1:36:50	
11	John Domici Dadzie	Ghana	1:49:46	
	Edem Ankur	Ghana	DNF	
	Indry Muteb Sand	Democratic Republic of the Congo	DQ	
	Armand Bazonngoula	Republic of the Congo	DNS	
