= 1992 Arab Junior Athletics Championships =

5th Arab Junior Athletics Championships
- Host city: Latakia, Syria
- Events: 40

The 1992 Arab Junior Athletics Championships was the fifth edition of the international athletics competition for under-20 athletes from Arab countries. It took place in Latakia, Syria – the third consecutive time that the event was staged in the country. Morocco and Egypt, two of the region's most prominent nations in the sport, did not send a team to the competition, which reduced the standard of the performances. A total of 40 athletics events were contested, 23 for men and 17 for women.

The women's 10,000 metres was dropped from the programme on this occasion. Track events were timed only to the tenth of a second, rather than the international standard hundredth of a second. Algeria topped the medal table with fifteen gold medals, mostly in the women's section. Qatar was runner-up with twelve gold medals and was dominant in the men's track events. The most prominent athletes to medal at the competition were men's race walk runner-up Hatem Ghoula, who went on to dominate the African race walk scene and win a World Championships medal, and double middle-distance medallist Ali Hakimi, who was an Olympic finalist in 1996.

== Medal summary ==
=== Men ===
Event	Gold		Silver		Bronze	
100 metres	Sultan Mohamed Al-Sheib (QAT)	10.5	Boubekeur Benayad (ALG)	10.6	Jassem Abbas (QAT)	10.7
200 metres	Masoud Khamis (QAT)	21.0 =CR	Sultan Mohamed Al-Sheib (QAT)	21.3	Abdellah Saber (ALG)	21.7
400 metres	Masoud Khamis (QAT)	47.08 CR	Salem Jamaan (KSA)	48.24	Latif Dbeiss (SYR)	48.72
800 metres	Farah Ibrahim (QAT)	1:52.1	Ali Hakimi (TUN)	1:52.2	Mohammed Abdullah (KSA)	1:53.0
1500 metres	Ali Hakimi (TUN)	3:54.0	Ahmed Krama (ALG)	3:54.4	Ahmed Boulihia (ALG)	3:56.4
5000 metres	Abdi Kabdid Farah (QAT)	14:28.1	Mokhtar Hizaoui (TUN)	14:30.3	Féthi Garyani (TUN)	14:52.0
10,000 metres	Abdi Kabdid Farah (QAT)	31:14.0 CR	Mokhtar Hizaoui (TUN)	31:24.0	Féthi Garyani (TUN)	32:55.9
110 m hurdles	Ali Ismail Doka (QAT)	14.4	Khalid Saloukha (SYR)	14.7	Fawaz Ismail (BHR)	14.8
400 m hurdles	Ali Ismail Doka (QAT)	51.48 CR	Hamed Al-Dosari (QAT)	52.62	Mohammed Hamed (KSA)	52.69
3000 metres steeplechase	Abderrahmane Daas (ALG)	9:07.2	Féthi Garyani (TUN)	9:26.9	Idd Horan (SYR)	9:43.3
4×100 m relay	Qatar (QAT)	41.5 CR	Algeria (ALG)	42.0	Syria (SYR)	42.3
4×400 m relay	Qatar (QAT)	3:13.6	Saudi Arabia (KSA)	3:14.5	Syria (SYR)	3:16.5
20 km road race	Majid Hussein (SYR)	1:11:36	Mohamed Al-Bishi (KSA)	1:20:29	Lowai Al-Haj (PLE)	1:24:39
10,000 m walk	Boubekeur Hihat (ALG)	48:16 CR	Hatem Ghoula (TUN)	49:47	Majid Turki (SYR)	52:46
High jump	Nassim Mahdi (ALG)	1.96 m	Ali Dahan (SYR)	1.93 m	Adel Ibrahim (BHR)	1.90 m
Pole vault	Hachem Benslim (ALG)	4.40 m =CR	Ahmed Abdulkarim (QAT)	4.00 m	Ibrahim Jassem (BHR)	3.90 m
Long jump	A. Belajal (ALG)	6.97 m	Abdullah Khamis (QAT)	6.90 m	Farid Hassa (ALG)	6.77 m
Triple jump	Farid Hassa (ALG)	14.00 m	Adnan Kaisa (SYR)	13.60 m	Hassan Zaid (BHR)	13.13 m
Shot put	Mustafa Katami (QAT)	13.86 m	Nasser Al-Majid (QAT)	12.90 m	Saoud Shoumari (KUW)	12.46 m
Discus throw	Mustafa Katami (QAT)	46.46 m CR	Nasser Abdul Al-Jarallah (KUW)	43.70 m	Fadel Abeidan (KSA)	43.46 m
Hammer throw	Nasser Abdul Al-Jarallah (KUW)	60.24 m	Mohamed Karim Horchani (TUN)	57.62 m	Rachid Maza (ALG)	53.18 m
Javelin throw	Ali Saleh Al-Jadani (KSA)	64.42 m	Jaber Al-Shehabi (QAT)	63.44 m	Fahim Mabrouk (TUN)	53.80 m
Decathlon	Abdul Marzouk Al-Shahrani (KSA)	6158 pts	Hadi Jadaan (KSA)	6046 pts	Ali Dahan (SYR)	5420 pts

=== Women ===
Event	Gold		Silver		Bronze	
100 metres	Saliha Hammadi (ALG)	12.4	Nawal Killi (ALG)	12.8	Soussi Nakachian (SYR)	12.9
200 metres	Nawal Killi (ALG)	25.5	Sonia Bououd (TUN)	25.9	Nawal Zayoud (SYR)	26.5
400 metres	Nawal Killi (ALG)	58.96	Latifa Zedini (TUN)	64.32	Nawal Zayoud (SYR)	65.43
800 metres	Al-Saïda Hamami (TUN)	2:14.3	Saliha Kacemi (ALG)	2:15.2	Latifa Zedini (TUN)	2:16.4
1500 metres	Saliha Kacemi (ALG)	4:55.4	Al-Saïda Hamami (TUN)	5:00.6	Mirvat Baas (SYR)	5:08.2
3000 metres	Dalila Tajine (ALG)	10:36.2	Fila Bouzeid (ALG)	10:36.2	Mirvat Baas (SYR)	11:29.6
100 m hurdles	Sana Drid (TUN)	14.7 CR	Lynda Chellakh (ALG)	15.6	Dorsaf Zrelli (TUN)	16.1
400 m hurdles	Dorsaf Zrelli (TUN)	66.0	Linda Madad (SYR)	76.2	Rouba Kabaoui (PLE)	82.3
4×100 m relay	Tunisia (TUN)	50.0	Algeria (ALG)	50.2	Syria (SYR)	50.7
4×400 m relay	Tunisia (TUN)	4:02.9	Syria (SYR)	4:15.4	Palestine (PLE)	4:35.1
5000 m walk	Nabila Yacia (ALG)	28:25.4	Thouraya Hamrouni (TUN)	28:51.3	Amina Lounon (ALG)	28:57.8
High jump	Lynda Chellakh (ALG)	1.59 m CR	Hala Saka (SYR)	1.56 m	Radia Mellal (ALG)	1.45 m
Long jump	Sana Drid (TUN)	5.41 m	Hala Saka (SYR)	5.33 m	Dorsaf Zrelli (TUN)	5.08 m
Shot put	Amel Ben Khaled (TUN)	11.82 m	Malika Hammou (ALG)	11.04 m	Lynda Chellakh (ALG)	9.26 m
Discus throw	Malika Hammou (ALG)	37.62 m	Fidila Khouri (SYR)	28.98 m	Amel Ben Khaled (TUN)	28.74 m
Javelin throw	Malika Hammou (ALG)	40.64 m CR	Fidila Khouri (SYR)	37.74 m	Lynda Chellakh (ALG)	32.88 m
Heptathlon	Dorsaf Zrelli (TUN)	3790 pts	Radia Mellal (ALG)	3100 pts	Amina Dbeib (PLE)	2363 pts

== Medal table ==
Rank	Nation	Gold	Silver	Bronze	Total
1	Algeria (ALG)	15	10	8	33
2	Qatar (QAT)	12	6	1	19
3	Tunisia (TUN)	9	10	7	26
4	Saudi Arabia (KSA)	2	4	3	9
5	Syria (SYR)	1	9	12	22
6	Kuwait (KUW)	1	1	1	3
7	Bahrain (BHR)	0	0	4	4
7	Palestine (PLE)	0	0	4	4
Totals (8 entries)		40	40	40	120
