= South Africa at the 2009 World Championships in Athletics =

- WA code: RSA

in Berlin
- Competitors: 24
- Medals: Gold 2 Silver 1 Bronze 0 Total 3

World Championships in Athletics appearances
- 1993; 1995; 1997; 1999; 2001; 2003; 2005; 2007; 2009; 2011; 2013; 2015; 2017; 2019; 2022; 2023; 2025

South Africa competed at the 2009 World Championships in Athletics from 15 to 23 August. A team of 24 athletes was announced in preparation for the competition. Selected athletes had achieved one of the competition's qualifying standards.

== Team selection ==
Track and road events

Event	Athletes	
Event	Men	Women
100 metres	Simon Magakwe	
200 metres	Thuso Mpuang; Tshegofatso Mputla	Isabel Le Roux
400 metres	Pieter Smith	
800 metres	Mbulaeni Mulaudzi; Samson Ngoepe	Caster Semenya
1500 metres	Johan Cronje; Peter van der Westhuizen	
Marathon	Norman Dlomo; Johannes Kekana; Coolboy Ngamole	Tanith Maxwell
3000 m steeplechase	Ruben Ramolefi	
100 metre hurdles	—	
110 metre hurdles	Lehann Fourie	—
400 metre hurdles	L. J. van Zyl	
4 x 100 metres relay	Unknown	
4 x 400 metres relay	Unknown	

Field and combined events

Event	Athletes	
Event	Men	Women
Long jump	Godfrey Khotso Mokoena	Janice Josephs
Discus throw		Elizna Naudé
Hammer throw	Chris Harmse	
Javelin throw	John Robert Oosthuizen	Sunette Viljoen
Decathlon	Willem Coertzen	—
