= South Africa at the 2007 World Championships in Athletics =

- WA code: RSA
- National federation: Athletics South Africa

in Osaka
- Medals: Gold 0 Silver 0 Bronze 0 Total 0

World Championships in Athletics appearances
- 1993; 1995; 1997; 1999; 2001; 2003; 2005; 2007; 2009; 2011; 2013; 2015; 2017; 2019; 2022; 2023; 2025

South Africa competed at the 2007 World Championships in Athletics, but did not win any medals.

== Competitors ==
=== Men ===
100 m: Sherwin Vries
200 m: Morne Nagel, Christiaan Krone
800 m: Mbulaeni Mulaudzi
Marathon: Hendrick Ramaala), Norman Dlomo, George Mofokeng, Bethuel Netshifhefhe, Zongamele Dyubeni
3,000 m Steeplechase: Ruben Ramolefi
110 m Hurdles: Shaun Bownes
400 m Hurdles: Alwyn Myburgh, Pieter de Villiers
4 × 100 m Relay: Sherwin Vries, Kagisho Kumbane, Leigh Julius, Snyman Prinsloo, Morne Nagel, Christiaan Krone
4 × 400 m Relay:

Long Jump: Khotso Mokoena
Javelin Throw: Robert Oosthuizen, Gerhardus Pienaar
Hammer Throw: Chris Harms

=== Women ===
100 m: Constance Mkenku
200 m: Geraldine Pillay
Marathon: Poppy Mlambo, Tanith Maxwell
3,000 m Steeplechase: Tebogo Masehla
Long Jump: Janice Josephs, Karin Mey
