= 2014 African Championships in Athletics – Men's 20 kilometres walk =

The men's 20 kilometres walk event at the 2014 African Championships in Athletics was held on August 14 in Marrakesh.

== Results ==
Rank	Name	Nationality	Time	Notes
1st place, gold medalist(s)	Lebogang Shange	South Africa	1:26:58	
2nd place, silver medalist(s)	Samuel Ireri Gathimba	Kenya	1:27:11	
3rd place, bronze medalist(s)	Mohamed Ameur	Algeria	1:27:48	
4	Hassanine Sebei	Tunisia	1:28:28	
5	David Kimutai	Kenya	1:29:16	
6	Hichem Medjeber	Algeria	1:33:36	
7	Mohamed Ragab	Egypt	1:34:26	
8	Ferhat Belaid	Algeria	1:35:22	
9	Chernet Mikoro	Ethiopia	1:36:25	
10	Ali Daghiri	Morocco	1:38:22	
11	Herve Nzossie	Cameroon	1:38:57	
12	Elegbede Bamidele	Nigeria	1:41:11	
13	Misebo Minamo	Ethiopia	1:42:25	
14	Getamesay Niguse	Ethiopia	1:44:03	
	Romeos Ambomo-Otsaka	Republic of the Congo	DNS	
