= Athletics at the 2026 Commonwealth Games – Men's 10,000 metres walk =

Men's 10,000 metres walk at the 2026 Commonwealth Games
- Venue: Scotstoun Stadium, Glasgow
- Dates: 31 July 2026
- Winning time: 38:45.51

Medalists
gold medal	Isaac Beacroft	Australia
silver medal	Stephen Ndangiri Kihu	Kenya
bronze medal	Evan Dunfee	Canada

The men's 10,000 metres walk at the 2026 Commonwealth Games, as part of the athletics programme, took place at the Scotstoun Stadium on 31 July 2026. The event was a straight final.

Reigning champion, Evan Dunfee returns to defend his title, having been selected by Team Canada on 24 June 2026.

== Records ==
Prior to this competition, the existing world and Games records were as follows:

Men's 10,000 metres race walk
World record	37:23.99	Gabriel Bordier (FRA)	2 August 2025	Talence, France
Commonwealth record	38:08.50	Evan Dunfee (CAN)	27 January 2025	Canberra, Australia
Games record	38:36.37	Evan Dunfee (CAN)	7 August 2022	Birmingham, England

== Schedule ==
The schedule is as follows:

Date	Time	Round
31 July 2026	18:30	Final

All times are United Kingdom time (UTC+1)

== Results ==
=== Final ===
The straight final of the 10,000 metres walk was scheduled for the evening of 31 July 2026.

Place	Athlete	Nation	Time	Notes
1st place, gold medalist(s)	Isaac Beacroft	Australia	38:45.51	SB
2nd place, silver medalist(s)	Stephen Ndangiri Kihu	Kenya	38:46.57	PB
3rd place, bronze medalist(s)	Evan Dunfee	Canada	40:03.39	
4	Declan Tingay	Australia	41:06.05	
—	Timothy Fraser	Australia	DQ	TR 54.7.5
