= 2004 African Championships in Athletics – Men's 20 kilometres walk =

The men's 20 kilometres walk event at the 2004 African Championships in Athletics was held in Brazzaville, Republic of the Congo on July 16.

== Results ==
| Rank | Name | Nationality | Time | Notes |
|---|---|---|---|---|
| 1st place, gold medalist(s) | Julius Sawe | Kenya | 1:27.43 | |
| 2nd place, silver medalist(s) | Hassanine Sebei | Tunisia | 1:28.35 | |
| 3rd place, bronze medalist(s) | Moussa Aouanouk | Algeria | 1:29.02 | |
| 4 | Daniel Foudjem Ngano | Cameroon | 1:33.34 | |
| 5 | Arezki Yahi | Algeria | 1:36.33 | |
| 6 | Ashenafi Merecho | Ethiopia | 1:39.25 | |
| 7 | Kalamba Beya | Democratic Republic of the Congo | 1:48.07 | |
| 8 | Gambne Mukwa | Democratic Republic of the Congo | 1:53.54 | |
| | Andreas Limingui | Republic of the Congo | DQ | |
| | Juvelane Ngueye | Republic of the Congo | DQ | |
