= 2010 African Championships in Athletics – Men's 20 kilometres walk =

The men's 20 kilometres walk at the 2010 African Championships in Athletics was held on August 1.

== Results ==
Rank	Name	Nationality	Time	Notes
1st place, gold medalist(s)	Hassanine Sebei	Tunisia	1:20:36	CR
2nd place, silver medalist(s)	David Kimutai	Kenya	1:21:07	SB
3rd place, bronze medalist(s)	Hichem Medjeber	Algeria	1:22:53	PB
4	Hedi Teraoui	Tunisia	1:23:25	PB
5	Mohamed Ameur	Algeria	1:24:53	
6	Sylvanus Wekesa	Kenya	1:25:32	SB
7	Gabriel Ngnintedem Negoum	Cameroon	1:27:44	SB
8	Chernet Mikoro	Ethiopia	1:30:08	SB
9	Eric Shikuku	Kenya	1:32:09	
10	Misebo Minamo	Ethiopia	1:36:23	
11	Degu Sore	Ethiopia	1:40:33	
12	Ngabene Mukwa	Democratic Republic of the Congo	1:54:58	
	Thami Hlatswayo	South Africa	DNF	
