= Moussa Aouanouk =

Algerian racewalker (born 1972)

Medal record

Men's athletics

Representing Algeria

African Championships
Silver medal – second place	1998 Dakar	20 km walk
Silver medal – second place	2000 Algiers	20 km walk
Silver medal – second place	2002 Radès	20 km walk
Bronze medal – third place	2004 Brazzaville	20 km walk

Moussa Aouanouk (born 2 August 1972) is a retired Algerian athlete specializing in race walking. He competed at two consecutive Summer Olympics starting in 2000.

== Competition record ==
Year	Competition	Venue	Position	Event	Notes
Representing Algeria
1990	World Junior Championships	Plovdiv, Bulgaria	19th	10,000 m walk	46:25.21
1998	African Championships	Dakar, Senegal	2nd	20 km walk	1:32:18
1999	All-Africa Games	Johannesburg, South Africa	2nd	20 km walk	1:29:36
2000	African Championships	Algiers, Algeria	2nd	20 km walk	1:25:42
2000	Olympic Games	Sydney, Australia	23rd	20 km walk	1:25:04
2001	Mediterranean Games	Radès, Tunisia	5th	10,000 m walk	1:31:20
2002	African Championships	Tunis, Tunisia	2nd	20 km walk	1:30:27
2003	All-Africa Games	Abuja, Nigeria	2nd	20 km walk	1:30:36
2003	Afro-Asian Games	Hyderabad, India	1st	10,000 m walk	43:33.58
2004	African Championships	Brazzaville, Republic of the Congo	3rd	20 km walk	1:29.02
2004	Olympic Games	Athens, Greece	31st	20 km walk	1:28:38
2004	Pan Arab Games	Algiers, Algeria	2nd	20,000 m walk	1:29:39.31
2005	Islamic Solidarity Games	Mecca, Saudi Arabia	2nd	20 km walk	1:32:41
2006	African Championships	Bambous, Mauritius	5th	20 km walk	1:26:42
