= South Africa at the 2023 World Athletics Championships =

- Flag of South Africa
- WA code: RSA

in Budapest, Hungary 19 August 2023 – 27 August 2023
- Competitors: 36 (24 men and 12 women)
- Medals: Gold 0 Silver 0 Bronze 0 Total 0

World Athletics Championships appearances
- 1993; 1995; 1997; 1999; 2001; 2003; 2005; 2007; 2009; 2011; 2013; 2015; 2017; 2019; 2022; 2023

South Africa competed at the 2023 World Athletics Championships in Budapest, Hungary, from 19 to 27 August 2023.

== Results ==
South Africa entered 36 athletes.

Key

- Q = Qualified for the next round
- q = Qualified for the next round as a fastest loser or, in field events, by position without achieving the qualifying target
- NR = National record
- PB = Personal best
- SB = Season best
- N/A = Round not applicable for the event

=== Men ===
Track and road events

Athlete	Event	Heat		Semifinal		Final	
Athlete	Event	Result	Rank	Result	Rank	Result	Rank
Shaun Maswanganyi	100 metres	10.21	4	Did not advance			
Benjamin Richardson	100 metres	10.17	4	Did not advance			
Akani Simbine	100 metres	9.97	1 Q	DQ		Did not advance	
Luxolo Adams	200 metres	20.15 SB	3 Q	20.44	6	Did not advance	
Sinesipho Dambile	200 metres	20.34	3 Q	20.28 PB	4	Did not advance	
Shaun Maswanganyi	200 metres	20.56	3 Q	20.65	7	Did not advance	
Zakithi Nene	400 metres	44.88	4 q	45.64	6	Did not advance	
Lythe Pillay	400 metres	45.58	4	Did not advance			
Wayde van Niekerk	400 metres	44.57	1 Q	44.65	3 q	45.11	7
Ryan Mphahlele	1500 metres	3:39.16	10	Did not advance			
Tshepo Tshite	1500 metres	3:46.79	2 Q	3:32.98	7	Did not advance	
Adriaan Wildschutt	10,000 metres	—				28:21.40	14
Melikhaya Frans	Marathon	—				DNF	
Tumelo Motlagale	Marathon	—				2:22:14	51
Simon Sibeko	Marathon	—				2:31:59	60
Antonio Alkana	110 metres hurdles	14.25	9	Did not advance			
Wayne Snyman	35 kilometres walk	—				2:35:13 SB	21
Shaun Maswanganyi; Benjamin Richardson; Clarence Munyai; Akani Simbine	4 × 100 metres relay	37.72 SB	2 Q	—		DNF	

Field events

Athlete	Event	Qualification		Final	
Athlete	Event	Distance	Position	Distance	Position
Kyle Rademeyer	Pole vault	5.70	15	Did not advance	
Cheswill Johnson	Long jump	7.61	26	Did not advance	
Kyle Blignaut	Shot put	18.82	34	Did not advance	
Burger Lambrechts jr.	Shot put	19.52	24	Did not advance	
Victor Hogan	Discus throw	61.80	27	Did not advance	
Douw Smit	Javelin throw	75.03	27	Did not advance	

=== Women ===
Track and road events

Athlete	Event	Heat		Semifinal		Final	
Athlete	Event	Result	Rank	Result	Rank	Result	Rank
Miranda Charlene Coetzee	400 metres	52.30	7	Did not advance			
Zenéy van der Walt	400 metres	51.76	3 Q	51.54	8	Did not advance	
Marlie Viljoen	400 metres	53.73	8	Did not advance			
Prudence Sekgodiso	800 metres	1:59.72	2 Q	2:11.68	8	Did not advance	
Carina Viljoen	1500 metres	4:11.02	12	Did not advance			
Irvette van Zyl	Marathon	—				2:38:32 SB	45
Taylon Bieldt	100 metres hurdles	13.05	7	Did not advance			
Marione Fourie	100 metres hurdles	12.71	3 Q	12.89	6	Did not advance	
Zenéy van der Walt	400 metres hurdles	55.21	5 q	55.49	8	Did not advance	

Field events

Athlete	Event	Qualification		Final	
Athlete	Event	Distance	Position	Distance	Position
Mirè Reinstorf	Pole vault	NM		Did not advance	
Ischke Senekal	Shot put	16.20	32	Did not advance	
Yolandi Stander	Discus throw	53.39	35	Did not advance	
Jo-Ane van Dyk	Javelin throw	60.09	10 q	57.43	10
