= Isaac Beacroft =

Australian athlete (born 2007)

Personal information
- Nationality: Australian
- Born: 18 July 2007 (age 19)

Sport
- Country: Australia
- Sport: Athletics
- Event: Race walking

Achievements and titles
- Personal bests: 5000 m: 19:23.96 (Sydney, 2024) AU20R; 10,000 m: 38:02.68 (Sydney, 2025) WU20R; Road; 10 km 39:56 (Antalya, 2024) AU20R
Medal record
Men's athletics
Representing Australia
Commonwealth Games
Gold medal – first place	2026 Glasgow	10000 m walk
World U20 Championships
Gold medal – first place	2026 Eugene	5000 m walk
World University Games
Silver medal – second place	2025 Bochum	20 km walk (team)
World Team Championships (U20)
Gold medal – first place	2024 Antalya	10 km walk
Silver medal – second place	2026 Brasilia	10 km walk
Bronze medal – third place	2024 Antalya	10 km (team)
Bronze medal – third place	2026 Brasilia	10 km (team)

Isaac Beacroft (born 18 July 2007) is an Australian race walker. He is the under-20 world record holder in the 10,000 metres race walk and World Under-20 champion in the 5,000 metres race walk. He won the gold medal in the 10,000 metres race walk at the 2026 Commonwealth Games.

Beacroft also won gold in the U20 men's 10 km race at the 2024 World Athletics Race Walking Team Championships, and silver in the individual, and bronze in the team event, at the same championships in 2026.

== Early life ==
Based in Blacktown, New South Wales, he is coached by his father David who was a junior race walker. He attended Oakhill College in Sydney. As well as pursuing athletics he was a member of Australian rules football club Greater Western Sydney Giants academy.

== Career ==
He set the fastest 5000 m time by an under-17 race walker in world history in December 2023 with a time of 19:31.21, just 1.07 seconds short of breaking the under-18 world record.

He won gold in the U20 men's 10 km race at the 2024 World Athletics Race Walking Team Championships in Antalya, Turkey, in April 2024, setting an Oceanian U20 record time of 39:56. He was still 16 years-old at the time and it was his first ever competition outside of Australia and only his second ever race on the road. He was also the youngest winner since Colombia's Eider Arevalo in 2010. He finished fourth on the track in the 10,000 m race walk at the 2024 World Athletics U20 Championships in Lima, Peru, in August 2024, setting an Oceanian U20 record of 39:36.39.

He was awarded a Sport Australia Hall of Fame awards scholarship in September 2024. He won the Australian U20 10,000 m title in April 2025. He was selected for the 2025 Summer World University Games in Bochum, and recorded a personal best of 1:22.37 to finish 10th in the 20 km road walk.

In December 2025, he set a new world under-20 record at the New South Wales 10,000m Race Walk Championships, winning in a time of 38:02.68. The time also broke the Australian Open record previously held by Declan Tingay. The following month, he won the Australian Athletics 10,000m Race Walking Championships. In April, he won the silver medal in the individual U20 race and bronze in the team event at the 2026 World Athletics Race Walking Team Championships in Brazil. On 31 July, he won the gold medal in the 10,000 metres race walk at the 2026 Commonwealth Games in Glasgow, Scotland ahead of Stephen Ndangiri of Kenya, with the race coming down to the final two hundred metres.
