= Mohamed Ameur =

Algerian race walker (born 1984)

Personal information
- Nationality: Algeria
- Born: 11 November 1984 (age 41)

Sport
- Sport: Athletics
- Event: Race Walk
Medal record
Men's athletics
Representing Algeria
African Games
Bronze medal – third place	2007 Algiers	20 km walk
African Championships
Gold medal – first place	2008 Addis Ababa	20 km walk
Bronze medal – third place	2012 Porto-Novo	20 km walk
Bronze medal – third place	2014 Marrakesh	20 km walk
- Updated on 27 August 2016

Mohamed Ameur (born 11 November 1984) is an Algerian race walker. Ameur competed in the 20 km Walk at the 2008 Olympic Games, he finished at a time of 1:32:21 and finished in 48th place.

== Competition record ==
Year	Competition	Venue	Position	Event	Notes
Representing Algeria
2001	World Youth Championships	Debrecen, Hungary	26th	10,000 m walk	48:40.35
2004	World Race Walking Cup	Naumburg, Germany	–	20 km walk	DQ
2006	African Championships	Bambous, Mauritius	6th	20 km walk	1:29:34
2007	All-Africa Games	Algiers, Algeria	3rd	20 km walk	1:25:12
2007	Pan Arab Games	Cairo, Egypt	3rd	20,000 m walk	1:43:35.8
2008	African Championships	Addis Ababa, Ethiopia	1st	20 km walk	1:22:55 (CR)
2008	Olympic Games	Beijing, China	48th	20 km walk	1:32:21
2009	Universiade	Belgrade, Serbia	15th	20 km walk	1:26:21
2010	African Championships	Nairobi, Kenya	5th	20 km walk	1:24:53
2012	African Championships	Porto-Novo, Benin	3rd	20 km walk	?
2014	African Championships	Marrakesh, Morocco	3rd	20 km walk	1:27:48
2015	African Games	Brazzaville, Republic of the Congo	–	20 km walk	DNF
2016	African Championships	Durban, South Africa	7th	20 km walk	1:26:17
2018	African Championships	Asaba, Nigeria	6th	20 km walk	1:28.38
2019	Arab Championships	Cairo, Egypt	2nd	20 km walk	1:25:37
2021	Arab Championships	Radès, Tunisia	4th	20 km walk	1:35:39
