= Athletics at the 2003 All-Africa Games – Men's 20 kilometres walk =

The men's 20 kilometres walk at the 2003 All-Africa Games were held on October 12.

== Results ==
Rank	Name	Nationality	Time	Notes
1st place, gold medalist(s)	Hatem Ghoula	Tunisia	1:30:32	
2nd place, silver medalist(s)	Moussa Aouanouk	Algeria	1:30:36	
3rd place, bronze medalist(s)	Rezki Yahi	Algeria	1:35:19	
4	Daniel Foudjem Ganno	Cameroon	1:36:06	
5	Kazeem Adeyemi	Nigeria	1:41:08	
6	Kaviraj Mardemootoo	Mauritius	1:42:01	
7	Oluwole Odunuga	Nigeria	1:42:47	
	Ahmed-Tijani Sanni	Ghana	DQ	
	Ayodele Gbenga	Nigeria	DQ	
	Samuel Sanze	Central African Republic	DNS	
