= 2008 African Championships in Athletics – Men's 20 kilometres walk =

The men's 20 kilometres walk event at the 2008 African Championships in Athletics was held on May 4.

== Results ==
Rank	Name	Nationality	Time	Notes
1st place, gold medalist(s)	Mohamed Ameur	Algeria	1:22:55	CR
2nd place, silver medalist(s)	Hichem Medjeber	Algeria	1:23:29	
3rd place, bronze medalist(s)	Hassanine Sebei	Tunisia	1:23:58	
4	David Kimutai	Kenya	1:25:08	
5	Chernet Mekuria	Ethiopia	1:28:57	
6	Degu Sori	Ethiopia	1:29:10	
7	Marc Mundell	South Africa	1:32:21	
8	Werner Appel	South Africa	1:33:57	
9	Degife Debeko	Ethiopia	1:34:15	
10	Thami Hlatswayo	South Africa	1:35:20	
11	Ngambene Mukwa	Democratic Republic of the Congo	1:50:14	
