= 2002 African Championships in Athletics – Men's 20 kilometres walk =

The men's 20 kilometres walk event at the 2002 African Championships in Athletics was held in Radès, Tunisia on August 6.

== Results ==
Rank	Name	Nationality	Time	Notes
1st place, gold medalist(s)	Hatem Ghoula	Tunisia	1:26:42	
2nd place, silver medalist(s)	Moussa Aouanouk	Algeria	1:30:27	
3rd place, bronze medalist(s)	Karim Boudhiba	Tunisia	1:35:05	
4	Rezki Yahi	Algeria	1:43:28	
5	Hamed Farag Abdel Jalil	Egypt	1:44:37	
6	Getachew Demise	Ethiopia	1:44:40	
	Vincent Asumang	Ghana	DNF	
	Kalamba Beya	Democratic Republic of the Congo	DNS	
