= Hédi Teraoui =

Tunisian race walker (born 1989)

Medal record

Men's athletics

Representing Tunisia

African Games
Silver medal – second place	2011 Maputo	20 km walk

African Championships
Gold medal – first place	2012 Porto-Novo	20 km walk

Hédi Teraoui (born 10 November 1989) is a Tunisian race walker who specialises in the 20 kilometres walk. He represented his country at the 2011 World Championships in Athletics and competed twice at the IAAF World Race Walking Cup. He was the champion at the 2012 African Championships in Athletics and runner-up at the 2011 All-Africa Games.

His best of 19:51.36 minutes for the 5000 metres race walk indoors is the African record for the distance. His personal best for the 20 km event is 1:23:25 hours.

He won his first international medal at the 2008 Arab Junior Athletics Championships, taking the 10,000 m walk gold medal. He competed at the 2008 World Junior Championships in Athletics that same year and came seventh.

Teraoui missed the 2015 season.

== International competitions ==
Year	Competition	Venue	Position	Event	Notes
2008	Arab Junior Championships	Radès, Tunisia	1st	10,000 m walk	42:49.22
2008	World Junior Championships	Bydgoszcz, Poland	7th	10,000 m walk	42:18.65
2009	Mediterranean Games	Pescara, Italy	11th	20 km walk	1:44:18
2010	World Race Walking Cup	Chihuahua City, Mexico	61st	20 km walk	1:37:38
2010	African Championships	Nairobi, Kenya	4th	20 km walk	1:23:25
2011	All-Africa Games	Maputo, Mozambique	2nd	20 km walk	1:26:44
2011	World Championships	Daegu, South Korea	33rd	20 km walk	1:29:48
2011	Pan Arab Games	Doha, Qatar	5th	20 km walk	1:45:54
2012	World Race Walking Cup	Saransk, Russia	71st	20 km walk	1:29:05
2012	African Championships	Porto-Novo, Benin	1st	20 km walk	?

== See also ==
- List of champions of the African Championships in Athletics
