= South Africa at the 2011 World Championships in Athletics =

- WA code: RSA
- National federation: Athletics South Africa
- Website: www.athletics.org.za

in Daegu
- Competitors: 32
- Medals: Gold 0 Silver 2 Bronze 2 Total 4

World Championships in Athletics appearances
- 1993; 1995; 1997; 1999; 2001; 2003; 2005; 2007; 2009; 2011; 2013; 2015; 2017; 2019; 2022; 2023

South Africa competed at the 2011 World Championships in Athletics from 27 August to 4 September in Daegu, South Korea.

== Team selection ==
Athletics South Africa announced the final team of 26 athletes to represent the country in the event, including the established names such as Khotso Mokoena, LJ van Zyl, Caster Semenya and Mbulaeni Mulaudzi.

The final team on the entry list comprises the names of 33 athletes.

The following athletes appeared on the preliminary Entry List, but not on the Official Start List of the specific event, resulting in a total number of 32 competitors:

KEY:	Did not participate	Competed in another event

	Event	Athlete
Men	4 x 100 metres relay	Simon Magakwe
Men	4 x 100 metres relay	Lebogang Moeng
Men	4 x 100 metres relay	Gideon Trotter
Men	4 x 400 metres relay	Cornel Fredericks

== Medalists ==
The following competitors from South Africa won medals at the Championships

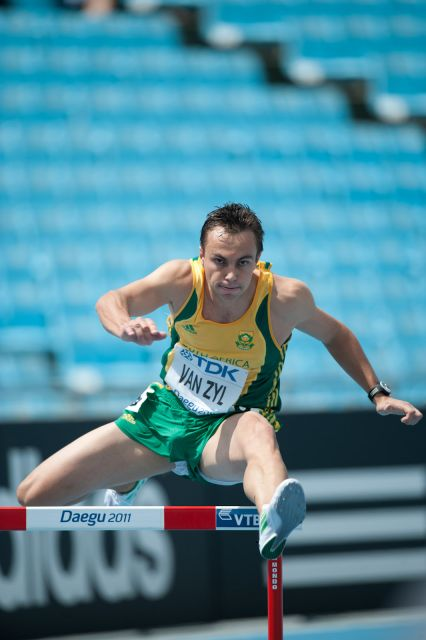
LJ van Zyl led the 4 x 400 metres relay team to silver and won a bronze medal in the 400 m hurdles event

Medal	Athlete	Event
Silver	Shane Victor; Ofentse Mogawane; Willem de Beer; LJ van Zyl; Oscar Pistorius	4 x 400 metres relay
Silver	Caster Semenya	800 metres
Bronze	LJ van Zyl	400 m hurdles
Bronze	Sunette Viljoen	Javelin throw

== Results ==
=== Men ===
Athlete	Event	Preliminaries		Heats		Semifinals		Final	
Athlete	Event	Time Width Height	Rank	Time Width Height	Rank	Time Width Height	Rank	Time Width Height	Rank
Simon Magakwe	100 metres			10.53	32	Did not advance			
Thuso Mpuang	200 metres			21.07	37	Did not advance			
Lebogang Moeng	200 metres			21.09	38	Did not advance			
Oscar Pistorius	400 metres			45.39	14	46.19	22	Did not advance	
Elroy Gelant	5000 metres			13:48.33	20			Did not advance	
Stephen Mokoka	10,000 metres							28:51.97	13
Coolboy Ngamole	Marathon							2:30:01	46
Modike Lucky Mohale	Marathon							2:38:22 SB	50
David Ngakane	Marathon							DNF	
Lehann Fourie	110 m hurdles			13.86	27	Did not advance			
LJ van Zyl	400 m hurdles			48.58	3 Q	49.05	7 Q	48.80	3rd place, bronze medalist(s)
Cornel Fredericks	400 m hurdles			48.52	1 Q	48.83	4 Q	49.12	5
Ruben Ramolefi	3000 metres steeplechase			8:11.50	2 Q			8:30.47	13
Hannes Dreyer; Ofentse Mogawane; Roscoe Engel; Thuso Mpuang	4 x 100 metres relay			38.72 SB	11			Did not advance	
Shane Victor; Ofentse Mogawane; Willem de Beer; LJ van Zyl; Oscar Pistorius	4 x 400 metres relay			2:59.21 NR	3			2:59.87	2nd place, silver medalist(s)
Luvo Manyonga	Long jump	8.04	10					8.21	5
Godfrey Khotso Mokoena	Long jump	8.00	15					Did not advance	
Tumelo Thagane	Triple jump	NM						Did not advance	
Robert Oosthuizen	Javelin throw	73.14	33					Did not advance	

Decathlon

Willem Coertzen	Decathlon			
Willem Coertzen	Event	Results	Points	Rank
	100 m	11.16	825	20
	Long jump	7.37 SB	903	9
	Shot put	13.48	697	23
	High jump	2.02	822	7
	400 m	49.20	852	9
	110 m hurdles	14.48	913	10
	Discus throw	43.13 PB	728	19
	Pole vault	NM	0	
	Javelin throw	DNS		
	1500 m	DNS		
Total			DNF	

=== Women ===
Athlete	Event	Preliminaries		Heats		Semifinals		Final	
Athlete	Event	Time Width Height	Rank	Time Width Height	Rank	Time Width Height	Rank	Time Width Height	Rank
Caster Semenya	800 metres			2:01.01	5	1:58.07 SB	1	1:56.35 SB	1st place, gold medalist(s)
René Kalmer	Marathon							2:38:16	31
Annerien van Schalkwyk	Marathon							2:43:59 SB	37
Tanith Maxwell	Marathon							DNS	
Wenda Theron	400 m hurdles			56.13	17 Q	57.06	23	Did not advance	
Simoné du Toit	Shot put	15.83	24					Did not advance	
Sunette Viljoen	Javelin throw	65.34	2					68.38 AR	3rd place, bronze medalist(s)
Justine Robbeson	Javelin throw	58.08	19					Did not advance	
