= Jenna Challenor =

South African long-distance runner

Personal information
- Born: 6 July 1981 (age 45)

Sport
- Country: South Africa
- Sport: Athletics
- Event: long-distance running

Achievements and titles
- Personal bests: Half marathon – 1:14:20 (2014); Marathon – 2:36:50 (2020)

Jenna Leigh Challenor (born 6 July 1981) is a South African long-distance runner. She competed in the marathon event at the 2017 World Championships in Athletics in London, UK, finishing 59th.

Her personal best times are 1:14:19 in the half marathon (2014); and 2:36:50 in the marathon (2020).

== See also ==
- South Africa at the 2017 World Championships in Athletics
