= Misgana Wakuma =

Ethiopian racewalker

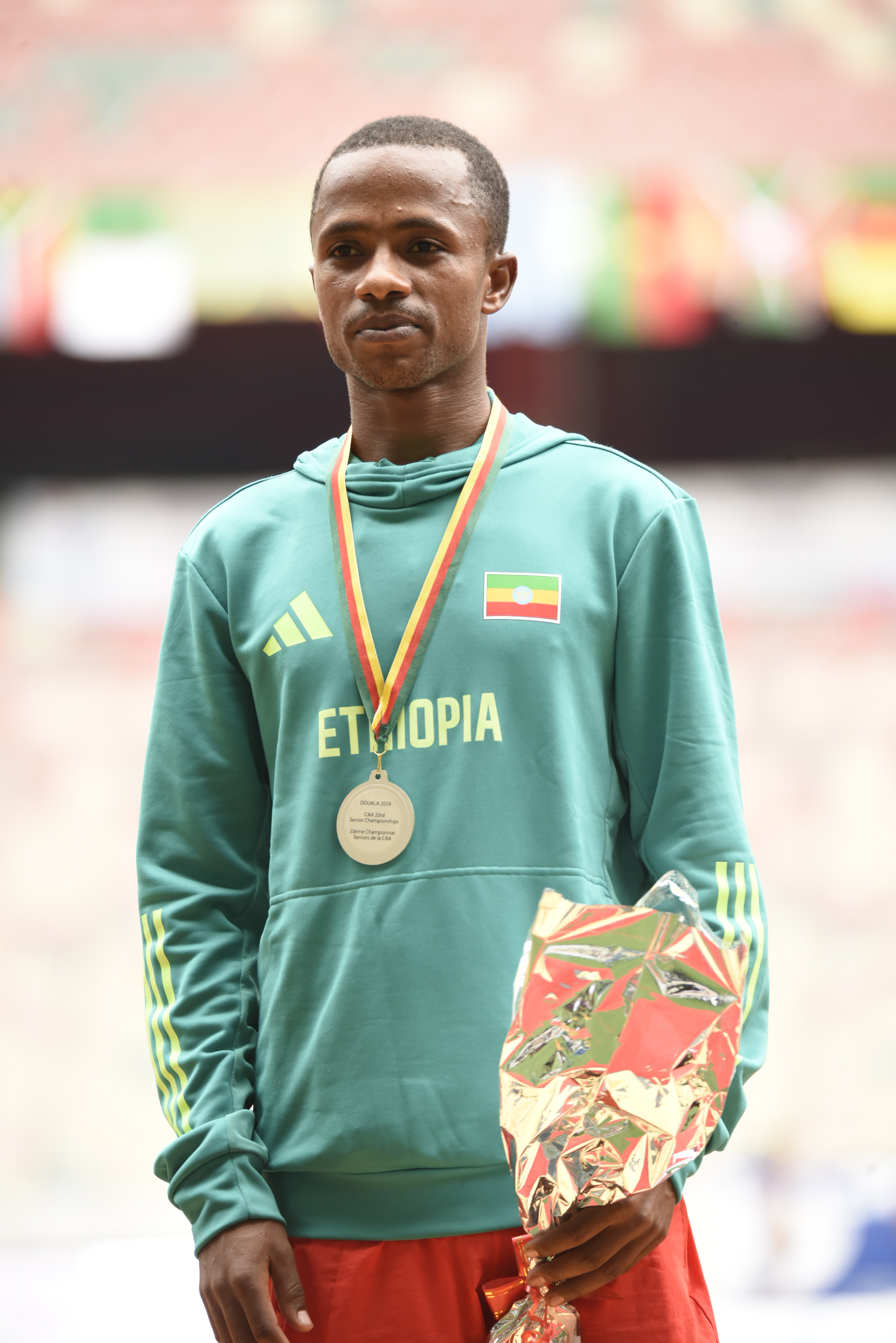
- Wakuma in 2024

Personal information
- Born: Misgana Wakuma Fekansa; 5 July 2004 (age 22) Ethiopia

Sport
- Country: Ethiopia
- Sport: Track and field
- Event: Racewalking

Achievements and titles
- Olympic finals: 2024 Paris; 20 km walk (6th)
- Personal best: Racewalking: 1:19.31 (2024)
Medal record
Racewalking
Representing Ethiopia
World Team Championships
Silver medal – second place	2026 Brasília	Half marathon walk
African Games
Gold medal – first place	2023 Accra	20 km walk
African U20 Championships
Gold medal – first place	2023 Ndola	10,000 m walk
African Championships
Gold medal – first place	2024 Douala	20 km walk
Gold medal – first place	2026 Accra	20 km walk

Misgana Wakuma Fekansa (born 5 July 2004) is an Ethiopian racewalker. He competed in the men's 20 km walk event at the 2024 Summer Olympics.
