= John Adesola =

South African athlete (born 2002)

Personal information
- Nationality: South African
- Born: 8 April 2002 (age 24)
- Height: 1.83 m (6 ft 0 in)

Sport
- Sport: Athletics
- Event: Hurdles

Achievements and titles
- Personal bests: 60mH 7.82 (Houston, 2025); 110mH: 13.24 (Music City Track Carnival, Ray Conn Sports Complex, Cleveland, TN (USA), 30 May 2026)

John Adesola (born 8 April 2002) is a South African hurdler. He competed over 110 metres hurdles at the 2025 World Athletics Championships.

Career

Junior Career

Growing up in Pretoria, South Africa, John participated and excelled in athletics during his primary and high school years in Pretoria, South Africa.

During his undergraduate studies at the University of Pretoria, John became the men's under 20 South African 110m hurdles national champion in April 2021. Unfortunately, he could not compete at the 2021 World Athletics U20 Championships, which was held from 18 to 22 August 2021 at the Moi International Sports Centre in Nairobi, Kenya due to a bureaucratic travel document delay and the COVID-19 Pandemic quarantine period requirements.

Senior Career and Injury in South Africa

John suffered a broken toe in 2022. This severe injury disrupted his hurdles training and competitive consistency. He only competed in the 100m and 4 × 100 m relays for men in 2023, where he was selected for the Athletics Gauteng North ("AGN") team to compete at the Athletics South Africa Senior Track & Field National Championships, where he came third in the second semi-final 100m for Men and was part of the gold medal winning AGN A team in the 4 × 100 m relay for men, together with Thembo Monareng, Sinesipho Dambile and Eckhart Potgieter.

Collegiate Career in the United States of America

While John was navigating training disruptions and recovering from a broken toe, the University of New Orleans (UNO) track and field program already had another South African athlete on its roster. This teammate knew John from the South African athletics circuit and recognized his elite ceiling. He formally recommended John to the UNO coaching staff, acting as an intermediary and urging them to take a look at his past junior performance data. Upon reviewing his times and speaking with him, the coaching staff realized that while John was a formidable athlete, his personality and strong character made him an ideal fit to elevate the culture of the team. His breakout 2024 outdoor season with the University of New Orleans was actually his first full, healthy season of hurdles competition since the 2022 injury.

Competing for the University of New Orleans, John finished his 2024 season 13th in the NCAA in the 110-meter hurdles - the best finish by any Privateer at an NCAA Outdoor Championship in school history. John is the only Privateer in school history to qualify for the NCAA Regionals in three events. Although he did not run in the 100 metres in Lexington, his 10.22 100 meter time at 2024's Texas Relays was No. 11 in school history and No. 41 on the NCAA's East qualifying list. The South African was named the 2024 Southland Conference Outdoor Newcomer of the Year and secured First Team All-Conference honors. He won the 2024 Southland Conference Outdoor Championships in the 110-meter hurdles with a time of 13.872 seconds, narrowly defeating his teammate Jorim Léonard Bangue Bangue by 0.006 seconds. He also ran the opening leg of the Privateers' 4×100-meter relay squad alongside Darryl George Jr., Madonna Favour, and Christopher Murphy, claiming a bronze medal at the conference championships in 39.54 seconds. At the NCAA East Regional quarterfinals, he set an individual school record with a time of 13.60 in the 110 metres hurdles, and the relay team broke the school record with a time of 39.405 seconds, finishing just one spot shy of national qualification. He ultimately qualified for the 2024 NCAA Outdoor Championships in Eugene, Oregon in June 2024, running 13.56 seconds in his semi-final, setting a new individual school record for the third time in the season.

After transferring to the Houston Cougars track and field at the University of Houston in 2025, he finished in third place overall at the NCAA Outdoor Championships over 110 metres hurdles in Eugene, Oregon in June 2025, running 13.43 seconds in the semi-final and a then-personal best of 13.28 seconds in the final to secure First Team All-American honors, finishing just ahead of fellow Cougar teammate Jamar Marshall Jr.

NCAA All-American honors

John Adesola has earned NCAA All-American honors exclusively in the 110-metre hurdles, achieving this distinction twice during his collegiate career. His All-American accolades include: First Team All-American (2025): He earned this honor while competing for the University of Houston. He placed third in the 110-metre hurdles final at the NCAA Outdoor Track and Field Championships, clocking a personal-best time of 13.28 seconds to take the bronze medal

Second Team All-American (2024): He received this honor during his single season at the University of New Orleans. He qualified for the NCAA Outdoor Championships and finished in the top 15 (sources cite 11th or 13th place), which secured his Second Team status.

While he was a highly decorated athlete in other events—such as winning the Big 12 indoor 60-metre title and earning All-Conference honors in the 4x100-metre relay—his All-American status is specifically tied to his performances in the hurdles.

Post NCAA athletic eligibility career in the USA

Following the conclusion of the 2025 outdoor season, Adesola fully exhausted his NCAA athletic eligibility and began competing unattached. He continues to train independently with the target of qualifying for the 2028 Summer Olympics in Los Angeles. On 30 May 2026, competing unattached at the Music City Track Carnival at the Ray Conn Sports Complex in Cleveland, Tennessee, Adesola won the 110-meter hurdles with a lifetime personal best of 13.24 seconds. This mark tied him with Lehann Fourie (who ran 13.24 seconds on 7 September 2012) for the second-fastest time in South African and African athletic history, trailing only the continental and national record, as listed on List of South African records in athletics of 13.11 seconds set by Antonio Alkana on 15 June 2017.

Continuing his 2026 outdoor campaign on the U.S. circuit, Adesola competed at the USATF Lone Star Grand Prix held at Cushing Stadium in College Station, Texas, on 6 June 2026. In the 110-meter hurdles final, he placed fourth with a time of 13.38 seconds, finishing in a competitive field behind Jamar Marshall (13.04), De'Vion Wilson (13.24), and Connor Schulman (13.29), while placing ahead of Eric Edwards, Louis Rollins, Rasheem Brown, Tade Ojora, and Johnny Brackins. On 14 June 2026, he competed at the USATF Los Angeles Grand Prix, finishing seventh in the 110-meter hurdles final in 13.47 seconds. The race featured an elite international field, including winner Jamal Britt, runner-up Trey Cunningham, Cordell Tinch (third), Jamar Marshall (fourth), Johnny Brackins (fifth), and Great Britain's Tade Ojora (sixth).

Representing South Africa internationally

John represented South Africa at the 2025 World Athletics Championships in Tokyo, Japan in September 2025, running 13.57 seconds without qualifying for the semi-final.

== Personal life ==
He is of Nigerian descent. During his high school career (2015-2019), John attended Maragon Mooikloof, an Independent Combined School in Pretoria, South Africa, which is branded under the ADvTECH Group, where he was the deputy head boy in 2019. After high school, he studied at the University of Pretoria before his departure to the United States of America. In the fall of 2025, he enrolled as a graduate student at the University of Houston's College of Natural Sciences and Mathematics, where he is pursuing a Master of Science in Statistics and Data Science. John has an older brother, who was also a very talented provincial sprinting athlete during his school career.
