= Samuel Gathimba =

Kenyan racewalker (born 1987)

Personal information
- Born: 26 October 1987 (age 38) Nyeri County, Kenya
- Height: 1.65 m (5 ft 5 in)
- Weight: 57 kg (126 lb)

Sport
- Country: Kenya
- Sport: Athletics
- Event: Men's 20km Walk
Medal record
Men's athletics
Representing Kenya
Commonwealth Games
Bronze medal – third place	2018 Gold Coast	20 km walk
African Games
Gold medal – first place	2019 Rabat	20 km walk
Silver medal – second place	2015 Brazzaville	20 km walk
Silver medal – second place	2023 Accra	20 km walk
African Championships
Gold medal – first place	2016 Durban	20 km walk
Gold medal – first place	2018 Asaba	20 km walk
Gold medal – first place	2022 Saint Pierre	20 km walk
Silver medal – second place	2014 Marrakesh	20 km walk

Samuel Ireri Gathimba (born 26 October 1987) is a Kenyan racewalking athlete. He was the 20 kilometres walk gold medallist at the African Championships in Athletics in 2016. He holds a personal best of 1:19:24 hours.

Gathimba emerged at international level in 2014, taking a silver medal at the 2014 African Championships in Athletics behind Lebogang Shange of South Africa. He set a personal best of 1:23:59 hours to place second at the national championships that year, behind David Kimutai. He topped the podium at the 2015 national trials with a new best of 1:23:12 hours, which ranked him in the world's top 100 for the first time. He again demonstrated his place among the continent's best at the 2015 African Games where he lost out on the gold to Shange by a margin of one second.

The 2016 season proved to be a breakthrough for Gathimba. At the 2016 African Championships in Athletics he was a gold medallist by a large margin, crossing the line in a championship record of 1:19:24 hours. This was a Kenyan record and was 22 seconds off Hatem Ghoula's near two-decade-old African best.

He has qualified to represent Kenya at the 2020 Summer Olympics.

== International competitions ==
Year	Competition	Venue	Position	Event	Notes
2014	African Championships	Marrakesh, Morocco	2nd	20 km walk	1:27:11
2015	African Games	Brazzaville, Republic of the Congo	2nd	20 km walk	1:26:44
2016	African Championships	Durban, South Africa	1st	20 km walk	1:19:24 CR
2018	Commonwealth Games	Gold Coast, Australia	3rd	20 km walk	1:19:51
2018	African Championships	Asaba, Nigeria	1st	20 km walk	1:25:14
2019	African Games	Rabat, Morocco	1st	20 km walk	1:22:48
2022	African Championships	Port Louis, Mauritius	1st	20 km walk	1:22:01
2024	African Games	Accra, Ghana	2nd	20 km walk	1:28:06

== National titles ==
- Kenyan Athletics Championships
  - 20 km walk: 2015
