= Masoud Khamis Rahman =

Qatari sprinter

Personal information
- Nationality: Qatari
- Born: 11 September 1974 (age 51)

Sport
- Sport: Sprinting
- Event: 4 × 400 metres relay
Medal record
Men's athletics
Representing Qatar
Asian Championships
Bronze medal – third place	1995 Jakarta	4×100 m

Masoud Khamis Hassan Rahman (Arabic: مسعود خميس حسن, born 11 September 1974) is a Qatari sprinter. He competed in the men's 4 × 400 metres relay at the 1992 Summer Olympics.
