= 2026 World Athletics U20 Championships – Men's 5000 metres walk =

Men's 5000 metres walk at the 2026 World Athletics U20 Championships
- Venue: Hayward Field
- Dates: 8 August (Final)
- Competitors: 41 from 26 nations
- Winning time: 18:40.37 WU20R

Medalists
gold medal	Isaac Beacroft	Australia
silver medal	Pu Huajia	China
bronze medal	Nicolo' Vidal	Italy

The men's 5000 metres walk at the 2026 World Athletics U20 Championships was held at Hayward Field in Eugene, United States on 8 August 2026.

== Results ==
=== Final ===
The final took place in the morning session on 8 August 2026.

Key:	~ Red card for loss of contact	> Red card for bent knee

Place	Athlete	Nation	Time	Red cards	Notes
1st place, gold medalist(s)	Isaac Beacroft	Australia	18:40.37	~	WU20R
2nd place, silver medalist(s)	Pu Huajia	China	18:43.70	~	AU20R
3rd place, bronze medalist(s)	Nicolo' Vidal	Italy	18:56.19	~ ~	PB
4	Naoto Roppongi	Japan	19:24.43	~ ~ ~	PB
5	Séamus Clarke	Ireland	19:28.27	~	PB
6	Nitin Gupta	India	19:32.30	~ ~ ~	
7	Osvaldo Miramontes	Mexico	19:34.07	~ ~	AU20R
8	Beom-su Seo	South Korea	19:37.37	~ ~	PB
9	Lo Sheng-Qin	Chinese Taipei	19:43.47	~ >	PB
10	Clement Rabreau	France	19:47.14	~	PB
11	Cesar Hidalgo	Spain	19:47.58		PB
12	Sebastia Vinicio Barrera Quinde	Ecuador	19:53.75		PB
13	Alessio Coppola	Italy	19:54.24		
14	Mohamed Amin Mejri	Tunisia	19:58.57	~ ~	PB
15	Pablo Zárate	Spain	20:08.73		PB
16	Przemysław Jasiński	Poland	20:10.32	>	PB
17	Owen Toyne	Australia	20:18.27	>	
18	Jakub Mažgút	Slovakia	20:18.44		PB
19	Negero Adugna	Ethiopia	20:22.82	~	PB
20	Shi Chengxi	China	20:25.19		PB
21	Matthew Newell	Ireland	20:26.11		
22	Ziad Sherif Anis Hassan	Egypt	20:27.06		NU20R
23	Illia Tyshkevych	Ukraine	20:29.05		
24	Chen Ruei-Kai	Chinese Taipei	20:36.62	~	
25	Mohamed Amine Naiji	Tunisia	20:43.03	~ ~ ~	
26	Joel Peltonen	Finland	20:47.10	~	
27	Seong-in Song	South Korea	20:50.95		PB
28	Davi Gabriel Bastos	Brazil	21:01.99		
29	George Efrain Espinoza	Peru	21:16.97		
30	Vitalii Tarasiuk	Ukraine	21:17.59		
31	Sergio Nieto	Colombia	21:24.00		
32	Patrik Pivarski	Croatia	21:27.22		
33	Gael Plasencia	United States	21:31.81	>	
34	Youssef Mohsen Ramadan	Egypt	21:31.90	~ ~ ~	
35	Derian Jair Robalino Cordona	Ecuador	21:39.17	~	
36	Yegor Strukov	Kazakhstan	21:39.40	~	
37	Denis Jared Estrada Collado	Guatemala	23:48.17	>	
38	Sherkhan Egizbay	Kazakhstan	27:31.77	>	
—	José Ccoscco	Peru	DNF	~ ~	
—	Toshiya Inoue	Japan	DQ	~ ~ ~ ~	TR54.7.5
—	Emiliano Barba	Mexico	DQ	~ > ~ ~	TR54.7.5
