= Desmond Mokgobu =

South African long-distance runner

Personal information
- Born: 23 November 1988 (age 37)

Sport
- Country: South Africa
- Sport: Track and field
- Event: long-distance running
- Updated on 29 August 2015

Pheeha Desmond Mokgobo (or Mokgobu) (born 23 November 1988) is a male South African long-distance runner. He competed in the marathon event at the 2015 World Championships in Athletics in Beijing, China, finishing 41st. In the following World Championships, held in London in 2017, he completed the marathon in 2:16:14, ranking in the 21st place.

== See also ==
- South Africa at the 2015 World Championships in Athletics
- South Africa at the 2017 World Championships in Athletics
