= Julius Sawe =

Kenyan racewalker

Personal information
- Full name: Julius Sawe Kipkoech
- Nationality: Kenyan
- Born: 21 November 1971 (age 54)

Sport
- Sport: Athletics
- Event: Racewalking
Medal record
Men's athletics
Representing Kenya
African Championships
Gold medal – first place	2004 Brazzaville	20 km walk

Julius Sawe Kipkoech (born 21 November 1971) is a Kenyan racewalker. He competed in the men's 20 kilometres walk at the 1996 Summer Olympics and the 2000 Summer Olympics.
