= Thabiso Benedict Moeng =

South African long-distance runner

Personal information
- Born: 25 January 1983 (age 43)

Sport
- Country: South Africa
- Sport: Track and field
- Event: long-distance running
- Updated on 29 August 2015

Thabiso Benedict Moeng (born 25 January 1983) is a male South African long-distance runner. He competed in the marathon event at the 2015 World Championships in Athletics in Beijing, China, but did not finish. In 2019, he competed in the men's marathon at the 2019 World Athletics Championships held in Doha, Qatar. He did not finish his race.

== See also ==
- South Africa at the 2015 World Championships in Athletics
