= Athletics at the 2023 African Games – Men's 20 kilometres walk =

Men's 20 kilometres walk at the 2023 African Games
- Location: Accra, Ghana
- Dates: 20 March
- Competitors: 13 from 8 nations
- Winning time: 1:28:05

Medalists
gold medal	Misganaw Wakuma	Ethiopia
silver medal	Samuel Gathimba	Kenya
bronze medal	Ismail Benhammouda	Algeria

The men's 20 kilometres walk event at the 2023 African Games was held on 20 March 2024 in Accra, Ghana.

== Results ==
Rank	Name	Nationality	Time	Penalties	Notes
1st place, gold medalist(s)	Misganaw Wakuma	Ethiopia	1:28:05	~~~	
2nd place, silver medalist(s)	Samuel Gathimba	Kenya	1:28:06		
3rd place, bronze medalist(s)	Ismail Benhammouda	Algeria	1:31:12		
4	Dominic Ndingiti	Kenya	1:34:51		
5	Melse Mulu	Ethiopia	1:35:15	~	
6	Sizwe Ndebele	South Africa	1:38:08	>	
7	Mohamed Ragab Saleh	Egypt	1:39:53		
8	Oussama Farhat	Tunisia	1:46:06	~>	
9	Armand Bazoungoula	Republic of the Congo	1:51:30		
10	John Domici Dadzie	Ghana	1:53:07		
	Seth Arthur	Ghana	DNF		
	Bisetegn Matebia	Ethiopia	DNF		
	Bensaha Aymen	Algeria	DNF	~~>	
