= David Kimutai =

Kenyan race walker

Medal record

Men's athletics

Representing Kenya

African Championships
Gold medal – first place	2006 Bambous	20 km walk
Silver medal – second place	1996 Yaoundé	20 km walk
Silver medal – second place	2010 Nairobi	20 km walk
Silver medal – second place	2012 Porto-Novo	20 km walk

David Kimutai Rotich (born 19 August 1969) is a Kenyan race walker. He is an African Champion, All-Africa Games winner, Commonwealth Games medalist and has competed twice at the Olympics.

Kimutai was born in Sotik. He began his athletics career by competing in long distance running, particularly 10000 metres, but without much success. He then switched to race walking. His personal record in 20 km walk (1:20:40) was set at the Kenyan Championships in 1996.

== International competitions ==
Year	Competition	Venue	Position	Event	Notes
1995	All-Africa Games	Harare, Zimbabwe	2nd	20 km walk	1:31:02
1996	African Championships	Yaoundé, Cameroon	2nd	20 km walk	1:30:05
1996	Olympic Games	Atlanta, United States	23rd	20 km walk	1:25:01
1998	Commonwealth Games	Kuala Lumpur, Malaysia	5th	20 km walk	1:26:57
1999	All-Africa Games	Johannesburg, South Africa	1st	20 km walk	1:29:12
2000	Olympic Games	Sydney, Australia	39th	20 km walk	1:28:45
2002	Commonwealth Games	Manchester, United Kingdom	3rd	20 km walk	1:28.20
2006	Commonwealth Games	Melbourne, Australia	4th	20 km walk	1:25:42
2006	African Championships	Bambous, Mauritius	1st	20 km walk	1:23:58
2007	All-Africa Games	Algiers, Algeria	2nd	20 km walk	1:24:16
2008	African Championships	Addis Ababa, Ethiopia	4th	20 km walk	1:25:08
2008	Olympic Games	Beijing, China	19th	20 km walk	1:22:21
2009	World Championships	Berlin, Germany	32nd	20 km walk	1:26:35
2010	African Championships	Nairobi, Kenya	2nd	20 km walk	1:21:07
2010	Commonwealth Games	New Delhi, India	4th	20 km walk	1:25:29
2011	World Championships	Daegu, South Korea	32nd	20 km walk	1:27:20
2012	African Championships	Porto-Novo, Benin	2nd	20 km walk	?
2014	African Championships	Marrakesh, Morocco	5th	20 km walk	1:29:16
2015	African Games	Brazzaville, Republic of the Congo	4th	20 km walk	1:29:54
