= Sibusiso Nzima =

South African long-distance runner

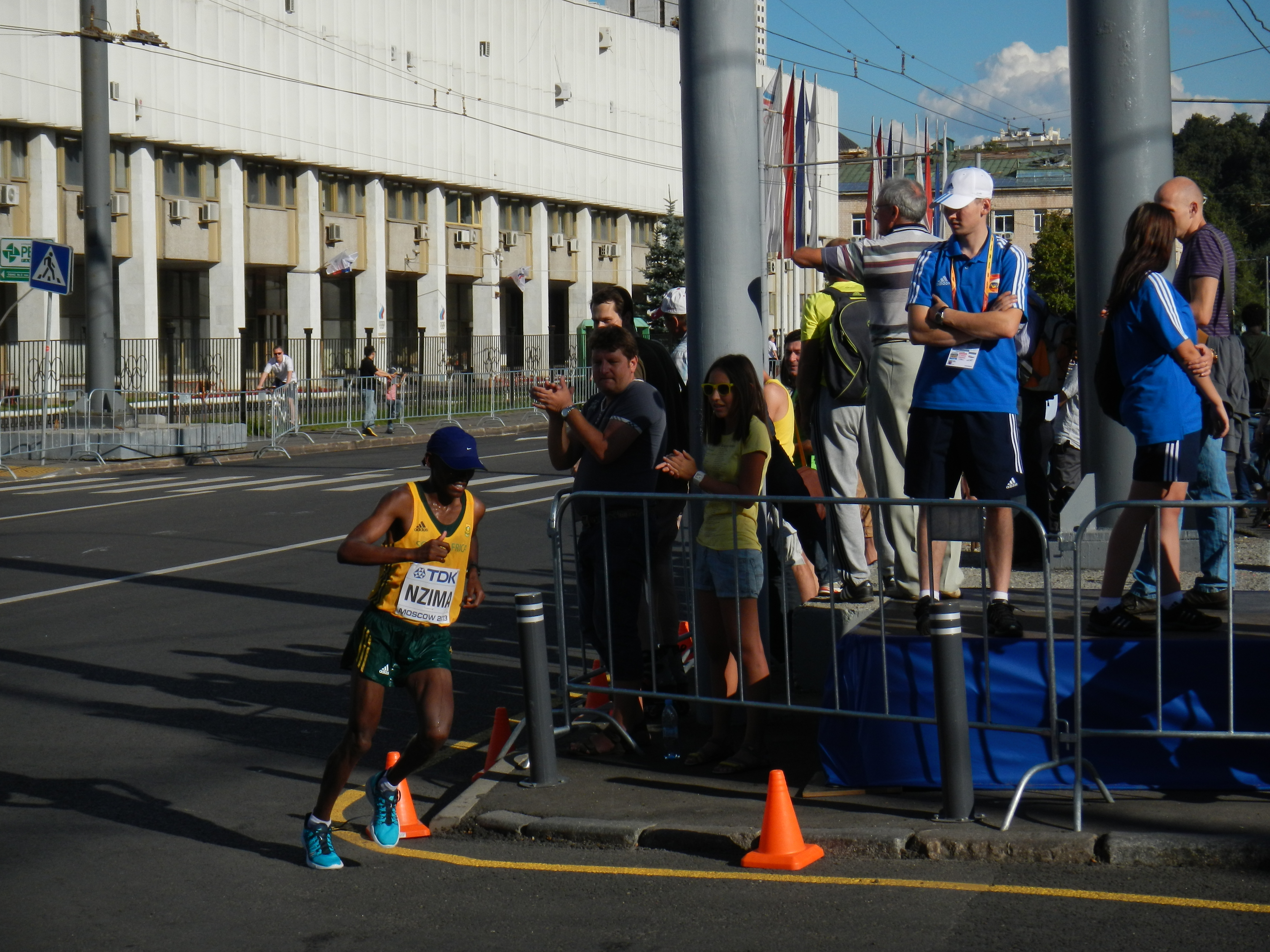

Personal information
- Born: 23 November 1986 (age 39)
- Height: 164 cm (5 ft 5 in)
- Weight: 57 kg (126 lb)

Sport
- Country: South Africa
- Sport: Track and field
- Event: Marathon

Sibusiso Nzima (born 23 November 1986) is a South African long-distance runner who specialises in the marathon. He competed in the marathon event at the 2015 World Championships in Athletics in Beijing, China.

He competed in the marathon at the 2016 Summer Olympics in Rio de Janeiro. He finished in 97th place with a time of 2:25:33. He also competed at the August 2017 London IAAF World Championships men's marathon however he failed to finish.
