= Hatem Ghoula =

Tunisian racewalker (born 1973)

- Hatem Ghoula in 2013

Personal information
- Native name: حاتم غولة
- Born: Hatem Ghoula; 7 June 1973 (age 53) Paris, France
Medal record
Men's athletics
Representing Tunisia
World Championships
Bronze medal – third place	2007 Osaka	20 km walk
African Championships
Gold medal – first place	1996 Yaoundé	20 km walk
Gold medal – first place	1998 Dakar	20 km walk
Gold medal – first place	2000 Algiers	20 km walk
Gold medal – first place	2002 Radès	20 km walk
Silver medal – second place	2006 Bambous	20 km walk

Hatem Ghoula (Arabic: حاتم غولة; born 7 June 1973) is a Tunisian race walker. He won four consecutive African Championships in the 20 kilometres walk from 1996 to 2002. His foremost medal was a 20 km walk bronze at the 2007 World Championships in Athletics. He is also a two-time gold medallist at the All-African Games, having won in 2003 and 2007 (the latter in a Games record time).

Ghoula was born in Paris, France. He has represented Tunisia at four Olympic Games (1996 to 2008), with his best performance of eleventh place coming in 2004. He competed at the IAAF World Championships in Athletics for eight straight editions from 1993 to 2007 and made his ninth appearance at the 2013 World Championships in Athletics. At the IAAF World Race Walking Cup he has participated on five occasions and came close to a medal in 2006, finishing in fourth place.

He is a two-time gold medallist at the African Race Walking Championships and the Jeux de la Francophonie, and was the champion at the 2004 Arab Games and 2001 Mediterranean Games.

He holds the African records in racewalking for the distance of 20,000 metres on the track and 20 km walk on the road.

== International competitions ==
Year	Competition	Venue	Position	Event	Notes
Representing Tunisia
1992	Arab Junior Championships	Latakia, Syria	2nd	10,000 m	49:47
1993	World Championships	Stuttgart, Germany	32nd	20 km	1:33:24
1994	Jeux de la Francophonie	Bondoufle, France	4th	20 km	1:28:57
1995	Arab Championships	Cairo, Egypt	1st	20 km	1:37:50
1995	World Championships	Gothenburg, Sweden	30th	20 km	1:32:17
1996	African Championships	Yaoundé, Cameroon	1st	20 km	1:29:48
1996	Olympic Games	Atlanta, United States	33rd	20 km	1:25:52
1997	Mediterranean Games	Bari, Italy	3rd	20 km	1:25:36
1997	World Championships	Athens, Greece	9th	20 km	1:23:49
1997	Jeux de la Francophonie	Antananarivo, Madagascar	1st	20 km	1:26:39
1998	African Championships	Dakar, Senegal	1st	20 km	1:31:28
1999	World Race Walking Cup	Mézidon-Canon, France	15th	20 km	1:23:46
1999	Pan Arab Games	Irbid, Jordan	1st	20 km	1:40:01
1999	World Championships	Seville, Spain	16th	20 km	1:28:36
1999	All-Africa Games	Johannesburg, South Africa	–	20 km	DQ
2000	African Championships	Algiers, Algeria	1st	20 km	1:25:38
2000	Olympic Games	Sydney, Australia	36th	20 km	1:28:16
2001	Jeux de la Francophonie	Ottawa, Canada	1st	20 km	1:22:56
2001	World Championships	Edmonton, Canada	10th	20 km	1:23:14
2001	Mediterranean Games	Radès, Tunisia	1st	20 km	1:26:43
2002	World Race Walking Cup	Turin, Italy	9th	20 km	1:23:49
2002	African Championships	Radès, Tunisia	1st	20 km	1:26:42
2003	World Championships	Paris, France	14th	20 km	1:21:12
2003	All-Africa Games	Abuja, Nigeria	1st	20 km	1:30:32
2004	World Race Walking Cup	A Coruña, Spain	41st	20 km	1:24:56
2004	Olympic Games	Athens, Greece	11th	20 km	1:22:59
2004	Pan Arab Games	Algiers, Algeria	1st	20,000 m	1:28:34.19
2005	Mediterranean Games	Almería, Spain	–	20 km	DQ
2005	World Championships	Helsinki, Finland	5th	20 km	1:20:19
2006	World Race Walking Cup	A Coruña, Spain	4th	20 km	1:19:36
2006	African Championships	Bambous, Mauritius	2nd	20 km	1:25:02
2007	All-Africa Games	Algiers, Algeria	1st	20 km	1:22:33
2007	World Championships	Osaka, Japan	3rd	20 km	1:22:40
2008	World Race Walking Cup	Cheboksary, Russia	11th	20 km	1:19:54
2008	Olympic Games	Beijing, China	27th	20 km	1:23:44
2013	World Championships	Moscow, Russia	27th	20 km	1:25:41
2016	African Championships	Durban, South Africa	6th	20 km	1:25:54

== See also ==
- List of champions of the African Athletics Championships
