= Marc Mundell =

South African race walker

Personal information
- Born: 7 July 1983 (age 43) Pietermaritzburg, South Africa
- Height: 1.89 m (6 ft 2 1/2 in)
- Weight: 77 kg (170 lb)

Sport
- Sport: Athletics
- Event: Race walking
- Club: Athletics Gauteng North

Marc Mundell (born 7 July 1983) is a South African race walker. He competed in the 50 kilometres walk event at the 2012 Summer Olympics finishing 32nd overall with a time of 3:55:32. This is the new African record.

He competed in the 50 km walk at the 2020 Summer Olympics.

== Competition record ==
Year	Competition	Venue	Position	Event	Notes
Representing South Africa
2004	World Race Walking Cup	Naumburg, Germany	87th	20 km walk	1:35:09
2006	World Race Walking Cup	A Coruña, Spain	68th	20 km walk	1:30:04
2006	African Championships	Bambous, Mauritius	7th	20 km walk	1:32:30
2007	All-Africa Games	Algiers, Algeria	8th	20 km walk	1:38:26
2007	Universiade	Bangkok, Thailand	21st	20 km walk	1:40:26
2008	African Championships	Addis Ababa, Ethiopia	7th	20 km walk	1:32:21
2010	World Race Walking Cup	Chihuahua, Mexico	30th	50 km walk	4:14:42
2012	World Race Walking Cup	Saransk, Russia	26th	50 km walk	3:57:57
2012	African Championships	Porto-Novo, Benin	4th	20 km walk	?
2012	Olympic Games	London, United Kingdom	32nd	50 km walk	3:55:32 (AR)
2013	World Championships	Moscow, Russia	31st	50 km walk	3:57:55
2015	World Championships	Beijing, China	33rd	50 km walk	4:02:41
2016	African Championships	Durban, South Africa	12th	20 km walk	1:44:55
2016	Olympic Games	Rio de Janeiro, Brazil	38th	50 km walk	4:11:03
