= Lebogang Shange =

South African racewalker

Personal information
- Nationality: South Africa
- Born: 1 August 1990 (age 35)
- Height: 160 cm (5 ft 3 in)
- Weight: 56 kg (123 lb)

Sport
- Sport: Athletics
- Event: Race Walk
Medal record
Men's athletics
Representing South Africa
African Games
Gold medal – first place	2015 Brazzaville	20 km walk
African Championships
Gold medal – first place	2014 Marrakesh	20 km walk
Silver medal – second place	2018 Asaba	20 km walk
Bronze medal – third place	2016 Durban	20 km walk
- Updated on 26 August 2016

Lebogang Shange (born 1 August 1990) is a South African race walker. He competed at the 2016 Summer Olympics and won fourth place in the 2017 World Championships.

He personal best in the 20 kilometres walk is 1:19:18 set at the 2017 IAAF World Championship in London. This is the current national record.

Shange was arrested in 2019 for raping and assaulting a woman in Embalenhle, Mpumalanga. He was sentenced to 10 years in prison in 2023.

== Competition record ==
Year	Competition	Venue	Position	Event	Notes
Representing South Africa
2012	World Race Walking Cup	Taicang, China	76th	20 km walk	1:30:05
2013	World Championships	Moscow, Russia	–	20 km walk	DNF
2014	World Race Walking Cup	Taicang, China	61st	20 km walk	1:24:18
2014	African Championships	Marrakesh, Morocco	1st	20 km walk	1:26:58
2015	World Championships	Beijing, China	11th	20 km walk	1:21:43
2015	African Games	Brazzaville, Republic of the Congo	1st	20 km walk	1:26:43
2016	African Championships	Durban, South Africa	3rd	20 km walk	1:21:41
2016	Olympic Games	Rio de Janeiro, Brazil	44th	20 km walk	1:25:07
2018	Commonwealth Games	Gold Coast, Australia	9th	20 km walk	1:23:27
2018	African Championships	Asaba, Nigeria	2nd	20 km walk	1:25:25
