= Hassanine Sebei =

Tunisian racewalker (born 1984)

Personal information
- Born: January 21, 1984 (age 42)
- Height: 1.77 m (5 ft 9 1/2 in)
- Weight: 56 kg (123 lb)

Sport
- Country: Tunisia
- Sport: Athletics
- Event: 20km Race Walk
Medal record
Men's athletics
Representing Tunisia
All-Africa Games
Gold medal – first place	2011 Maputo	20 km walk
African Championships
Gold medal – first place	2010 Nairobi	20 km walk
Silver medal – second place	2004 Brazzaville	20 km walk
Silver medal – second place	2016 Durban	20 km walk
Bronze medal – third place	2008 Addis Ababa	20 km walk
Bronze medal – third place	2018 Asaba	20 km walk

Hassanine Sebei, Arabic: حسنين السباعي, (born 21 January 1984 in Tajerouine) is a Tunisian racewalker who specialises in the 20 kilometres race walk. He was the 2010 African champion and competed at the 2008 Summer Olympics and 2012 Summer Olympics.

He won the silver medal at the 2004 African Championships in Athletics. The following year he took gold medals at the 2005 Islamic Solidarity Games and the Pan Arab Championships, as well as bronze medals at both the Jeux de la Francophonie and the African Race Walking Championships.

He made his debut in the IAAF World Race Walking Cup the following year and finished 57th overall. He missed out on the medals at the 2006 African Championships in Athletics, taking fourth place in the event. Sebei took part in the 2007 World Championships in Athletics and came in 24th place, the second best African performer. Coached by Hatem Ghoula, he succeeded his tutor to the 20,000 m track walk title at the 2007 Pan Arab Games in November.

At the 2008 African Championships in Athletics in Addis Ababa he came in third place and he represented Tunisia at the 2008 Beijing Olympics later that year, where he was 34th in the 20 km walk. In 2009 he was fourth at the Mediterranean Games, had a top twenty finish at the World Championships and ended the year with a silver medal behind Hervé Davaux at the Jeux de la Francophonie. At the 2010 IAAF World Race Walking Cup he had his best global finish by coming in eleventh place. He won his first continental title at the 2010 African Championships in Athletics, setting a personal best and championship record of 1:20:36. He gave credit to his coach and fellow athlete Hatem Ghoula, saying: "He gives me a lot of advice and helps me a lot. He is an inspiration to me".
