= Simon Wachira =

Kenyan race walker (born 1984)

Personal information
- Full name: Simon Muriithi Wachira
- Born: 6 May 1984 (age 42)

Sport
- Country: Kenya
- Sport: Athletics

Simon Muriithi Wachira (born 6 May 1984) is a Kenyan race walker. He competed in the men's 20 kilometres walk at the 2016 Summer Olympics.
