= Tanith Maxwell =

South African distance runner

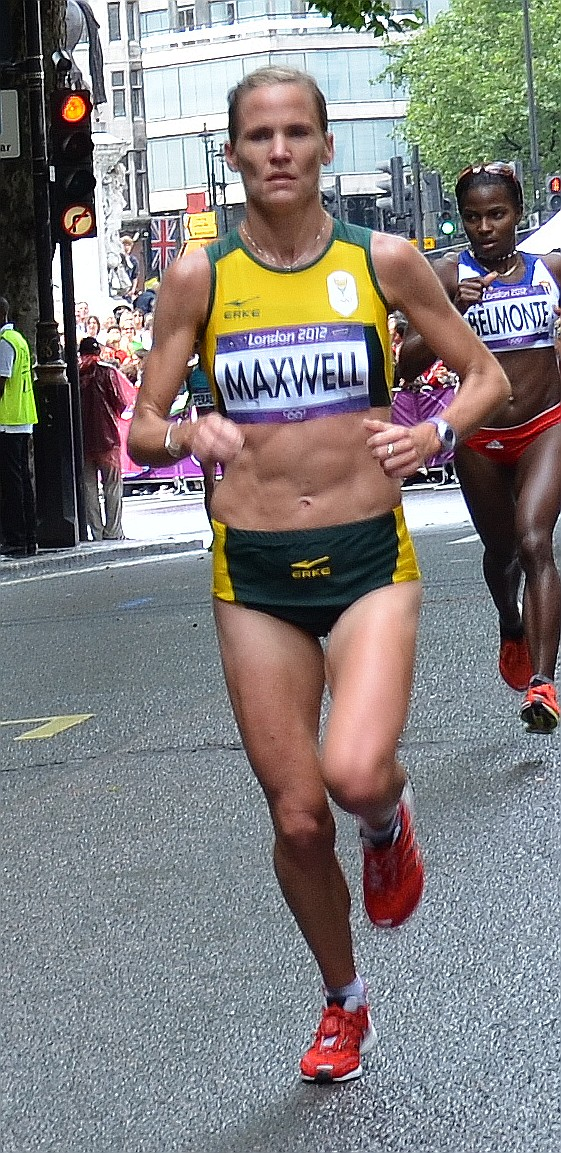
- Maxwell in the 2012 Summer Olympics marathon

Personal information
- Born: June 2, 1976 (age 50) Durban, South Africa
- Height: 167 cm (5 ft 6 in)
- Weight: 52 kg (115 lb)

Sport
- Country: South Africa
- Sport: Athletics
- Event: Marathon

Tanith Maxwell (born 2 June 1976 in Durban) is a female South African runner who has competed over distances ranging from 10 km to the marathon. She represented South Africa at the 2006 Commonwealth Games, Australia, 2007 All Africa Games, Algiers, 2007 World Athletic Championship, Japan, 2009 World Athletic Championship, Germany, 2010 World Athletic Championship, Korea (DNR due to injury), and the 2012 Summer Olympics, London, running in the marathon.

Maxwell has also competed in various races in Europe since 2004. She competed in the 2004 Edinburgh marathon, Scotland (2nd), 2005 Vienna City marathon, Austria (7th), 2005 South Africa half marathon championship, Durban (1st), 2005 Frankfurt City marathon, Germany (9th), 2006 Norton Radstock half marathon, UK (1st), 2006 Frankfurt City marathon, Germany (11th), 2007 South Africa marathon Championship, Port Elizabeth (2nd), 2007 All Africa half marathon, Algiers (10th), 2008 Rome City marathon, Italy (9th), 2008 Vienna City marathon, Austria (5th), 2008 Warsaw City marathon, Poland (4th), 2009 Warsaw half marathon, Poland (4th), 2010 Xiamen International half marathon, China (2nd), 2010 Bristol half marathon, UK (2nd), 2010 London marathon, UK (15th), 2010 Berlin marathon, Germany (8th), 2010 South Africa half marathon championship, Port Elizabeth (3rd), 2011 Reading half marathon, UK (7th), 2011 London marathon, UK (29th), and the 2012 Rotterdam marathon, Netherlands (13th).

== Personal best ==
- 10 km – 33.58
- 15 km – 51.22
- Half-Marathon – 1:18:27 – Alger, 22 June 2007
- Marathon – 2:32:33 – Berlin, 26 September 2010

== Sponsorship ==
- Boxer Superstores (Durban, South Africa)
- Adidas International, Adidas Eyewear
- Virgin Active (South Africa)
- PeptoPro (South Africa)
