= Wayne Snyman =

South African race walker

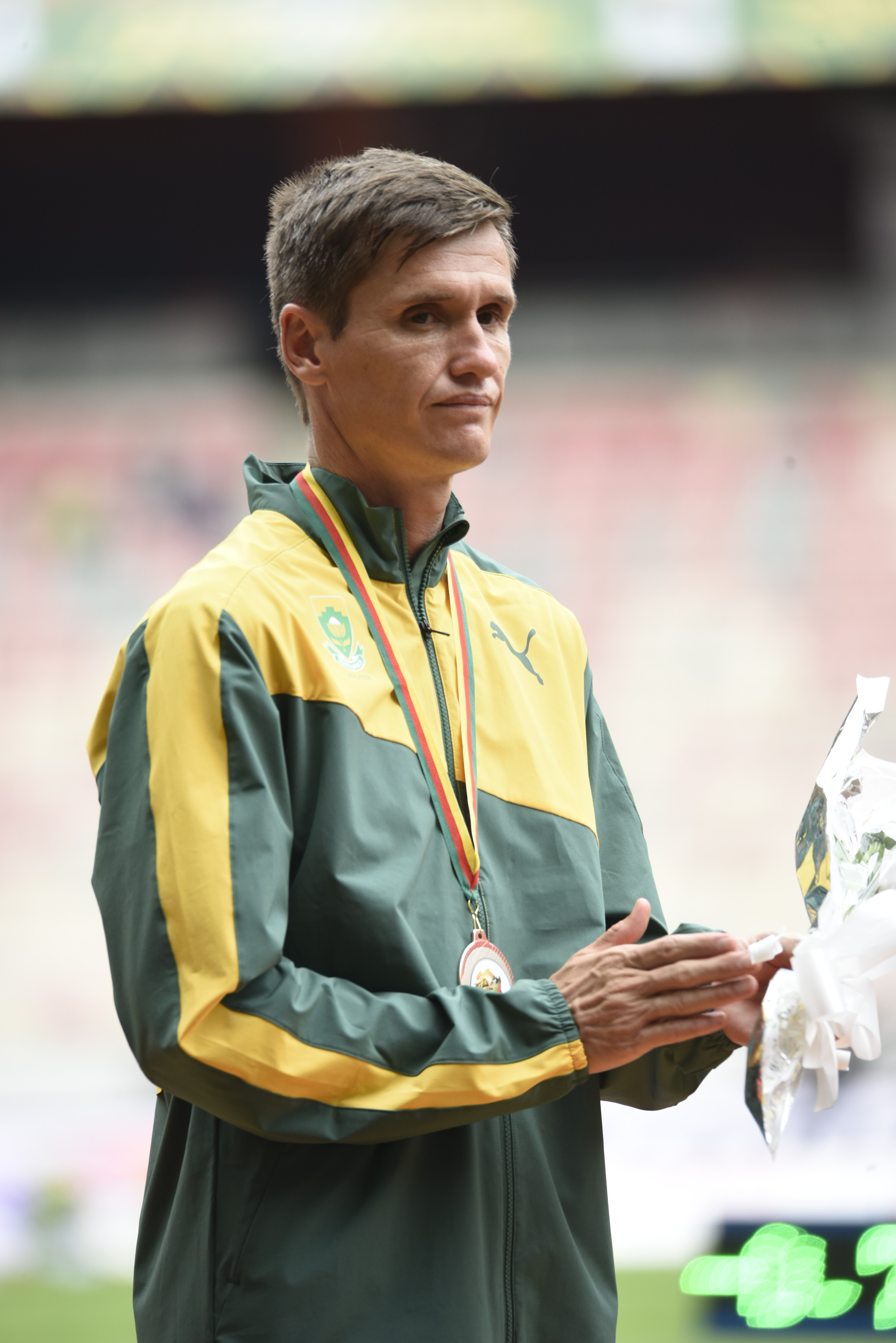

Personal information
- Nationality: South Africa
- Born: 8 March 1985 (age 41) Welkom, South Africa
- Height: 177 cm (5 ft 10 in)
- Weight: 65 kg (143 lb)
- Spouse: Nadelene Snyman

Sport
- Sport: Athletics
- Event: Race Walk
Medal record
Men's Athletics
Representing South Africa
African Games
| Bronze medal – third place | 2015 Brazzaville | 20 km walk |
African Championships
| Bronze medal – third place | 2024 Douala | 20,000 m walk |
- Updated on 25 August 2016

Wayne Snyman (born 8 March 1985 in Welkom) is a South African race walker. At the 2016 Summer Olympics, he competed in the Men's 20 km walk. He finished in 58th place with a time of 1:29:20. In 2019, he competed in the men's 20 kilometres walk at the 2019 World Athletics Championships held in Doha, Qatar. He finished in 38th place.

He competed in the men's 20 km walk at the 2020 Summer Olympics.
