= 2006 World Junior Championships in Athletics – Women's 400 metres hurdles =

The women's 400 metres hurdles event at the 2006 World Junior Championships in Athletics was held in Beijing, China, at Chaoyang Sports Centre on 15, 16 and 17 August.

== Medalists ==
Gold	Kaliese Spencer; Jamaica
Silver	Nicole Leach; United States
Bronze	Sherene Pinnock; Jamaica

== Results ==
=== Final ===
17 August

Rank	Name	Nationality	Time	Notes
1st place, gold medalist(s)	Kaliese Spencer	Jamaica	55.11	
2nd place, silver medalist(s)	Nicole Leach	United States	55.55	
3rd place, bronze medalist(s)	Sherene Pinnock	Jamaica	56.67	
4	Muna Jabir Adam	Sudan	57.03	
5	Ajoke Odumusu	Nigeria	57.38	
6	Anastasiya Ott	Russia	57.47	
7	Ghofrane Mohammad	Syria	58.49	
8	Perri Shakes-Drayton	Great Britain	59.37	

=== Semifinals ===
16 August

==== Semifinal 1 ====
Rank	Name	Nationality	Time	Notes
1	Nicole Leach	United States	56.10	Q
2	Sherene Pinnock	Jamaica	57.11	Q
3	Anastasiya Ott	Russia	57.19	Q
4	Ghofran Al-Mouhmad	Syria	57.42	Q
5	Sara Petersen	Denmark	57.65	
6	Wang Hui	China	57.69	
7	Lauren Boden	Australia	58.05	
8	Laetitia Denis	France	58.55	

==== Semifinal 2 ====
Rank	Name	Nationality	Time	Notes
1	Kaliese Spencer	Jamaica	56.11	Q
2	Muna Jabir Adam	Sudan	56.55	Q
3	Ajoke Odumusu	Nigeria	57.00	Q
4	Perri Shakes-Drayton	Great Britain	57.52	Q
5	Tina Polak	Poland	57.65	
6	Darya Korableva	Russia	58.16	
7	Frederike Schönfeld	Germany	58.64	
8	Ebony Collins	United States	60.70	

=== Heats ===
15 August

==== Heat 1 ====
Rank	Name	Nationality	Time	Notes
1	Kaliese Spencer	Jamaica	57.49	Q
2	Lauren Boden	Australia	57.95	Q
3	Ghofran Al-Mouhmad	Syria	58.00	Q
4	Perri Shakes-Drayton	Great Britain	58.04	q
5	Corri-Ann Campbell-Fell	Canada	59.22	
6	Aya Miyahara	Japan	60.10	
7	Amélie Auge	France	61.68	

==== Heat 2 ====
Rank	Name	Nationality	Time	Notes
1	Sherene Pinnock	Jamaica	57.39	Q
2	Anastasiya Ott	Russia	58.12	Q
3	Wang Hui	China	59.42	Q
4	Gisele Cruz	Brazil	59.48	
5	Sandra Mazan	Poland	59.52	
6	Andreea Patrasc	Romania	60.94	
7	Kalyn Sheehan	Ireland	61.74	
8	Hsu Ju-Yin	Chinese Taipei	62.07	

==== Heat 3 ====
Rank	Name	Nationality	Time	Notes
1	Nicole Leach	United States	57.27	Q
2	Frederike Schönfeld	Germany	58.60	Q
3	Darya Korableva	Russia	58.88	Q
4	Sara Petersen	Denmark	58.89	q
5	Chen Yumei	China	59.58	
6	Sarah Wells	Canada	60.62	
7	Zoe Anello	Italy	61.06	

==== Heat 4 ====
Rank	Name	Nationality	Time	Notes
1	Ajoke Odumusu	Nigeria	57.11	Q
2	Ebony Collins	United States	57.35	Q
3	Muna Jabir Adam	Sudan	57.55	Q
4	Laetitia Denis	France	58.48	q
5	Tina Polak	Poland	59.14	q
6	Julia Müller-Foell	Germany	61.30	
7	Ellen Howarth-Brown	United Kingdom	61.49	
8	Hayat Lambarki	Morocco	63.54	

== Participation ==
According to an unofficial count, 30 athletes from 21 countries participated in the event.

- Australia (1)
- Brazil (1)
- Canada (2)
- China (2)
- Chinese Taipei (1)
- Denmark (1)
- France (2)
- Germany (2)
- Ireland (1)
- Italy (1)
- Jamaica (2)
- Japan (1)
- Morocco (1)
- Nigeria (1)
- Poland (2)
- Romania (1)
- Russia (2)
- Sudan (1)
- Syria (1)
- United Kingdom (2)
- United States (2)
