= 2004 World Junior Championships in Athletics – Women's 4 × 400 metres relay =

The women's 4x400 metres relay event at the 2004 World Junior Championships in Athletics was held in Grosseto, Italy, at Stadio Olimpico Carlo Zecchini on 17 and 18 July.

== Medalists ==
Gold	Alexandria Anderson; Ashlee Kidd; Stephanie Smith; Natasha Hastings; United States
Silver	Viktoriya Talko; Mariya Shapayeva; Olga Soldatova; Yekaterina Kostetskaya; Russia
Bronze	Nyoka Cole; Maris Wisdom; Sherene Pinnock; Sonita Sutherland; Jamaica

== Results ==
=== Final ===
18 July

Rank	Nation	Competitors	Time	Notes
1st place, gold medalist(s)	United States	Alexandria Anderson; Ashlee Kidd; Stephanie Smith; Natasha Hastings	3:27.60	
2nd place, silver medalist(s)	Russia	Viktoriya Talko; Mariya Shapayeva; Olga Soldatova; Yekaterina Kostetskaya	3:30.03	
3rd place, bronze medalist(s)	Jamaica	Nyoka Cole; Maris Wisdom; Sherene Pinnock; Sonita Sutherland	3:30.37	
4	Germany	Sorina Nwachikukwa; Anja Pollmächer; Sara Battke; Diana Dienel	3:33.51	
5	United Kingdom	Faye Harding; Gemma Nicol; Charlotte Best; Laura Finucane	3:33.67	
6	France	Rose Ndje; Thélia Sigère; Marie-Noëlle Gaudin; Symphora Béhi	3:33.88	
7	Romania	Ioana Ciurila; Gabriela Ciuca; Simona Barcau; Angela Moroșanu	3:35.51	
8	China	Wu Shanshan; He Yu; Wang Wenshan; Tang Xiaoyin	3:38.57	

=== Heats ===
17 July

==== Heat 1 ====
Rank	Nation	Competitors	Time	Notes
1	United States	Nicole Leach; Alexandria Anderson; Deonna Lawrence; Stephanie Smith	3:30.13	Q
2	Germany	Sorina Nwachikukwa; Sara Battke; Lena Lang; Anja Pollmächer	3:36.90	Q
3	China	Wu Shanshan; He Yu; Wang Wenshan; Tang Xiaoyin	3:37.13	Q
4	Romania	Gabriela Ciuca; Simona Barcau; Ioana Ciurila; Angela Moroșanu	3:37.30	q
5	Australia	Jacqueline Davies; Jaimee-Lee Hoebergen; Carly Feben; Zoe Buckman	3:39.53	
6	Italy	Marta Milani; Maria Spacca; Maeva Gotti; Valentina Russo	3:41.53	
	South Africa	Lizelle Pretorius; Angela Wagner; Tihanna Vorster; Amanda Kotze	DQ	IAAF rule 170.18
	Turkey	Özge Gürler; Aslı Çakır; Nevin Yanıt; Pınar Saka	DQ	IAAF rule 32.2

==== Heat 2 ====
Rank	Nation	Competitors	Time	Notes
1	Russia	Viktoriya Talko; Irina Obedina; Diana Potapova; Yekaterina Kostetskaya	3:32.93	Q
2	Jamaica	Nyoka Cole; Sherene Pinnock; Maris Wisdom; Anneisha McLaughlin	3:33.28	Q
3	France	Rose Ndje; Thélia Sigère; Marie-Noëlle Gaudin; Symphora Béhi	3:35.91	Q
4	United Kingdom	Faye Harding; Charlotte Best; Rachael Thompson; Gemma Nicol	3:36.40	q
5	Czech Republic	Michaela Rinková; Zuzana Hejnová; Jana Polívková; Jitka Bartoničková	3:37.89	
6	Netherlands	Sjorske Wijnker; Romara van Noort; Henrieke Krommendijk; Annemarie Schulte	3:40.74	
7	Senegal	Fatou Diabaye; Tante Seck Mbaye; Ndèye Maty Sall; Ndèye Fatou Soumah	3:48.49	

== Participation ==
According to an unofficial count, 67 athletes from 15 countries participated in the event.

- Australia (4)
- China (4)
- Czech Republic (4)
- France (4)
- Germany (5)
- Italy (4)
- Jamaica (5)
- Netherlands (4)
- Romania (4)
- Russia (6)
- Senegal (4)
- South Africa (4)
- Turkey (4)
- United Kingdom (5)
- United States (6)
