= 2007 European Athletics U23 Championships – Women's 400 metres hurdles =

The women's 400 metres hurdles event at the 2007 European Athletics U23 Championships was held in Debrecen, Hungary, at Gyulai István Atlétikai Stadion on 13 and 14 July.

== Medalists ==
Gold	Angela Moroșanu; Romania
Silver	Irina Obedina; Russia
Bronze	Zuzana Hejnová; Czech Republic

== Results ==
=== Final ===
14 July

Rank	Name	Nationality	Time	Notes
1st place, gold medalist(s)	Angela Moroșanu	Romania	54.50	CR
2nd place, silver medalist(s)	Irina Obedina	Russia	55.19	
3rd place, bronze medalist(s)	Zuzana Hejnová	Czech Republic	55.93	
4	Yuliya Mulyukova	Russia	56.71	
5	Eilidh Child	Great Britain	57.11	
6	Sara Petersen	Denmark	57.52	
7	Nikolina Horvat	Croatia	58.54	
	Dora Jémaa	France	DQ	IAAF Rule 168.7

=== Heats ===
13 July
Qualified: first 2 in each heat 2 best to the Final

==== Heat 1 ====
Rank	Name	Nationality	Time	Notes
1	Angela Moroșanu	Romania	56.55	Q
2	Yuliya Mulyukova	Russia	56.75	Q
3	Eilidh Child	Great Britain	57.73	q
4	Marine Drapier	France	59.01	
5	Rita Apollo	Italy	59.13	
6	Shawnee Johnson	Spain	60.81	
7	Christine Næsheim Bjørkvik	Norway	61.00	

==== Heat 2 ====
Rank	Name	Nationality	Time	Notes
1	Irina Obedina	Russia	57.36	Q
2	Sara Petersen	Denmark	57.56	Q
3	Özge Gürler	Turkey	58.18	
4	Laura Sotomayor	Spain	58.37	
5	Ana Berlinscaia	Moldova	59.25	
6	Emma Björkman	Sweden	59.69	
7	Zsófia Pölöskei	Hungary	60.56	

==== Heat 3 ====
Rank	Name	Nationality	Time	Notes
1	Zuzana Hejnová	Czech Republic	57.41	Q
2	Dora Jémaa	France	57.69	Q
3	Nikolina Horvat	Croatia	57.91	q
4	Svetlana Gogoleva	Russia	59.08	
5	Elisa Scardanzan	Italy	59.56	
6	Olga Ortega	Spain	60.05	
7	Liat Anav	Israel	61.94	

== Participation ==
According to an unofficial count, 21 athletes from 15 countries participated in the event.

- Croatia (1)
- Czech Republic (1)
- Denmark (1)
- France (2)
- Great Britain (1)
- Hungary (1)
- Israel (1)
- Italy (2)
- Moldova (1)
- Norway (1)
- Romania (1)
- Russia (3)
- Spain (3)
- Sweden (1)
- Turkey (1)
