= 2004 World Junior Championships in Athletics – Women's 400 metres hurdles =

The women's 400 metres hurdles event at the 2004 World Junior Championships in Athletics was held in Grosseto, Italy, at Stadio Olimpico Carlo Zecchini on 14 and 15 July.

== Medalists ==
Gold	Yekaterina Kostetskaya; Russia
Silver	Zuzana Hejnová; Czech Republic
Bronze	Sherene Pinnock; Jamaica

== Results ==
=== Final ===
15 July

Rank	Name	Nationality	Time	Notes
1st place, gold medalist(s)	Yekaterina Kostetskaya	Russia	55.55	
2nd place, silver medalist(s)	Zuzana Hejnová	Czech Republic	57.44	
3rd place, bronze medalist(s)	Sherene Pinnock	Jamaica	57.54	
4	Nicole Leach	United States	57.56	
5	He Yu	China	58.11	
6	Tatyana Azarova	Kazakhstan	58.41	
7	Irina Obedina	Russia	58.63	
8	Angela Moroșanu	Romania	63.10	

=== Heats ===
14 July

==== Heat 1 ====
Rank	Name	Nationality	Time	Notes
1	Yekaterina Kostetskaya	Russia	56.84	Q
2	Sherene Pinnock	Jamaica	58.58	Q
3	Miki Sawada	Japan	59.23	
4	Heike Wissing	Germany	60.20	
5	Christina Smith	United States	60.42	
6	Elisa Scardanzan	Italy	61.52	
7	Sareteka Mbango	Togo	66.07	

==== Heat 2 ====
Rank	Name	Nationality	Time	Notes
1	Nicole Leach	United States	57.98	Q
2	Tatyana Azarova	Kazakhstan	58.36	Q
3	Irina Obedina	Russia	58.96	q
4	Eva-Maria Erwes	Germany	60.65	
5	Olga Ortega	Spain	60.92	
6	Nikolina Horvat	Croatia	61.14	
7	Jessica Miller	Uruguay	61.74	

==== Heat 3 ====
Rank	Name	Nationality	Time	Notes
1	He Yu	China	58.12	Q
2	Angela Moroșanu	Romania	58.30	Q
3	Zuzana Hejnová	Czech Republic	59.08	q
4	Doura Jémaa	France	59.82	
5	Faye Harding	United Kingdom	60.31	
6	Sara Petersen	Denmark	60.60	
7	Anastasiya Proshkina	Uzbekistan	64.33	
8	Trishana McGowan	Jamaica	66.65	

== Participation ==
According to an unofficial count, 22 athletes from 18 countries participated in the event.

- China (1)
- Croatia (1)
- Czech Republic (1)
- Denmark (1)
- France (1)
- Germany (2)
- Italy (1)
- Jamaica (2)
- Japan (1)
- Kazakhstan (1)
- Romania (1)
- Russia (2)
- Spain (1)
- Togo (1)
- United Kingdom (1)
- United States (2)
- Uruguay (1)
- Uzbekistan (1)
