= 2013 European Athletics Indoor Championships – Women's 400 metres =

Women's 400 metres at the 2013 European Athletics Indoor Championships
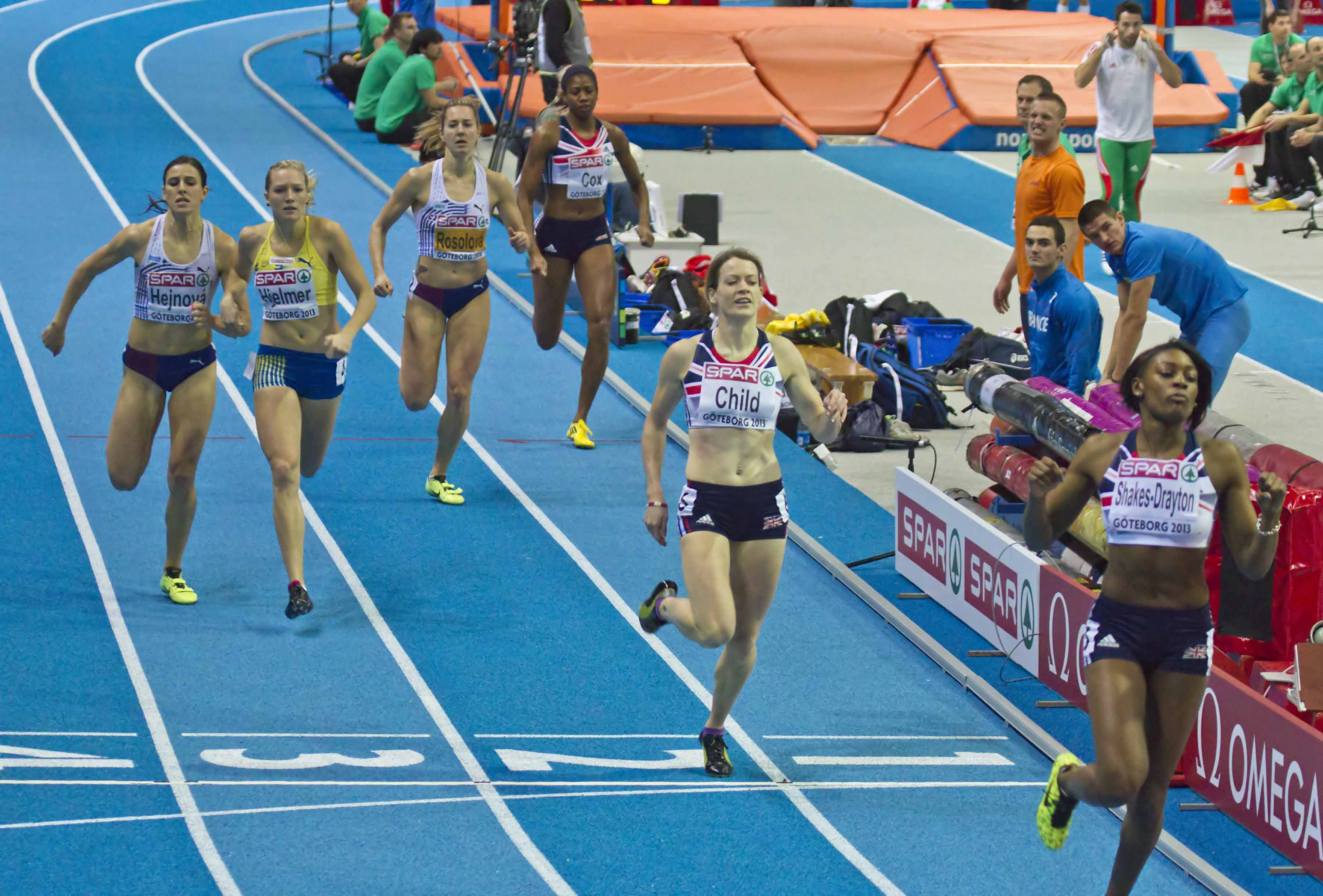
- Medalists Perri Shakes-Drayton, Eilidh Child, and Moa Hjelmer and the other runners at the finish of the final
- Venue: Scandinavium
- Location: Gothenburg, Sweden
- Dates: 1 March 2013 (round 1); 2 March 2013 (semi-finals); 3 March 2013 (final)
- Competitors: 20 from 15 nations
- Winning time: 50.85 s

Medalists
| gold medal | Perri Shakes-Drayton | Great Britain |
| silver medal | Eilidh Child | Great Britain |
| bronze medal | Moa Hjelmer | Sweden |

The women's 400 metres event at the 2013 European Athletics Indoor Championships was held on 1 March 2013 at 11:00 (round 1), 2 March 16:35 (semi-final), and 3 March 11:15 (final) local time.

== Background ==
Records before the 2013 European Athletics Indoor Championships
| Record | Athlete (nation) | Time | Location | Date |
|---|---|---|---|---|
| World record | Jarmila Kratochvílová (TCH) | 49.59 | Milan, Italy | 7 March 1982 |
| European record | Jarmila Kratochvílová (TCH) | 49.59 | Milan, Italy | 7 March 1982 |
| Championship record | Jarmila Kratochvílová (TCH) | 49.59 | Milan, Italy | 7 March 1982 |
| World Leading | Natasha Hastings (USA) | 50.88 | Birmingham, United Kingdom | 16 February 2013 |
| European Leading | Kseniya Ustalova (RUS) | 51.31 | Moscow, Russia | 13 February 2013 |

== Results ==
=== Round 1 ===
Qualification: First 2 (Q) and the 4 fastest athletes (q) advanced to the semifinals.

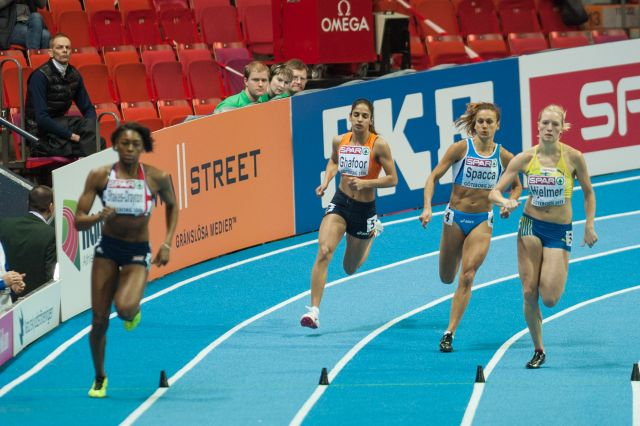
Heat 1 underway

Results of round 1
| Rank | Heat | Lane | Athlete | Nation | Time | Note |
|---|---|---|---|---|---|---|
| 1 | 1 | 6 | Perri Shakes-Drayton | Great Britain | 51.70 | Q |
| 2 | 3 | 6 | Eilidh Child | Great Britain | 52.05 | Q |
| 3 | 2 | 6 | Angela Moroșanu | Romania | 52.07 | Q, SB |
| 4 | 3 | 5 | Denisa Rosolová | Czech Republic | 52.20 | Q |
| 5 | 2 | 5 | Kseniya Ustalova | Russia | 52.23 | Q |
| 6 | 3 | 4 | Ella Räsänen | Finland | 52.37 | q, NR, AJR |
| 7 | 1 | 3 | Moa Hjelmer | Sweden | 52.87 | Q, SB |
| 8 | 1 | 5 | Madiea Ghafoor | Netherlands | 52.88 | q |
| 9 | 2 | 3 | Shana Cox | Great Britain | 52.99 | q |
| 10 | 3 | 3 | Line Kloster | Norway | 53.15 | q, NR |
| 11 | 4 | 6 | Zuzana Hejnová | Czech Republic | 53.20 | Q |
| 12 | 2 | 4 | Olha Zemlyak | Ukraine | 53.26 | SB |
| 13 | 4 | 5 | Marie Gayot | France | 53.49 | Q |
| 14 | 4 | 4 | Aauri Lorena Bokesa | Spain | 53.61 | |
| 15 | 1 | 4 | Maria Enrica Spacca | Italy | 53.79 | |
| 16 | 4 | 3 | Alina Andreea Panainte | Romania | 53.98 | |
| 17 | 1 | 2 | Léa Sprunger | Switzerland | 54.45 | |
| 18 | 2 | 2 | Chiara Bazzoni | Italy | 54.55 | |
| 19 | 3 | 2 | Anita Banović | Croatia | 55.00 | |
| 20 | 4 | 2 | Amaliya Sharoyan | Armenia | 56.35 | |

=== Semifinals ===
Qualification: First 3 (Q) advanced to the final.

Results of the semi-finals
| Rank | Heat | Athlete | Nation | Time | Note |
|---|---|---|---|---|---|
| 1 | 2 | Perri Shakes-Drayton | Great Britain | 51.03 | Q, EL |
| 2 | 2 | Zuzana Hejnová | Czech Republic | 51.27 | Q, PB |
| 3 | 2 | Denisa Rosolová | Czech Republic | 52.12 | Q, SB |
| 4 | 1 | Eilidh Child | Great Britain | 52.29 | Q |
| 5 | 1 | Moa Hjelmer | Sweden | 52.38 | Q, SB |
| 6 | 2 | Line Kloster | Norway | 52.78 | NR |
| 7 | 2 | Ella Räsänen | Finland | 52.84 | |
| 8 | 1 | Shana Cox | Great Britain | 52.86 | Q, SB |
| 9 | 1 | Madiea Ghafoor | Netherlands | 53.12 | |
| 10 | 2 | Marie Gayot | France | 53.38 | |
| | 1 | Angela Moroșanu | Romania | DQ | R 163.2 |
| | 1 | Kseniya Ustalova | Russia | DNF | |

=== Final ===
The final was held at 11:15.

Results of the final
| Rank | Athlete | Nation | Time | Note |
|---|---|---|---|---|
| 1st place, gold medalist(s) | Perri Shakes-Drayton | Great Britain | 50.85 | WL |
| 2nd place, silver medalist(s) | Eilidh Child | Great Britain | 51.45 | PB |
| 3rd place, bronze medalist(s) | Moa Hjelmer | Sweden | 52.04 | NR |
| 4 | Zuzana Hejnová | Czech Republic | 52.12 | |
| 5 | Denisa Rosolová | Czech Republic | 52.71 | |
| 6 | Shana Cox | Great Britain | 53.15 | |
