= 2009 World Championships in Athletics – Women's 400 metres hurdles =

Women's 400 metres hurdles at the 2009 World Championships in Athletics
- Venue: Olympic Stadium
- Location: Berlin, Germany
- Dates: 17 August 2009 (heats); 18 August 2009 (semifinals); 20 August 2009 (final)
- Winning time: 52.42 s CR AR

Medalists
gold medal	Melaine Walker	Jamaica
silver medal	Lashinda Demus	United States
bronze medal	Josanne Lucas	Trinidad and Tobago

The women's 400 metres hurdles at the 2009 World Championships in Athletics was held at the Olympic Stadium on 17, 18 and 20 August.

In the four major championships between 2004 and 2008, the twelve available medals were won by eleven different athletes. Yuliya Pechonkina was the only athlete to reach the podium twice in that period, having won the 2005 World Championships and won the silver at the same event two years later. With such a quick turnover, it was expected that new athletes would again be possible medallists, especially as Pechonkina and reigning champion Jana Pittman-Rawlinson had withdrawn prior to the competition. However, 2005 medallist Lashinda Demus appeared to be a likely contender, having set the world-leading time of 52.63 seconds a month before the competition (significantly faster than any other athlete at that point in the season). Angela Moroșanu, Josanne Lucas were amongst the season's fastest hurdlers, but the gold and silver medallists from the Beijing Olympics, Melaine Walker and Sheena Tosta had not shown strong form.

Demus and Moroşanu recorded the fastest times on the first day of the competition, which saw no surprise eliminations. Kaliese Spencer was the third fastest, making her seem a possible finalist. Reigning Olympic champion Walker was the fastest in the semi-finals, with Lucas the second fastest in a national record time. Spencer, winner of the second race, was initially disqualified but was reinstated upon review. Amaka Ogoegbunam, a Nigerian athlete, tested positive for metenolone (an anabolic steroid) after the semi-finals, becoming the second athlete of the competition to fail a drugs test after Jamel Chatbi.

In the final race, Demus and Walker started fastest, with Lucas and Spencer not far behind. Demus took the lead near the final stretch but took the last two hurdles badly, allowing Walker to pass her to take the gold medal. Walker's time of 52.42 s was a Championship record and North American record, and only 0.08 seconds away from Pechonkina's world record. Bronze medallist Lucas had improved her national record by a significant amount (0.78 seconds) and fourth placed Spencer had set a new personal best.

Walker had won despite modest performances in the season prior to the competition, while Demus failed to match her world-leading time she had set at the Herculis meeting in Monaco. Walker's run, which capped an Olympic and World double, was the second fastest in the history of the event. Josanne Lucas had significantly improved over the course of a year, knocking two seconds off her personal best, demonstrating her potential as a future medallist.

== Medalists ==
Gold	Silver	Bronze
Melaine Walker; Jamaica	Lashinda Demus; United States	Josanne Lucas; Trinidad and Tobago

== Records before the Championships ==
World record	Yuliya Pechonkina (RUS)	52.34	Tula, Russia	8 August 2003
Championship record	Kim Batten (USA)	52.61	Gothenburg, Sweden	11 August 1995
World leading	Lashinda Demus (USA)	52.63	Monaco	28 July 2009
African record	Nezha Bidouane (MAR)	52.90	Sevilla, Spain	25 August 1999
Asian record	Han Qing (CHN)	53.96	Beijing, China	9 September 1993
North American record	Kim Batten (USA)	52.61	Gothenburg, Sweden	11 August 1995
South American record	Lucimar Teodoro (BRA)	55.84	Belém, Brazil	24 May 2009
European record	Yuliya Pechonkina (RUS)	52.34	Tula, Russia	8 August 2003
Oceanian record	Debbie Flintoff-King (AUS)	53.17	Seoul, South Korea	28 September 1988

== Qualification standards ==
A time	B time
55.50	56.55

== Schedule ==
Date	Time	Round
August 17, 2009	18:15	Heats
August 18, 2009	20:15	Semifinals
August 20, 2009	20:15	Final

== Results ==
=== Heats ===
Qualification: First 4 in each heat(Q) and the next 4 fastest(q) advance to the semifinals.

Rank	Heat	Name	Nationality	Time	Notes
1	5	Lashinda Demus	United States	54.66	Q
2	4	Angela Moroșanu	Romania	54.70	Q
3	1	Kaliese Spencer	Jamaica	55.12	Q
4	3	Melaine Walker	Jamaica	55.17	Q
5	4	Tiffany Ross-Williams	United States	55.25	Q
6	2	Nickiesha Wilson	Jamaica	55.37	Q
7	3	Natalya Antyukh	Russia	55.40	Q
8	1	Josanne Lucas	Trinidad and Tobago	55.41	Q
9	1	Huang Xiaoxiao	China	55.52	Q, SB
10	2	Anna Jesień	Poland	55.57	Q
11	5	Anastasiya Rabchenyuk	Ukraine	55.63	Q
12	4	Zuzana Hejnová	Czech Republic	55.68	Q
13	2	Eilidh Child	Great Britain & N.I.	55.96	Q
14	2	Sheena Tosta	United States	56.00	Q
15	1	Vania Stambolova	Bulgaria	56.01	Q
16	2	Ieva Zunda	Latvia	56.05	q, SB
17	5	Natalya Ivanova	Russia	56.11	Q
18	4	Elena Churakova	Russia	56.13	q
19	3	Perri Shakes-Drayton	Great Britain & N.I.	56.49	Q
20	3	Sara Petersen	Denmark	56.51	Q
21	4	Élodie Ouédraogo	Belgium	56.60	q, SB
22	5	Muizat Ajoke Odumosu	Nigeria	56.62	Q
23	5	Jonna Tilgner	Germany	56.73	q
24	1	Satomi Kubokura	Japan	56.91	
25	3	Michelle Carey	Ireland	56.91	
26	2	Aurore Kassambara	France	57.25	
27	3	Kou Luogon	Liberia	57.70	
28	1	Tatyana Azarova	Kazakhstan	57.90	
29	5	Carole Kaboud Mebam	Cameroon	58.10	
30	1	Hanna Titimets	Ukraine	58.22	
31	3	Laia Forcadell	Spain	58.57	
32	4	Yolanda Osana	Dominican Republic	59.18	
33	4	Aïssata Soulama	Burkina Faso	59.20	SB
34	1	Déborah Rodríguez	Uruguay	59.21	NR
35	3	Merjen Ishangulyyeva	Turkmenistan	1:00.75	
36	2	Sayaka Aoki	Japan	1:03.56	
	2	Tsvetelina Kirilova	Bulgaria	DQ	
	4	Amaka Ogoegbunam	Nigeria	DQ	
	5	Muna Jabir Adam	Sudan	DNS	

=== Semifinals ===
Qualification: First 2 in each semifinal (Q) and the next 2 fastest(q) advance to the final.

Rank	Heat	Name	Nationality	Time	Notes
1	1	Melaine Walker	Jamaica	53.26	Q, SB
2	1	Josanne Lucas	Trinidad and Tobago	53.98	Q, NR
3	1	Angela Moroșanu	Romania	54.15	q
4	3	Lashinda Demus	United States	54.25	Q
5	2	Kaliese Spencer	Jamaica	54.37	Q
6	2	Anastasiya Rabchenyuk	Ukraine	54.49	Q, SB
7	2	Tiffany Ross-Williams	United States	54.79	q
8	2	Anna Jesień	Poland	54.82	
9	3	Natalya Antyukh	Russia	54.86	Q
10	3	Nickiesha Wilson	Jamaica	54.89	SB
11	3	Zuzana Hejnová	Czech Republic	54.99	
12	1	Huang Xiaoxiao	China	55.40	SB
13	1	Natalya Ivanova	Russia	56.08	
14	2	Elena Churakova	Russia	56.11	
15	3	Vania Stambolova	Bulgaria	56.12	
16	3	Eilidh Child	Great Britain & N.I.	56.21	
17	1	Sheena Tosta	United States	56.31	
18	2	Ieva Zunda	Latvia	56.66	
19	1	Muizat Ajoke Odumosu	Nigeria	56.80	
20	3	Sara Petersen	Denmark	56.99	
21	3	Jonna Tilgner	Germany	57.11	
22	2	Perri Shakes-Drayton	Great Britain & N.I.	57.57	
23	1	Élodie Ouédraogo	Belgium	57.58	
	2	Amaka Ogoegbunam	Nigeria	~~58.56~~	DQ

=== Final ===
Rank	Name	Nationality	Time	Notes
1st place, gold medalist(s)	Melaine Walker	Jamaica	52.42	CR, AR
2nd place, silver medalist(s)	Lashinda Demus	United States	52.96	
3rd place, bronze medalist(s)	Josanne Lucas	Trinidad and Tobago	53.20	NR
4	Kaliese Spencer	Jamaica	53.56	PB
5	Tiffany Ross-Williams	United States	53.83	SB
6	Natalya Antyukh	Russia	54.11	PB
7	Anastasiya Rabchenyuk	Ukraine	54.78	
8	Angela Moroșanu	Romania	55.04	
