= Zuzana Hejnová =

Czech athlete (born 1986)

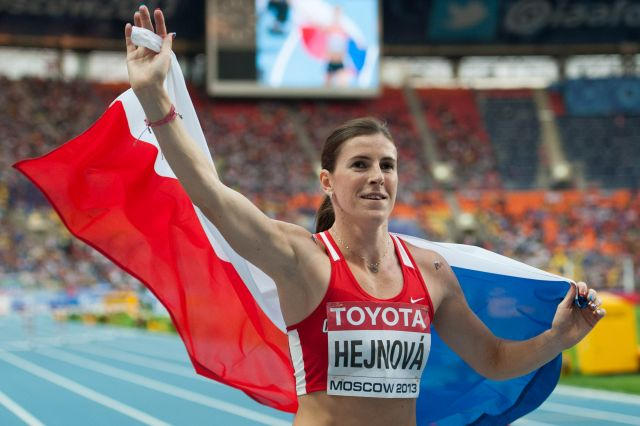
- Hejnová after her win at the 2013 World Championships in Athletics

Personal information
- Born: 19 December 1986 (age 39) Liberec, Czechoslovakia
- Height: 1.70 m (5 ft 7 in)
- Weight: 63 kg (139 lb)

Sport
- Country: Czech Republic
- Sport: Athletics
- Events: 400 m hurdles, 400 m, 100 m hurdles
- Retired: 2022

Achievements and titles
- Olympic finals: 2008 Beijing; 400 m hurdles, 7th; 2012 London; 400 m hurdles, Silver; 4 × 400 m relay, 6th; 2016 Rio de Janeiro; 400 m hurdles, 4th
- World finals: 2005 Helsinki; 400 m hurdles, 22nd (sf); 2007 Osaka; 400 m hurdles, 13th (sf); 2009 Berlin; 400 m hurdles, 11th (sf); 2011 Daegu; 400 m hurdles, 7th; 4 × 400 m relay, 5th; 2013 Moscow; 400 m hurdles, Gold; 2015 Beijing; 400 m hurdles, Gold; 2017 London; 400 m hurdles, 4th; 2019 Doha; 400 m hurdles, 5th
- Personal bests: 400 m hurdles: 52.83 NR (Moscow 2013); 400 m: 51.90 (Dublin 2013); 100 m hurdles: 13.36 (Prague 2011); Indoors; 400 m: 51.27 (Gothenburg 2013)
Medal record
Women's athletics
Representing Czech Republic
Olympic Games
Silver medal – second place	2012 London	400 m hurdles
World Championships
Gold medal – first place	2013 Moscow	400 m hurdles
Gold medal – first place	2015 Beijing	400 m hurdles
World Indoors Championships
Silver medal – second place	2010 Doha	4x400 m relay
Diamond League
First place	2013	400 m hurdles
First place	2015	400 m hurdles
European Championships
Bronze medal – third place	2012 Helsinki	400 m hurdles
Bronze medal – third place	2012 Helsinki	4 × 400 m relay
European Indoors Championships
Silver medal – second place	2017 Belgrade	400 m
Bronze medal – third place	2013 Gothenburg	4 × 400 m relay
European U23 Championships
Bronze medal – third place	2007 Debrecen	400 m hurdles
World U20 Championships
Silver medal – second place	2004 Grosseto	400 m hurdles
European U20 Championships
Gold medal – first place	2005 Kaunas	400 m hurdles
Bronze medal – third place	2003 Tampere	400 m hurdles
World Youth Championships
Gold medal – first place	2003 Sherbrooke	400 m hurdles

Zuzana Hejnová (Czech pronunciation: [ˈzuzana ˈɦɛjnovaː]; born 19 December 1986) is a Czech retired athlete who specialised in the 400 metres hurdles. She won the silver medal in the event at the 2012 London Olympics. Hejnová is a two-time World Champion, having claimed titles at the 2013 and 2015 World Championships in Athletics. She won bronze at the 2012 European Championships and silver for the 400 metres at the 2017 European Indoor Championships.

At age 16, Hejnová earned the gold medal in her specialist event at the 2003 World Under-18 Championships to take a silver at the 2004 World U20 Championships. She also won bronze and gold at the 2003 and 2005 European U20 Championships respectively. She is a two-time Diamond League 400 m hurdles winner. Hejnová is the Czech record holder for the 400 m hurdles, and also holds national best in the 300 m hurdles. She is a four-time Czech outdoor champion (400 m, 400 m hurdles) and an eight-time national indoor champion (200 m, 400 m, pentathlon).

Her sister, Michaela, is also an Olympic athlete.

== Junior ==
In 2003, Zuzana Hejnová competed at the 2003 World Youth Championships in Athletics at Sherbrooke, Canada and won the gold medal in the 400-metre hurdles with a time of 57.54. A year later, she returned at Grosseto, Italy at the 2004 World Junior Championships. This time she won the silver with a time of 57.44 in the 400 m hurdles, defeated by the Russian, Ekaterina Kostetskaya, who won gold by a large margin at 55.55 seconds.

Her current personal bests are 14.11 in the 100 m achieved at Ostrava on 3 September 2005; 13.77 in the 100 metres hurdles at Stará Boleslav on 13 June 2003; 53.04 in the 400 m at Kladno on 28 June 2008; and 54.90 in the 400 m hurdles recorded at Monaco on 28 July 2009.

== Career ==
=== 2008 ===
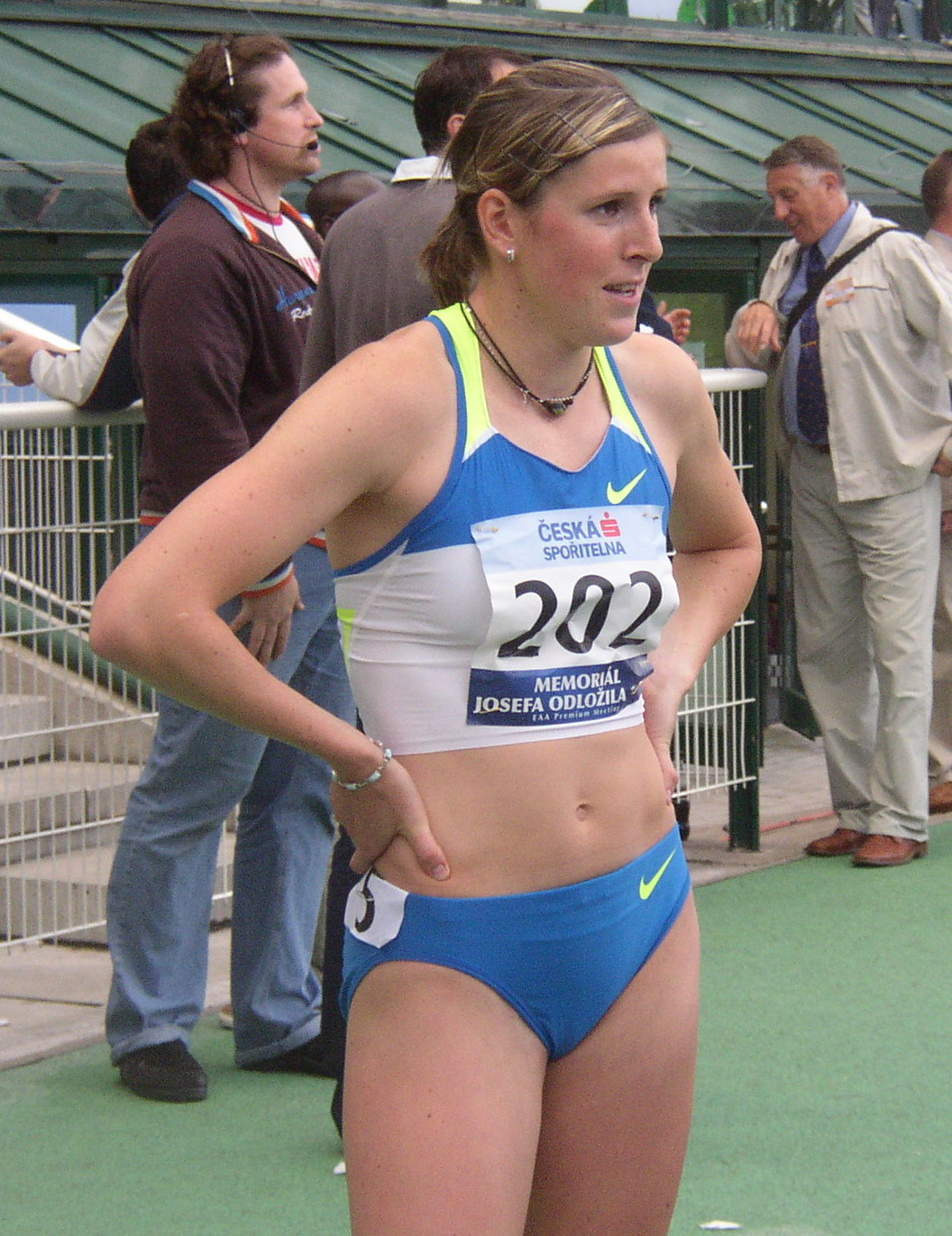
Hejnová at the Josef Odložil Memorial in Prague in 2008

In early March 2008 Hejnová competed in the 400 metres at the 2008 IAAF World Indoor Championships and reached the semi-finals but did not qualify to reach the final. She did however, reach the final with the Czech relay team in the 4 × 400 metres relay in a team which included her, Zuzana Bergrová, Denisa Ščerbová, and Jitka Bartoničková. They finished 4th, with a time of 3:34.53, but were over 5 seconds slower than the Americans who took bronze with a time of 3:29.30.

On 21 June 2008, she competed for the Czech Republic at the 2008 European Cup in Athletics.

Hejnová competed in the 400 metres hurdles at the 2008 Beijing Olympics. She qualified for the second round with the thirteenth fastest overall time of 55.91 seconds and for the final with 55.17. In the final she finished seventh with 54.97, only one hundredth behind her personal best at the time.

=== 2011 ===
She won the 400 metres hurdles at the European Team Championships with a new national record of 53.87 seconds. On 8 July 2011 she improved her national record to 53.29 seconds.

=== 2012 ===
At the 2012 London Olympics, Hejnová won originally the bronze medal for the women's 400 m hurdles, behind the winner, Russia's Natalya Antyukh, and Lashinda Demus of the United States.

In 2019, following a re-test of doping samples, Antyukh was disqualified with all her results 2013 onward deleted but her 2012 Olympic results were not affected. In October 2022, Antyukh's results from 15 July 2012 on were retroactively voided. In December, it was announced that she had been stripped of her title and Demus would be upgraded to gold in her place, with Hejnová then second.

=== 2013 ===
Hejnová won Diamond League races over 400 m Hurdles in Shanghai (53.79), Eugene (53.70), Oslo (53.60), Paris (53.23 NR), and London (53.07 NR). She also won races in Des Moines (54.41), Prague (54.55) and Ostrava (53.32). She secured maximum points for Czech Republic in the European Team Championships First League in Dublin by winning the 400 m in 51.90 seconds. On 15 August 2013 in Moscow, Hejnová became World Champion over 400 m hurdles with a new Czech record (52.83 NR).

=== 2016 ===
Despite winning her semi-final, Hejnová came fourth in the 400-metre hurdles at the 2016 Olympic Games in Rio de Janeiro.

She threatened to sue Czech Post for 1 million koruna over the use of her likeness on a stamp celebrating the 2016 Olympic Games. The Court of Appeal found in favour of Hejnová, leading to Czech Post paying her an undisclosed settlement.

After the Olympic Games, Hejnová switched to the German coach Falk Balzer.

=== 2017 ===
In 2017, Hejnová won the silver medal in the 400 meters at the European Indoor Championships in Belgrade with a time of 52.42 seconds, finishing second behind the French athlete Floria Gueï. After the 2017 indoor season, Balzer ended their collaboration and she switched to Dana Jandová.

== Achievements ==
All information from World Athletics profile.

=== International competitions ===
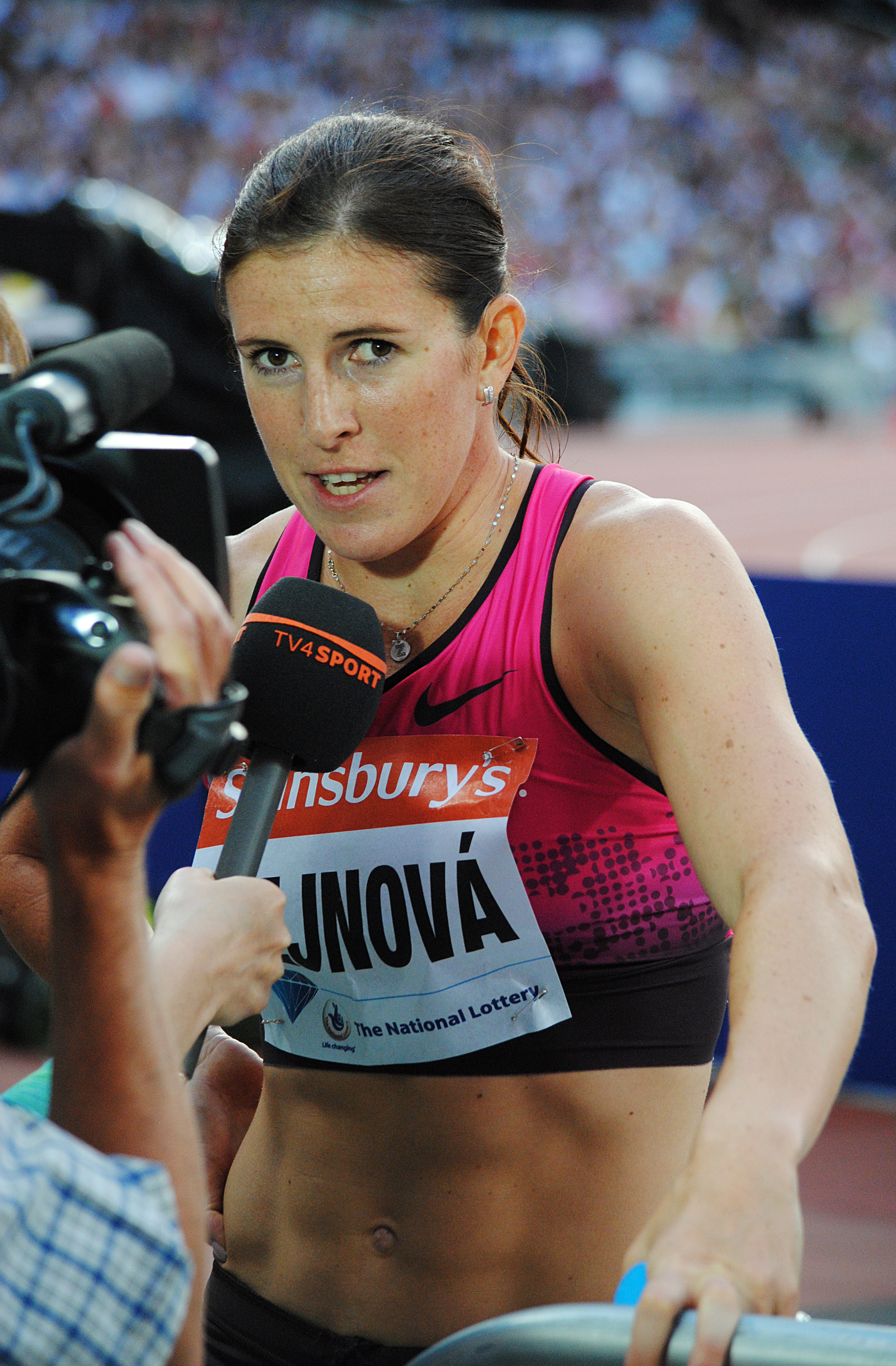
Hejnová at the Anniversary Games meet in London in 2013

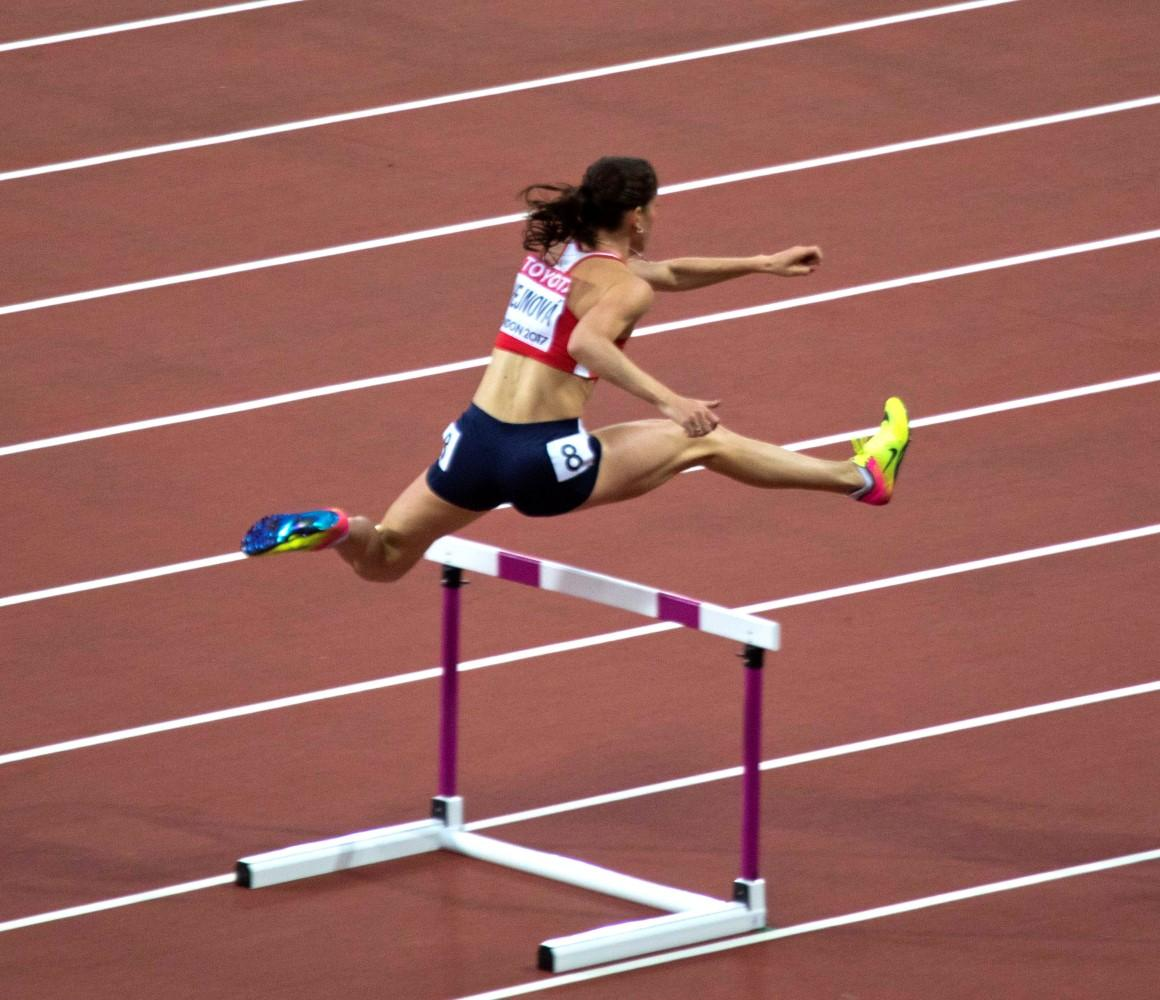
Hejnová races 400 m hurdles at the 2017 World Championships in Athletics in London

Representing Czech Republic
Year	Competition	Venue	Position	Event	Result
2002	World Junior Championships	Kingston, Jamaica	5th	400 m hurdles	58.42
2003	World Youth Championships	Sherbrooke, Canada	1st	400 m hurdles	57.54
2003	European Junior Championships	Tampere, Finland	3rd	400 m hurdles	58.30
2003	European Junior Championships	Tampere, Finland	8th	4 × 400 m relay	3:44.55
2004	World Junior Championships	Grosseto, Italy	2nd	400 m hurdles	57.44
2004	World Junior Championships	Grosseto, Italy	9th (h)	4 × 400 m relay	3:37.89
2005	European Junior Championships	Kaunas, Lithuania	1st	400 m hurdles	55.89
2005	European Junior Championships	Kaunas, Lithuania	–	4 × 400 m relay	DNF
2005	World Championships	Helsinki, Finland	22nd (sf)	400 m hurdles	57.29
2006	European Championships	Gothenburg, Sweden	13th (sf)	400 m hurdles	56.39
2006	European Championships	Gothenburg, Sweden	10th (h)	4 × 400 m relay	3:34.47
2007	European U23 Championships	Debrecen, Hungary	3rd	400 m hurdles	55.93
2007	World Championships	Osaka, Japan	13th (sf)	400 m hurdles	55.04
2008	World Indoor Championships	Valencia, Spain	7th	400 m	53.16
2008	World Indoor Championships	Valencia, Spain	4th	4 × 400 m relay	3:34.53
2008	Olympic Games	Beijing, China	7th	400 m hurdles	54.97
2009	World Championships	Berlin, Germany	11th (sf)	400 m hurdles	54.99
2010	World Indoor Championships	Doha, Qatar	12th (h)	400 m	53.56
2010	World Indoor Championships	Doha, Qatar	2nd	4 × 400 m relay	3:30.05
2010	European Championships	Barcelona, Spain	4th	400 m hurdles	54.30
2012	European Championships	Helsinki, Finland	3rd	400 m hurdles	54.49
2012	European Championships	Helsinki, Finland	3rd	4 × 400 m relay	3:26.02
2012	Olympic Games	London, United Kingdom	2nd	400 m hurdles	53.38
2012	Olympic Games	London, United Kingdom	6th	4 × 400 m relay	3:27.77
2013	European Indoor Championships	Gothenburg, Sweden	4th	400 m	52.12
2013	European Indoor Championships	Gothenburg, Sweden	3rd	4 × 400 m relay	3:28.49
2013	World Championships	Moscow, Russia	1st	400 m hurdles	52.83
2013	World Championships	Moscow, Russia	11th (h)	4 × 400 m relay	3:30.48
2015	European Indoor Championships	Prague, Czech Republic	15th (h)	800 m	2:05.34
2015	European Indoor Championships	Prague, Czech Republic	4th	4 × 400 m relay	3:32.08
2015	World Championships	Beijing, China	1st	400 m hurdles	53.50
2016	Olympic Games	Rio de Janeiro, Brazil	4th	400 m hurdles	53.92
2017	European Indoor Championships	Belgrade, Serbia	2nd	400 m	52.42
2017	World Championships	London, United Kingdom	4th	400 m hurdles	54.20
2018	European Championships	Berlin, Germany	13th (sf)	400 m hurdles	56.03
2019	World Championships	Doha, Qatar	5th	400 m hurdles	54.23

=== Circuit wins and titles ===
- Diamond League overall winner 400 m hurdles (2): 2013, 2015

400 metres hurdles wins, other events specified in parentheses

- 2011 (2): Oslo Bislett Games, Paris Meeting (WL NR)
- 2012 (1): Monaco Herculis (SB)
- 2013 (7): Shanghai Golden Grand Prix (WL), Eugene Prefontaine Classic (WL), Oslo (SB), Paris (NR), London Anniversary Games (WL NR), Stockholm DN Galan (MR), Zürich Weltklasse
- 2015 (4): Paris, London, Stockholm, Zürich
- 2017 (3): Rabat Meeting International (SB), Birmingham Grand Prix (SB), Zürich (SB)

=== National titles ===
- Czech Athletics Championships
  - 400 metres: 2006, 2009
  - 400 m hurdles: 2018, 2020
- Czech Indoor Athletics Championships
  - 200 metres: 2011
  - 400 metres: 2005, 2007, 2008, 2009, 2015, 2016
  - Pentathlon: 2007

Awards
Preceded by (Russia) Mariya Savinova	Women's European Athlete of the Year; 2013	Succeeded by (Netherlands) Dafne Schippers
Preceded by Barbora Špotáková; Petra Kvitová	Czech Athlete of the Year; 2013; 2015	Succeeded by Petra Kvitová; Lukáš Krpálek
