= 2017 European Athletics Indoor Championships – Women's 400 metres =

Women's 400 metres at the 2017 European Athletics Indoor Championships
- Venue: Kombank Arena
- Location: Belgrade, Serbia
- Dates: 3 March 2017 (heats and semi-finals); 4 March 2017 (final)
- Competitors: 31 from 18 nations
- Winning time: 51.90 s

Medalists
gold medal	Floria Gueï	France
silver medal	Zuzana Hejnová	Czech Republic
bronze medal	Justyna Święty	Poland

The women's 400 metres event at the 2017 European Athletics Indoor Championships was held on 3 March 2017 at 9:45 (heats), at 17:45 (semifinals) and on 4 March 19:58 (final) local time.

== Records ==
Standing records prior to the 2017 European Athletics Indoor Championships
World record	Jarmila Kratochvílová (TCH)	49.59	Milan, Italy	7 March 1982
European record	Jarmila Kratochvílová (TCH)	49.59	Milan, Italy	7 March 1982
Championship record	Jarmila Kratochvílová (TCH)	49.59	Milan, Italy	7 March 1982
World Leading	Léa Sprunger (SUI)	51.46	Magglingen, Switzerland	5 February 2017
European Leading	Léa Sprunger (SUI)	51.46	Magglingen, Switzerland	5 February 2017

== Results ==
=== Heats ===
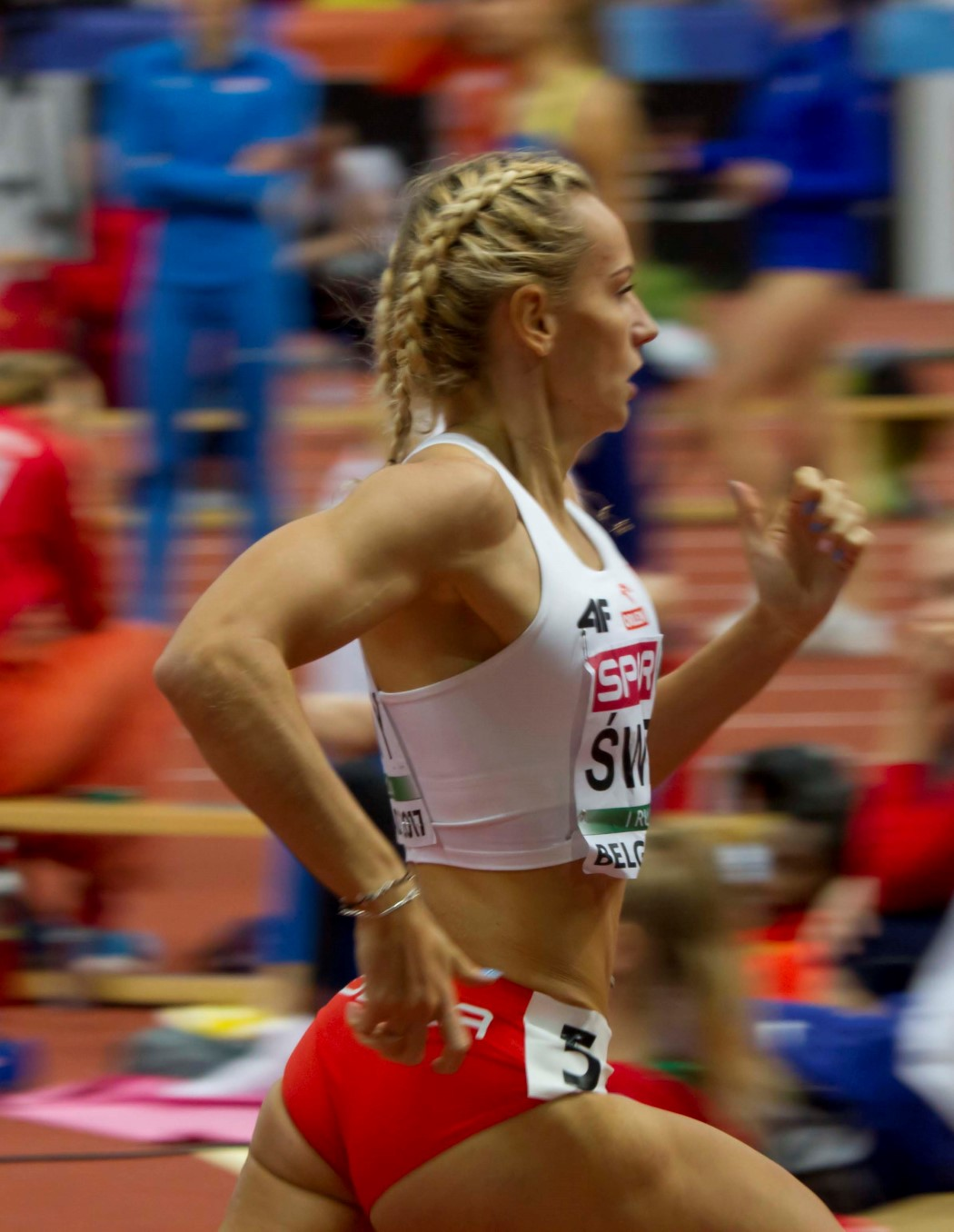
Justyna Święty during the sixth heat

Qualification: First 2 in each heat (Q) and the next 6 fastest (q) advance to the Semifinal.

Rank	Heat	Athlete	Nationality	Time	Note
1	1	Léa Sprunger	Switzerland	52.55	Q
2	5	Floria Gueï	France	53.24	Q
3	2	Zuzana Hejnová	Czech Republic	53.26	Q
4	3	Eilidh Doyle	Great Britain	53.28	Q
5	5	Sara Petersen	Denmark	53.39	Q
6	1	Iveta Putalová	Slovakia	53.52	Q
6	1	Iga Baumgart	Poland	53.52	Q
8	3	Małgorzata Hołub	Poland	53.56	Q
9	2	Lisanne de Witte	Netherlands	53.61	Q
10	2	Lara Hoffmann	Germany	53.65	q
11	4	Laviai Nielsen	Great Britain	53.74	Q
12	6	Justyna Święty	Poland	53.76	Q
13	6	Olha Bibik	Ukraine	53.80	Q
14	6	Madiea Ghafoor	Netherlands	53.85	q
15	3	Agnès Raharolahy	France	53.88	q
16	3	Aauri Lorena Bokesa	Spain	53.92	q
17	4	Déborah Sananes	France	53.98	Q
18	4	Tamara Salaški	Serbia	54.03	q
19	3	Bianca Răzor	Romania	54.11	
20	1	Sinéad Denny	Ireland	54.20	
21	6	Sarah Atcho	Switzerland	54.21	
21	4	Laura Bueno	Spain	54.21	
23	6	Eleni Artymata	Cyprus	54.31	
24	2	Anita Horvat	Slovenia	54.65	
25	5	Yasmin Giger	Switzerland	54.76	
26	5	Phil Healy	Ireland	54.80	
27	4	Eva Misiūnaitė	Lithuania	54.95	
28	2	Tetyana Melnyk	Ukraine	55.18	
29	1	Amaliya Sharoyan	Armenia	56.07	SB
	5	Denisa Rosolová	Czech Republic	DNF	
	1	Lina Nielsen	Great Britain	DNS	

=== Semifinals ===
Qualification: First 2 in each heat (Q) advance to the Final.

Rank	Heat	Athlete	Nationality	Time	Note
1	2	Léa Sprunger	Switzerland	52.17	Q
2	3	Floria Gueï	France	52.20	Q
3	3	Laviai Nielsen	Great Britain	52.31	Q
4	2	Justyna Święty	Poland	52.60	Q
5	1	Zuzana Hejnová	Czech Republic	52.74	Q
6	1	Małgorzata Hołub	Poland	52.76	Q
7	1	Eilidh Doyle	Great Britain	52.81	
8	2	Sara Petersen	Denmark	52.86	SB
9	1	Iveta Putalová	Slovakia	53.14	
10	3	Lara Hoffmann	Germany	53.43	
11	2	Tamara Salaški	Serbia	53.50	
12	1	Déborah Sananes	France	53.57	
13	2	Olha Bibik	Ukraine	53.66	
14	3	Iga Baumgart	Poland	53.76	
15	3	Aauri Lorena Bokesa	Spain	53.80	
16	3	Lisanne de Witte	Netherlands	54.81	
17	2	Déborah Sananes	France	55.30	
	1	Madiea Ghafoor	Netherlands	DNS	

=== Final ===
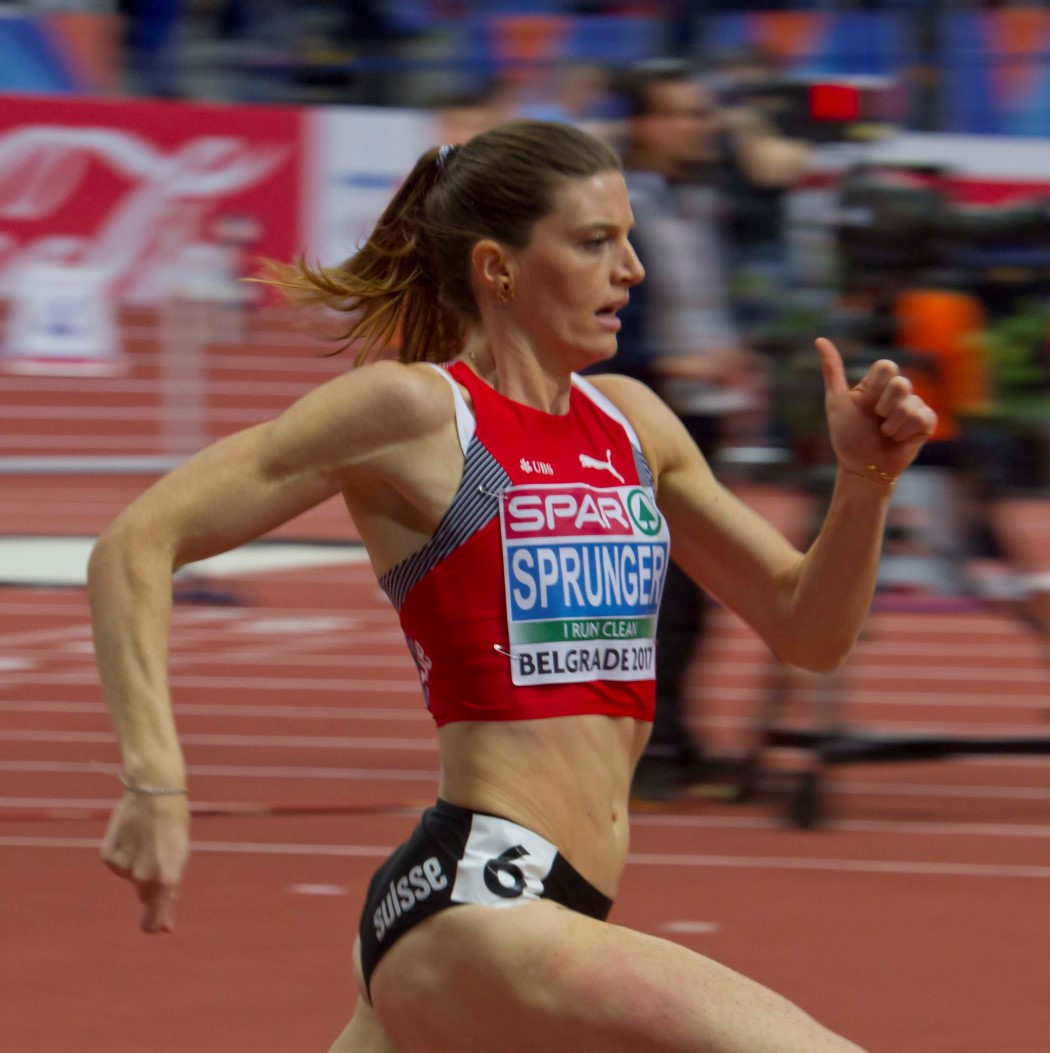
Léa Sprunger during the final

Rank	Lane	Athlete	Nationality	Time	Note
1st place, gold medalist(s)	5	Floria Gueï	France	51.90	PB
2nd place, silver medalist(s)	4	Zuzana Hejnová	Czech Republic	52.42	
3rd place, bronze medalist(s)	2	Justyna Święty	Poland	52.52	
4	3	Laviai Nielsen	Great Britain	52.79	
5	6	Léa Sprunger	Switzerland	53.08	
6	1	Małgorzata Hołub	Poland	54.29	
