= Angela Moroșanu =

Romanian athlete

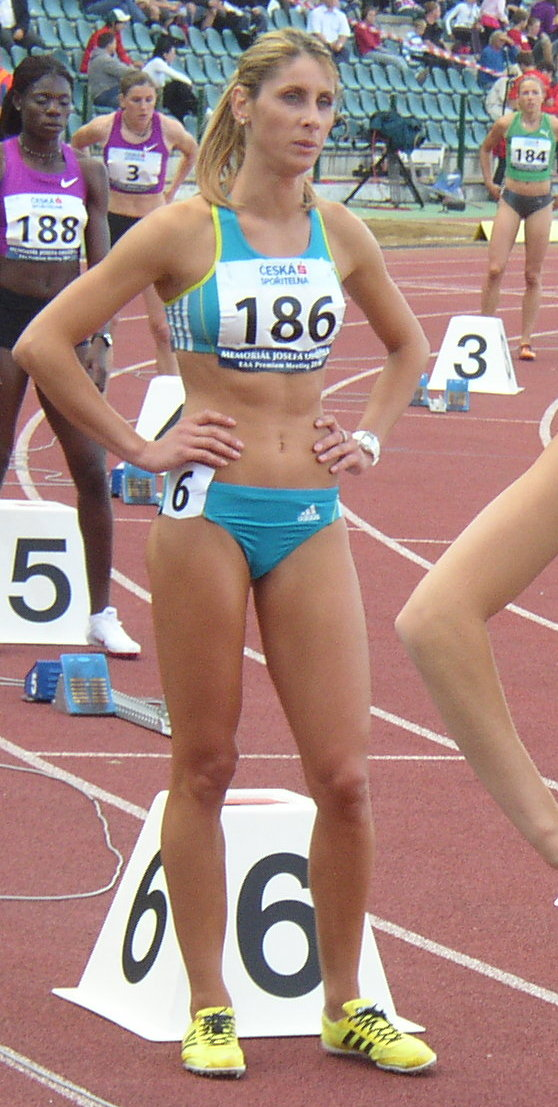
- Angela Moroșanu at the 2010 Josef Odložil Memorial in Prague

Personal information
- Born: 26 July 1986 (age 39) Iași, Romania
- Height: 1.81 m (5 ft 11 1/2 in)

Sport
- Country: Romania
- Sport: Athletics
- Events: 60, 100, 200 and 400 metres; 60 and 400 m hurdles; 4 × 400 m relay; long jump (only 2017–2019)
Medal record
World Indoor Championships
Bronze medal – third place	2004 Budapest	4x400 m relay
Bronze medal – third place	2012 Istanbul	4x400 m relay
European U23 Championships
Gold medal – first place	2007 Debrecen	400 m hurdles

Angela Moroșanu (born 26 July 1986) is a Romanian athlete who specialized in sprints up to 400 metres, the 400 metres hurdles and lastly the long jump. She was also an accomplished 4 × 400 metres relay runner, among others with two bronze medals from the World Indoor Championships. She competed at three Olympic Games, three World Championships and four European Championships. Regionally and domestically she won 16 Romanian championships, 13 Romanian indoor championships and several Balkan indoor and outdoor championships.

== Early life ==
Moroșanu was born in Iași. She ewas discovered by Albu Ştefan who became her first trainer whilst she was at school in Belcești, a village 40 km from Iaşi. She started out competing for sports clubs in Iaşi and Bacău. She later represented CS Dinamo București.

== Sprints and hurdles ==
At the age of 16 she finished sixth in the 4 × 400 metres relay at the 2002 World Junior Championships, setting a national U18 record of 3:39.95 minutes. At the 2003 World Youth Championships, the relay team was disqualified, whereas Morosanu reached the semi-final in the individual 200 metres – before taking silver at the 2003 European Youth Olympic Festival. She ended the season as Romanian champion in the 200 metres (plus a 400 bronze) and double Balkan junior champion in the 200 and 400 metres.

2004 saw Morosanu win the Romanian and Balkan Indoor Championships in the 200 metres, before winning a bronze medal in the 4 × 400 metres relay at the 2004 World Indoor Championships. Outdoors, she became Romanian 200 metres champion again (with another 400 metres silver), but internationally she took up the 400 metres hurdles, finishing eighth at the 2004 World Junior Championships. In the relay, she won the 2004 European Cup First League, finished seventh at the 2004 World Junior Championships and sixth at the 2004 Olympic Games.

2005 saw much less success in the relay, as she and the Romanian team went from winning to only placing fourth at the 2005 European Cup First League (as well as seventh in the 4 × 100 metres); failed to finish the race at the 2005 European Junior Championships, and did not reach the final at the 2005 World Championships. Individually, however, 2005 entailed being double Romanian indoor champion (60 and 200), Balkan indoor champion (200, as well as 60 metres silver), placing fifth at the European Cup (100 m), becoming triple Romanian champion (100, 200, 400 m), double bronze medallist at the 2005 European Junior Championships (200, 400 m) and finally becoming double Balkan junior champion (100, 200 m). She also competed at the 2005 European Indoor Championships without reaching the final.

In her first year as a senior, 2006, she went through an extensive indoor season with competitions in seven European countries before reaching the semi-final twice at the 2006 World Indoor Championships (60 and 400 metres). She also started the outdoor season early, in April at the Dakar Grand Prix, her first race outside of Europe. Having finished second at the 2006 European Cup (but only fourth in the hurdles), she managed to repeat the feat as a triple Romanian champion before the 2006 European Championships. Here, she finished eighth in the 200 metres and reached the 400 hurdles semi.

Sitting out the relay entirely for 2006, she returned to finish fifth at the 2007 European U23 Championships. Individually, her main achievement was the gold medal in 400 metres hurdles at the same championships as well as the fourth place in 400 metres at the 2007 European Indoor Championships. She became Romanian indoor and outdoor champion in the 400, won the 2007 European Champion Clubs Cup 200, and won silver medals at the Romanian indoor 60 metres, Balkan indoor 400 and Romanian outdoor 200 metres. However, the Romanian Championships on 27–28 July were her last competitions in 2007. 2008 also saw her compete much more sparingly, only six different championships, but with a significant yield. Her double Romanian indoor titles now came in the 60 and 60 metres hurdles; she then achieved two fifth places at the 2008 World Indoor Championships (400 and relay) and reached the semi-final of the 2008 Olympic Games.

Morosanu won the 2009 Romania indoor championships and Balkan indoor championships, both in the 60 metres, reaching the final in neither 60 or 60 hurdles at the 2009 European Indoor Championships. Outdoors, she focused solely on the 400 metres hurdles and finished second at the 2009 European Team Championships First League (and won both relays), won the Romanian championships, finished eighth at the 2009 World Championships and fourth at the 2009 World Athletics Final. Also competing in the European meet circuit, she won both the Spitzen Leichtathletik and British Grand Prix meets of 2009.

In 2010 she largely sat out the indoor season, before she among others finished seventh at the 2010 Golden Gala, second at the 2010 European Team Championships First League, third at the British Grand Prix and first at the Romanian championships. At the 2010 European Championships she finished fifth at the low hurdles and sixth at the relay.

After missing most of 2011, she returned to the 2012 season with another European Championships and her third Olympic Games. Starting with the indoor season, she became double Romanian indoor champion in the 60 and 60 hurdles, before entering the World Indoor Championships. Her path in the 60 metres hurdles stopped in the semi-final, but she won a bronze medal in the 4 × 400 metres relay. She did not reach the individual final at the 2012 European Championships, the 2012 Olympic Games or the 2013 European Indoor Championships either, but became Romanian champion again, and finished seventh in the 2012 European Championships relay.

In 2013 she won the Balkan indoor championship; then won two events (individual and relay) at both the 2013 European Athletics Team Championships First League, the 2014 European Athletics Team Championships First League and the 2014 Balkan Championships. At the 2014 European Championships she reached the final in neither low hurdles or relay.

After winning the 2015 Romanian indoor championships (60 m hurdles), Balkan Indoor Championships (400 m and 4 × 400 m relay), Romanian championships and Balkan Championships (both 400 m hurdles), she was largely absent from competing in 2016.

== Long jump ==
Morosanu started 2017 by winning the Romanian indoor championships in the 60 metres – and her new event, the long jump. Her winning result of 6.56 metres was improved to 6.66 metres, achieved at the 2017 Romaniann championships in Pitesti where she took silver. Her three weakest results of the season, however came at the 2017 European Indoor Championships, the 2017 European Team Championships and the 2017 World Championships. She also finished fourth at the 2017 Balkan Championships.

Double silver medals at the 2018 Romanian indoor and Balkan indoor championships were followed by double bronze at the outdoor editions of the respective events. She failed to reach the final at the 2018 European Championships.

Her last major competition was the 2019 Romanian championships, where she won the bronze. 6.66 metres remained her lifetime best.

== Personal bests ==
- 60 metres – 7.30 seconds (Bucureşti, February 2005)
- 100 metres – 11.47 seconds (Firenze, June 2005)
- 200 metres – 22.91 (Málaga, June 2006)
- 400 metres – 51.93i (Birmingham, March 2007)
- 60 metres hurdles – 8.11 seconds (Bucureşti, February 2012
- 400 metres hurdles – 53.85 seconds (Shanghai, May 2013)
- Long jump – 6.66 metres (Piteşti, July 2017)

She also co-holds the Romanian indoor record in the 4 x 400 metres relay, achieved at the 2004 World Indoor Championships in Budapest.
