= Sherene Pinnock =

Jamaican hurdler

Medal record

Athletics

Representing Jamaica

World Junior Championships
Bronze medal – third place	2006 Beijing	400 m hurdles
Bronze medal – third place	2006 Beijing	4x400 m relay
Bronze medal – third place	2004 Grosseto	400 m hurdles
Bronze medal – third place	2004 Grosseto	4x400 m relay

CAC Junior Championships (U20)
Gold medal – first place	2006 Port of Spain	400 m hurdles
Gold medal – first place	2006 Port of Spain	4x400 m relay

CARIFTA Games Junior (U20)
Gold medal – first place	2006 Les Abymes	400 m hurdles
Gold medal – first place	2006 Les Abymes	4x400 m relay
Gold medal – first place	2005 Bacolet	400 m hurdles
Gold medal – first place	2004 Hamilton	400 m hurdles
Gold medal – first place	2004 Hamilton	4x400 m relay

CARIFTA Games Youth (U17)
Gold medal – first place	2003 Port of Spain	300 m hurdles
Gold medal – first place	2003 Port of Spain	4x400 m relay

Sherene Pinnock (born 30 March 1987, in Saint Catherine) is a Jamaican 400 metres hurdles runner.

Her personal best is 56.67 seconds, achieved at the 2006 World Junior Championships in Beijing.

== Achievements ==
Year	Competition	Venue	Position	Event	Notes
Representing Jamaica
2003	CARIFTA Games (U17)	Port of Spain, Trinidad and Tobago	1st	300 m hurdles	42.24
2003	CARIFTA Games (U17)	Port of Spain, Trinidad and Tobago	1st	4x400 m relay	3:39.50 CR
2004	CARIFTA Games (U20)	Hamilton, Bermuda	1st	400 m hurdles	58.98
2004	CARIFTA Games (U20)	Hamilton, Bermuda	1st	4x400 m relay	3:40.12
2004	World Junior Championships	Grosseto, Italy	3rd	400 m hurdles	57.54
2004	World Junior Championships	Grosseto, Italy	3rd	4x400 m relay	3:30.37
2005	CARIFTA Games (U20)	Bacolet, Trinidad and Tobago	1st	400 m hurdles	57.18
2005	CARIFTA Games (U20)	Bacolet, Trinidad and Tobago	1st	4×400m relay	3:36.91
2005	Pan American Junior Championships	Windsor, Canada	4th	400m hurdles	60.82
2005	Pan American Junior Championships	Windsor, Canada	2nd	4×400m relay	3:36.99
2006	CARIFTA Games (U20)	Les Abymes, Guadeloupe	1st	400 m hurdles	57.50
2006	CARIFTA Games (U20)	Les Abymes, Guadeloupe	1st	4x400 m relay	3:31.90 CR
2006	Central American and Caribbean Junior Championships (U-20)	Port of Spain, Trinidad and Tobago	1st	400 m hurdles	57.09 CR
2006	Central American and Caribbean Junior Championships (U-20)	Port of Spain, Trinidad and Tobago	1st	4x400 m relay	3:36.02
2006	World Junior Championships	Beijing, China	3rd	400 m hurdles	56.67 PB
2006	World Junior Championships	Beijing, China	3rd	4x400 m relay	3:31.62
