= Sara Petersen (hurdler) =

Danish hurdler (born 1987)

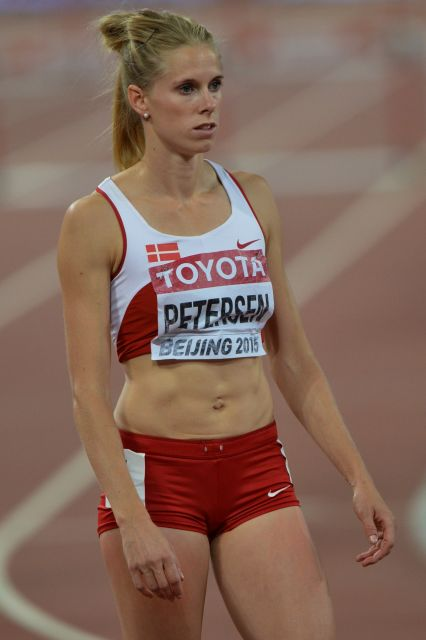

Personal information
- Born: 9 April 1987 (age 39) Nykøbing Falster, Denmark
- Height: 1.71 m (5 ft 7 1/2 in)
- Weight: 58 kg (128 lb)

Sport
- Country: Denmark
- Sport: Athletics
- Events: 400 metres, 400 metres hurdles
Medal record
Women's athletics
Representing Denmark
Olympic Games
| Silver medal – second place | 2016 Rio de Janeiro | 400 m hurdles |
European Championships
| Gold medal – first place | 2016 Amsterdam | 400 m hurdles |

Sara Slott Petersen (born 9 April 1987) is a Danish hurdler. At the 2016 Summer Olympics, she competed in the Women's 400 metres hurdles and won a silver medal.

== Competition record ==
| Year | Competition | Venue | Position | Event | Notes |
Representing Denmark
| 2003 | World Youth Championships | Sherbrooke, Canada | 4th | 400 m hurdles | 59.42 |
| 2004 | World Junior Championships | Grosseto, Italy | 14th (h) | 400 m hurdles | 60.60 |
| 2005 | European Junior Championships | Kaunas, Lithuania | 4th | 400 m hurdles | 58.85 |
| 2006 | World Junior Championships | Beijing, China | 9th (sf) | 400 m hurdles | 57.65 |
| 2009 | European Indoor Championships | Turin, Italy | 11th (sf) | 400 m | 54.63 |
| 2009 | Universiade | Belgrade, Serbia | 3rd | 400 m hurdles | 56.40 |
| 2009 | European U23 Championships | Kaunas, Lithuania | 6th | 400 m hurdles | 56.77 |
| 2009 | World Championships | Berlin, Germany | 20th (sf) | 400 m hurdles | 56.99 |
| 2010 | European Championships | Barcelona, Spain | 22nd (h) | 400 m hurdles | 57.28 |
| 2011 | Universiade | Shenzhen, China | 4th | 400 m hurdles | 56.54 |
| 2011 | World Championships | Daegu, South Korea | 18th (sf) | 400 m hurdles | 56.49 |
| 2012 | European Championships | Helsinki, Finland | 9th (sf) | 400 m hurdles | 56.07 |
| 2012 | Olympic Games | London, United Kingdom | 19th (sf) | 400 m hurdles | 56.21 |
| 2014 | European Championships | Zürich, Switzerland | – | 400 m hurdles | DQ |
| 2015 | European Indoor Championships | Prague, Czech Republic | 11th (sf) | 400 m | 53.82 |
| 2015 | World Championships | Beijing, China | 4th | 400 m hurdles | 54.20 |
| 2016 | European Championships | Amsterdam, Netherlands | 1st | 400 m hurdles | 55.12 |
| 2016 | Olympic Games | Rio de Janeiro, Brazil | 2nd | 400 m hurdles | 53.55 NR |
| 2017 | European Indoor Championships | Belgrade, Serbia | 8th (sf) | 400 m | 52.86 |
| 2017 | World Championships | London, United Kingdom | 9th (sf) | 400 m hurdles | 55.45 |
| 2018 | European Championships | Berlin, Germany | 18th (sf) | 400 m hurdles | 56.91 |
| 2019 | World Championships | Doha, Qatar | – | 400 m hurdles | DQ |
| 2021 | Olympic Games | Tokyo, Japan | 16th (h) | 400 m hurdles | 55.52^{1} |

^{1}Disqualified in the semifinals

== Gallery ==
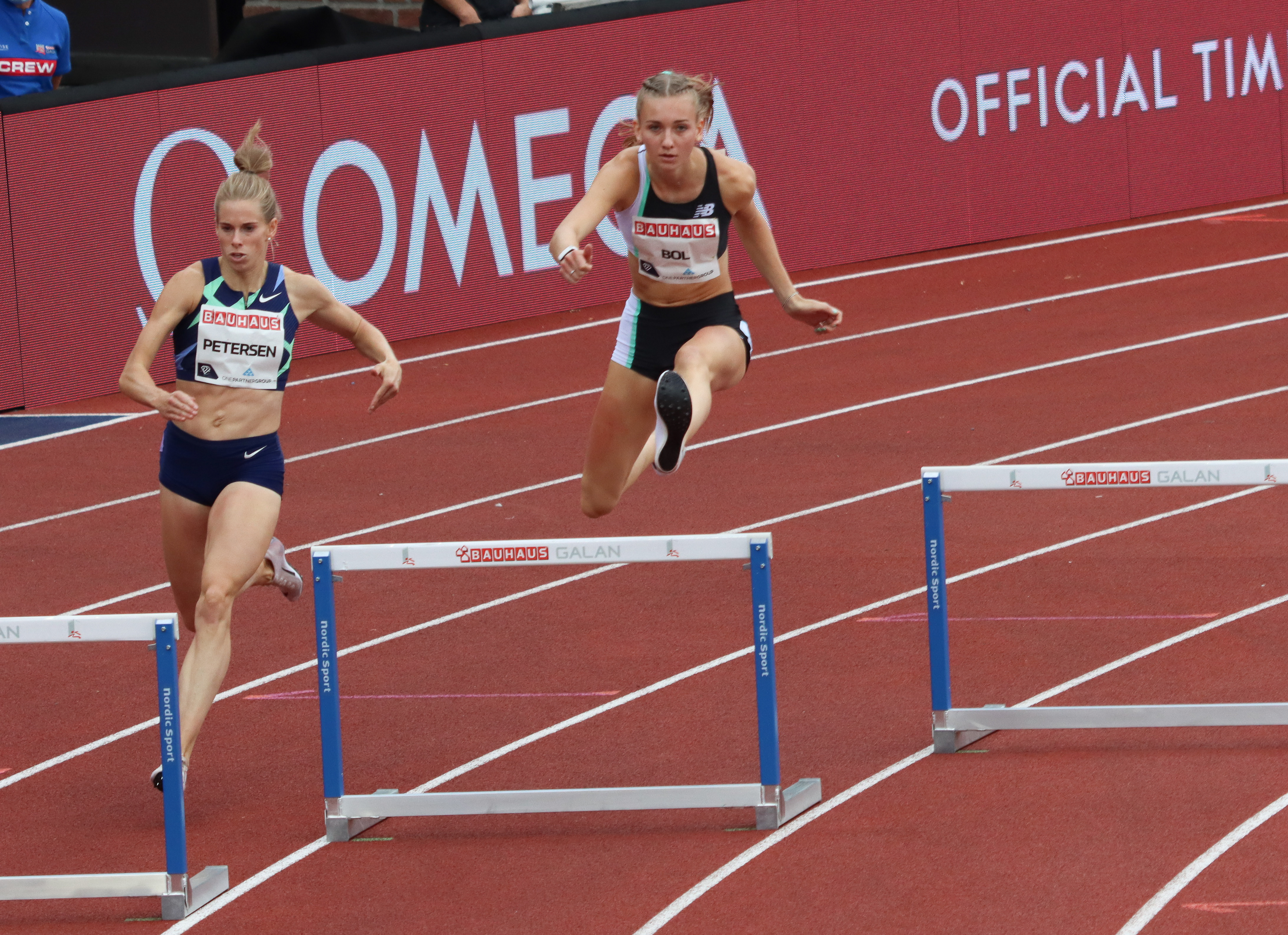
Sara Slott Petersen (l) and Femke Bol at the 2020 Bauhaus Galan meeting in Stockholm

Olympic Games
| Preceded by Caroline Wozniacki | Flagbearer for Denmark (with Jonas Warrer); Tokyo 2020 | Succeeded by Incumbent |
