= Athletics at the 2008 Summer Olympics – Women's 400 metres hurdles =

Women's 400 metres hurdles at the Games of the XXIX Olympiad
- Venue: Beijing National Stadium
- Dates: 17 August 2008 (heats); 18 August 2008 (semi-finals); 20 August 2008 (final)
- Competitors: 27 from 21 nations
- Winning time: 52.64 s OR

Medalists
1st place, gold medalist(s)		Melaine Walker	Jamaica
2nd place, silver medalist(s)		Sheena Tosta	United States
3rd place, bronze medalist(s)		Tasha Danvers	Great Britain

The women's 400 metres hurdles at the 2008 Summer Olympics took place on 17–20 August at the Beijing National Stadium.

The qualifying standards were 55.60 s (A standard) and 56.50 s (B standard).

== Schedule ==
All times are China Standard Time (UTC+8)

Date	Time	Round
Sunday, August 17, 2008	20:10-20:42	Round 1
Monday, August 18, 2008	20:45-21:00	Semifinals
Wednesday, August 20, 2008	22:35-22:40	Final

== Records ==
Prior to this competition, the existing world record, Olympic record, and world leading time were as follows:

World record	Yuliya Pechonkina (RUS)	52.34 s	Tula, Russia	8 August 2003
Olympic record	Fani Halkia (GRE)	52.77 s	Athens, Greece	22 August 2004
World Leading	Melaine Walker (JAM)	53.48 s	Fontvieille, Monaco	29 July 2008

The following new Olympic record was set during this competition.

Date	Event	Name	Nationality	Time	OR	WR
20 August	Final	Melaine Walker	Jamaica	52.64	OR	

== Results ==
=== Round 1 ===
The first three runners of each heat (Q) plus the next four overall fastest runners (q) qualified for the Semifinals.

Rank	Heat	Name	Nationality	Result	Notes
1	3	Melaine Walker	Jamaica	54.46	Q
2	4	Ekaterina Bikert	Russia	55.15	Q
3	3	Anastasiya Rabchenyuk	Ukraine	55.18	Q
4	2	Tasha Danvers	Great Britain	55.19	Q, SB
5	3	Tsvetelina Kirilova	Bulgaria	55.22	Q, PB
6	2	Anastasiya Ott	Russia	55.34	Q
7	4	Anna Jesień	Poland	55.35	Q
8	1	Tiffany Ross-Williams	United States	55.51	Q
9	1	Irina Obedina	Russia	55.71	Q
10	2	Nickiesha Wilson	Jamaica	55.75	Q
11	1	Satomi Kubokura	Japan	55.82	Q, SB
12	4	Zuzana Hejnová	Czech Republic	55.91	Q
13	3	Queen Harrison	United States	55.96	q
14	2	Angela Moroșanu	Romania	56.07	q, SB
15	2	Sheena Tosta	United States	56.12	q
16	3	Aïssata Soulama	Burkina Faso	56.37	q
17	1	Shevon Stoddart	Jamaica	56.52	
18	2	Nikolina Horvat	Croatia	56.65	
19	4	Tatyana Azarova	Kazakhstan	56.88	
20	4	Muna Jabir Adam	Sudan	57.16	
21	1	Ieva Zunda	Latvia	57.43	
22	1	Lucimar Teodoro	Brazil	57.68	
23	4	Josanne Lucas	Trinidad and Tobago	57.76	
24	3	Carole Kaboud Mebam	Cameroon	57.81	
25	2	Michelle Carey	Ireland	57.99	
26	4	Laia Forcadell	Spain	58.64	
27	3	Galina Pedan	Kyrgyzstan	1:00.31	

=== Semifinals ===
Qualification: First 4 in each heat (Q) advance to the Final.

Rank	Heat	Name	Nationality	Result	Notes
1	1	Sheena Tosta	United States	54.07	Q
2	2	Melaine Walker	Jamaica	54.20	Q
3	1	Tasha Danvers	Great Britain	54.31	Q, SB
4	1	Anna Jesień	Poland	54.36	Q
5	1	Ekaterina Bikert	Russia	54.38	Q
6	2	Anastasiya Rabchenyuk	Ukraine	54.60	Q, PB
7	1	Nickiesha Wilson	Jamaica	54.67	
8	1	Anastasiya Ott	Russia	54.74	PB
9	2	Tiffany Ross-Williams	United States	54.99	Q
10	2	Zuzana Hejnová	Czech Republic	55.17	Q
11	2	Aïssata Soulama	Burkina Faso	55.69	SB
12	2	Irina Obedina	Russia	55.69	
13	2	Queen Harrison	United States	55.88	
14	2	Tsvetelina Kirilova	Bulgaria	55.97	
15	1	Satomi Kubokura	Japan	56.69	
16	1	Angela Moroșanu	Romania	57.67	

=== Final ===
Rank	Lane	Name	Nationality	Reaction	Time	Notes
1st place, gold medalist(s)	6	Melaine Walker	Jamaica	0.236	52.64	OR, NR
2nd place, silver medalist(s)	5	Sheena Tosta	United States	0.191	53.70	
3rd place, bronze medalist(s)	7	Tasha Danvers	Great Britain	0.189	53.84	PB
4	4	Anastasiya Rabchenyuk	Ukraine	0.248	53.96	PB
5	9	Anna Jesień	Poland	0.206	54.29	SB
6	2	Ekaterina Bikert	Russia	0.193	54.96	
7	3	Zuzana Hejnová	Czech Republic	0.195	54.97	
8	8	Tiffany Ross-Williams	United States	0.184	57.55	

(OR = Olympic record; NR = National Record; PB = Personal Best; SB = Season Best.)
