= 2008 IAAF World Indoor Championships – Women's 400 metres =

The winning margin was 0.01 seconds which as of July 2024 is the only time the women's 400 metres has been won by less than a tenth of a second at these championships. Of the six finalists, the winner had the slowest reaction time.

== Medallists ==
Gold
Olesya Zykina	Russia
Silver
Natalya Nazarova	Russia
Bronze
Shareese Woods	United States

== Heats ==
Heat	Lane	Name	Country	Mark	Q	React
1	6	Olesya Zykina	Russia	51.96	Q	0.244
1	4	Moushaumi Robinson	United States	52.45	Q	0.258
1	3	Makelesi Batimala	Fiji	54.02 PB	Q	0.217
1	1	Nikolett Listar	Hungary	55.37		0.237
1	2	Martina Xuereb	Malta	57.62 NR		0.282
1	5	Moya Thompson	Jamaica	DNF		0.315
2	5	Natalya Nazarova	Russia	52.40	Q	0.157
2	3	Antonina Yefremova	Ukraine	52.64	Q	0.163
2	6	Shareese Woods	United States	52.65	Q	0.240
2	4	Zuzana Hejnová	Czech Republic	53.04	q	0.146
2	1	Racheal Nachula	Zambia	53.52 NR	q	0.257
2	2	Vera Barbosa	Cape Verde	57.55		0.281
3	6	Amantle Montsho	Botswana	52.96 PB	Q	0.290
3	2	Angela Moroșanu	Romania	53.32 SB	Q	0.249
3	5	Christy Ekpukhon Ihunaegbo	Nigeria	53.34	Q	0.187
3	3	Nataliya Pyhyda	Ukraine	53.44	q	0.187
3	4	Tsvetelina Kirilova	Bulgaria	53.66		0.195
3	1	Sandrine Thiébaud-Kangni	Togo	54.02 SB	0.209	

== Semifinals ==
Heat	Lane	Name	Country	Mark	Q	React
1	5	Olesya Zykina	Russia	51.75	Q	0.315
1	3	Antonina Yefremova	Ukraine	51.79 PB	Q	0.228
1	6	Moushaumi Robinson	United States	51.85 PB	Q	0.248
1	1	Racheal Nachula	Zambia	53.30 NR		0.317
1	2	Makelesi Batimala	Fiji	54.23		0.275
1	4	Christy Ekpukhon Ihunaegbo	Nigeria	DNS		
2	6	Natalya Nazarova	Russia	51.62	Q	0.287
2	3	Shareese Woods	United States	51.87 PB	Q	0.193
2	4	Angela Moroșanu	Romania	52.83 SB	Q	0.273
2	2	Zuzana Hejnová	Czech Republic	53.16		0.142
2	5	Amantle Montsho	Botswana	53.21		0.266
2	1	Nataliya Pyhyda	Ukraine	53.33		

== Final ==
Heat	Lane	Name	Country	Mark	React
Gold medal	6	Olesya Zykina	Russia	51.09 WL	0.297
Silver medal	5	Natalya Nazarova	Russia	51.10 SB	0.247
Bronze medal	3	Shareese Woods	United States	51.41 PB	0.237
4	4	Antonina Yefremova	Ukraine	51.53 PB	0.147
5	2	Angela Moroșanu	Romania	53.07	0.269
6	1	Moushaumi Robinson	United States	53.10	0.257
