= Nikolina Horvat =

Croatian hurdler (born 1986)

Personal information
- Born: 18 September 1986 (age 39) Zagreb, Croatia
- Height: 1.60 m (5 ft 3 in)
- Weight: 53 kg (117 lb)

Sport
- Country: Croatia
- Club: AC Zagreb Ulix

Achievements and titles
- Personal best: 56.28 (2008)
Medal record
Women's athletics
Representing Croatia
Mediterranean Games
Bronze medal – third place	2009 Pescara	400 m hurdles

Nikolina Horvat (born 18 September 1986 in Zagreb) is a Croatian athlete. She competed at the 2008 Summer Olympics and the 2012 Summer Olympics in 400 m hurdles event.

== Competition record ==
Year	Competition	Venue	Position	Event	Notes
Representing Croatia
2004	World Junior Championships	Grosseto, Italy	17th (h)	400 m hurdles	61.14
2005	European Junior Championships	Kaunas, Lithuania	6th	400 m hurdles	59.15
2006	European Championships	Gothenburg, Sweden	26th (h)	400 m hurdles	57.95
2007	European U23 Championships	Debrecen, Hungary	7th	400 m hurdles	58.54
2008	Olympic Games	Beijing, China	18th (h)	400 m hurdles	56.65
2009	Mediterranean Games	Pescara, Italy	3rd	400 m hurdles	56.97
2010	European Championships	Barcelona, Spain	17th (h)	400 m hurdles	56.64
2011	World Championships	Daegu, South Korea	22nd (sf)	400 m hurdles	57.02
2012	European Championships	Helsinki, Finland	20th (h)	400 m hurdles	57.74
2012	Olympic Games	London, United Kingdom	36th (h)	400 m hurdles	58.49
