= 2013 Balkan Athletics Indoor Championships =

- Dates: 23 February
- Host city: Istanbul, Turkey
- Venue: Ataköy Athletics Arena
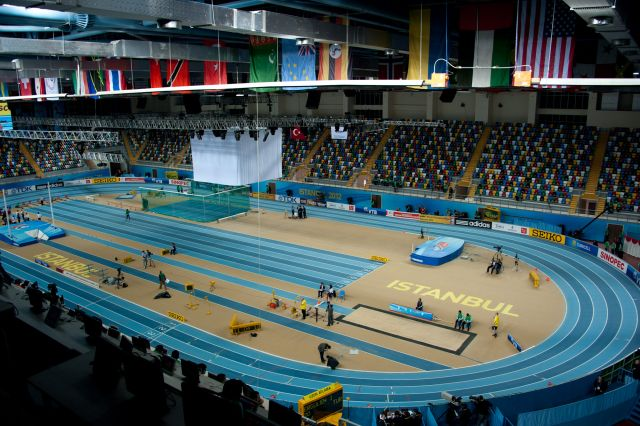
- Events: 24

The 2013 Balkan Athletics Indoor Championships was the 18th edition of the annual indoor track and field competition for athletes from the Balkans, organised by Balkan Athletics. It was held on 23 February at the Ataköy Athletics Arena in Istanbul, Turkey.

== Results ==
=== Men ===
Event	Gold		Silver		Bronze	
60 metres	Efthímios Steryioúlis (GRE)	6.75	Denis Dimitrov (BUL)	6.76	Volkan Çakan (TUR)	6.79
400 metres	Mateo Ružić (CRO)	47.16 PB	Yavuz Can (TUR)	47.29	Pétros Kiriakídis (GRE)	47.30
800 metres	Halit Kiliç (TUR)	1:51.21	Nemanja Kojić (SRB)	1:51.52	Konstandinos Nakopoulos (GRE)	1:51.75
1500 metres	İlham Tanui Özbilen (TUR)	3:37.49	Goran Nava (SRB)	3:42.56	Halil Akkaş (TUR)	3:43.60
3000 metres	Polat Kemboi Arıkan (TUR)	7:51.84	Mitko Tsenov (BUL)	8:13.73 PB	Cristian Vorovenci (ROU)	8:19.34 PB
60 m hurdles	Konstadinos Douvalidis (GRE)	7.80	Mustafa Güneş (TUR)	8.00 PB=	Batuhan Eruygun (TUR)	8.01
High jump	Adonios Mastoras (GRE)	2.26 m	Andrei Mîţîcov (MDA)	2.19 m	Serhat Birinci (TUR)	2.18 m
Pole vault	Ivan Horvat (CRO)	5.60 m NR	Dimitrios Patsoukakis (GRE)	5.20 m	Panayiótis Láskaris (GRE)	5.20 m
Long jump	Dino Pervan (CRO)	7.67 m PB	Anastásios Galazoúlas (GRE)	7.64 m	Andrei Sasca (ROU)	7.34 m
Triple jump	Vladimir Letnicov (MDA)	16.59 m	Rumen Dimitrov (BUL)	16.37 m	Alexandru George Baciu (ROU)	16.24 m
Shot put	Asmir Kolašinac (SRB)	20.54 m	Hamza Alić (BIH)	19.87 m	Georgi Ivanov (BUL)	19.78 m

=== Women ===
Event	Gold		Silver		Bronze	
60 metres	Andreea Ogrăzeanu (ROU)	7.39	Ivana Španović (SRB)	7.54	Aksel Gürcan Demirtaş (TUR)	7.56
400 metres	Angela Moroșanu (ROU)	52.64	Anita Banović (CRO)	54.40	Teodora Kolarova (BUL)	54.61
800 metres	Mirela Lavric (ROU)	2:09.10	Aslı Arık (TUR)	2:09.60	Teodora Kolarova (BUL)	2:10.36
1500 metres	Luiza Gega (ALB)	4:14.65	Silvia Danekova (BUL)	4:16.36 PB	Florina Pierdevară (ROU)	4:19.68 PB
3000 metres	Dudu Karakaya (TUR)	9:02.14 PB	Ancuța Bobocel (ROU)	9:03.56	Amela Terzić (SRB)	9:06.38
60 m hurdles	Nevin Yanıt (TUR)	7.98 NR	Ivana Lončarek (CRO)	8.29	Anamaria Nesteriuc (ROU)	8.63
High jump	Ana Šimić (CRO)	1.93 m PB	Venelina Veneva-Mateeva (BUL) Daniela Stanciu (ROU)	1.91 m	Not awarded	
Pole vault	Stella-Iro Ledaki (GRE)	4.45 m PB	Lorela Manou (GRE)	4.00 m	Elmas Seda Firtina (TUR)	3.90 m PB=
Long jump	Ivana Španović (SRB)	6.73 m NR	Cristina Sandu (ROU)	6.43 m	Sevim Sinmez Serbest (TUR)	6.34 m
Triple jump	Gita Dodova (BUL)	13.98 m	Carmen Toma (ROU)	13.64 m	Sevim Sinmez Serbest (TUR)	13.37 m
Shot put	Anca Heltne (ROU)	18.54 m	Radoslava Mavrodieva (BUL)	17.29 m	Emel Dereli (TUR)	17.04 m NJR
