= Yekaterina Bikert =

Russian athlete

Yekaterina Eduardovna Bikert (Russian: Екатерина Эдуардовна Бикерт, born 13 May 1980) is a Russian athlete who specializes in the 400 metres hurdles.

Her personal best time is 53.72 seconds, achieved in July 2004 in Tula.

She competed in the 400m hurdles at the 2008 Beijing Olympics where she qualified as the second fastest overall for the second round, with a time of 55.15 seconds.

She is 5 ft 10 inches and weighs 150 lbs.

== International competitions ==
Representing Russia
Year	Competition	Venue	Position	Event	Notes
2004	Olympic Games	Athens, Greece	6th	400 m hurdles	
2004	World Athletics Final	Monte Carlo, Monaco	7th	400 m hurdles	
