= Kaliese Spencer =

Jamaican hurdler (born 1987)

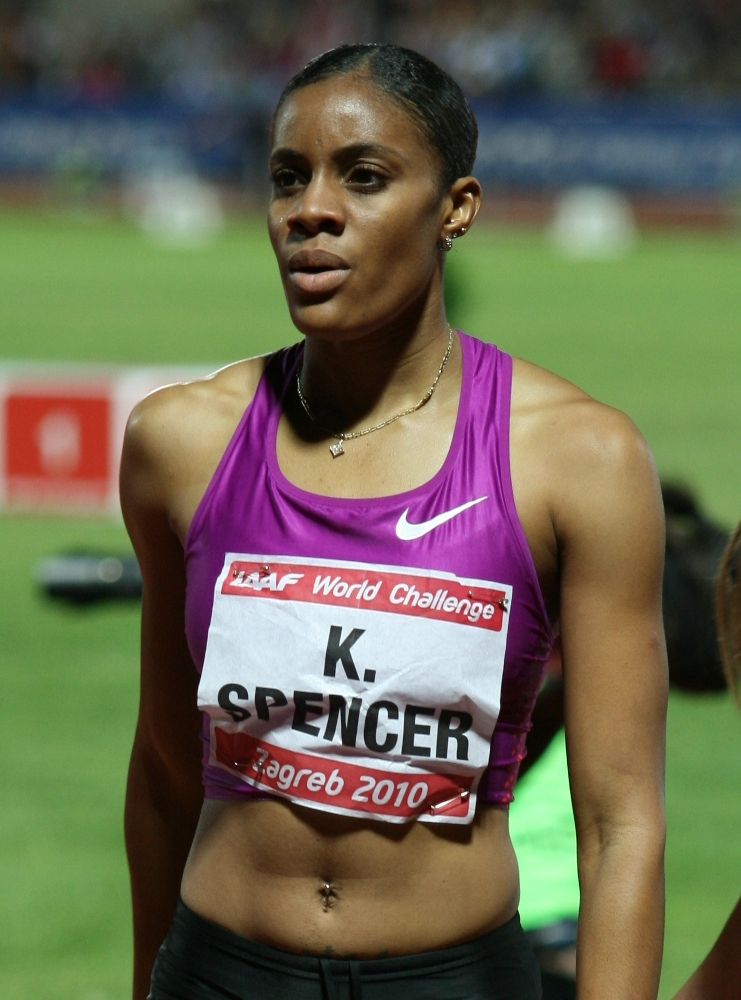
- Spencer at the 2010 Hanžeković Memorial

Personal information
- Nationality: Jamaican
- Born: 6 May 1987 (age 39)
- Height: 1.80 m (5 ft 11 in)
- Weight: 75 kg (165 lb)

Sport
- Country: Jamaica
- Sport: Athletics
- Event: 400 m hurdles
- College team: UTech
- Club: MVP Track & Field Club
- Coached by: Stephen Francis
Medal record
Women's athletics
Representing Jamaica
Olympic Games
| Bronze medal – third place | 2012 London | 400 m hurdles |
World Championships
| Silver medal – second place | 2009 Berlin | 4x400 m relay |
World Indoor Championships
| Silver medal – second place | 2014 Sopot | 400 m |
| Silver medal – second place | 2014 Sopot | 4×400 m relay |
World Relays
| Silver medal – second place | 2014 Nassau | 4x400 m relay |
Diamond League
| First place | 2010 | 400 m hurdles |
| First place | 2011 | 400 m hurdles |
| First place | 2012 | 400 m hurdles |
| First place | 2014 | 400 m hurdles |
Commonwealth Games
| Gold medal – first place | 2014 Glasgow | 400 m hurdles |
World Junior Championships
| Gold medal – first place | 2006 Beijing | 400 m hurdles |
| Bronze medal – third place | 2006 Beijing | 4x400 m relay |

Kaliese Spencer Carter, née Kaliese Spencer, (6 May 1987) is a Jamaican track and field athlete who specialises in the 400 metres hurdles. She won the bronze medal in the event at the 2012 London Olympics. Spencer was the Commonwealth Games champion in 2014 and a double silver medallist at the 2014 World Indoor Championships. She finished fourth at both the 2009 and 2011 World Championships in Athletics.

Spencer was the 2006 World junior champion. She is a four-time Diamond League 400 m hurdles winner.

== Career ==
Born in the parish of Westmoreland, Jamaica, her mother, Merfelin Spencer was a 400 m runner in college and her father Joshua Spencer was a middle-distance runner and she followed in their footsteps into the sport of athletics. She attended the University of Technology in Jamaica and began focusing on her running under the tutelage of Stephen Francis as part of his Maximising Velocity and Power Track Club. She had her first hurdles success at the 2006 World Junior Championships in Athletics, where she won the junior 400 m hurdles title with a personal best run of 55.11 seconds. Her debut at the senior level came the following year and she reached the semi-finals of her event at the 2007 World Championships in Athletics in Osaka.

Spencer made a strong start to the 2008 outdoor season by running a world-leading time in the 400 metres at the Azuza Pacific Invitational, winning in a personal best time of 50.55 seconds. However, she suffered a hip injury and only trained sporadically in the rest of the year, missing out on the Jamaican Olympic team for the 2008 Beijing Games as a result.

She began competing in the IAAF Golden League in 2009, performing at the Reebok Grand Prix, Golden Gala and Herculis meetings, although she failed to reach the podium on those occasions. At the 2009 World Championships, Spencer reached the final of the women's 400 m hurdles and finished fourth with a personal best run of 53.56 seconds – her club teammate Melaine Walker won the gold in a championship record. She was also the substitute runner in the 4 × 400 m relay at the championships and helped her team progress to the final where they won the silver medal. She took a victory over Walker shortly afterwards at the IAAF Zagreb Grand Prix. Spencer ended her season by winning the silver medal at the 2009 IAAF World Athletics Final, running 53.99 seconds to finish behind Walker.

The 2010 IAAF Diamond League became Spencer's principal target the following year and she was sixth at first meeting, the Shanghai Golden Grand Prix in May. She won at the Meeting International Mohammed VI d'Athlétisme de Rabat, defeating Perri Shakes-Drayton, and was third in the 400 m at the Jamaican Championships that month. She began making an impact on the Diamond League, finishing as runner-up behind Lashinda Demus at the Prefontaine Classic and the Golden Gala, recording a personal best 53.48 s. She had her first win on the major circuit at the British Grand Prix. She won at the Herculis meeting soon after and also set a meet record of 53.72 s at the Spitzenleichtathletik competition in Switzerland.

The 24-year-old set a personal best in the 400 m hurdles of 52.79 s at the Aviva Grand Prix in Crystal Palace on 5 August 2011. As a result, Spencer was heavy favourite to win the gold medal at 2011 World Championships in Athletics in Daegu, South Korea, where she finished fourth.

At the 2012 London Olympics, Spencer initially narrowly missed out on a medal, finishing in fourth place in the 400 m hurdles. She was upgraded to the bronze medal in December 2022, following the stripping of gold medallist Natalya Antyukh of Russia.

Spencer won the gold medal in her specialist event at the 2014 Commonwealth Games held in Glasgow.

== Achievements ==
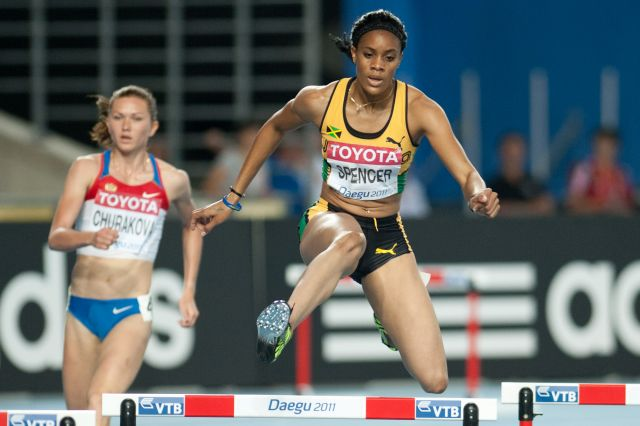
Spencer races 400 m hurdles at the 2011 World Championships in Daegu

All information taken from World Athletics profile.

=== Personal bests ===
| Event | Time (sec) | Venue | Date |
|---|---|---|---|
| 200 metres | 23.11 | Rovereto, Italy | 3 September 2013 |
| 400 metres hurdles | 52.79 | Crystal Palace, London, United Kingdom | 5 August 2011 |
| 400 metres | 50.19 | Rieti, Italy | 8 September 2013 |
| 400 metres indoor | 51.54 | Sopot, Poland | 8 March 2014 |
| 800 metres | 2:03.01 | Kingston, Jamaica | 5 March 2011 |

=== International competitions ===
Representing Jamaica
| Year | Competition | Venue | Position | Event | Time |
|---|---|---|---|---|---|
| 2006 | CARIFTA Games (U-20) | Les Abymes, Guadeloupe | 2nd | 400 m | 51.99 |
| 2006 | CARIFTA Games (U-20) | Les Abymes, Guadeloupe | 1st | 4 × 400 m relay | 3:31.90 CR |
| 2006 | World Junior Championships | Beijing, China | 1st | 400 m hurdles | 55.11 |
| 2006 | World Junior Championships | Beijing, China | 3rd | 4 × 400 m relay | 3:31.62 |
| 2007 | World Championships | Osaka, Japan | 8th (sf) | 400 m hurdles | 56.69 |
| 2009 | World Championships | Berlin, Germany | 4th | 400 m hurdles | 53.56 |
| 2009 | World Championships | Berlin, Germany | 2nd | 4 × 400 m relay | 3:24.72^{1} |
| 2009 | World Athletics Final | Thessaloniki, Greece | 2nd | 400 m hurdles | 53.99 |
| 2011 | World Championships | Daegu, South Korea | 4th | 400 m hurdles | 54.01 |
| 2012 | Olympic Games | London, United Kingdom | 3rd | 400 m hurdles | 53.66 |
| 2013 | World Championships | Moscow, Russia | – (h) | 400 m hurdles | DQ |
| 2013 | World Championships | Moscow, Russia | – (h) | 4 × 400 m relay | DQ |
| 2014 | World Indoor Championships | Sopot, Poland | 2nd | 400 m | 51.54 |
| 2014 | World Indoor Championships | Sopot, Poland | 2nd | 4 × 400 m relay | 3:26.54 |
| 2014 | World Relays | Nassau, Bahamas | 2nd | 4 × 400 m relay | 3:23.26 |
| 2014 | Commonwealth Games | Glasgow, United Kingdom | 1st | 400 m hurdles | 54.10 |
| 2015 | World Championships | Beijing, China | 8th | 400 m hurdles | 55.47 |

^{1}Time from the heats; Spencer was replaced in the final.

=== Circuit wins and titles ===
- Diamond League overall winner 400 m hurdles (4): 2010, 2011, 2012, 2014

400 metres hurdles wins, other events specified in parentheses

- 2010 (4): Gateshead British Grand Prix, Monaco Herculis, London Grand Prix, Zürich Weltklasse (PB)
- 2011 (4): Shanghai Golden Grand Prix (WL), Stockholm DN Galan (MR), London (WL MR), Zürich
- 2012 (4): Rome Golden Gala (SB), Lausanne Athletissima (SB), Birmingham British Grand Prix (MR), Brussels Memorial Van Damme
- 2014 (6): Eugene Prefontaine Classic (WL), Rome (WL), Oslo Bislett Games, Monaco, Birmingham, Brussels
- 2015 (3): Shanghai (WL), Birmingham (SB), Oslo (WL)

=== National titles ===
- Jamaican Athletics Championships
  - 400 m hurdles: 2011, 2014
