= Ieva Zunda =

Latvian athlete

Ieva Zunda (born 20 July 1978 in Tukums) is a Latvian athlete. Her main event is the 400 metres hurdles, but she also competes in the 400 and 800 metres.

Internationally she has competed in the 400 m hurdles. She did not make it past the first round at the 1999 and 2003 World Championships. At the 2004 Summer Olympics in Athens she was fourth in her heat with a result of 56.21 seconds.

In 2008 Zunda tried to reach the Olympic entry standard both in 400 m and 400 m hurdles. Shortly before the deadline - on 23 July, Ieva finally reached the entry standard in 400 m hurdles (56.50), as she clocked 56.34 seconds. She finished fifth in her heat, again missing out on a place in the second round.

== Personal bests ==
Event	Record	Venue	Year
400 metres	52.32 s	Valmiera, Latvia	July 2004
400 metres hurdles	55.59 s	Bielsko-Biała, Poland	June 2004
800 metres	2:02.8 min	Valmiera, Latvia	June 2003
