= Yekaterina Kostetskaya =

Russian track athlete (born 1986)

Personal information
- Native name: Екатерина Александровна Костецкая
- Full name: Yekaterina Aleksandrovna Kostetskaya
- Nationality: Russian
- Born: 31 December 1986 (age 39) Saint Petersburg, Russian SFSR, Soviet Union

Sport
- Sport: Hurdling; Middle-distance running

Yekaterina Aleksandrovna Kostetskaya (Russian: Екатерина Александровна Костецкая; born 31 December 1986) is a Russian track athlete. She came fifth in the 800 m final at the 2011 World Championships in Athletics, but was later disqualified for doping.

Kostetskaya competed for the Texas State Bobcats track and field team in the NCAA, where she originally specialized in the 400 metres hurdles. She later transitioned to the 800 m and eventually the 1500 m.

Kostetskaya met Australian pole vaulter Steve Hooker at the Beijing Olympics in 2008 and married him in 2012. They have three sons and live in Melbourne, Australia.

== Doping ==
IAAF announced 28 July 2014, that Kostetskaya was sanctioned for doping after her biological passport had shown abnormalities. The two-year ban ended 20 January 2015.

== International competitions ==
Representing Russia
| Year | Competition | Venue | Position | Event | Notes |
|---|---|---|---|---|---|
| 2003 | European Junior Championships | Tampere, Finland | 1st | 400 m hurdles | 57.52 |
| 2003 | European Junior Championships | Tampere, Finland | 1st | 4 × 400 m relay | 3:33.48 |
| 2003 | World Youth Championships | Sherbrooke, Canada | 2nd | 400 m hurdles | 58.37 |
| 2004 | World Junior Championships | Grosseto, Italy | 1st | 400 m hurdles | 55.55 |
| 2004 | World Junior Championships | Grosseto, Italy | 2nd | 4 × 400 m relay | 3:30.03 |
| 2005 | European Junior Championships | Kaunas, Lithuania | 2nd | 400 m hurdles | 55.89 |
| 2005 | Universiade | İzmir, Turkey | 11th (sf) | 400 m hurdles | 57.58 |
| 2007 | Universiade | Bangkok, Thailand | 2nd | 800 m | 1:59.52 |
| 2008 | Olympic Games | Beijing, China | 8th (sf) | 800 m | 1:58.33 |
| 2009 | European Team Championships | Leiria, Portugal | 2nd | 800 m | 1:59.43 |
| 2011 | World Championships | Daegu, South Korea | ~~5th~~ DSQ | 800 m | 1:57.82 |
| 2012 | Olympic Games | London, United Kingdom | ~~9th~~ DSQ | 1500 m | 4:12.90 |

== See also ==
- List of doping cases in athletics
- Doping at the Olympic Games
- List of professional sports families
- Russia at the World Athletics Championships
- Doping at the World Athletics Championships
