= Anastasiya Ott =

Russian hurdler (born 1988)

Anastasiya Vladimirovna Ott (Russian: Анастасия Владимировна Отт; born September 7, 1988) is a Russian track and field athlete who specializes in the 400 metres hurdles. Her personal best is 55.07 achieved at Kazan on July 18, 2008.

She is competing in the 400 metres hurdles at the 2008 Beijing Olympics where she qualified for the second round with the sixth fastest overall time of 55.34 seconds.
