= Madiea Ghafoor =

Dutch sprinter (born 1992)

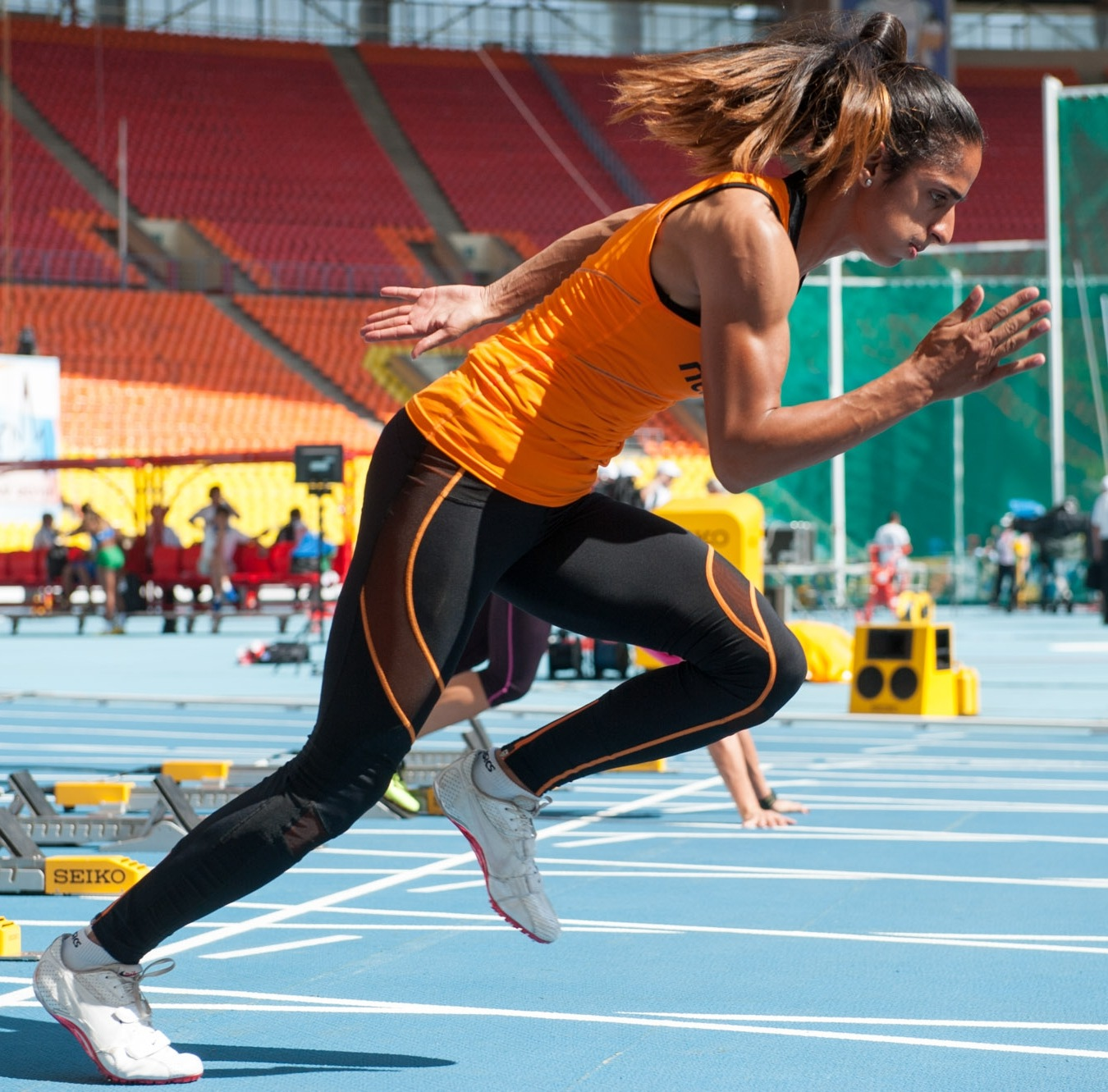
- Madiea Ghafoor in Moscow, 2013

Personal information
- National team: Netherlands
- Born: 9 September 1992 (age 33) Amsterdam, Netherlands
- Height: 1.69 m (5 ft 7 in)
- Weight: 55 kg (121 lb)

Sport
- Sport: Athletics

Madiea Ghafoor (born 9 September 1992) is a Dutch female former athlete who participated in sprinting and track and field. She mainly competed in the women's 400m sprint, but has also participated in 60m, 100m, 200m and 300m events. She was part of the Netherlands squad at the 2016 Summer Olympics. From 2019 to 2025, she was detained in Germany, convicted to an 8.5 year jail term for smuggling 50 kilograms of drugs into the country.

== Background ==
Ghafoor was born and raised in Amsterdam to Pakistani parents. Her interest in athletics began when she was at school aged 13. She trains at the Olympic Stadium in Amsterdam under the coaching of Urta Rozenstruik.

Ghafoor is of Pakistani descent; her parents belong to the Lyari district in Karachi, Sindh, belonging to the dominantly Brahui population of the district. Her grandfather, Lal Baksh Rind, was a senior politician from the Brohi community. She became the first female athlete of Rind origin to participate in the Olympic Games.

== Career ==
Ghafoor earned a bronze medal at the 2011 European Athletics Junior Championships in Estonia, coming third in the women's 400m sprint. She has also represented Netherlands in the European Athletics Indoor Championships, reaching up to the semi-finals.

== Arrest ==
On 18 June 2019, Ghafoor was arrested for drug possession during a routine border check near Elten. More than a month later it was reported that the German police had arrested her. In July she was charged with drug smuggling at Kleve district court since 50 kilograms of drugs (crystal meth and ecstasy) had been found in her car. On 4 November, she was convicted by a German court in Kleve and sentenced to an 8-year 6-month jail term. She did not appeal her sentence.

== See also ==
- List of professional sportspeople convicted of crimes
