= 2006 World Junior Championships in Athletics =

- Host city: Beijing, China
- Nations: 176
- Athletes: 1350
- Events: 44
- Dates: 15–20 August
- Main venue: Chaoyang Sports Centre

The 2006 World Junior Championships in Athletics were the 2006 version of the World Junior Championships in Athletics. It was held from 15 August to 20 August at the Chaoyang Sports Centre in Beijing, the capital of the People's Republic of China.

The Championships were dominated by the host nation China, and Kenya. The United States showed a near complete domination in the relay events. Estonia won four gold medals; their first medals ever at the World Junior Championships.

== Results ==
=== Men ===
Event	Gold		Silver		Bronze	
100 metres	Harry Aikines-Aryeetey; Great Britain	10.37 SB	Justyn Warner; Canada	10.39	Yohan Blake; Jamaica	10.42
100 metres	Remaldo Rose, bronze medalist in 2004, finished fourth. The initial qualification round saw national junior records established for Liberia, Ecuador, Azerbaijan, Cayman Islands, Serbia, Kiribati and the Northern Mariana Islands.					
200 metres	Marek Niit; Estonia	20.96 NJ	Bryan Barnett; Canada	21.00	Alexander Nelson; Great Britain	21.14
200 metres	The original winner, Dmytro Ostrovsky of Ukraine, was disqualified for stepping in another lane. The initial qualification round saw national junior records established for Gibraltar and Ecuador.					
400 metres	Renny Quow; Trinidad and Tobago	45.74 PB	Justin Oliver; United States	45.78 PB	Martyn Rooney; Great Britain	45.87
800 metres	David Rudisha; Kenya	1:47.40	Jackson Kivuna; Kenya	1:47.64	Abraham Chepkirwok; Uganda	1:47.79
1500 metres	Remmy Ndiwa; Kenya	3:40.44 SB	Abdalaati Iguider; Morocco	3:40.73	Belal Mansoor Ali; Bahrain	3:41.36
1500 metres	Iguider was the reigning champion and championship record holder. Tsegai Tewelde of Eritrea, who finished fifth, established national junior records twice during the competition.					
5000 metres	Tariku Bekele; Ethiopia	13:31.34	Abreham Cherkos; Ethiopia	13:35.95	Joseph Ebuya; Kenya	13:42.93
5000 metres	Tariku Bekele, the younger brother of World and Olympic champion Kenenisa Bekele, won a bronze medal in 2004. Ebuya already had a silver medal from the 10 000 m.					
10,000 metres	Ibrahim Jeilan; Ethiopia	28:53.29	Joseph Ebuya; Kenya	28:53.46 PB	Aadam Ismaeel Khamis; Bahrain	28:54.30 NJ
10,000 metres	National junior records were also established for Eritrea and Burundi.					
110 metres hurdles 99.0 cm	Artur Noga; Poland	13.23 CR	Samuel Coco-Viloin; France	13.35 NJ	Konstadinos Douvalidis; Greece	13.39 NJ
110 metres hurdles 99.0 cm	The hurdle height had been reduced from 106.7 cm to 99.0 cm, thus allowing championship records in all three rounds of the competition. The world's fastest juniors in 2006, Dennis Martin and Darius Reed of the United States, failed to succeed.					
400 metres hurdles	Chris Carter; United States	50.08	Bandar Sharahili; Saudi Arabia	50.34 PB	Stanislav Melnykov; Ukraine	50.43 PB
400 metres hurdles	Carter took the only individual gold medal for the United States. During the competition, national junior records were set for Togo and the Netherlands.					
3000 metres steeplechase	Willy Komen; Kenya	8:14.00 CR	Bisluke Kiplagat; Kenya	8:18.11 PB	Abdelghani Aït Bahmad; Morocco	8:20.05 NJ
3000 metres steeplechase	Komen beat the previous championship record by 2.34 seconds. Tareq Mubarak Taher of Bahrain originally finished second, but was disqualified for age cheating.					
10,000 metres walk	Bo Xiangdong; China	42:50.26	Huang Zhengyu; China	43:13.29 PB	Yusuke Suzuki; Japan	43:45.62
4 × 100 metres relay	Jamaica; Winston Barnes; Remaldo Rose; Cawayne Jervis; Yohan Blake	39.05 WJL	United States; Evander Wells; Gordon McKenzie; Willie Perry; Brandon Myers	39.21 SB	Great Britain; Rion Pierre; Alexander Nelson; Wade Bennett-Jackson; Harry Aikines-Aryeetey	39.24 SB
4 × 100 metres relay	National junior records for Canada, Cayman Islands, Chinese Taipei and Singapore in the initial heats. Germany and Nigeria fumbled in the final and did not finish; however, neither were ever in medal position.					
4 × 400 metres relay	United States; Quentin Summers; Justin Oliver; Bryshon Nellum; Chris Carter	3:03.76 WJL	Russia; Maksim Dyldin; Dmitriy Buryak; Vyacheslav Sakaev; Anton Kokorin	3:05.13 NJ	Great Britain; Chris Clarke; Grant Baker; Kris Robertson; Martyn Rooney	3:05.49 SB
4 × 400 metres relay	Kenya, in fourth set a national junior record of 3:05.54, with 800 metres medalists Kivuna and Rudisha on the last two laps, thereby improving their own record from the heats. Belgium and Czech Republic too set new NJs in the heats.					
High jump	Huang Haiqiang; China	2.32 WJL	Niki Palli; Israel	2.29	Bohdan Bondarenko; Ukraine	2.26 PB
High jump	Huang, helped by an enthusiastic home crowd, improved his personal best by 4 cm to overcome pre-event favorite Palli. Oleksandr Nartov of Ukraine, a medal prospect with a personal best of 2.26 m, exited at 2.10 in the qualification round.					
Pole vault	Germán Chiaraviglio; Argentina	5.71 CR	Yang Yansheng; China	5.54 PB	Leonid Kivalov; Russia	5.42
Pole vault	Chiaraviglio, the reigning silver medalist, improved the championship record by 6 cm. The athletes who placed from 4th to 9th all failed to clear 5.36 m.					
Long jump	Robert Crowther; Australia	8.00 AJ	Antone Belt; United States	7.95 PB	Zhang Xiaoyi; China	7.86
Long jump	Zhang was the world junior leader in 2006 with 8.17 metres. Mohammad Arzandeh of Iran, who set a national record, briefly held a medal position. Medal contenders such as Konstantin Safronov and Chris Noffke failed to qualify for the final.					
Triple jump	Benjamin Compaoré; France	16.61 WJL	Hugo Chila; Ecuador	16.49	Zhong Minwei; China	16.29
Shot put 6 kg	Margus Hunt; Estonia	20.53 WJL	Mostafa Abdul El-Moaty; Egypt	20.14	Guo Yanxiang; China	19.97
Shot put 6 kg	Discus throw gold medalist Hunt emerged as a complete surprise, having a personal best of 18.61 metres before the competition. He became the first athlete to win the gold both in shot and discus, after Rutger Smith won a gold and a bronze in 2000. Pre-event favorites such as Carlos Véliz, Sourabh Vij and Jan Petrus Hoffman all failed to break the 20-metre barrier in the final. National records were established for Kuwait and Uzbekistan.					
Discus throw 1.75 kg	Margus Hunt; Estonia	67.32 WJL	Mohammad Samimi; Iran	63.00 NJ	Martin Wierig; Germany	62.17 PB
Discus throw 1.75 kg	Hunt had established a new world junior record of 66.35 metres at 9:00 AM on the opening day. In the final, he improved it to 66.68 and then 67.32. It was the first WJC gold medal for Estonia. With 63.00 m in the final round, Samimi skipped from fourth to second, following in the footsteps of Ehsan Haddadi who won a gold medal for Iran with 62.14 m in 2004. The qualification round saw a national junior record for Samoa.					
Hammer throw 6 kg	Yevgeniy Aydamirov; Russia	78.42 CR	Kristóf Németh; Hungary	78.39	Marcel Lomnický; Slovakia	77.06 NJ
Hammer throw 6 kg	In the qualification round Yury Shayunou of Belarus set a new championship record with 76.76 metres, beating 76.43 m from 2002. Aydamirov however, with a personal best of 82.60 metres, improved this record in the final but was seriously threatened by Németh who trailed 3 centimetres behind from the second round on. Shayunou eventually finished fourth in 76.95 metres, a national junior record, and Turkmenistan and China too got new national junior records.					
Javelin throw	John Robert Oosthuizen; South Africa	83.07 CR	Ari Mannio; Finland	77.26	Roman Avramenko; Ukraine	76.01 PB
Javelin throw	Oosthuizen broke the championship record from 1996 of 79.78 metres in his second throw, and went unchallenged through the competition. New national junior records were also established for Tunisia, Serbia, Fiji (twice) and Paraguay.					
Decathlon	Arkadiy Vasilyev; Russia	8059	Yordanis García; Cuba	7850	Jordan Vandermade; New Zealand	7807
Decathlon	Vasilyev set a championship record as the 99.0 cm hurdles were used for the very first time. García finished behind his personal best in the tougher men's decathlon event, where he has 7880 points.					
WR world record | AR area record | CR championship record | GR games record | NR national record | OR Olympic record | PB personal best | SB season best | WL world leading (in a given season)

=== Women ===
Event	Gold		Silver		Bronze	
100 metres	Tezdzhan Naimova; Bulgaria	11.28	Gabby Mayo; United States	11.42	Carrie Russell; Jamaica	11.42
100 metres	World junior leader Alexandria Anderson finished sixth. The initial qualification round saw national junior records established for Singapore, Chad and the Marshall Islands.					
200 metres	Tezdzhan Naimova; Bulgaria	22.99 PB	Vanda Gomes; Brazil	23.59 SB	Ewelina Klocek; Poland	23.63 PB
200 metres	Naimova, taking her second gold medal at the Championships, was virtually unchallenged. World junior leader Gabby Mayo finished sixth.					
400 metres	Danijela Grgić; Croatia	50.78 WJL	Sonita Sutherland; Jamaica	51.42	Nawal El Jack; Sudan	51.67 SB
400 metres	Sutherland was also the silver medalist of the 2004 edition. Two Zambian junior records were established in the qualifying rounds.					
800 metres	Olga Cristea; Moldova	2:04.52 SB	Winny Chebet; Kenya	2:04.59 PB	Rebekah Noble; United States	2:04.90
800 metres	Cristea won the first World Championships title of any kind for Moldova.					
1500 metres	Irene Jelagat; Kenya	4:08.88 PB	Mercy Kosgei; Kenya	4:12.48	Yuriko Kobayashi; Japan	4:12.88
1500 metres	During the competition, national junior records were set for Serbia (twice) and Eritrea.					
3000 metres	Veronica Wanjiru; Kenya	9:02.90 SB	Pauline Korikwiang; Kenya	9:05.21	Song Liwei; China	9:06.35 PB
5000 metres	Xue Fei; China	15:31.61 PB	Florence Kiplagat; Kenya	15:32.34 PB	Mary Ngugi; Kenya	15:36.82 PB
3000 metres steeplechase	Caroline Tuigong; Kenya	9:40.95 CR	Ancuța Bobocel; Romania	9:46.19 AJR	Mekdes Bekele Tadese; Ethiopia	9:48.67
3000 metres steeplechase	The winner ran barefoot. Bobocel successfully defended her silver medal from the 2004 edition. Additional national records were set by Latvian fourth-place finisher Poļina Jeļizarova as well as for Portugal, France and Algeria in the heats.					
100 metres hurdles	Yekaterina Shtepa; Russia	13.33 WJL	Christina Vukicevic; Norway	13.34 NJ	Tiffany Ofili; United States	13.37 PB
400 metres hurdles	Kaliese Spencer; Jamaica	55.11 WJL	Nicole Leach; United States	55.55	Sherene Pinnock; Jamaica	56.67 PB
400 metres hurdles	Pinnock was also the bronze medalist in the 2004 edition.					
10,000 metres walk	Liu Hong; China	45:12.84 PB	Tatyana Shemyakina; Russia	45:34.41	Anamaria Greceanu; Romania	46:45.67 PB
4 × 100 metres relay	United States; Jeneba Tarmoh; Alexandria Anderson; Elizabeth Olear; Gabby Mayo	43.49	France; Johanna Danois; Emilie Gaydu; Joellie Baflan; Céline Distel	44.20	Jamaica; Naffene Briscoe; Anastasia Le-Roy; Carrie Russell; Schillonie Calvert	44.22 SB
4 × 100 metres relay	The American team equalled their winning result from 2004. Calvert won her second bronze medal for Jamaica, having competed on the relay team in 2004 as well. National junior records for Norway and Slovenia as well as a South American junior record by Brazil were established in the heats.					
4 × 400 metres relay	United States; Jessica Beard; Brandi Cross; Sa'de Williams; Nicole Leach	3:29.01 WJL	Nigeria; Folashade Abugan; Ajoke Odumosu; Joy Eze; Sekinat Adesanya	3:30.84 AJ	Jamaica; Latoya McDermott; Sherene Pinnock; Sonita Sutherland; Kaliese Spencer	3:31.62 SB
4 × 400 metres relay	Both Pinnock and Sutherland won relay bronze medals in 2004. The Nigerian team had already set an African junior record in the heats with 3:33.00 minutes after a sprint duel with Jamaica. The final also saw an Asian junior record by the Chinese team in fourth place.					
High jump	Svetlana Radzivil; Uzbekistan	1.91 NJ	Zheng Xingjuan; China	1.88	Annett Engel; Germany; Yekaterina Yevseyeva; Kazakhstan	1.84
High jump	Five athletes, among them a medal favorite Viktoria Leks, ended at 1.84 metres, two of whom shared the podium for the bronze medal.					
Pole vault	Zhou Yang; China	4.30 PB	Tina Šutej; Slovenia	4.25 NJ	Vicky Parnov; Australia	4.20
Pole vault	Reigning champion and favorite Lisa Ryzih exited early in the final after failing all three attempts at her opening height of 4.00 metres. The 2006 world junior leader, Valeriya Volik of Russia, finished fourth.					
Long jump	Rhonda Watkins; Trinidad and Tobago	6.46	Anika Leipold; Germany	6.42	Zhang Yuan; China	6.41
Triple jump	Kaire Leibak; Estonia	14.43 WJL	Sha Li; China	14.01 PB	Liliya Kulyk; Ukraine	14.01 PB
Triple jump	Before the competition Leibak held the world junior leading mark with 13.96 metres, which was improved by Sha Li with 13.97 m in the qualification round. Leibak was in the lead throughout the final, but with 14.05 metres from the fourth round she was threatened by Sha and Kulyk, who both jumped 14.01 m in the fifth round. In the sixth round, however, both challengers failed to improve while Leibak jumped 14.43 metres, only 9 centimetres behind the world junior record. Patrícia Mamona in fourth place established a Portuguese junior record with 13.37 metres; a new Spanish junior record was also set in the final.					
Shot put	Melissa Boekelman; Netherlands	17.66 PB	Denise Hinrichs; Germany	17.35	Irina Tarasova; Russia	17.11 PB
Shot put	The shot put was the first final of the Championships. Simoné du Toit in fourth established a new African junior record with 16.95 metres.					
Discus throw	Dani Samuels; Australia	60.63 WJL	Pan Saili; China	57.40 SB	Tan Jian; China	56.09
Discus throw	With 60.22 metres from the first round, Samuels went unthreatened throughout the competition. Annelies Peetroons in fourth place set a new Belgian junior record.					
Hammer throw	Bianca Perie; Romania	67.38 CR	Anna Bulgakova; Russia	65.73	Hao Shuai; China	64.26
Hammer throw	Perie became the first World Youth champion from 2005 to win a gold medal in Beijing. The new championships record was an improvement of Marina Smolyachkova's 66.81 metres from 2004. Zalina Marghiev of Moldova was in bronze medal position until the final round.					
Javelin throw	Sandra Schaffarzik; Germany	60.45 CR	Vira Rebryk; Ukraine	57.79 NJ	Marharyta Dorozhon; Ukraine	57.68 PB
Javelin throw	Reigning champion Vivian Zimmer, who held the previous championship record with 58.50 metres, finished in seventh place. Like in the men's javelin competition, the winner was never challenged.					
Heptathlon	Tatyana Chernova; Russia	6227 WJL	Ida Marcussen; Norway	6020 NJ	Yana Panteleyeva; Russia	5979
Heptathlon	A close competition for the silver and bronze medals saw Marcussen prevail despite finishing behind Iryna Ilkevych of Ukraine in the 800 metres race. Ilkevych ended in fourth place with a national junior record of 5952 points. The winning score of 5868 from 2004 would only have been good enough for a fifth place in 2006.					
WR world record | AR area record | CR championship record | GR games record | NR national record | OR Olympic record | PB personal best | SB season best | WL world leading (in a given season)

== Medal table ==
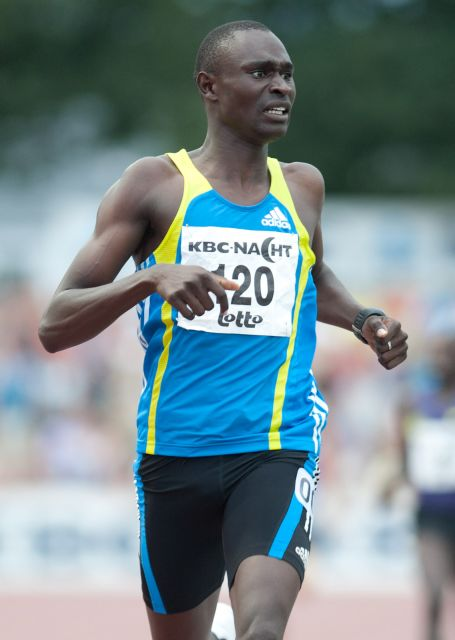
An 800 metres win was the first major title for David Rudisha of Kenya.

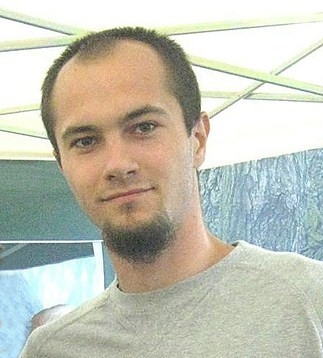
Artur Noga took the 110 metres hurdles gold for Poland.

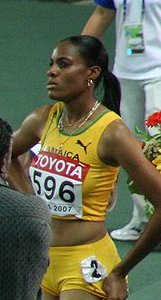
Kaliese Spencer of Jamaica won the 400 metres hurdles.

* Host nation (China)

Rank	Nation	Gold	Silver	Bronze	Total
1	Kenya	6	7	2	15
2	China*	5	5	7	17
3	United States	4	5	2	11
4	Russia	4	3	3	10
5	Estonia	4	0	0	4
6	Jamaica	2	1	5	8
7	Ethiopia	2	1	1	4
8	Australia	2	0	1	3
9	Bulgaria	2	0	0	2
9	Trinidad and Tobago	2	0	0	2
11	Germany	1	2	2	5
12	France	1	2	0	3
13	Romania	1	1	1	3
14	Great Britain	1	0	4	5
15	Poland	1	0	1	2
16	Argentina	1	0	0	1
16	Croatia	1	0	0	1
16	Moldova	1	0	0	1
16	Netherlands	1	0	0	1
16	South Africa	1	0	0	1
16	Uzbekistan	1	0	0	1
22	Canada	0	2	0	2
22	Norway	0	2	0	2
24	Ukraine	0	1	5	6
25	Morocco	0	1	1	2
26	Brazil	0	1	0	1
26	Cuba	0	1	0	1
26	Ecuador	0	1	0	1
26	Egypt	0	1	0	1
26	Finland	0	1	0	1
26	Hungary	0	1	0	1
26	Iran	0	1	0	1
26	Israel	0	1	0	1
26	Nigeria	0	1	0	1
26	Saudi Arabia	0	1	0	1
26	Slovenia	0	1	0	1
37	Bahrain	0	0	2	2
37	Japan	0	0	2	2
39	Greece	0	0	1	1
39	Kazakhstan	0	0	1	1
39	New Zealand	0	0	1	1
39	Slovakia	0	0	1	1
39	Sudan	0	0	1	1
39	Uganda	0	0	1	1
Totals (44 entries)		44	44	45	133

== Participation ==
According to an unofficial count through an unofficial result list, 1350 athletes from 176 countries participated in the event. This is in agreement with the official numbers as published.

- Albania (2)
- Algeria (7)
- American Samoa (1)
- Andorra (1)
- Angola (1)
- Anguilla (1)
- Antigua and Barbuda (1)
- Argentina (4)
- Armenia (1)
- Australia (43)
- Austria (2)
- Azerbaijan (3)
- Bahamas (12)
- Bahrain (7)
- Barbados (5)
- Belarus (24)
- Belgium (11)
- Belize (1)
- Benin (1)
- Bermuda (1)
- Bolivia (1)
- Bosnia and Herzegovina (2)
- Botswana (4)
- Brazil (18)
- British Virgin Islands (1)
- Bulgaria (6)
- Burkina Faso (1)
- Burundi (3)
- Cambodia (1)
- Cameroon (2)
- Canada (28)
- Cayman Islands (4)
- Central African Republic (1)
- Chad (1)
- Chile (3)
- China (76)
- Chinese Taipei (11)
- Colombia (6)
- Comoros (1)
- Congo (1)
- DR Congo (1)
- Cook Islands (1)
- Costa Rica (1)
- Côte d'Ivoire (1)
- Croatia (10)
- Cuba (5)
- Cyprus (4)
- Czech Republic (16)
- Denmark (9)
- Dominica (1)
- Dominican Republic (1)
- Ecuador (3)
- Egypt (3)
- El Salvador (1)
- Eritrea (6)
- Estonia (11)
- Ethiopia (11)
- Fiji (2)
- Finland (29)
- France (46)
- French Polynesia (1)
- Gabon (1)
- Germany (62)
- Gibraltar (1)
- Great Britain (40)
- Greece (17)
- Grenada (1)
- Guatemala (1)
- Guinea-Bissau (1)
- Haiti (1)
- Hong Kong (3)
- Hungary (21)
- India (10)
- Indonesia (1)
- Iran (6)
- Ireland (6)
- Israel (1)
- Italy (33)
- Jamaica (25)
- Japan (37)
- Jordan (1)
- Kazakhstan (7)
- Kenya (21)
- Kiribati (1)
- Kuwait (2)
- Kyrgyzstan (2)
- Laos (1)
- Latvia (10)
- Lesotho (1)
- Liberia (1)
- Lithuania (7)
- Luxembourg (1)
- Macedonia (1)
- Madagascar (1)
- Malaysia (4)
- Maldives (1)
- Mali (2)
- Malta (1)
- Marshall Islands (1)
- Mauritania (1)
- Mauritius (2)
- Mexico (8)
- Federated States of Micronesia (1)
- Moldova (2)
- Monaco (1)
- Mongolia (2)
- Morocco (10)
- Mozambique (1)
- Namibia (5)
- Nauru (1)
- Nepal (1)
- Netherlands (13)
- New Zealand (9)
- Nigeria (12)
- Northern Mariana Islands (1)
- Norway (14)
- Oman (5)
- Pakistan (1)
- Palau (1)
- Palestine (1)
- Panama (1)
- Papua New Guinea (4)
- Paraguay (1)
- Peru (2)
- Philippines (1)
- Poland (30)
- Portugal (6)
- Puerto Rico (3)
- Qatar (5)
- Romania (20)
- Russia (57)
- Rwanda (1)
- Saint Kitts and Nevis (2)
- Saint Lucia (1)
- Saint Vincent and the Grenadines (1)
- Samoa (1)
- San Marino (1)
- Saudi Arabia (10)
- Senegal (4)
- Serbia (7)
- Seychelles (1)
- Sierra Leone (1)
- Singapore (6)
- Slovakia (6)
- Slovenia (15)
- Solomon Islands (1)
- South Africa (30)
- South Korea (8)
- Spain (34)
- Sri Lanka (1)
- Sudan (9)
- Swaziland (1)
- Sweden (19)
- Switzerland (7)
- Syria (2)
- Tajikistan (1)
- Tanzania (2)
- Thailand (7)
- Togo (1)
- Tonga (1)
- Trinidad and Tobago (9)
- Tunisia (4)
- Turkey (10)
- Turkmenistan (1)
- Turks and Caicos Islands (1)
- Uganda (5)
- Ukraine (28)
- United States (71)
- Uruguay (1)
- U.S. Virgin Islands (1)
- Uzbekistan (7)
- Vanuatu (1)
- Venezuela (3)
- Yemen (1)
- Zambia (4)
- Zimbabwe (3)
