= Irina Obedina =

Russian hurdler

Irina Aleksandrovna Obedina (Russian: Ирина Александровна Обедина; born July 1, 1985) is a Russian track and field athlete who specializes in the 400 metres hurdles. Her personal best in the 400 m hurdles is 54.86, achieved at Kazan on July 18, 2008. She also competes in the 400m and 600m, although the hurdles are her primary field.

She competed in the 400 metres hurdles at the 2008 Beijing Olympics where she qualified for the second round with the ninth-fastest overall time of 55.71 seconds.
