= Nicole Leach (hurdler) =

American athlete (born 1987)

Personal information
- Born: 18 July 1987 (age 38) West Philadelphia, United States
- Height: 5 ft 8 in (173 cm)
- Weight: 125 lb (57 kg)

Sport
- Country: United States
- Sport: Track and field
- Event(s): 400 metre hurdles 400 metres
- Club: UCLA
Medal record
Track and field
Representing United States
World Junior Championships
Gold medal – first place	2004 Grosseto	Girls' 4 × 400 m relay
Gold medal – first place	2006 Beijing	Girls' 4 × 400 m relay
Silver medal – second place	2006 Beijing	Girls' 400 m hurdles
Pan American Games
Bronze medal – third place	2007 Rio de Janeiro	Women's 400 m hurdles
Bronze medal – third place	2007 Rio de Janeiro	Women's 4 × 400 m relay

Nicole Leach (born July 18, 1987) is a former American track and field athlete who competed in the 400 metre hurdles and 4 × 400 metre relay events at international level events. Her coach was Jeanette Bolden and Bobby Kersee. Her highest achievement is winning two medals at the 2006 World Junior Championships in Athletics in Beijing.

She is also a three time US Junior champion and two-time NCAA champion in the hurdles. She competed at the following international competitions: 2003 IAAF World Youth Championships in Sherbrooke, Canada; 2004 IAAF World Jr. Championships in Grosseto Italy; 2005 Jr. Pan American Games in Windsor, Canada; 2006 IAAF World Jr. Championships in Beijing, China, 2007 Pan American Games in Rio de Janeiro, where she won two bronze medals and the 2007 IAAF World Championships in Osaka, Japan. Nicole also competed in the 2010 IAAF Continental Cup.
