= 2010 World Junior Championships in Athletics – Women's 4 × 400 metres relay =

The women's 4x400 metres relay event at the 2010 World Junior Championships in Athletics was held in Moncton, New Brunswick, Canada, at Moncton Stadium on 24 and 25 July.

== Medalists ==
Gold	Diamond Dixon; Stacey-Ann Smith; Laura Roesler; Regina George; United States
Silver	Florence Nkiruka; Bukola Abogunloko; Chizoba Okodogbe; Margaret Etim; Nigeria
Bronze	Jody-Ann Muir; Janieve Russell; Natoya Goule; Chris Ann Gordon; Jamaica

== Results ==
=== Final ===
25 July

Rank	Nation	Competitors	Time	Notes
1st place, gold medalist(s)	United States	Diamond Dixon; Stacey-Ann Smith; Laura Roesler; Regina George	3:31.20	
2nd place, silver medalist(s)	Nigeria	Florence Nkiruka; Bukola Abogunloko; Chizoba Okodogbe; Margaret Etim	3:31.84	
3rd place, bronze medalist(s)	Jamaica	Jody-Ann Muir; Janieve Russell; Natoya Goule; Chris Ann Gordon	3:32.24	
4	Bahamas	Rashan Brown; Amara Jones; Katrina Seymour; Shaunae Miller	3:33.43	
5	Canada	Katherine Reid; Annie Leblanc; Carly Paracholski; Chanice Chase	3:35.08	
6	Russia	Alisa Matyash; Vera Rudakova; Ayvika Malanova; Maria Lebedeva	3:36.94	
7	Germany	Lisa Hofmann; Julia Schaefers; Lena Menzel; Christina Zwirner	3:40.29	
8	Poland	Magdalena Gorzkowska; Małgorzata Hołub; Joanna Jóźwik; Martyna Opoń	3:42.70	

=== Heats ===
24 July

==== Heat 1 ====
Rank	Nation	Competitors	Time	Notes
1	Canada	Katherine Reid; Annie Leblanc; Carly Paracholski; Chanice Chase	3:34.50	Q
2	United States	Sanura Eley-O'Reilly; Diamond Dixon; Laura Roesler; Briana Nelson	3:35.26	Q
3	Russia	Alina Safiullina; Alisa Matyash; Ayvika Malanova; Maria Lebedeva	3:35.66	Q
4	Poland	Magdalena Gorzkowska; Małgorzata Hołub; Justyna Święty; Joanna Jóźwik	3:38.96	q
5	Trinidad and Tobago	Shawna Fermin; Gabriela Cumberbatch; Jessica James; Alena Brooks	3:40.15	
6	Italy	Marta Maffioletti; Valentina Zappa; Monica Lazzara; Giulia Latini	3:43.69	
7	Belarus	Iryna Andrykevich; Agata Klimovich; Halina Amialiashchyk; Yuliya Yurenia	3:45.03	
8	Japan	Miho Shingu; Kana Ichikawa; Shiori Miki; Manami Mashita	3:50.65	

==== Heat 2 ====
Rank	Nation	Competitors	Time	Notes
1	Jamaica	Danielle Dowie; Janieve Russell; Natoya Goule; Chris Ann Gordon	3:32.30	Q
2	Bahamas	Katrina Seymour; Amara Jones; Rashan Brown; Shaunae Miller	3:33.50	Q
3	Nigeria	Charity Ibe; Chizoba Okodogbe; Florence Nkiruka; Blessing Mayungbe	3:34.81	Q
4	Germany	Lena Menzel; Julia Schaefers; Malena Richter; Christina Zwirner	3:37.99	q
5	Australia	Caitlin Sargent; Louise Maybury; Shannon Smith; Anneliese Rubie	3:39.64	
6	Sweden	Ewa Marcinkiewicz; Elin Moraiti; Vendela Mindelöf; Sandra Wagner	3:44.19	
	Romania	Sanda Belgyan; Elena Mirela Lavric; Adelina Pastor; Bianca Răzor	DQ	IAAF rule 163.3

== Participation ==
According to an unofficial count, 68 athletes from 15 countries participated in the event.

- Australia (4)
- Bahamas (4)
- Belarus (4)
- Canada (4)
- Germany (5)
- Italy (4)
- Jamaica (5)
- Japan (4)
- Nigeria (6)
- Poland (5)
- Romania (4)
- Russia (5)
- Sweden (4)
- Trinidad and Tobago (4)
- United States (6)
