= Athletics at the 2014 Commonwealth Games – Women's 4 × 400 metres relay =

Women's 4 × 400 metres relay at the Commonwealth Games

The Women's 4 × 400 metres relay at the 2014 Commonwealth Games, as part of the athletics programme, took place at Hampden Park on 1 and 2 August 2014.

== Heats ==
=== Heat 1 ===
Rank	Nation	Members	Result	Notes	Qual.
1	Jamaica	Christine Day; Anastasia Le-Roy; Janieve Russell; Shericka Williams	3:28.29		Q
2	Australia	Anneliese Rubie; Caitlin Sargent; Jess Gulli; Lyndsay Pekin	3:32.40		Q
3	Trinidad and Tobago	Shawna Fermin; Domonique Williams; Janeil Bellille; Romona Modeste	3:33.26		Q
4	Scotland	Kirsten McAslan; Diane Ramsay; Gemma Nicol; Zoey Clark	3:33.91		
5	Kenya	Jacinter Shakanda; Koki Manunga; Florence Wasike; Maureen Jelaghat Maiyo	3:37.45		
6	Papua New Guinea	Donna Koniel; Toea Wisil; Sharon Kwarula; Betty Burua	3:46.26		
7	Uganda	DNS			

=== Heat 2 ===
Rank	Nation	Members	Result	Notes	Qual.
1	England	Emily Diamond; Shana Cox; Margaret Adeoye; Christine Ohuruogu	3:27.88		Q
2	Nigeria	Oluwafunke Oladoye; Omolara Omotosho; Regina George; Ada Benjamin	3:28.28		Q
3	Canada	Audrey Jean-Baptiste; Wendy Fawn Dorr; Noelle Montcalm; Chanice Chase	3:31.02		Q
4	Bahamas	Christine Amertil; Shakeitha Henfield; Miriam Byfield; Lanece Clarke	3:31.91		q
5	India	Debashree Mazumdar; Tintu Lukka; Ashwini Akkunji; Poovamma Marchettira	3:33.67		q
6	New Zealand	Portia Bing; Brooke Cull; Zoe Ballantyne; Louise Jones	3:34.62		
7	Sierra Leone	DNS			

== Final ==
Rank	Nation	Members	Result	Notes
1st place, gold medalist(s)	Jamaica	Christine Day; Novlene Williams-Mills; Anastasia Le-Roy; Stephanie McPherson	3:23.82	GR
2nd place, silver medalist(s)	Nigeria	Patience Okon George; Regina George; Ada Benjamin; Folashade Abugan	3:24.71	
3rd place, bronze medalist(s)	England	Christine Ohuruogu; Shana Cox; Kelly Massey; Anyika Onuora	3:27.24	
4	Australia	Anneliese Rubie; Caitlin Sargent; Lauren Wells; Morgan Mitchell	3:30.27	
5	Canada	Audrey Jean-Baptiste; Wendy Fawn Dorr; Noelle Montcalm; Chanice Chase	3:32.45	
6	Trinidad and Tobago	Shawna Fermin; Domonique Williams; Janeil Bellille; Romona Modeste	3:33.50	
7	Bahamas	Christine Amertil; Shaunae Miller; Lanece Clarke; Miriam Byfield	3:34.86	
8	India	Poovamma Machettira; Tintu Lukka; Ratandeep Kaur; Anilda Thomas	DQ	
