= 2010 World Junior Championships in Athletics – Women's 400 metres =

The women's 400 metres event at the 2010 World Junior Championships in Athletics was held in Moncton, New Brunswick, Canada, at Moncton Stadium on 20, 21 and 22 July.

== Medalists ==
| Gold | Shaunae Miller; Bahamas |
| Silver | Margaret Etim; Nigeria |
| Bronze | Bianca Răzor; Romania |

== Results ==
=== Final ===
22 July

| Rank | Name | Nationality | Time | Notes |
|---|---|---|---|---|
| 1st place, gold medalist(s) | Shaunae Miller | Bahamas | 52.52 | |
| 2nd place, silver medalist(s) | Margaret Etim | Nigeria | 53.05 | |
| 3rd place, bronze medalist(s) | Bianca Răzor | Romania | 53.17 | |
| 4 | Stacey-Ann Smith | United States | 53.42 | |
| 5 | Jody-Ann Muir | Jamaica | 53.42 | |
| 6 | Bukola Abogunloko | Nigeria | 53.74 | |
| 7 | Regina George | United States | 53.83 | |
| 8 | Chantel Malone | British Virgin Islands | 53.91 | |

=== Semifinals ===
21 July

==== Semifinal 1 ====
| Rank | Name | Nationality | Time | Notes |
|---|---|---|---|---|
| 1 | Bukola Abogunloko | Nigeria | 52.86 | Q |
| 2 | Bianca Răzor | Romania | 53.06 | Q |
| 3 | Jody-Ann Muir | Jamaica | 53.20 | q |
| 4 | Regina George | United States | 53.59 | q |
| 5 | Anneliese Rubie | Australia | 54.39 | |
| 6 | Gulustan Mahmood | Iraq | 54.70 | |
| 7 | Christina Zwirner | Germany | 54.86 | |
| 8 | Miho Shingu | Japan | 55.66 | |

==== Semifinal 2 ====
| Rank | Name | Nationality | Time | Notes |
|---|---|---|---|---|
| 1 | Margaret Etim | Nigeria | 52.63 | Q |
| 2 | Shaunae Miller | Bahamas | 53.21 | Q |
| 3 | Bárbara de Oliveira | Brazil | 53.60 | |
| 4 | Ella Räsänen | Finland | 53.73 | |
| 5 | Katherine Reid | Canada | 53.80 | |
| 6 | Sade Sealy | Barbados | 54.90 | |
| 7 | Julia Schaefers | Germany | 55.09 | |
| | Yuliya Yurenia | Belarus | DQ | IAAF rule 162.7 |

==== Semifinal 3 ====
| Rank | Name | Nationality | Time | Notes |
|---|---|---|---|---|
| 1 | Chantel Malone | British Virgin Islands | 53.37 | Q |
| 2 | Stacey-Ann Smith | United States | 53.48 | Q |
| 3 | Chanice Chase | Canada | 53.72 | |
| 4 | Maria Lebedeva | Russia | 53.86 | |
| 5 | Rashan Brown | Bahamas | 54.14 | |
| 6 | Adelina Pastor | Romania | 54.47 | |
| 7 | Janieve Russell | Jamaica | 55.16 | |
| 8 | Marta Maffioletti | Italy | 55.72 | |

=== Heats ===
20 July

==== Heat 1 ====
| Rank | Name | Nationality | Time | Notes |
|---|---|---|---|---|
| 1 | Maria Lebedeva | Russia | 54.02 | Q |
| 2 | Regina George | United States | 54.17 | Q |
| 3 | Janieve Russell | Jamaica | 54.65 | Q |
| 4 | Yuliya Yurenia | Belarus | 54.67 | Q |
| 5 | Rashan Brown | Bahamas | 54.85 | q |
| 6 | Sandra Wagner | Sweden | 55.28 | |
| 7 | Shawna Fermin | Trinidad and Tobago | 55.50 | |
| 8 | Romana Tea Kirinic | Croatia | 56.27 | |

==== Heat 2 ====
| Rank | Name | Nationality | Time | Notes |
|---|---|---|---|---|
| 1 | Bukola Abogunloko | Nigeria | 53.38 | Q |
| 2 | Stacey-Ann Smith | United States | 53.41 | Q |
| 3 | Chanice Chase | Canada | 53.61 | Q |
| 4 | Adelina Pastor | Romania | 53.74 | Q |
| 5 | Christina Zwirner | Germany | 54.57 | q |
| 6 | Deseree King | U.S. Virgin Islands | 56.73 | |
| 7 | Hristina Risteska | North Macedonia | 58.80 | |
| 8 | Kristie Baillie | New Zealand | 59.98 | |

==== Heat 3 ====
| Rank | Name | Nationality | Time | Notes |
|---|---|---|---|---|
| 1 | Shaunae Miller | Bahamas | 52.45 | Q |
| 2 | Margaret Etim | Nigeria | 52.48 | Q |
| 3 | Ella Räsänen | Finland | 53.87 | Q |
| 4 | Anneliese Rubie | Australia | 54.29 | Q |
| 5 | Miho Shingu | Japan | 54.79 | q |
| 6 | Liona Rebernik | Slovenia | 55.60 | |
| 7 | Ashley Kelly | British Virgin Islands | 55.71 | |

==== Heat 4 ====
| Rank | Name | Nationality | Time | Notes |
|---|---|---|---|---|
| 1 | Chantel Malone | British Virgin Islands | 52.97 | Q |
| 2 | Bárbara de Oliveira | Brazil | 53.35 | Q |
| 3 | Katherine Reid | Canada | 54.48 | Q |
| 4 | Marta Maffioletti | Italy | 54.98 | Q |
| 5 | Sparkle McKnight | Trinidad and Tobago | 55.01 | |
| 6 | Liliana Núñez | Ecuador | 56.30 | |
| 7 | Kanika Beckles | Grenada | 58.95 | |

==== Heat 5 ====
| Rank | Name | Nationality | Time | Notes |
|---|---|---|---|---|
| 1 | Jody-Ann Muir | Jamaica | 53.83 | Q |
| 2 | Bianca Răzor | Romania | 53.85 | Q |
| 3 | Gulustan Mahmood | Iraq | 54.62 | Q |
| 4 | Julia Schaefers | Germany | 54.65 | Q |
| 5 | Sade Sealy | Barbados | 54.88 | q |
| 6 | Elin Moraiti | Sweden | 55.95 | |
| 7 | Malama Dosso | France | 56.40 | |
| 8 | Francesca Xuereb | Malta | 56.61 | |

== Participation ==
According to an unofficial count, 38 athletes from 28 countries participated in the event.

- Australia (1)
- Bahamas (2)
- Barbados (1)
- Belarus (1)
- Brazil (1)
- British Virgin Islands (2)
- Canada (2)
- Croatia (1)
- Ecuador (1)
- Finland (1)
- France (1)
- Germany (2)
- Grenada (1)
- Iraq (1)
- Italy (1)
- Jamaica (2)
- Japan (1)
- North Macedonia (1)
- Malta (1)
- New Zealand (1)
- Nigeria (2)
- Romania (2)
- Russia (1)
- Slovenia (1)
- Sweden (2)
- Trinidad and Tobago (2)
- United States (2)
- U.S. Virgin Islands (1)
