= Athletics at the 2011 Summer Universiade – Women's 400 metres =

The women's 400 metres event at the 2011 Summer Universiade was held on 11–13 August.

== Medalists ==
Gold	Silver	Bronze
Olga Topilskaya; Russia	Yelena Migunova; Russia	Diamond Dixon; United States

Note: Olga Tereshkova originally finished third but was later caught doping and her results were cancelled.

== Results ==
=== Heats ===
Qualification: First 4 in each heat and 4 best performers advance to the Semifinals.

Rank	Heat	Name	Nationality	Time	Notes
1	5	Yelena Migunova	Russia	52.13	Q, SB
2	3	Olga Topilskaya	Russia	53.14	Q
3	3	Meliz Redif	Turkey	53.46	Q
3	5	Caitlin Sargent	Australia	53.46	Q
5	5	Jenna Martin	Canada	53.56	Q
6	1	Anita Banović	Croatia	53.61	Q
7	1	Amonn Nelson	Canada	53.62	Q
8	2	Diamond Dixon	United States	53.67	Q
9	1	Pınar Saka	Turkey	53.93	Q
10	1	Aauri Bokesa	Spain	53.94	Q
11	5	Shelise Williams	United States	54.32	Q
12	4	Zheng Zhihui	China	54.37	Q
13	3	Chen Jingwen	China	54.38	Q
13	4	Kelly Massey	Great Britain	54.38	Q
15	4	Agnė Orlauskaitė	Lithuania	54.46	Q
16	2	Maris Mägi	Estonia	54.49	Q
16	4	Liona Rebernik	Slovenia	54.49	q
16	1	Alet van Wyk	South Africa	54.49	q, SB
19	2	Anneliese Rubie	Australia	54.86	Q
20	2	Rorisang Ramonnye	South Africa	54.96	Q
21	5	Lydia Mashila	Botswana	54.99	q, SB
22	3	Fatou Diabaye	Senegal	55.50	Q, SB
23	3	Violeta Metodieva	Bulgaria	55.64	q
24	2	Margarita Kudinova	Kazakhstan	56.18	
25	3	Treewadee Vongphan	Thailand	56.45	
26	5	Fatoumata Diop	Senegal	56.65	
27	4	Arviena Vis	Netherlands Antilles	57.62	
28	2	Randi Kjerstad	Norway	57.85	
29	2	Leong Kaman	Macau	58.78	
30	1	Deeann Rogers	Anguilla	58.95	PB
31	1	Viviana Efua Dansowaa	Ghana	59.84	
32	4	Silvana Zuñiga	Peru	1:00.43	
33	5	Valerie Seema Pereira	Singapore	1:00.76	
34	5	Carolyne Waithra Njeri	Kenya	1:06.07	
	3	Mwiya Muyatwa	Zambia	DQ	Lane infr.
	4	Olga Tereshkova	Kazakhstan	DQ	Doping

=== Semifinals ===
Official Semifinals Video

Qualification: First 2 of each semifinal (Q) and the next 2 fastest (q) qualified for the final.

Rank	Heat	Name	Nationality	Time	Notes
1	1	Yelena Migunova	Russia	52.03	Q, SB
2	3	Olga Topilskaya	Russia	52.20	Q
3	2	Maris Mägi	Estonia	52.88	Q
4	2	Diamond Dixon	United States	52.97	Q
4	1	Jenna Martin	Canada	52.97	Q
6	3	Amonn Nelson	Canada	53.06	q
7	1	Caitlin Sargent	Australia	53.24	q
8	1	Meliz Redif	Turkey	53.38	
9	3	Pınar Saka	Turkey	53.41	
10	3	Shelise Williams	United States	53.56	
11	2	Anita Banović	Croatia	53.57	
12	2	Zheng Zhihui	China	53.72	
13	1	Chen Jingwen	China	53.86	
14	3	Kelly Massey	Great Britain	53.92	
15	2	Aauri Bokesa	Spain	54.09	
16	1	Agnė Orlauskaitė	Lithuania	54.51	
17	1	Violeta Metodieva	Bulgaria	54.62	
18	1	Rorisang Ramonnye	South Africa	54.71	
19	2	Liona Rebernik	Slovenia	54.81	
20	2	Alet van Wyk	South Africa	55.03	
21	3	Lydia Mashila	Botswana	55.06	
22	3	Fatou Diabaye	Senegal	55.81	
	3	Olga Tereshkova	Kazakhstan	DQ	Doping
	2	Anneliese Rubie	Australia	DNS	

=== Final ===
Official Video

Rank	Lane	Name	Nationality	Time	Notes
1st place, gold medalist(s)	4	Olga Topilskaya	Russia	51.63	
2nd place, silver medalist(s)	3	Yelena Migunova	Russia	51.77	SB
3rd place, bronze medalist(s)	7	Diamond Dixon	United States	52.76	
4	2	Amonn Nelson	Canada	52.98	
5	8	Jenna Martin	Canada	53.11	
6	1	Caitlin Sargent	Australia	53.29	
7	6	Maris Mägi	Estonia	53.92	
	5	Olga Tereshkova	Kazakhstan	DQ	Doping
