= Athletics at the 2014 Commonwealth Games – Women's 400 metres hurdles =

Women's 400 metres hurdles at the Commonwealth Games

The Women's 400 metres hurdles at the 2014 Commonwealth Games, as part of the athletics programme, took place at Hampden Park between 29 and 31 July 2014.

== Results ==
=== Preliminaries ===
==== Heat 1 ====
Rank	Order	Name	Result	Notes	Qualified
1	5	Eilidh Child (SCO)	55.56		Q
2	7	Chanice Chase (CAN)	57.23		Q
3	2	Nikita Tracey (JAM)	57.63		
4	6	Lyndsay Pekin (AUS)	57.92		
5	1	Ese Okoro (ENG)	57.99		
6	4	Katrina Seymour (BAH)	1:01.34		
DQ	3	Josanne Lucas (TRI)	-		

==== Heat 2 ====
Rank	Order	Name	Result	Notes	Qualified
1	4	Janieve Russell (JAM)	56.18		Q
2	7	Wenda Theron (RSA)	56.38		Q
3	2	Noelle Montcalm (CAN)	56.72		q
4	8	Christine McMahon (NIR)	58.67		
5	6	Ashwini Akkunji (IND)	58.75		
6	3	Rashidatu Abubakar (GHA)	1:00.94	PB	
7	1	Sharon Kwarula (PNG)	1:02.52		
DQ	5	Hayley McLean (ENG)	-		

==== Heat 3 ====
Rank	Order	Name	Result	Notes	Qualified
1	1	Kaliese Spencer (JAM)	55.45		Q
2	3	Lauren Wells (AUS)	55.79		Q
3	2	Amaka Ogoegbunam (NGR)	56.85		q
4	4	Janeil Bellille (TRI)	57.51		
5	5	Laura Wake (ENG)	58.29		
6	7	Sonali Merrill Christine (SRI)	58.65		
7	6	Florence Wasike (KEN)	59.29		

=== Final ===
Rank	Order	Name	Result	Notes
1st place, gold medalist(s)	3	Kaliese Spencer (JAM)	54.10	
2nd place, silver medalist(s)	6	Eilidh Child (SCO)	55.02	
3rd place, bronze medalist(s)	4	Janieve Russell (JAM)	55.64	
4	5	Lauren Wells (AUS)	56.09	
5	2	Noelle Montcalm (CAN)	56.74	
−	8	Chanice Chase (CAN)	DNF	
−	1	Amaka Ogoegbunam (NGR)	DQ	
−	7	Wenda Theron (RSA)	DQ	
