= Geno Jones =

Bahamian sprinter (born 1992)

Medal record

Athletics

Representing Bahamas

CARIFTA Games Junior (U20)
Gold medal – first place	2010 George Town	100 m
Bronze medal – third place	2010 George Town	4x100 m relay

CARIFTA Games Youth (U17)
Gold medal – first place	2008 Basseterre	4x100 m relay
Gold medal – first place	2008 Basseterre	100 m

Geno Jones Jr (born July 24, 1992) is a Bahamian sprinter from Grand Bahama who mainly competes in the 100m. He attended Bishop Michael Eldon School before competing for the LSU Tigers track and field and later played American football at Holland College in Canada as a running back.

His personal best of 10.42 seconds was run in Freeport, Bahamas, at the G.B.S.S.A.A Championships, aka "Island Sports", where he won gold. He won double gold in the under 17 100 m and 4 × 100 m relay at the 2008 Carifta Games in Saint Kitts and Nevis. He also won the under 20 boys 100 m at the 2010 Carifta Games in the Cayman Islands. He competed at the IAAF World U18 Championships and IAAF World U20 Championships without making the final in the 100 m.

== Personal bests ==
Event	Time	Venue	Date
100 m	10.42 (+1.9)	Freeport, Bahamas	March 13, 2010
200 m	21.49 (0.0)	Baton Rouge, Louisiana	April 2, 2011
60m m	6.81 (indoor)	Baton Rouge, Louisiana	March 4, 2011
