= Janieve Russell =

Jamaican track and field athlete

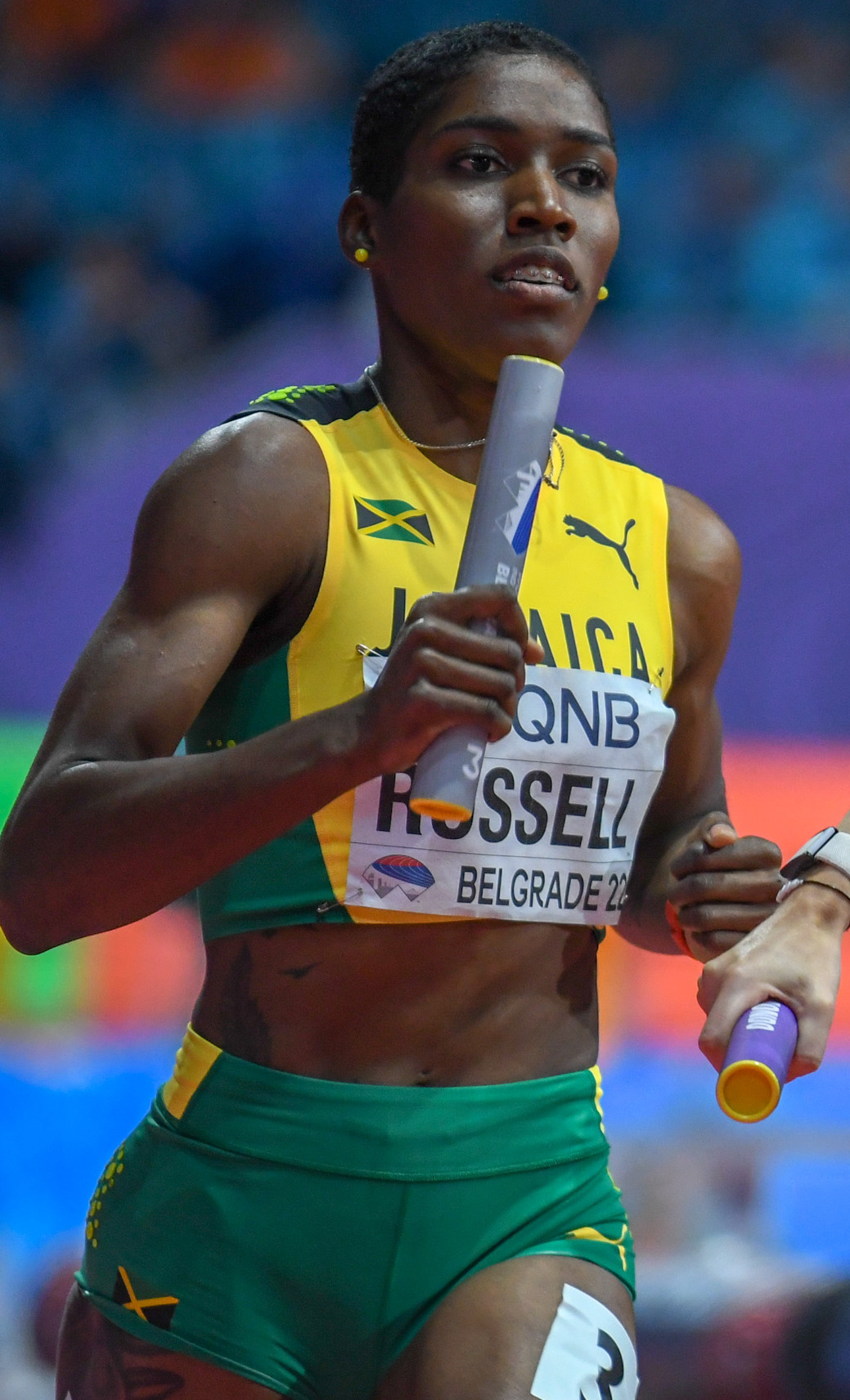
- Russell at the 2022 World Athletics Indoor Championships

Personal information
- Born: 14 November 1993 (age 32) Manchester Parish, Jamaica
- Height: 1.75 m (5 ft 9 in)
- Weight: 64 kg (141 lb)

Sport
- Country: Jamaica
- Sport: Track and field
- Event: 400 m hurdles
- Club: MVP Track & Field Club
- Coached by: Stephen Francis
Medal record
Women's athletics
Representing Jamaica
Olympic Games
Bronze medal – third place	2020 Tokyo	4 × 400 m relay
World Championships
Silver medal – second place	2019 Doha	4 × 400 m mixed
Silver medal – second place	2022 Eugene	4 × 400 m relay
Silver medal – second place	2023 Budapest	4 × 400 m relay
World Indoor Championships
Gold medal – first place	2022 Belgrade	4 × 400 m relay
World Relays
Bronze medal – third place	2017 Nassau	4 × 400 m relay
Commonwealth Games
Gold medal – first place	2014 Glasgow	4 × 400 m relay
Gold medal – first place	2018 Gold Coast	400 m hurdles
Gold medal – first place	2018 Gold Coast	4 × 400 m relay
Gold medal – first place	2022 Birmingham	400 m hurdles
Bronze medal – third place	2014 Glasgow	400 m hurdles
NACAC Championships
Silver medal – second place	2018 Toronto	400 m hurdles
Silver medal – second place	2022 Freeport	400 m hurdles
Silver medal – second place	2022 Freeport	4 × 400 m relay
Diamond League
Third place	2022 Zurich	400 mh
Continental Cup
Gold medal – first place	2018 Ostrava	400 m hurdles
World Junior Championships
Gold medal – first place	2012 Barcelona	400 m hurdles
Silver medal – second place	2012 Barcelona	4 × 400 m relay
Bronze medal – third place	2010 Moncton	4 × 400 m relay
Pan American Junior Championships
Silver medal – second place	2012 Miramar	Heptathlon
Central American and Caribbean Junior Championships
Gold medal – first place	2010 Santo Domingo	4 × 400 m relay
Silver medal – second place	2010 Santo Domingo	400 m

Janieve Russell (born 14 November 1993) is a Jamaican track and field athlete who competes mainly in the 400 metres hurdles and the 400 metres sprint. She won an Olympic bronze medal in the 4 × 400 m relay in Tokyo 2021, where she also finished fourth in the 400 m hurdles final in a personal best of 53.08 secs. She is a four-time Commonwealth Games gold medallist, winning the 400 m hurdles title in 2018 and 2022, and the 4 × 400 m relay in 2014 and 2018. She has also won two relay silvers at the World Championships and a relay gold at the World Indoor Championships.

Russell was highly successful as a youth and junior level athlete. She was a nine-time gold medallist at the CARIFTA Games and a double gold medallist at the 2012 World Junior Championships in Athletics, winning the 400 metres hurdles and the 4 × 400 m relay. She also won a relay medal at the 2010 World Junior Championships in Athletics.

== Career ==
=== Early life and career ===
Born in Manchester, Jamaica, she attended Holmwood Technical High School in Christiana and competed in a variety of track and field events while there. She was in the top three of both the high jump and long jump at the Jamaican High School Championships in 2008 and made her international debut shortly after, taking the under-17 long jump silver at the 2008 CARIFTA Games. She returned at the 2009 CARIFTA Games and won that title, setting a personal best of 6.06 m (19 ft 10 1/2 in) in the process. At the competition she was also the high jump bronze medallist, double gold medallist in the 4 × 100 and 4 × 400 metres relays, and set a games record in the 300 metres hurdles as well. She was among the contenders in the long jump at the 2009 World Youth Championships in Athletics, but was twenty centimetres off her best in the final and finished in ninth place.

Expanding her oeuvre, in 2010 Russell placed in the top three at the Jamaican High School in the 100 metres hurdles as well as her long jump speciality. Taking in combined track and field events, she entered the pentathlon at the 2010 CARIFTA Games and won by a margin of nearly 400 points. She still entered the long jump individually, and placed fourth. The Jamaican junior championships saw her win a long jump/400 metres sprint double. International junior medals followed at the 2010 Central American and Caribbean Junior Championships, where the 16-year-old Russell took the 400 m silver medal win a personal best of 53.68 seconds and helped the Jamaican 4 × 400 metres relay team to the gold medals. She was selected for the same events at the 2010 World Junior Championships in Athletics. Although she was a little slower in the 400 m individual event, being eliminated in the semi-finals, she won a medal with the Jamaican team, which ran its fastest time of the year (3:32.24 minutes) to claim the bronze medals. She competed internationally in her fourth different event of the season, choosing the long jump for the 2010 Youth Olympics and placing seventh in the competition.

The 2011 season saw Russell set personal bests in all the disciplines she competed in, bar the jumps. She focused on the 400 metres hurdles at the start of the year, which culminated in a victory in the under-19 section of the 2011 CARIFTA Games in a personal best of 57.71 seconds. She also won relay gold with the Jamaican team at the competition. In May she ran track bests of 24.10 seconds for the 200 metres and 53.55 seconds for the 400 m. In June she won her first senior title at the Jamaican Athletics Championships, winning the heptathlon with a personal best score of 5361 points, including a javelin throw best of 33.96 m (111 ft 5 in) and an 800 metres best of 2:18.47 minutes to finish the competition. The 2011 Pan American Junior Athletics Championships was the biggest international event of her season and she finished with a heptathlon silver medal behind Brazil's Tamara de Sousa, setting bests in the shot put and 100 metres hurdles along the way.

=== World Junior champion ===
Russell began to specialise more in the hurdles in 2012. She repeated her hurdles/relay double at the 2012 CARIFTA Games and was also the long jump runner-up. Her season focused on the 2012 World Junior Championships in Athletics. She entered as the world leader in the 400 m hurdles through her new best of 57.04 seconds at the national championships in June. She was dominant at the competition and won the gold medal by a margin of over a second, setting a new best time of 56.62 seconds. This made her the second Jamaican woman to win the title, following in the footsteps of Kaliese Spencer She then anchored the Jamaican 4 × 400 m relay team to the silver medals behind the American team.

=== Senior career ===
Having finished her junior career, she gained an athletic scholarship to study at the University of Technology, Jamaica – an institution with a prominent sports programme. She continued to focus on the 400 m hurdles, setting a new best of 56.30 seconds in 2013, and began training in the event under Stephen Francis at the MVP Track Club. She markedly improved her performances in 2014. She knocked over a second and a half off her 400 m sprint best, running a time of 51.49 seconds in Kingston in June. At the Jamaican Championships she was runner-up i the 400 m hurdles to the Kaliese Spencer, the top Jamaican and training partner. Russell's time of 54.75 seconds was almost a second improvement on her previous best.

She was chosen to compete at the 2014 Commonwealth Games (her first senior selection) and she came away with a bronze medal in the 400 m hurdles, finishing behind Spencer and host nation athlete Eilidh Child. She ran in the heats of the 4 × 400 m relay and though she was replaced in the final, the team won the gold medals.

== Personal bests ==
- 400 metres hurdles – 53.08 sec (2021)
- 200 metres – 23.43 sec (2018)
- 400 metres – 50.76 sec (2023)
- 800 metres – 2:11.5h min (2015)
- 100 metres hurdles – 13.80 sec (2012)
- 300 metres hurdles – 41.30 sec (2009)
- High jump – 1.80 m (5 ft 10 3/4 in) (2009)
- Long jump – 6.20 m (20 ft 4 in) (2010)
- Shot put – 10.86 m (35 ft 7 1/2 in) (2011)
- Javelin throw – 33.96 m (111 ft 5 in) (2011)
- Pentathlon – 3825 points (2010)
- Heptathlon – 5361 points (2011)

== International competition record ==
Year	Competition	Venue	Position	Event	Notes
Representing Jamaica
2009	World Youth Championships	Brixen, Italy	9th	Long jump	5.86 m
2010	Central American and Caribbean Junior Championships (U-20)	Santo Domingo, Dominican Republic	2nd	400 m	53.68
2010	Central American and Caribbean Junior Championships (U-20)	Santo Domingo, Dominican Republic	1st	4 × 400 m relay	3:34.41
2010	World Junior Championships	Moncton, New Brunswick, Canada	21st (sf)	400 m	55.16
2010	World Junior Championships	Moncton, New Brunswick, Canada	3rd	4 × 400 m relay	3:32.24
2010	Youth Olympics	Singapore	7th	Long jump	5.83 m
2011	Pan American Junior Championships	Miramar, United States	2nd	Heptathlon	5352 pts
2012	World Junior Championships	Barcelona, Spain	1st	400 m hurdles	56.62
2012	World Junior Championships	Barcelona, Spain	2nd	4 × 400 m relay	3:32.97
2014	Commonwealth Games	Glasgow, United Kingdom	3rd	400 m hurdles	55.64
2014	Commonwealth Games	Glasgow, United Kingdom	1st	4 × 400 m relay	3:28.29 †
2015	World Championships	Beijing, China	5th	400 m hurdles	54.65
2016	Olympic Games	Rio de Janeiro, Brazil	5th	400 m hurdles	54.15
2017	World Relays	Nassau, Bahamas	3rd	4 × 400 m relay	3:28.49
2018	World Indoor Championships	Birmingham, United Kingdom	2nd (h)	4 × 400 m relay	3:32.01^{1}
2018	Commonwealth Games	Gold Coast, Australia	1st	400 m hurdles	54.33
2018	Commonwealth Games	Gold Coast, Australia	1st	4 × 400 m relay	3:24.00
2018	NACAC Championships	Toronto, Canada	2nd	400 m hurdles	53.81
2019	World Relays	Yokohama, Japan	5th	4 × 400 m relay	3:28.30
2021	Olympic Games	Tokyo, Japan	4th	400 m hurdles	53.08
2021	Olympic Games	Tokyo, Japan	3rd	4 × 400 m relay	3:21.24
2022	World Indoor Championships	Belgrade, Serbia	1st	4 × 400 m relay	3:28.40
2022	World Championships	Eugene, United States	14th (sf)	400 m hurdles	54.66
2022	World Championships	Eugene, United States	2nd	4 × 400 m relay	3:20.74
2022	NACAC Championships	Freeport, Bahamas	2nd	400 m hurdles	54.87
2022	NACAC Championships	Freeport, Bahamas	2nd	4 × 400 m relay	3:26.32
2023	World Championships	Budapest, Hungary	7th	400 m hurdles	54.28
2023	World Championships	Budapest, Hungary	2nd	4 × 400 m relay	3:20.88
2024	Olympic Games	Paris, France	12th (sf)	400 m hurdles	54.65
2025	NACAC Championships	Freeport, Bahamas	7th	400 m hurdles	56.58

- † = Competed in the heats of the relay only.

^{1}Disqualified in the final

National titles

- Heptathlon: 2010
- 400 meter hurdles: 2015
