= 2010 CARIFTA Games =

XXXIX CARIFTA Games
- Dates: April 3–5
- Host city: George Town, Cayman Islands
- Venue: Truman Bodden Sports Complex
- Level: Junior and Youth
- Events: 66 (35 junior (incl. 5 open), 31 youth (incl. 1 exhibition))
- Participation: about 427 (234 junior, 193 youth) athletes from 24 nations
- Records set: 13 games records

The 39th CARIFTA Games was held in the Truman Bodden Sports Complex in George Town, Cayman Islands, on April 3–5, 2010. A detailed report on the results was given.

== Records ==
In total, 13 new games records were set.

Event	Record	Athlete	Country	Type
Boys Under 20 (Junior)
400 m	45.02s	Kirani James	Grenada	CR
5000 m	14:34.34	Kemoy Campbell	Jamaica	CR
110 m hurdles	13.41s (1.3 m/s)	Jehue Gordon	Trinidad and Tobago	CR
400 m hurdles	49.76s	Jehue Gordon	Trinidad and Tobago	CR
Shot put	18.67m	Quincy Wilson	Trinidad and Tobago	CR
Discus throw	63.11m	Chad Wright	Jamaica	CR
Girls Under 20 (Junior)
100 m hurdles	13.42s (0.5 m/s)	Samantha Elliot	Jamaica	CR
Boys Under 17 (Youth)
200 m	20.84s (1.2 m/s)	Odean Skeen	Jamaica	CR
400 m hurdles	52.75s	Stephen Newbold	Bahamas	CR
Shot put	16.99m	Chadrick Decosta	Jamaica	CR
Discus throw	52.99m	Fedrick Dacres	Jamaica	CR
Girls Under 17 (Youth)
High jump	1.85m	Akela Jones	Barbados	CR
400 m	53.36s	Shaunae Miller	Bahamas	CR

Key

AR — Area record • CR — Championship record • NR — National record

== Austin Sealy Award ==
The Austin Sealy Trophy for the most outstanding athlete of the games was awarded to Jehue Gordon of Trinidad and Tobago. He won two gold medals in the 110 m hurdles and the 400 m hurdles competition in the junior (U-20) category setting new games record in both events, and a bronze medal with the 4 × 400 m relay team of Trinidad and Tobago.

== Medal summary ==
Medal winners and complete results can be found on the CFPI Timing website, and on the World Junior Athletics History website.

=== Boys under 20 (Junior) ===
Event	Gold		Silver		Bronze	
100 metres (0.8 m/s)	Geno Jones (BAH)	10.44	Jason Rogers (SKN)	10.48	Trevorvano Mackey (BAH)	10.50
200 metres (0.8 m/s)	Kirani James (GRN)	20.76	Rachmil van Lamoen (AHO)	20.90	Shekeim Greaves (BAR)	21.29
400 metres	Kirani James (GRN)	45.02 CR	Deon Lendore (TRI)	46.59	Jermaine Gayle (JAM)	46.80
800 metres	Anthonio Mascoll (BAR)	1:52.16	Shaquille Dill (BER)	1:53.31	Henry Stevens-Carty (BER)	1:53.45
1500 metres	Kemoy Campbell (JAM)	3:48.99	Matthew Wright (BAR)	3:59.21	Kevin White (JAM)	4:02.81
5000 metres	Kemoy Campbell (JAM)	14:34.34 CR	Matthew Wright (BAR)	15:45.28	(Guadeloupe) /Gary Siwsanker (GLP)	16:16.30
110 metres hurdles (1.3 m/s)	Jehue Gordon (TRI)	13.41 CR	Greggmar Swift (BAR)	13.75	Stefan Fennel (JAM)	13.76
400 metres hurdles	Jehue Gordon (TRI)	49.76 CR	Dwayne Extol (JAM)	51.50	Nejmi Burnside (BAH)	52.23
High jump	Jonathan Reid (JAM)	2.14	Ryan Ingraham (BAH)	2.11	Troy Bullard (BAH)	2.11
Pole vault	Devon Dobson (JAM)	4.20	Terrane Roker (BAH)	3.60	Shem Edwards (LCA)	3.40
Long jump	Kamal Fuller (JAM)	7.62 (−0.1 m/s)	Seon Stafford (TRI)	7.34 (−0.1 m/s)	(Guadeloupe) /Curt Caboul (GLP)	7.24 (−0.3 m/s)
Triple jump	Elton Walcott (TRI)	15.91 w (2.2 m/s)	(Martinique) /Ulrick Bolosier (MTQ)	15.49 (1.6 m/s)	Seon Stafford (TRI)	14.67 (1.3 m/s)
Shot put	Quincy Wilson (TRI)	18.67 CR	Ashinia Miller (JAM)	18.41	Chad Wright (JAM)	18.19
Discus throw	Chad Wright (JAM)	63.11 CR	Quincy Wilson (TRI)	62.95	Travis Smikle (JAM)	58.24
Javelin throw	Keshorn Walcott (TRI)	63.41	John Jones (BAR)	63.24	André Bazil (DMA)	60.24
Heptathlon	Ramone Bailey (JAM)	4586	Tre Adderley (BAH)	4264	Lyndon Toussaint (GRN)	4234
4 × 100 metres relay	Jamaica; Brenard Brady; Kemar Bailey-Cole; Julian Forte; Brandon Tomlinson	40.10	Trinidad and Tobago; Christian Benjamin; Sabian Cox; Jonathan Holder; Shermund Allsop	40.41	Bahamas; Javon Rolle; Trevorvano Mackey; Ulysses Hinsey; Geno Jones	40.99
4 × 400 metres relay	Jamaica; Dwayne Extol; Jermaine Gayle; Donahue Williams; Demar Murray	3:10.63	Bahamas; Earle Rahming; Alonzo Russell; O'Jay Ferguson; Nejmi Burnside	3:10:69	Trinidad and Tobago; Osei Alleyne-Forte; Deon Lendore; Jonathan Holder; Jehue Gordon	3:11.59

: Open event for both junior and youth athletes.

=== Girls under 20 (Junior) ===
Event	Gold		Silver		Bronze	
100 metres (0.7 m/s)	Michelle-Lee Ahye (TRI)	11.50	Allison Peter (ISV)	11.51	V'Alonee Robinson (BAH)	11.57
200 metres (0.5 m/s)	Allison Peter (ISV)	23.29	Tynia Gaither (BAH)	23.83	Diandre Gilbert (JAM)	23.85
400 metres	Katherina Smith (BAH)	53.71	Sparkle McKnight (TRI)	53.96	Kanika Beckles (GRN)	54.04
800 metres	Natoya Goule (JAM)	2:06.03	Alena Brooks (TRI)	2:08.97	Jessica James (TRI)	2:11.76
1500 metres	Natoya Goule (JAM)	4:36.34	Sharlene Nickle (JAM)	4:42.13	Dawnell Collymore (TRI)	4:46.03
3000 metres	Aleitha McLaughlin (JAM)	10:41.28	Sharlene Nickle (JAM)	10:43.61	Taylor-Ashley Bean (BER)	10:47.84
100 metres hurdles (0.5 m/s)	Samantha Elliot (JAM)	13.42 CR	Tonique Sobah (JAM)	13.55	Ivanique Kemp (BAH)	14.21
400 metres hurdles	Ristananna Tracey (JAM)	58.58	Danielle Dowie (JAM)	59.09	Gabriela Cumberbatch (TRI)	59.84
High jump	Shanice Hall (JAM)	1.80	Peta-Gaye Reid (JAM)	1.76	Jeanelle Ovid (TRI)	1.73
Long jump	Rochelle Farquharson (JAM)	6.03 (−0.1 m/s)	Carissa Leacock (TRI)	6.02 (−0.4 m/s)	Jasmine Brunson (BER)	5.86 (0.3 m/s)
Triple jump	Sandisha Antoine (LCA)	12.64 w (2.1 m/s)	Rochelle Farquharson (JAM)	12.54 (0.8 m/s)	Allison Outerbridge (BER)	12.10 (0.3 m/s)
Shot put	Candicea Bernard (JAM)	13.38	Ashlee Smith (TRI)	13.06	Racquel Williams (BAH)	12.40
Discus throw	Sasha Gaye Marston (JAM)	46.07	Ashlee Smith (TRI)	43.43	Racquel Williams (BAH)	39.55
Javelin throw	Carlene Johnson (BAH)	42.61	(Martinique) /Myriam Sacama-Isidore (MTQ)	40.97	Darlene Lewis (TRI)	37.64
Pentathlon	Janieve Russell (JAM)	3825	(Martinique) /Audelia Da Veiga (MTQ)	3443	Kiersten La Roche (TRI)	3285
4 × 100 metres relay	Trinidad and Tobago; Sha-Shauna Mason; Michelle-Lee Ahye; Gabriela Cumberbatch; T'Keyah Dumoy	45.06	Bahamas; V'Alonee Robinson; Anthonique Strachan; Rashan Brown; Tynia Gaither	45.59	Jamaica; Yanique Ellington; Antonique Campbell; Danielle Williams; Diandre Gilbert	45.69
4 × 400 metres relay	Jamaica; Danielle Dowie; Natoya Goule; Orenthia Bennett; Ristananna Tracey	3:37.15	Trinidad and Tobago; Sparkle McKnight; Jessica James; Gabriela Cumberbatch; Alena Brooks	3:37.32	Barbados; Sade Sealy; Shani Adams; Sade-Mariah Greenidge; Mara Weekes	3:41.30

: Open event for both junior and youth athletes.

=== Boys under 17 (Youth) ===
Event	Gold		Silver		Bronze	
100 metres (0.6 m/s)	Odean Skeen (JAM)	10.53	Jeneko Place (BER)	10.71	Tahir Walsh (ATG)	10.84
200 metres (1.2 m/s)	Odean Skeen (JAM)	20.84 CR	Jeneko Place (BER)	21.27	Odail Todd (JAM)	21.55
400 metres	Lennox Williams (JAM)	48.01	Darvin Sandy (TRI)	48.62	Omari McDonald (JAM)	48.99
800 metres	Jerrard Mason (BAR)	1:54.66	Oshane Turner (JAM)	1:55.79	Ashley Riley (BAH)	1:56.64
1500 metres	Mark London (TRI)	4:08.28	Nicholas Landeau (TRI)	4:12.37	Juma Mouchette (BER)	4:12.82
3000 metres	Mark London (TRI)	9:10.12	Nicholas Landeau (TRI)	9:10.80	Aaron Lee (JAM)	9:23.00
100 metres hurdles (1.0 m/s)	Davian Dennis (JAM)	13.28	Omar Graham (JAM)	13.29	Tramaine Maloney (BAR)	13.55
400 metres hurdles	Stephen Newbold (BAH)	52.75 CR	Tramaine Maloney (BAR)	53.87	Dario Scantlebury (BAR)	56.26
High jump	Ashani Wright (JAM)	1.98	Ifeanyi Otuonye (TCA)	1.98	Clive Pullen (JAM)	1.85
Long jump	Clive Pullen (JAM)	6.72 (1.2 m/s)	Lathone Collie-Minns (BAH)	6.68 (−1.4 m/s)	Christian Wright (BER)	6.66 (−0.7 m/s)
Triple jump	Lathone Collie-Minns (BAH)	14.86 (0.8 m/s)	Latario Collie-Minns (BAH)	14.78 w (2.4 m/s)	(Martinique) /Jean-Noël Cretinoir (MTQ)	14.78 (0.9 m/s)
Shot put	Chadrick Decosta (JAM)	16.99 CR	Kashif Ford (JAM)	16.32	Hezekiel Romeo (TRI)	16.18
Discus throw	Fedrick Dacres (JAM)	52.99 CR	Chadrick Decosta (JAM)	50.80	Kenejah Williams (TRI)	42.23
Javelin throw	Adrian Williams (SKN)	57.86	Janiel Craigg (BAR)	57.86	Gerrio Rahming (BAH)	57.74
4 × 100 metres relay	Jamaica; Omar Graham; Odean Skeen; Odail Todd; Davian Dennis	41.62	Bahamas; Delano Davis; Anthony Farrington; James Cash; Julian Munroe	42.00	Trinidad and Tobago; Breon Mullings; Ayodele Taffe; Nicholas Douglas; John-Mark Constantine	42.26
4 × 400 metres relay	Trinidad and Tobago; Machel Cedenio; Theon Lewis; Shaquille Glasgow; Darvin Sandy	3:16.30	Bahamas; Stephan Hepburn; Renaldo Tinker; Stephen Newbold; Andre Wells	3:17.53	Barbados; Tramaine Maloney; Nikolai Gall; Dario Scantlebury; Jerrard Mason	3:20.31

=== Girls under 17 (Youth) ===
Event	Gold		Silver		Bronze	
100 metres (0.7 m/s)	Chantelle Morrison (CAY)	11.74	Channiel Johnson (JAM)	11.96	Marvar Etienne (BAH)	12.01
200 metres (2.5 m/s)	Shericka Jackson (JAM)	23.64 w	Saqukine Cameron (JAM)	23.80 w	Shavonne Husbands (BAR)	24.26 w
400 metres	Shaunae Miller (BAH)	53.36 CR	Shericka Jackson (JAM)	53.71	Olivia James (JAM)	53.89
800 metres	Marlene Eubanks (JAM)	2:11.86	Domonique Williams (TRI)	2:13.42	Sonia Gaskin (BAR)	2:13.60
1500 metres	Jevina Straker (GUY)	4:43.33	Marlene Eubanks (JAM)	4:43.45	Vanessa Philbert (AHO)	4:44.87
100 metres hurdles (4.1 m/s)	Megan Simmonds (JAM)	13.64 w	Shenel Fancis (JAM)	13.69 w	Shakera Hall (BAR)	13.97 w
300 metres hurdles	Kernesha Spann (TRI)	42.16	Shenel Fancis (JAM)	42.51	Kimone Green (JAM)	42.62
High jump	Akela Jones (BAR)	1.85 CR	Chanice Porter (JAM)	1.74	Jeanelle Scheper (LCA)	1.68
Long jump	Chanice Porter (JAM)	5.64	Opal James (JAM)	5.47	Jeanelle Scheper (LCA)	5.28
Triple jump	(Martinique) /Aimée Adamis (MTQ)	11.79 (0.1 m/s)	Opal James (JAM)	11.71 (−0.6 m/s)	Akeila Richardson (BER)	11.68 (0.6 m/s)
Shot put	Gleneve Grange (JAM)	11.46	Cherisse Murray (TRI)	11.09	Shareday Curiel (AHO)	10.96
Discus throw	Shaunna Downey (TRI)	34.79	Gleneve Grange (JAM)	34.57	Cherisse Murray (TRI)	30.98
Javelin throw	Shanica Yankey (DMA)	36.71	(Martinique) /Sandrine Mezen (MTQ)	34.59	Gleneve Grange (JAM)	31.27
4 × 100 metres relay	Jamaica; Channiel Johnson; Kadisha Dallas; Saqukine Cameron; Shericka Jackson	45.98	Barbados; Akela Taylor; Akela Jones; Shakera Hall; Shavonne Husbands	46.66	Bahamas; Devynne Charlton; Shaunae Miller; Pedrya Seymour; Marvar Etienne	46.85
4 × 400 metres relay	Jamaica; Saqukine Cameron; Olivia James; Marlene Eubanks; Shericka Jackson	3:44.02	Trinidad and Tobago; Desiree Harper; Onika Murray; Domonique Williams; Kernesha Spann	3:46.61	Bahamas; Rachante Colebrooke; Pedrya Seymour; Shaunae Miller; Dannielle Gibson	3:48.86

: Exhibition event.

== Medal table (unofficial) ==
* Host nation (Cayman Islands)

Rank	Nation	Gold	Silver	Bronze	Total
1	Jamaica^{[a]}^{[c]}	36	22	14	72
2	Trinidad and Tobago	12	16	12	40
3	Bahamas	6	10	13	29
4	Barbados	3	7	8	18
5	Grenada	2	0	2	4
6	Martinique^{[a]}	1	4	1	6
7	Saint Kitts and Nevis	1	1	0	2
7	U.S. Virgin Islands	1	1	0	2
9	Saint Lucia	1	0	3	4
10	Dominica^{[a]}	1	0	1	2
11	Cayman Islands*	1	0	0	1
11	Guyana	1	0	0	1
13	Bermuda^{[b]}	0	3	7	10
14	Netherlands Antilles	0	1	2	3
15	Turks and Caicos Islands	0	1	0	1
16	Guadeloupe	0	0	2	2
17	Antigua and Barbuda^{[b]}	0	0	1	1
Totals (17 entries)		66	66	66	198

An (official) medal count was published. However, there are a couple of mismatches to the unofficial count as displayed above

- ^[a] The official count does not contain the results (gold for Dominica, silver for Martinique, bronze for Jamaica) for the girls' U-17 javelin throw which is dubbed as "exhibition event".
- ^[b] The official count displays 8 bronze medals for Bermuda, but only one bronze medal for Guadeloupe. This is not reflected in the results.
- ^[c] The official count displays 37 gold and 13 bronze medals for Jamaica. If this was correct, there would be 66 gold medals, 65 silver medals, and 64 bronze medals in total (disregarding the results for the girls U-17 javelin throw). Again, there is no evidence for this in the results.

== Participation (unofficial) ==
Detailed result lists can be found on the CFPI Timing, and on the World Junior Athletics History website. An unofficial count yields the number of about 427 athletes (234 junior (under-20) and 193 youth (under-17)) from about 24 countries:

- Anguilla (3)
- Antigua and Barbuda (5)
- Aruba (5)
- Bahamas (68)
- Barbados (34)
- Bermuda (20)
- British Virgin Islands (8)
- Cayman Islands (27)
- Dominica (9)
- Grenada (8)
- /Guadeloupe (14)
- Guyana (8)
- Haiti (4)
- Jamaica (70)
- /Martinique (21)
- Montserrat (4)
- Netherlands Antilles (11)
- Saint Kitts and Nevis (7)
- Saint Lucia (16)
- Saint Vincent and the Grenadines (3)
- Suriname (5)
- Trinidad and Tobago (66)
- Turks and Caicos Islands (7)
- U.S. Virgin Islands (4)
