= Natoya Goule-Toppin =

Jamaican middle-distance runner

Natoya Goule-Toppin OLY
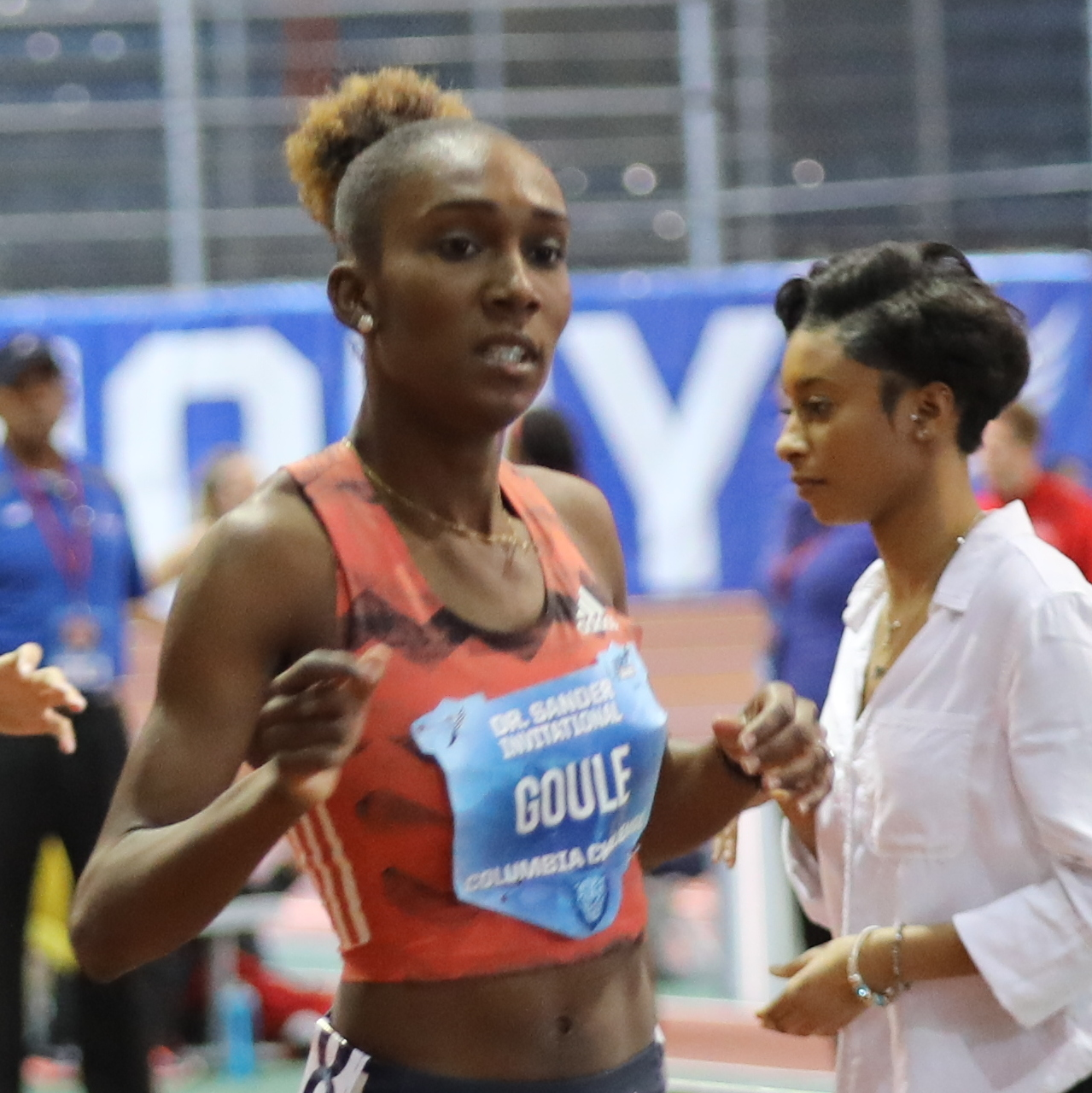
- Goule competing in 2019

Personal information
- Born: 30 March 1991 (age 35) Manchester, Jamaica
- Height: 1.62 m (5 ft 4 in)
- Weight: 47 kg (104 lb)

Sport
- Country: Jamaica
- Sport: Track and field
- Event: 800 meters
- College team: South Plains College; LSU Tigers; Clemson Tigers

Achievements and titles
- Personal bests: 400 m: 51.52 (2011); 800 m: 1:55.96 NR (2023); Indoor; 800 m: 1:58.46i NR (2022); 1000 m: 2:34.37i NR (2019)
Medal record
Women's athletics
Representing Jamaica
World Indoor Championships
Silver medal – second place	2014 Sopot	4×400 m relay
World Relays
Bronze medal – third place	2017 Nassau	4×400 m mixed
Commonwealth Games
Silver medal – second place	2022 Birmingham	4×400 m relay
Bronze medal – third place	2018 Gold Coast	800 m
Pan American Games
Gold medal – first place	2019 Lima	800 m
Bronze medal – third place	2019 Lima	4×400 m relay
NACAC Championships
Silver medal – second place	2018 Toronto	800 m
CAC Championships
Gold medal – first place	2013 Morelia	800 m
Gold medal – first place	2011 Mayagüez	4×400 m relay
Bronze medal – third place	2011 Mayagüez	800 m
Diamond League
Second place	2022 Zurich	800 m
Third place	2024 Brussels	800 m
Third place	2023 Eugene	800 m
Third place	2021 Zurich	800 m
CARIFTA Games (Junior)
Gold medal – first place	2008 Basseterre	800 m
Gold medal – first place	2008 Basseterre	1500 m
Gold medal – first place	2009 Vieux Fort	800 m
Gold medal – first place	2009 Vieux Fort	1500 m
Gold medal – first place	2010 George Town	800 m
Gold medal – first place	2010 George Town	1500 m
CARIFTA Games (Youth)
Gold medal – first place	2005 Bacolet	800 m
Gold medal – first place	2005 Bacolet	1500 m
Gold medal – first place	2006 Les Abymes	800 m
Gold medal – first place	2006 Les Abymes	1500 m
Gold medal – first place	2007 Providenciales	800 m
Gold medal – first place	2007 Providenciales	1500 m

Natoya Goule-Toppin (born 30 March 1991) is a Jamaican middle-distance runner. In the 800 metres she is the 2019 Pan American Games champion, 2018 NACAC Championship silver medallist, and 2018 Commonwealth Games bronze medallist. Goule is the current Jamaican record holder at the event both out- and indoors, and also for the indoor 1000 metres.

She has represented Jamaica on numerous occasions, including both the 2016 Rio Olympics and 2020 Tokyo Olympics.

== Running career ==
=== Youth ===
Goule established herself in athletics already by the age of 12, when she ran at the ISSA Athletic Championships in Jamaica. Representing Manchester High School, she holds records in the Girls' Class 1 1500m as well as the Class 3 800m, and she has accumulated 15 individual gold medals at the Inter-Secondary Schools Boys and Girls Championships, and 12 individual at the CARIFTA Games.

=== International ===
Goule first attended South Plains College and ran for their track team. At around the same time South Plains was already recruiting other Jamaican runners, such as Kemoy Campbell. Eventually, however, she would go on to study and run at Louisiana State University. After a few seasons at LSU she transferred to Clemson.

In 2014, racing in the heats, she was a member of Jamaica's women's 4x400 relay team which won the silver medal at the 2014 IAAF World Indoor Championships.

Goule has won races at numerous meetings; for example, in 2022, she won two 800 metres indoor events (NY New Balance Indoor Grand Prix, and World Indoor Tour's Meeting Hauts-de-France Pas-de-Calais where she improved her Jamaican indoor record to 1:58.46), and a 1000-metres indoor event (Clemson Invitational, Clemson, SC).

She placed fourth at the World Indoor Championships in Belgrade with a time of 2:01.18.

== Achievements ==
=== Circuit performances ===
Grand Slam Track results
Slam	Race group	Event	Pl.	Time	Prize money
2025 Kingston Slam	Short distance	800 m	6th	1:59.78	US$12,500
2025 Kingston Slam	Short distance	1500 m	7th	4:20.73	US$12,500

=== International competitions ===
Representing Jamaica
Year	Competition	Venue	Position	Event	Notes
2005	CARIFTA Games (U17)	Bacolet, Trinidad and Tobago	1st	800 m	2:14.16
2005	CARIFTA Games (U17)	Bacolet, Trinidad and Tobago	1st	1500 m	4:39.05
2006	CARIFTA Games (U17)	Les Abymes, Guadeloupe	1st	800 m	2:09.59
2006	CARIFTA Games (U17)	Les Abymes, Guadeloupe	1st	1500 m	4:32.70
2006	CARIFTA Games (U17)	Les Abymes, Guadeloupe	1st	4 × 400 m	3:43.65
2006	Central American and Caribbean; Junior Championships (U17)	Port of Spain, Trinidad and Tobago	1st	800 m	2:09.15
2006	Central American and Caribbean; Junior Championships (U17)	Port of Spain, Trinidad and Tobago	1st	1200 m	3:33.74
2006	Central American and Caribbean; Junior Championships (U17)	Port of Spain, Trinidad and Tobago	1st	4 × 400 m	3:45.31
2007	CARIFTA Games (U17)	Providenciales, Turks and Caicos	1st	800 m	2:11.68
2007	CARIFTA Games (U17)	Providenciales, Turks and Caicos	1st	1500 m	4:36.26
2007	World Youth Championships	Ostrava, Czech Republic	8th (sf)	800 m	2:08.37
2008	CARIFTA Games (U20)	Basseterre, Saint Kitts and Nevis	1st	800 m	2:05.90
2008	CARIFTA Games (U20)	Basseterre, Saint Kitts and Nevis	1st	1500 m	4:33.69
2008	World Junior Championships	Bydgoszcz, Poland	22nd (h)	800 m	2:09.55
2008	World Junior Championships	Bydgoszcz, Poland	9th (h)	4 × 400 m	3:38.00
2009	CARIFTA Games (U20)	Vieux Fort, Saint Lucia	1st	800 m	2:09:27
2009	CARIFTA Games (U20)	Vieux Fort, Saint Lucia	1st	1500 m	4:27.48
2009	CARIFTA Games (U20)	Vieux Fort, Saint Lucia	1st	4 × 400 m	3:36.21
2010	CARIFTA Games (U20)	George Town, Cayman Islands	1st	800 m	2:06.03
2010	CARIFTA Games (U20)	George Town, Cayman Islands	1st	1500 m	4:36.34
2010	CARIFTA Games (U20)	George Town, Cayman Islands	1st	4 × 400 m	3:37.15
2010	Central American and Caribbean; Junior Championships (U20)	Santo Domingo, Dom. Rep.	1st	800 m	2:07.20
2010	World Junior Championships	Moncton, Canada	10th (sf)	800 m	2:05.07
2010	World Junior Championships	Moncton, Canada	3rd	4 × 400 m	3:32.24
2011	Central American and Caribbean Championships	Mayagüez, Puerto Rico	3rd	800 m	2:02.83
2011	Central American and Caribbean Championships	Mayagüez, Puerto Rico	1st	4 × 400 m	3:29.86
2013	Central American and Caribbean Championships	Morelia, Mexico	1st	800 m	2:02.02
2013	Central American and Caribbean Championships	Morelia, Mexico	–	4 × 400 m	DQ
2013	World Championships	Moscow, Russia	18th (h)	800 m	2:00.93
2014	World Indoor Championships	Sopot, Poland	6th	800 m	2:01.89
2014	World Indoor Championships	Sopot, Poland	2nd	4 × 400 m	3:29.43 (Note: Time from the heats; Goule was replaced in the final where Jamaica won the silver)
2014	IAAF World Relays	Nassau, Bahamas	5th	4 × 800 m	8:17.22
2014	Commonwealth Games	Glasgow, United Kingdom	12th (sf)	800 m	2:04.23
2015	World Championships	Beijing, China	33rd (h)	800 m	2:02.37
2016	World Indoor Championships	Portland, United States	17th (h)	800 m	2:08.23
2016	Olympic Games	Rio de Janeiro, Brazil	25th (h)	800 m	2:00.49
2017	World Championships	London, United Kingdom	22nd (h)	800 m	2:01.77
2018	World Indoor Championship	Birmingham, United Kingdom	8th (h)	800 m	2:02.49
2018	Commonwealth Games	Gold Coast, Australia	3rd	800 m	1:58.82
2018	NACAC Championships	Toronto, Canada	2nd	800 m	1:57.95
2019	Pan American Games	Lima, Peru	1st	800 m	2:01.26
2019	Pan American Games	Lima, Peru	3rd	4 × 400 m	3:27.61
2019	World Championships	Doha, Qatar	6th	800 m	2:00.11
2021	Olympic Games	Tokyo, Japan	8th	800 m	1:58.26
2022	World Indoor Championships	Belgrade, Serbia	4th	800 m i	2:01.18
2022	World Championships	Eugene, United States	5th	800 m	1:57.90
2022	Commonwealth Games	Birmingham, United Kingdom	4th	800 m	1:57.88
2022	Commonwealth Games	Birmingham, United Kingdom	2nd	4 × 400 m	3:26.93
2023	World Championships	Budapest, Hungary	18th (sf)	800 m	2:00.78
2024	World Indoor Championships	Glasgow, United Kingdom	12th (sf)	800 m	2:01.41
2024	Olympic Games	Paris, France	18th (sf)	800 m	1:59.14
2025	World Championships	Tokyo, Japan	20th (sf)	800 m	1:59.58
2026	World Indoor Championships	Toruń, Poland	11th (sf)	800 m	2:00.69

=== Other competitions ===
Representing Louisiana State University & Clemson University
Year	Competition	Venue	Position	Event	Notes
2015	NCAA Division I Outdoor Track & Field Championships	Eugene, Oregon	6th	800 m	2:05.19
2015	ACC Outdoor Track & Field Championships	Tallahassee, FL	1st	800 m	2:01.32
2015	NCAA Division I Indoor Track & Field Championships	Fayetteville, AR	1st	800 m i	2:01.64
2015	ACC Indoor Track & Field Championships	Blacksburg, VA	2nd	800 m i	2:03.57
2013	NCAA Division I Outdoor Track & Field Championships	Eugene, Oregon	1st	800 m	2:00.06
2013	SEC Outdoor Track & Field Championships	Columbia, MO	1st	800 m	2:01.12
2013	NCAA Division I Indoor Track & Field Championships	Fayetteville, AR	1st	800 m i	2:02.00
2013	SEC Indoor Track & Field Championships	Fayetteville, AR	2nd	800 m i	2:03.08
