= V'Alonee Robinson =

Bahamian sprinter

Personal information
- Born: May 6, 1992 (age 34)
Medal record
Athletics
Representing Bahamas
CAC Championships
Bronze medal – third place	2011 Mayagüez	4×100 m relay
NACAC U-23 Championships
Silver medal – second place	2012 Irapuato	4x100 m relay
Pan American Junior Championships
Gold medal – first place	2011 Miramar	4×100 m relay
CAC Junior Championships (Junior)
Silver medal – second place	2010 Santo Domingo	4×100 m relay
CAC Junior Championships (U17)
Bronze medal – third place	2006 Port of Spain	4x100 m relay
CARIFTA Games Junior (U20)
Silver medal – second place	2009 Vieux Fort	4x100 m relay
Silver medal – second place	2010 George Town	4x100 m relay
Bronze medal – third place	2010 George Town	100 m
CARIFTA Games Youth (U17)
Bronze medal – third place	2008 Basseterre	100 m
Bronze medal – third place	2008 Basseterre	100 m Hurdles
Bronze medal – third place	2008 Basseterre	4x100 m relay

V'Alonee Robinson (born May 6, 1992) is a Bahamian sprinter (Born May 6, 1992) was selected for her country in the 4x100 meter relay at the 2012 Summer Olympics in London, England, but did not compete.

== Career ==
Robinson attended St Augustine's College, before going to Auburn University in Auburn, Alabama. She competed for the university's Auburn Tigers team where she was coached by Henry Rolle.

At the Bahamas Olympic Trials in June 2012, she finished third in the women's 100 meters, completing the race in a time of 11.73 seconds behind Chandra Sturrup and Carmiesha Cox. Robinson competed in the 4x100 meter relay women's team for the Bahamas in July that year at the North American, Central American and Caribbean Athletic Association Under-23 Championships in Guanajuato City, Mexico. She won a silver medal alongside Krystal Bodie, Ivanique Kemp and Amara Jones in a time of 45.71 seconds. Individually, Robinson came fourth in the women's 100 meters with a time of 11.56 seconds.

In July 2012, it was announced by the Bahamas Olympic Committee that Robinson had been selected for that year's Summer Olympics in London, England, as part of the pool for the women's 4x100 meter relay alongside Chandra Sturrup, Christine Amertil, Sheniqua Ferguson, Debbie Ferguson-McKenzie and Anthonique Strachan. It was Robinson's first Olympic Games, who said on her arrival "This is a wonderful experience. This is the big stage for athletes and I’m just happy to be here. This is the Olympics – everything is big here. It's a great experience and I’m just happy to be a part of it". Although she had hoped to be selected out of the pool, but was not selected for the first heat and the relay team failed to qualify for the final.
