= Colleen Felix =

Grenadian former track and field athlete

Personal information
- Nationality: Grenadian
- Born: November 30, 1989 (age 36) St. George's, Grenada

Sport
- Country: Grenada
- Sport: Track and field
- Event: Combined events

Achievements and titles
- Personal bests: Heptathlon: 5178, Javelin Throw: 47.62m
Medal record
Women's athletics
Representing Grenada
CARIFTA Games (U20)
Bronze medal – third place	2008 Basseterre	Javelin throw
Bronze medal – third place	2008 Basseterre	Heptathlon

Colleen Felix (born 30 November 1989) is a Grenadian former track and field athlete who competed in the heptathlon. In 2009, she set the national record in that event. She is also a former national record holder in the Javelin Throw with a distance of 47.62m at Arizona State Invitational on 26 March 2011. This record was subsequently broken by Candesha Scott in 2016 at the Carifta Games. After an absence from competition, Colleen returned to competition in 2017. She took part in the revived Whitsuntide games and then the OECS Track and Field Championships which were both held at the Kirani James Athletic Stadium in Grenada.

== College career ==
South Plains Community College (2009 & 2010) Colleen captured three NJCAA outdoor titles after winning the javelin in 2009 and 2010 and the triple jump in 2010...Helped South Plains win back-to-back NJCAA outdoor team titles in 2009 and 2010...National runner-up in the heptathlon and triple jump as a freshman...Finished second in the triple jump at the 2009 NJCAA Indoor Championships...Named the 2010 NJCAA Track & Field Athlete of the Year...Personal-best marks of 5,170 points (heptathlon), 154 feet, 2 inches (javelin), 42-10.25 (triple jump), 5-7 (high jump), 19-2 (long jump), 42-1.50 (shot put) and 14.14 in the 100-meter hurdles. Graduated 2010 with an associate degree in Sociology. University of Georgia (2011 & 2012) Indoor - Colleen finished with Second Team All-American honors after finishing 10th in the triple jump at the NCAA Indoor Championships...Won the Georgia women their first SEC indoor triple jump title since 1995 after reaching a personal-best mark of 44 feet, 3 ½ inches, improving her No. 2 spot in the Lady Bulldog record books...Had a career-best effort of 44-2 to take third at the Tyson Invitational...Improved her No. 1 triple jump mark in the national standings with a career-best and NCAA automatic qualifying effort of 44-1.50 to win the Virginia Tech Elite meet and move to No. 2 in the school record books...Won her second straight meet in the triple jump (43-1) and also finished sixth in the long jump (19-5.50) at the Big 12 vs. SEC Challenge...Took off for a personal-best and national leading mark of 43-5.75 to win the triple jump at the Clemson Challenge to open her UGA career.

Outdoor - Colleen had to sit out a majority of the NCAA East Prelims with a leg injury...Taking only three of six throws because of a leg injury, took fourth in the javelin (147-6) at the SEC Championships...However she was forced to sit out the triple jump as the conference's leader because of her injury...Finished first in the javelin after reaching 156-2 at the Drake Relays...Won the javelin at the Georgia-Missouri dual meet with a top throw of 153-6...Opened her season in the triple jump and shot to second in the school record books after winning the event with a career-best mark of 44-6.75 at the Spec Towns Invite...Also won the javelin at the Spec Towns meet with a mark of 153-10...Made her outdoor debut for the Lady Bulldogs and finished second in the javelin with a personal-best effort of 156-3 at the ASU Invite. On Jan. 19, 2011 in ATHENS, Colleen was named the Southeastern Conference Women's Field Athlete of the Week following her first meet with the Lady Bulldogs, according to an announcement from the league.

She suffered a torn hamstring with which she competed with the entire 2011 outdoor season without discovering until August that year. She had surgery in October 2011.

2012 Indoor - Colleen opened her season by finishing fourth in the triple jump at the Razorback Invitational with a top effort of 41 feet, 3 ¼ inches. She won her second consecutive triple jump title at the SEC Championships after traveling a season-best 42-8.25...Earned Second Team All-America honors for the second season in a row after taking 15th in the triple jump (38-4.75) at the NCAA Championships.

Outdoor - Colleen suffered three fouls in the triple jump to conclude her Lady Bulldog career at the NCAA East Prelims...Saved her best mark for her final attempt to take second in the triple jump (42 feet, 7 inches) at the SEC Championships while also finishing third in the javelin with a season-best mark of 149-8...Took fifth at the Drake Relays with a top mark of 41-8.75...Won the triple jump at the Spec Towns Invite after reaching 41-10 on her third attempt...Finished third in the javelin (128-3) at the Yellow Jacket Invite...Won the triple jump with a nationally leading mark of 43-1 and was runner-up in the javelin (146-6) at the Georgia Relays.

Graduated December 2012 with a bachelor's degree in Communication Studies.

== Personal bests ==
Event	Result	Venue	Date
Outdoor
200 m	25.99 s (wind: +1.1 m/s)	Santo Domingo	31 May 2008
Long jump	5.55 m (wind: +1.1 m/s)	Hutchinson, Kansas	22 May 2009
Shot put	12.82 m	Hutchinson, Kansas	21 May 2009
High jump	1.61 m	Hutchinson, Kansas	21 May 2009
800 m	2:46.61 s	Hutchinson, Kansas	22 May 2009
100 m hurdles	14.31s (wind: +1.9 m/s)	Hutchinson, Kansas	21 May 2009
Discus throw	32.57 m	Albuquerque, NM	2 May 2009
Javelin throw	47.62m	Tempe, Arizona	26 May 2011
Heptathlon	5178 pts	Hutchinson, Kansas	22 May 2009
Indoor
Triple jump	13.50m	Fayetteville, Arkansas	27 Feb 2011

== Competition record ==
Year	Competition	Venue	Position	Event	Notes
Representing Grenada
2008	CARIFTA Games	Basseterre, Saint Kitts and Nevis	3rd	Pentathlon	3497 points
2008	CARIFTA Games	Basseterre, Saint Kitts and Nevis	3rd	Javelin throw	41.33m
2008	Pan American Combined Events Championships	Santo Domingo, Dominican Republic	19th	Heptathlon	3859 points NJR
2017	Whitsuntide Games	Kirani James Athletic Stadium, Grenada	2nd	Long Jump	5.17m
2017	OECS Track and Field Championships	Kirani James Athletic Stadium, Grenada	6th	Long Jump	5.33m
