= 2008 CARIFTA Games =

XXXVII CARIFTA Games
- Dates: March 22–24
- Host city: Basseterre, Saint Kitts and Nevis
- Venue: Bird Rock Athletic Stadium
- Level: Junior and Youth
- Events: 66 (35 junior (incl. 3 open), 31 youth)
- Participation: about 488 (278 junior, 210 youth) athletes from about 22 nations
- Records set: 9 games records

The 37th CARIFTA Games was held in the Bird Rock Athletic Stadium in Basseterre, Saint Kitts and Nevis, on March 21–24, 2008. IAAF president Lamine Diack was visiting the games emphasizing the event's importance and high value. Detailed reports on the results were given.

== Participation (unofficial) ==
Detailed result lists can be found on the St. Kitts-Nevis Amateur Athletic Association website, and on the "World Junior Athletics History" website. An unofficial count yields the number of about 488 athletes (278 junior (under-20) and 210 youth (under-17)) from about 22 countries: Anguilla (11), Antigua and Barbuda (10), Aruba (4), Bahamas (55), Barbados (39), Bermuda (24), British Virgin Islands (10), Cayman Islands (12), Dominica (4), Grenada (19), Guadeloupe (28), Guyana (3), Jamaica (68), Martinique (40), Netherlands Antilles (6), Saint Kitts and Nevis (55), Saint Lucia (11), Saint Vincent and the Grenadines (6), Suriname (1), Trinidad and Tobago (63), Turks and Caicos Islands (9), US Virgin Islands (10).

== Records ==
A total of 9 new games records were set.

In the boys' U-20 category, Jamaican long distance runner Kemoy Campbell set the new 5000m record to 14:46.51, while his compatriot K'don Samuels improved the 21-year-old mark of 4.26m in pole vault to 4.60m.

In the girls' U-20 category, four new games records were set: for 800 metres, by Natoya Goule of Jamaica to 2:05.90, for 100 metres hurdles record by Kierre Beckles of Barbados to 13.43s (0.4 m/s), for the Pentathlon by Salcia Slack of Jamaica to 3935 points, and by the 4 x 100 metres relay team from the Bahamas to 44.36s.

Finally, there were three more games records in the boys' U-17 category: by Bahamians Aaron Wilmore who finished the 100 m hurdles in 12.88s (0.6 m/s), and compatriot Nejmi Burnside with 52.81s in the 400 m hurdles. Dillon Simon of Dominica reached a width of 16.63m to establish a new U-17 shot put record.

== Austin Sealy Award ==
The Austin Sealy Trophy for the most outstanding athlete of the games was awarded to Kierre Beckles of Barbados. She won the gold medals in the 100m hurdles competition in the junior (U-20) category setting the new games record to 13.43s, and a bronze medal in the 4 × 100 m relay.

== Medal summary ==
Complete results can be found on the St. Kitts-Nevis Amateur Athletic Association website, and on the "World Junior Athletics History" website.

=== Boys under 20 (Junior) ===
Event	Gold		Silver		Bronze	
100 metres (0.1 m/s)	Yohan Blake (JAM)	10.32	Dexter Lee (JAM)	10.48	Joel Dillon (TRI)	10.57
200 metres (5.2 m/s)	Nickel Ashmeade (JAM)	20.16 w	Ramone McKenzie (JAM)	20.33 w	Kendall Bacchus (TRI)	20.78 w
400 metres	Rondell Bartholomew (GRN)	46.86	Jovon Toppin (TRI)	47.26	Fabian Norgrove (BAR)	47.55
800 metres	Gavyn Nero (TRI)	1:51.94	Theon O'Connor (JAM)	1:52.49	Aaron Evans (BER)	1:52.61
1500 metres	Gavyn Nero (TRI)	3:56.14	Kemoy Campbell (JAM)	3:56.80	Conroy Crossman (JAM)	3:59.36
5000 metres	Kemoy Campbell (JAM)	14:46.51 CR	Christian Rock (BAR)	15:57.99	Kendis Bullard (TRI)	15:58.01
110 metres hurdles (-0.5 m/s)	Keiron Stewart (JAM)	13.50	Warren Weir (JAM)	14.13	Greggmar Swift (BAR)	14.22
400 metres hurdles	Andre Peart (JAM)	51.81	Keiron Stewart (JAM)	53.05	Jehue Gordon (TRI)	53.18
High jump	Raymond Higgs (BAH)	2.10	Machell Baker (JAM)	2.05	Kirk Austin (BAR)	2.00
Pole vault	K'don Samuels (JAM)	4.60 CR	Edvardo Humes (BAH)	3.20		
Long jump	Kyron Blaise (TRI)	7.65 w (4.0 m/s)	Tarik Batchelor (JAM)	7.34 (0.6 m/s)	(Guadeloupe) /Dylan Rigot (GLP)	7.29 (1.8 m/s)
Triple jump	Kyron Blaise (TRI)	15.76 (-0.5 m/s)	Tarik Batchelor (JAM)	15.49 w (5.0 m/s)	(Martinique) /Jérémie Varsovie (MTQ)	15.22 w (3.0 m/s)
Shot put	Robert Collingwood (TRI)	16.23	Shakir Simons (GRN)	15.93	(Martinique) /Mike Montlouis-Dupa (MTQ)	15.67
Discus throw	Emmanuel Stewart (TRI)	51.46	Noel Facey (JAM)	48.84	(Martinique) /Jhovanie Legendart (MTQ)	46.42
Javelin throw	Trevor Ifill (BAR)	65.48	(Guadeloupe) /Laury Battet (GLP)	54.23	Jamel Paul (TRI)	54.00
Heptathlon	Shane Brathwaite (BAR)	5006	Lavaughn Ferguson (BAH)	4515	Thomas Davis (BAH)	4474
4 x 100 metres relay	Jamaica; Warren Weir; Ramone McKenzie; Nickel Ashmeade; Dexter Lee	39.80	Trinidad and Tobago; Abiola Glasgow; Kendall Bacchus; Kyle Jacelon; Joel Dillon	40.68	Barbados; Shekeim Greaves; Renaldo Bailey; Jerry-Lee Davis; Shane Brathwaite	41.59
4 x 400 metres relay	Jamaica; Keiron Stewart; Ramone McKenzie; Nickel Ashmeade; Andre Peart	3:09.71	Trinidad and Tobago; Jameel Alleyne-Walcott; Kervin Morgan; Ancil Nicholson; Jovon Toppin	3:11.34	Bahamas; Jeffery Gibson; Demetrius Pinder; Brandon Miller; Karlton Rolle	3:12.09

: Open event for both junior and youth athletes.

=== Girls under 20 (Junior) ===
Event	Gold		Silver		Bronze	
100 metres (2.5 m/s)	Carrie Russell (JAM)	11.39 w	Meritzer Williams (SKN)	11.41 w	Sheniqua Ferguson (BAH)	11.50 w
200 metres (1.4 m/s)	Nivea Smith (BAH)	23.01	Meritzer Williams (SKN)	23.11	Jura Levy (JAM)	23.28
400 metres	Janeil Bellille (TRI)	53.57	Kayan Robinson (JAM)	53.77	Alicia Cutenar (JAM)	54.05
800 metres	Natoya Goule (JAM)	2:05.90 CR	Afyia Walker (TRI)	2:10.20	Jessica James (TRI)	2:11.07
1500 metres	Natoya Goule (JAM)	4:33.69	Mackola Joseph (JAM)	4:45.22	Alika Morgan (GUY)	4:47.48
3000 metres	Neisha Morgan (JAM)	10:15.22	Alika Morgan (GUY)	10:15.28	Kimberly Brown (JAM)	10:16.15
100 metres hurdles (0.4 m/s)	Kierre Beckles (BAR)	13.43 CR	Rosemarie Carty (JAM)	13.63	Krystal Bodie (BAH)	13.72
400 metres hurdles	Janeil Bellille (TRI)	58.08	Shana-Gaye Tracey (JAM)	58.17	Nikita Tracey (JAM)	59.69
High jump	Terri Ann Grant (JAM)	1.65	(Guadeloupe) /Maeva Caracasse (GLP)	1.65	Shinelle Proctor (AIA)	1.65
Long jump	(Martinique) /Daniella Sacama-Isidore (MTQ)	6.03	(Guadeloupe) /Gaëlle Gendrey (GLP)	6.02	(Martinique) /Keshia Willix (MTQ)	5.90
Triple jump	(Martinique) /Keshia Willix (MTQ)	12.91 w (3.6 m/s)	Salcia Slack (JAM)	12.81 (1.2 m/s)	(Guadeloupe) /Gaëlle Gendrey (GLP)	12.51 (0.0 m/s)
Shot put	(Martinique) /Myriam Lixfe (MTQ)	14.61	(Martinique) /Gianni Robard (MTQ)	13.93	Hilenn James (TRI)	13.29
Discus throw	Geneva Greaves (JAM)	44.68	Candicea Bernard (JAM)	40.29	(Martinique) /Laurenza Granville (MTQ)	37.03
Javelin throw	Deandra Dottin (BAR)	47.00	(Martinique) /Kevine Egarnes (MTQ)	42.12	Colleen Felix (GRN)	41.33
Pentathlon	Salcia Slack (JAM)	3935 CR	(Martinique) /Audelia Da Vaiga (MTQ)	3591	Colleen Felix (GRN)	3497
4 x 100 metres relay	Bahamas; Sheniqua Ferguson; Krystal Bodie; Cache Armbrister; Nivea Smith	44.36 CR	Jamaica; Rosemarie Carty; Jura Levy; Alicia Cutenar; Carrie Russell	44.90	Barbados; Tameka Rawlins; Mara Weekes; Sade Sealy; Kierre Beckles	45.75
4 x 400 metres relay	Jamaica; Kayan Robinson; Shana-Gaye Tracey; Nikita Tracey; Alicia Cutenar	3:39.12	Trinidad and Tobago; Jessica James; Sparkle McKnight; Afyia Walker; Janeil Bellille	3:43.65	Barbados; Sade Sealy; Latoya Griffith; Sade Greene; Mara Weekes	3:44.41

: Open event for both junior and youth athletes.

=== Boys under 17 (Youth) ===
Event	Gold		Silver		Bronze	
100 metres (-1.6 m/s)	Geno Jones (BAH)	10.76	Moriba Morain (TRI)	10.84	Christopher Garia (AHO)	11.00
200 metres (2.0 m/s)	Kirani James (GRN)	21.38	Moriba Morain (TRI)	21.74	Earl Lee (JAM)	21.89
400 metres	Kirani James (GRN)	47.87	Javere Bell (JAM)	49.08	Nolan Williams (JAM)	49.34
800 metres	Javere Bell (JAM)	1:56.12	Anthonio Mascoll (BAR)	1:56.68	Waquar Dacosta (JAM)	1:58.99
1500 metres	Waquar Dacosta (JAM)	4:09.78	Matthew Wright (BAR)	4:10.44	Ibrahim Hinds (BAR)	4:16.30
3000 metres	Matthew Wright (BAR)	9:05.11	Dwayne Hibbert (JAM)	9:24.89	(Guadeloupe) /Gary Siwsanker (GLP)	9:25.04
100 metres hurdles (0.6 m/s)	Aaron Wilmore (BAH)	12.88 CR	Tyrel Forde (BAR)	13.13	D'Omar Boyden (JAM)	13.49
400 metres hurdles	Nejmi Burnside (BAH)	52.81 CR	Tyrel Forde (BAR)	55.08	Omar Charles (TRI)	55.29
High jump	Jonathan Reid (JAM)	2.05	Wendrico Seymour (TCA)	1.95	Travis Webb (CAY)	1.95
Long jump	Wendrico Seymour (TCA)	6.86	Winsley Tweeboom (AHO)	6.67	Charles Turnquest (BAH)	6.65
Triple jump	Elton Walcott (TRI)	14.66 (1.3 m/s)	Jonathan Reid (JAM)	14.17 w (3.2 m/s)	Julian Forte (JAM)	13.59 w (2.6 m/s)
Shot put	Dillon Simon (DMA)	16.63 CR	John Jones (BAR)	15.93	Rajae Gayle (JAM)	14.75
Discus throw	Rajae Gayle (JAM)	48.54	Dillon Simon (DMA)	47.00	Rojay Dacres (JAM)	46.70
Javelin throw	John Jones (BAR)	55.98	Emron Gibbs (GRN)	54.72	Merfilius Leslie (DMA)	51.90
4 x 100 metres relay	Bahamas; Aaron Wilmore; Demetri Knowles; Johnathan Farquharson; Geno Jones	41.85	Trinidad and Tobago; Christian Benjamin; Jonathan Holder; Koffi Hunte; Moriba Morain	42.29	Jamaica; Lemmar Wilson; Earl Lee; A-Shawni Mitchell; Rolando Reid	42.62
4 x 400 metres relay	Jamaica; Nolan Williams; Rolando Reid; A-Shawni Mitchell; Javere Bell	3:19.26	Trinidad and Tobago; Hendrix Foncette; Omar Charles; Kory Woods; Deon Lendore	3:21.20	Bahamas; Alonzo Russell; Zhivago Thompson; Glenwood Baillou; Nejmi Burnside	3:22.77

=== Girls under 17 (Youth) ===
Event	Gold		Silver		Bronze	
100 metres (0.4 m/s)	Michelle-Lee Ahye (TRI)	11.66	Allison Peter (ISV)	11.91	V'Alonee Robinson (BAH)	11.91
200 metres (1.6 m/s)	Allison Peter (ISV)	23.99	Kai Selvon (TRI)	24.14	Vanessa Bennet (SKN)	24.40
400 metres	Shericka Jackson (JAM)	54.52	Sandrae Farquharson (JAM)	54.56	Rashan Brown (BAH)	55.52
800 metres	Chantal Duncan (JAM)	2:13.46	Ristananna Tracey (JAM)	2:13.77	Hughnique Rolle (BAH)	2:17.58
1500 metres	Kenryca Francis (ATG)	4:48.82	Carla Thompson (JAM)	4:52.34	Antonia Wilson (GRN)	4:56.18
100 metres hurdles (-0.9 m/s)	Kenrisha Brathwaite (BAR)	14.04	Samantha Elliot (JAM)	14.17	V'Alonee Robinson (BAH)	14.18
300 metres hurdles	Danielle Dowie (JAM)	42.62	Kenrisha Brathwaite (BAR)	43.61	Sade Greenidge (BAR)	44.61
High jump	Petagaye Reid (JAM)	1.74	Akela Jones (BAR)	1.71	Deandra Daniel (TRI)	1.65
Long jump	V'Alonee Robinson (BAH)	5.82	Janieve Russell (JAM)	5.72	Rochelle Farquharson (JAM)	5.67
Triple jump	Shanieka Thomas (JAM)	11.83 (-2.2 m/s)	Tamara Myers (BAH)	11.55 (-3.5 m/s)	Rochelle Farquharson (JAM)	11.53 (-1.6 m/s)
Shot put	(Martinique) /Yasmine Merkiled (MTQ)	11.74	(Guadeloupe) /Laurianne Laurendot (GLP)	11.36	Michelle Rogers (BAR)	11.18
Discus throw	Monique Henry (JAM)	34.02	Kyshona Knight (BAR)	32.86	Racquel Williams (BAH)	31.34
Javelin throw	(Martinique) /Laure Mongin (MTQ)	37.65	Kyshona Knight (BAR)	36.63	(Martinique) /Myriam Sacama-Isidore (MTQ)	34.54
4 x 100 metres relay	Jamaica; Natasha Morrison; Yanique Ellington; Sandrae Farquharson; Petra Fanty	46.51	Saint Kitts and Nevis; Arian Maynard; Vanessa Bennet; Trefasana White; Siana Leader	46.95	Bahamas; Sparkyl Cash; V'Alonee Robinson; Rashan Brown; Henrietta Carey	47.84
4 x 400 metres relay	Jamaica; Petra Fanty; Shericka Jackson; Danielle Dowie; Sandrae Farquharson	3:39.62	Saint Kitts and Nevis; Trefasana White; Vanessa Bennet; Siana Leader; Kaydeen Liburd	3:49.13	Trinidad and Tobago; Desiree Harper; Chelsi Campbell; Marrissa Gale; Sade Andrews	3:50.13

== Medal table ==
The medal count has been published.

* Host nation (Saint Kitts and Nevis)

Rank	Nation	Gold	Silver	Bronze	Total
1	Jamaica (JAM)	29	25	15	69
2	Trinidad and Tobago (TTO)	10	10	10	30
3	Bahamas (BAH)	8	3	12	23
4	Barbados (BAR)	7	10	9	26
5	Martinique (MTQ)	5	3	6	14
6	Grenada (GRN)	3	2	3	8
7	Dominica (DMA)	1	1	1	3
8	Turks and Caicos Islands (TKS)	1	1	0	2
8	U.S. Virgin Islands (VIR)	1	1	0	2
10	Antigua and Barbuda (ATG)	1	0	0	1
11	Guadeloupe (GLP)	0	4	3	7
12	Saint Kitts and Nevis (SKN)*	0	4	1	5
13	Guyana (GUY)	0	1	1	2
13	Netherlands Antilles (AHO)	0	1	1	2
15	Bermuda (BER)	0	0	1	1
15	Cayman Islands (CAY)	0	0	1	1
15	Commonwealth Games Federation (CGF)	0	0	1	1
Totals (17 entries)		66	66	65	197
