= Noelle Montcalm =

Canadian hurdler

Personal information
- Nationality: Canada
- Born: 3 April 1988 (age 38) Windsor, Ontario, Canada
- Height: 1.68 m (5 ft 6 in)
- Weight: 53 kg (117 lb)

Sport
- Sport: Track and field
- Event: 400 metres hurdles
- University team: University of Windsor
Medal record
Women's Athletics
Representing Canada
Jeux de la Francophonie
Silver medal – second place	2013 Nice	400 m hurdles
Silver medal – second place	2013 Nice	4x400 m relay
Summer Universiade
Silver medal – second place	2013 Kazan	4x400 m relay

Noelle Montcalm (born 3 April 1988) is a Canadian athlete specializing in the 400 metres hurdles. She competed at the 2013 World Championships, where she failed to qualify for the semifinals. Her personal best in the event is 55.82s, set in Edmonton in 2016. She was a member of Canada's Olympic team at the 2016 Summer Olympics in Rio de Janeiro. She subsequently competed at the 2020 Summer Olympics as well.

== Competition record ==
Year	Competition	Venue	Position	Event	Notes
Representing Canada
2010	NACAC U23 Championships	Miramar, Florida, United States	4th	100m hurdles	13.25 (wind: +2.3 m/s) w
2013	Universiade	Kazan, Russia	11th (h)	400 m hurdles	58.04
2013	Universiade	Kazan, Russia	2nd	4 × 400 m relay	3:32.93
2013	World Championships	Moscow, Russia	24th (h)	400 m hurdles	57.50
2013	World Championships	Moscow, Russia	12th (h)	4 × 400 m relay	3:31.09
2013	Jeux de la Francophonie	Nice, France	2nd	400 m hurdles	57.52
2013	Jeux de la Francophonie	Nice, France	2nd	4 × 400 m relay	3:34.25
2014	Commonwealth Games	Glasgow, United Kingdom	5th	400 m hurdles	56.74
2014	Commonwealth Games	Glasgow, United Kingdom	5th	4 × 400 m relay	3:32.45
2015	NACAC Championships	San José, Costa Rica	4th	400 m hurdles	55.98
2015	NACAC Championships	San José, Costa Rica	4th	4 × 400 m relay	3:33.65
2016	Olympic Games	Rio de Janeiro, Brazil	18th (sf)	400 m hurdles	56.28
2016	Olympic Games	Rio de Janeiro, Brazil	4th	4 × 400 m relay	3:26.43
2017	IAAF World Relays	Nassau, Bahamas	9th (h)	4 × 400 m relay	3:33.54
2017	World Championships	London, United Kingdom	33rd (h)	400 m hurdles	57.45
2018	NACAC Championships	Toronto, Canada	7th	400 m hurdles	56.97
2021	Olympic Games	Tokyo, Japan	24th (h)	400 m hurdles	55.85
2022	NACAC Championships	Freeport, Bahamas	7th	400 m hurdles	58.84
