= Anneliese Rubie =

Australian athlete

Personal information
- Born: 22 April 1992 (age 34) Canberra, Australia
- Education: University of Sydney
- Height: 1.71 m (5 ft 7 in)
- Weight: 58 kg (128 lb)

Sport
- Sport: Athletics
- Event: 400 metres
- Club: Puma
- Coached by: Peter Fortune

Anneliese Rubie (born 22 April 1992) is an Australian sprinter. Also known as Anneliese Rubie-Renshaw, she was a semi finalist at the 2016 Rio Olympics, and the 2015 World Championships in Beijing. She also ran in the semi-finals at the 2014 Commonwealth Games in Glasgow. She ran the second leg for the women's 4 × 400 m which made the Olympic final in 2016.

At the 2020 Tokyo Olympics, Rubie was a member of the Australian team that competed in the women's 4 x 400 meter relay. The team of Kendra Hubbard, Ellie Beer and Bendere Oboya finished 7th in their heat and did not contest the final.

== Early years ==
As an 18 year old in 2010 she made the semi-finals at the World Juniors. She made the semi-finals at the World University Games in 2011 and also competed at the senior 2011 World Championships.

In 2013, Rubie joined Morgan Mitchell to lead a resurgence in women's 400m and 4 × 400 m running in Australia. At the 2014 Commonwealth Games, the Australian 4 × 400 m team came fourth. In April 2015 Rubie secured an Olympic relay position at the IAAF World Relays in the Bahamas. Individually at 400m, she made the semis at the 2014 Commonwealth Games and the 2015 world championships.

== International competitions ==
Year	Competition	Venue	Position	Event	Notes
Representing Australia
2010	World Junior Championships	Moncton, Canada	15th (sf)	400 m	54.39
2010	World Junior Championships	Moncton, Canada	9th (h)	4 × 400 m relay	3:39.64
2011	Universiade	Shenzhen, China	19th (h)	400 m	54.86 (Note: Did not start in the semifinals)
2011	World Championships	Daegu, South Korea	15th (h)	4 × 400 m relay	3:32.27
2014	IAAF World Relays	Nassau, Bahamas	1st (B)	4 × 400 m relay	3:31.01
2014	Commonwealth Games	Glasgow, United Kingdom	10th (sf)	400 m	52.55
2014	Commonwealth Games	Glasgow, United Kingdom	4th	4 × 400 m relay	3:30.27
2014	Continental Cup	Marrakesh, Morocco	7th	400 m	54.33 (Note: Representing Asia-Pacific)
2014	Continental Cup	Marrakesh, Morocco	4th	4 × 400 m relay	3:36.89
2015	IAAF World Relays	Nassau, Bahamas	7th	4 × 400 m relay	3:30.03
2015	World Championships	Beijing, China	22nd (sf)	400 m	52.04
2015	World Championships	Beijing, China	12th (h)	4 × 400 m relay	3:28.61
2016	Olympic Games	Rio de Janeiro, Brazil	20th (sf)	400 m	51.96
2016	Olympic Games	Rio de Janeiro, Brazil	8th	4 × 400 m relay	3:27.45
2017	IAAF World Relays	Nassau, Bahamas	5th	4 × 400 m relay	3:28.80
2017	World Championships	London, United Kingdom	10th (h)	4 × 400 m relay	3:28.02
2018	Commonwealth Games	Gold Coast, Australia	7th	400 m	52.03
2018	Commonwealth Games	Gold Coast, Australia	5th	4 × 400 m relay	3:27.43
2021	Olympic Games	Tokyo, Japan	14th (h)	4 × 400 m relay	3:30.61

== Personal bests ==
Outdoor

- 200 metres – 23.40 (+0.7 m/s, Canberra 2018)
- 400 metres – 51.51 (Gold Coast 2018)
- 800 metres – 2:02.18 (Los Angeles 2017)
