= Ristananna Bailey-Cole =

Jamaican athlete

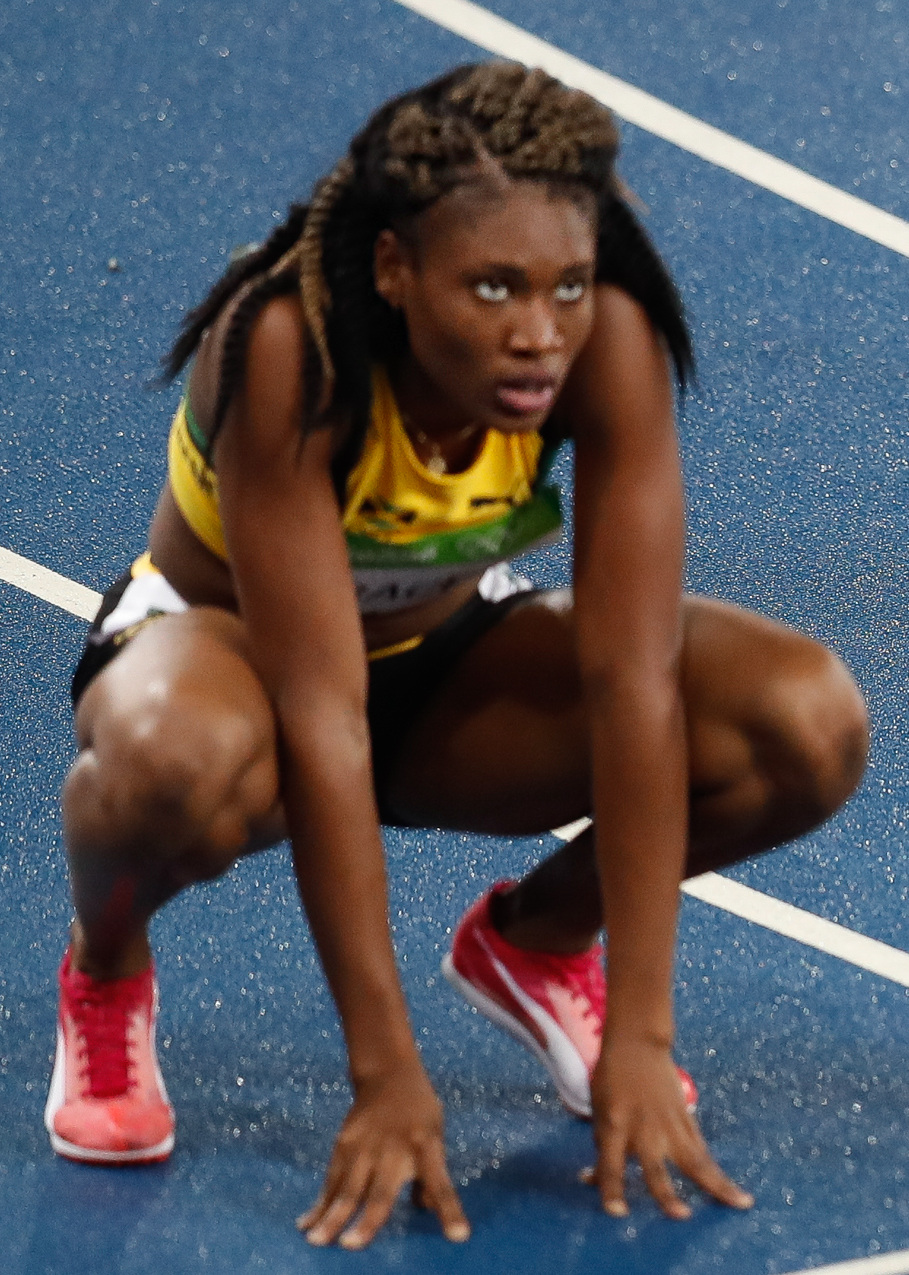
- Tracey at the 2016 Olympics

Personal information
- Born: 9 May 1992 (age 34) Kingston, Jamaica
- Height: 1.78 m (5 ft 10 in)
- Weight: 65 kg (143 lb)

Sport
- Sport: Track and field
- Event: 400 metres hurdles
- Club: Sprintec Track Club
- Coached by: Maurice Wilson
Medal record
World Championships
Bronze medal – third place	2017 London	400 m hurdles

Ristananna Bailey-Cole (née Tracey; born 9 May 1992) is a Jamaican athlete specialising in the 400 metres hurdles. She represented her country at three consecutive World Championships reaching the semifinals in 2011 and 2013. She placed fifth at the 2016 Olympics. She made her best run to date at the IAAF World Championships in London on August 10, 2017, finishing with the bronze medal in a personal best 53.74.

== International competitions ==
Year	Competition	Venue	Position	Event	Notes
Representing Jamaica
2008	CARIFTA Games (U17)	Basseterre, St. Kitts and Nevis	2nd	800 m	2:13.77
2009	CARIFTA Games (U20)	Vieux Fort, Saint Lucia	2nd	800 m	2:10.08
2009	World Youth Championships	Brixen, Italy	8th	400 m hurdles	62.90
2009	World Youth Championships	Brixen, Italy	5th	Sprint medley relay	2:09.79
2010	CARIFTA Games (U20)	George Town, Cayman Islands	1st	400 m hurdles	58.58
2010	CARIFTA Games (U20)	George Town, Cayman Islands	1st	4 × 400 m relay	3:37.15
2010	Central American and Caribbean; Junior Championships (U20)	Santo Domingo, Dominican Republic	1st	400 m hurdles	58.59
2010	Central American and Caribbean; Junior Championships (U20)	Santo Domingo, Dominican Republic	1st	4 × 400 m relay	3:34.41
2010	World Junior Championships	Moncton, Canada	5th	400 m hurdles	57.77
2011	World Championships	Daegu, South Korea	13th (sf)	400 m hurdles	55.55
2013	World Championships	Moscow, Russia	12th (sf)	400 m hurdles	55.43
2015	Pan American Games	Toronto, Canada	11th (h)	400 m hurdles	58.62
2015	World Championships	Beijing, China	30th (h)	400 m hurdles	57.60
2016	Olympic Games	Rio de Janeiro, Brazil	5th	400 m hurdles	54.15
2017	World Championships	London, United Kingdom	3rd	400 m hurdles	53.74
2018	Commonwealth Games	Gold Coast, Australia	8th	400 m hurdles	57.50

== Personal bests ==
Outdoor

- 200 metres – 23.88 (+0.7 m/s, Velenje 2011)
- 400 metres – 51.95 (Kingston 2011)
- 800 metres – 2:03.97 (Kingston 2011)
- 400 metres hurdles – 53.74 (London 2017)
