= 2009 CARIFTA Games =

XXXVIII CARIFTA Games
- Dates: April 10–13
- Host city: Vieux Fort, Saint Lucia
- Venue: George Odlum National Stadium
- Level: Junior and Youth
- Events: 66 (35 junior, (incl. 5 open); 31 youth)
- Participation: about 545 (294 junior, 251 youth) athletes from 25 nations
- Records set: 15 games records

The 38th CARIFTA Games was held in the George Odlum National Stadium in Vieux Fort, Saint Lucia, on April 10–13, 2009. Detailed reports on the results were given.

== Participation (unofficial) ==
Detailed result lists can be found on the CFPI Timing website, and on the "World Junior Athletics History" website. An unofficial count yields the number of about 545 athletes (junior (under-20) and youth (under-17)) from about 25 countries: Anguilla (5), Antigua and Barbuda (7), Aruba (14), Bahamas (58), Barbados (45), Bermuda (23), British Virgin Islands (6), Cayman Islands (12), Dominica (7), French Guiana (7), Grenada (21), Guadeloupe (19), Guyana (10), Haiti (9), Jamaica (68), Martinique (37), Montserrat (4), Netherlands Antilles (22), Saint Kitts and Nevis (30), Saint Lucia (42), Saint Vincent and the Grenadines (6), Suriname (2), Turks and Caicos (14), Trinidad and Tobago (64), US Virgin Islands (13).

== Records ==
A total of 15 new games records were set.

In the boys' U-20 category, there were 6 new records set, the most significant by Kirani James of Grenada finishing the 400 metres in 45.45 seconds, thereby gathering this years' Austin Sealy Award. The new mark for 1500 metres was set by Gavyn Nero from Trinidad and Tobago in 3:47.56, and for 5000 metres by Jamaican Kemoy Campbell in 14:40.67. Jehue Gordon from Trinidad and Tobago won the 400 m hurdles in the new record time of 50.01 seconds. On the field, Raymond Higgs from the Bahamas cleared 2.21m in high jump, whereas Quincy Wilson from Trinidad and Tobago threw the discus 55.67 metres.

The new games record in the girls' U-20 category was set by Natoya Goule of Jamaica running the 1500 metres in 4:27.48.

In the boys' U-17 category, Jahazeel Murphy of Jamaica set two new games records, one in the 200 metres in 20.97s (1.4 m/s), and the other by leading the Jamaican 4 × 100 m relay team to 40.76s.

The U-17 girls set also 6 new records: Jamaica's Shericka Jackson set the new record mark for 400 metres to 53.48s, and helped both relay teams to establish new records, 45.05s for 4 × 100 m, and 3:38:09 for 4 × 400 m. Her compatriot Janieve Russell was also member of both record relay teams, and moreover set the record for 300 metres hurdles to 41.30s. In high jump, both Peta-Gaye Reid of Jamaica and Akela Jones of Barbados cleared 1.80m equaling the games record set in 1999. Finally, the new triple jump record was set to 12.61m by Jamaica's Rochelle Farquharson.

== Austin Sealy Award ==
The Austin Sealy Trophy for the most outstanding athlete of the games was awarded to Kirani James of Grenada. He won the gold medal in the 400 metres competition in the junior (U-20) category setting the new games record to 45.45s, improving Usain Bolt's record from the year 2003, and a bronze medal with the 4 × 400 m relay team from Grenada.

== Medal summary ==
Complete results can be found on the CFPI Timing website and on the World Junior Athletics History website.

=== Boys under 20 (Junior) ===
Event	Gold		Silver		Bronze	
100 metres (4.0 m/s)	Shekeim Greaves (BAR)	10.23 w	Warren Fraser (BAH)	10.26 w	Kemar Bailey-Cole (JAM)	10.38 w
200 metres (2.3 m/s)	Nickel Ashmeade (JAM)	20.56 w	Ramone McKenzie (JAM)	20.60 w	Rachmil van Lamoen (AHO)	21.06 w
400 metres	Kirani James (GRN)	45.45 CR	Rondell Bartholomew (GRN)	45.58	Leslie Murray (ISV)	46.74
800 metres	Gavyn Nero (TRI)	1:51.75	Aaron Evans (BER)	1:52.54	Kadeem Smith (SKN)	1:54.45
1500 metres	Gavyn Nero (TRI)	3:47:56 CR	Kemoy Campbell (JAM)	3:48:18	Conroy Crossman (JAM)	3:54:52
5000 metres	Kemoy Campbell (JAM)	14:40.67 CR	Delohnni Nicol-Samuel (VIN)	15:42.51	Matthew Wright (BAR)	15:45.44
110 metres hurdles (0.7 m/s)	Jehue Gordon (TRI)	13.86	Dennis Bain (BAH)	13.93	Greggmar Swift (BAR)	14.09
400 metres hurdles	Jehue Gordon (TRI)	50.01 CR	Leslie Murray (ISV)	51.20	Dwayne Extol (JAM)	52.34
High jump	Raymond Higgs (BAH)	2.21 CR	Kareem Edwards (ATG)	2.06	Daniel Burke (BAR)	2.03
Pole vault	Shem Edwards (LCA)	3.60	Rick Valcin (LCA)	3.50	Vernal McIntosh (BAH)	3.20
Long jump	Lenyn Leonce (LCA)	7.37 (0.9 m/s)	Raymond Higgs (BAH)	7.35 (1.6 m/s)	Marlon Thompson (JAM)	7.26 (0.3 m/s)
Triple jump	Elton Walcott (TRI)	15.61 (1.0 m/s)	J'Vente Deveaux (BAH)	15.47 (0.8 m/s)	(Martinique) /Ulrick Bolosier (MTQ)	15.43 (0.1 m/s)
Shot put	Robort Collingwood (TRI)	17.49	Quincy Wilson (TRI)	17.23	Shakir Simons (GRN)	16.79
Discus throw	Quincy Wilson (TRI)	55.67 CR	Travis Smikle (JAM)	54.42	Chad Wright (JAM)	50.62
Javelin throw	Andre Bazil (DMA)	61.72	Davis Hypolite (DMA)	59.06	(Martinique) /Johan Carbety (MTQ)	58.60
Heptathlon	Darion Duncombe (BAH)	4394	Dorado Fulford (TCA)	3962	Anthony Clarke (TCA)	3577
4 x 100 metres relay	Jamaica; Kemar Bailey-Cole; Nickel Ashmeade; Darren Mitchell; Ramone McKenzie	40.05	Barbados; Rico Tull; Rachad Forde; Nicholas Deshong; Shekeim Greaves	40.62	/Martinique; David Dorail; Ludovic Vincenti; Vincent Michalet; Jossuah Brena	40.82
4 x 400 metres relay	Trinidad and Tobago; Jevon Matthew; Gavyn Nero; Kevin Haynes; Jehue Gordon	3:10.20	Jamaica; Dwayne Extol; Ricardo Powell; Sheldon Williams; Nickel Ashmeade	3:11.49	Grenada; Divon St. Paul; Rondell Bartholomew; Akim Bowen; Kirani James	3:11.93

: Open event for both junior and youth athletes.

=== Girls under 20 (Junior) ===
Event	Gold		Silver		Bronze	
100 metres (2.5 m/s)	Carrie Russell (JAM)	11.21 w	Jura Levy (JAM)	11.33 w	Allison Peter (ISV)	11.50 w
200 metres (1.5 m/s)	Jura Levy (JAM)	23.20	Nivea Smith (BAH)	23.36	Allison Peter (ISV)	23.51
400 metres	Jody-Ann Muir (JAM)	53.49	Danielle Dowie (JAM)	53.96	Alena Brooks (TRI)	54.38
800 metres	Natoya Goule (JAM)	2:09:27	Ristananna Tracey (JAM)	2:10.08	Alena Brooks (TRI)	2:10.23
1500 metres	Natoya Goule (JAM)	4:27.48 CR	Hughnique Rolle (BAH)	4:44.16	Alexis Bean (BER)	4:45.90
3000 metres	Twishana Williams (JAM)	10:18.36	Sharlene Brown (JAM)	10:31:36	Ashley Berry (BER)	10:41.33
100 metres hurdles (2.6 m/s)	Kierre Beckles (BAR)	13.31 w	Ivanique Kemp (BAH)	13.78 w	Kaymarie Jones (JAM)	13.95 w
400 metres hurdles	Nikita Tracey (JAM)	57.79	Danielle Dowie (JAM)	57.88	Latoya Griffith (BAR)	59.05
High jump	Shanieka Thomas (JAM)	1.70	Jeanelle Ovid (TRI)	1.70	Shinelle Procter (AIA)	1.70
Long jump	(Martinique) /Daniella Sacama-Isidore (MTQ)	6.21 (0.3 m/s)	(Guadeloupe) /Karene Rebus (GLP)	6.07 w (4.9 m/s)	Yushani Durant (JAM)	5.99 w (3.9 m/s)
Triple jump	Sandisha Antoine (LCA)	12.91 w (4.1 m/s)	(Guadeloupe) /Cynthia Battah-Aoufoh (GLP)	12.54 w (3.8 m/s)	Yushani Durant (JAM)	12.07 w (2.7 m/s)
Shot put	Micara Vassell (JAM)	14.03	Hilenn James (TRI)	13.80	(Martinique) /Anne-Caroline Ducados (MTQ)	13.12
Discus throw	Candicea Bernard (JAM)	47.09	Ashlee Smith (TRI)	42.54	Akeela Bravo (TRI)	42.10
Javelin throw	(Martinique) /Myriam Sacama-Isidore (MTQ)	41.43	(Martinique) /Laure Mongin (MTQ)	38.98	Tesril Nisbett (SKN)	37.89
Pentathlon	(Martinique) /Audelia Da Veiga (MTQ)	3643	Makeba Alcide (LCA)	3534	Annmarie Duffus (JAM)	3382
4 x 100 metres relay	Jamaica; Celia Walters; Jura Levy; Samantha Elliot; Carrie Russell	45.04	Bahamas; V'Alonee Robinson; Ivanique Kemp; Gortia Farguson; Nivea Smith	45.43	Trinidad and Tobago; Deborah John; Cadajah Spencer; Kai Selvon; Avernelle Pierre	46.97
4 x 400 metres relay	Jamaica; Jody-Ann Muir; Nikita Tracey; Danielle Dowie; Natoya Goule	3:36.21	Barbados; Sade Sealy; Kierre Beckles; Mara Weekes; Latoya Griffith	3:41.75	Bahamas; Devanique Dean; Katherina Smith; Shaunae Miller; Deshana Burnside	3:45.99

: Open event for both junior and youth athletes.

=== Boys under 17 (Youth) ===
Event	Gold		Silver		Bronze	
100 metres (2.0 m/s)	Jahazeel Murphy (JAM)	10.41	Johnathan Farquharson (BAH)	10.59	Jonathan Holder (TRI)	10.62
200 metres (1.4 m/s)	Jahazeel Murphy (JAM)	20.97 CR	Jonathan Holder (TRI)	21.36	Delano Williams (TCA)	21.62
400 metres	Jermaine Fyffe (JAM)	47.96	Shaquille Alleyne (BAR)	48.13	Jovan Williams (JAM)	48.85
800 metres	Waquar DaCosta (JAM)	1:55.70	Antonio Mascoll (BAR)	1:56.32	Jerrard Mason (BAR)	1:57.13
1500 metres	Waquar DaCosta (JAM)	4:05.02	Ricardo Martin (GUY)	4:06.05	Trey Simons (BER)	4:06.56
3000 metres	Rolstan Pamphile (LCA)	9:03.16	Trey Simons (BER)	9:07.39	Mark London (TRI)	9:12.27
100 metres hurdles (-0.3 m/s)	Stefan Fennell (JAM)	13.00	Raphael Jordan (BAR)	13.26	Patrick Bodie (BAH)	13.45
400 metres hurdles	Tramaine Maloney (BAR)	54.88	Patrick Bodie (BAH)	55.48	Kyle Robinson (JAM)	55.59
High jump	Kemar Jones (BAR)	2.00	Ryan Ingraham (BAH)	1.95	Jabari Wilmott (BAH)	1.95
Long jump	Julian Forte (JAM)	7.25 (2.0 m/s)	Atiba Wright (TRI)	6.73 (-0.1 m/s)	(Guadeloupe) /Wilfried Yeye (GLP)	6.66 (0.1 m/s)
Triple jump	Julian Forte (JAM)	14.77 (1.6 m/s)	Lathone Collie-Minns (BAH)	14.58 (1.4 m/s)	Lathario Collie-Minns (BAH)	14.39 (-0.1 m/s)
Shot put	Ashinia Miller (JAM)	16.62	Shervorne Worrell (TRI)	14.27	Lyndon Toussaint (GRN)	13.90
Discus throw	Ashinia Miller (JAM)	49.21	Lyndon Toussaint (GRN)	45.27	Kyle Preudhomme (TRI)	40.65
Javelin throw	Keshorn Walcott (TRI)	59.30	Andwele Korede (TRI)	53.59	Byron Ferguson (BAH)	52.99
4 x 100 metres relay	Jamaica; Adam Cummings; Odean Skeen; Travis Drummond; Jahazeel Murphy	40.76 CR	Bahamas; Rashad Armbrister; Harold Carter; Blake Bartlett; Johnathan Farquharson	41.89	Barbados; Raphael Jordan; Deon Hope; Shaquille Alleyne; Shaquille Hollingsworth	42.18
4 x 400 metres relay	Jamaica; Jovan Williams; Jermaine Fyffe; Waquar Dacosta; Earl Grant	3:16.53	Trinidad and Tobago; Kory Woods; Jonathan Holder; Kyle Griffith; Darvin Sandy	3:18.76	Grenada; Che Mason; Ashkley Gittens; Aleigh McIntyre; Reyss Albert	3:24.55

=== Girls under 17 (Youth) ===
Event	Gold		Silver		Bronze	
100 metres (3.1 m/s)	Deandre Whitehorne (JAM)	11.38 w	Shericka Moulton (JAM)	11.69 w	Chantelle Morrison (CAY)	11.69 w
200 metres (-0.4 m/s)	Shericka Jackson (JAM)	23.62	Anthonique Strachan (BAH)	23.95	Rashan Brown (BAH)	23.97
400 metres	Shericka Jackson (JAM)	53.48 CR	Rashan Brown (BAH)	53.93	Marissa Gale (TRI)	55.28
800 metres	Chris Ann Gordon (JAM)	2:11.43	Shani Adams (BAR)	2:13.22	Sonia Gaskin (BAR)	2:13.80
1500 metres	Jevina Straker (GUY)	4:42.89	Petrene Plummer (JAM)	4:43.65	Janella Jonas (GUY)	4:45.05
100 metres hurdles (-1.3 m/s)	Keenan Davis (JAM)	14.15	Sade-Mariah Greenidge (BAR)	14.20	Tatianna Wolfe (JAM)	14.35
300 metres hurdles	Janieve Russell (JAM)	41.30 CR	Sade-Mariah Greenidge (BAR)	42.81	Aimée Adamis (MTQ)	43.21
High jump	Peta-Gaye Reid (JAM)	1.80 CR=	Akela Jones (BAR)	1.80 CR=	Janieve Russell (JAM)	1.77
Long jump	Janieve Russell (JAM)	6.06 (1.9 m/s)	Chanice Porter (JAM)	6.05 w (4.2 m/s)	Akela Jones (BAR)	5.85 w (2.1 m/s)
Triple jump	Rochelle Farquharson (JAM)	12.61 CR (1.7 m/s)	Tamara Myers (BAH)	11.70 w (2.7 m/s)	Akeila Richardson (BER)	11.56 (1.0 m/s)
Shot put	Racquel Williams (BAH)	11.93	Sasha-Gaye Marston (JAM)	11.75	(Martinique) /Catherine Mastail (MTQ)	11.09
Discus throw	Sasha Gaye Marston (JAM)	39.64	Kellion Knibb (JAM)	39.19	Annestesia Daire (TRI)	35.90
Javelin throw	(French Guiana) /Alexie Alaïs (GUF)	38.08	Kellion Knibb (JAM)	35.76	(French Guiana) /Jocelyne Violanes (GUF)	35.37
4 x 100 metres relay	Jamaica; Janieve Russell; Deandre Whitehorne; Shericka Moulton; Shericka Jackson	45.05 CR	Trinidad and Tobago; Breanna Gomes; Gabriela Cumberbatch; Shenice Walkes; Janae Alexander	46.44	Bahamas; Anthonique Strachan; Shaunae Miller; Sparkyl Cash; Printassia Johnson	47.04
4 x 400 metres relay	Jamaica; Janieve Russell; Shericka Jackson; Deandre Whitehorne; Chris Ann Gordon	3:38:09 CR	Bahamas; Teshon Adderley; Rashan Brown; Bianca Farrington; Katrina Seymour	3:45.61	Trinidad and Tobago; Domonique Williams; Marrissa Gale; Kernesha Spann; Gabriela Cumberbatch	3:50.61

== Medal table ==
* Host nation (Saint Lucia)

Rank	Nation	Gold	Silver	Bronze	Total
1	Jamaica (JAM)	39	15	13	67
2	Trinidad and Tobago (TTO)	9	10	10	29
3	Barbados (BAR)	4	9	8	21
4	Saint Lucia (LCA)*	4	2	0	6
5	Bahamas (BAH)	3	17	8	28
6	/Martinique	3	1	6	10
7	Grenada (GRN)	1	2	4	7
8	Guyana (GUY)	1	1	1	3
9	Dominica (DMA)	1	1	0	2
10	/French Guiana	1	0	1	2
11	Bermuda (BER)	0	2	4	6
12	/Guadeloupe	0	2	1	3
13	U.S. Virgin Islands (VIR)	0	1	3	4
14	Turks and Caicos Islands (TKS)	0	1	2	3
15	Antigua and Barbuda (ATG)	0	1	0	1
15	Saint Vincent and the Grenadines (VIN)	0	1	0	1
17	Saint Kitts and Nevis (SKN)	0	0	2	2
18	Cayman Islands (CAY)	0	0	1	1
18	Commonwealth Games Federation (CGF)	0	0	1	1
18	Netherlands Antilles (AHO)	0	0	1	1
Totals (20 entries)		66	66	66	198
