= Johnathan Farquharson =

Bahamian sprinter

Personal information
- Born: 3 February 1993 (age 33) Freeport, Bahamas

Sport
- Sport: Track and field
Medal record
Athletics
Representing Bahamas
CARIFTA Games Junior (U20)
Gold medal – first place	2012 Hamilton	4×100 m relay
CARIFTA Games Youth (U17)
Gold medal – first place	2008 Basseterre	4x100 m relay
Silver medal – second place	2009 Vieux Fort	100 m
Silver medal – second place	2009 Vieux Fort	4x100 m relay

Jonathan Farquharson (born February 3, 1993) is a Bahamian sprinter from Grand Bahama who mainly competes in the 100m. He attended Bishop Michael Eldon School and Orlando Christian Prep before competing for the Abilene Christian Wildcats.

He won double silver in the under 17 100m and the 4 × 100 m relay at the 2009 Carifta Games in Saint Lucia. He also won gold in the 4 × 100 m relay at the 2008 Carifta Games in the Saint Kitts and Nevis. He competed at the IAAF World U18 Championships without making the final in the 100m respectively. He ran the 4 × 100 m relay at the 2015 Pan American Games in Toronto, Canada.

== Personal bests ==
Event	Time	Venue	Date
100 m	10.38 (+1.5)	Conway, South Carolina	March 10, 2014
200 m	20.68 (+1.6)	Norman, Oklahoma	April 18, 2015
60m	6.75 (indoor)	Albuquerque, New Mexico	February 9, 2013
