= Jehue Gordon =

Trinidadian track and field athlete (born 1991)

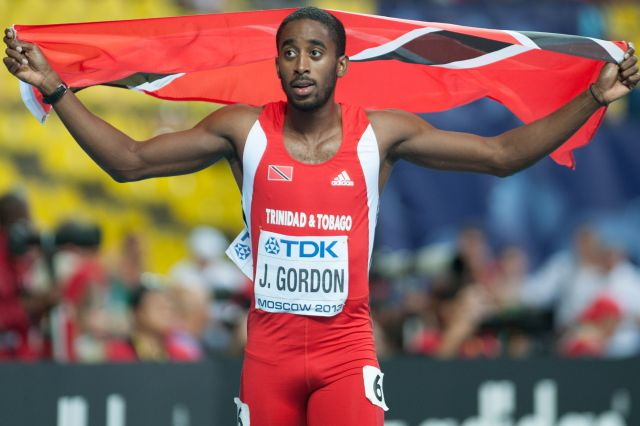
- Gordon at the 2013 World Championships in Athletics

Personal information
- Nationality: Trinidad and Tobago
- Born: 15 December 1991 (age 34)
- Height: 1.88 m (6 ft 2 in)
- Weight: 81 kg (179 lb)

Sport
- Sport: hurdles
- Event: 200 metres hurdles

Achievements and titles
- Personal bests: 400 m: 46.43 s (Marabella 2010); 400 m h: 47.69 s (Moscow 2013)
Medal record
World Championships
Gold medal – first place	2013 Moscow	400 m hurdles
World Junior Championships
Gold medal – first place	2010 Moncton	400 m hurdles
Pan American Games
Gold medal – first place	2015 Toronto	4 × 400 m relay
CAC Championships
Bronze medal – third place	2009 Havana	400 m hurdles

Jehue Gordon (born 15 December 1991) is a Trinidadian track and field athlete who specialises in the 400 metres hurdles. He turned professional on 24 June 2010, and signed a deal with Adidas in August 2010.

== Career ==
Formerly a pupil of Belmont Boys' Secondary R.C. School and Queen's Royal College in Port of Spain, he began his international athletics career at the 2008 World Junior Championships in Athletics, where he finished fifth in the semi-finals at the age of 16. He was the bronze medallist in the 400 m hurdles at the 2008 CARIFTA Games and went on to win the gold medal the following year, recording a championship record of 50.01 seconds. His success continued in the form of a bronze medal at the 2009 Central American and Caribbean Championships in Athletics, where he ran a time of 49.45 seconds, and a silver at the 2009 Pan American Junior Athletics Championships.

He qualified for the 2009 World Championships in Athletics and surprised by setting a world-age best and senior national record of 48.66 seconds in the heats. He progressed through the rounds and reached the final, finishing in fourth with a 48.26-second national record. Statisticians A. Lennart Julin and Mirko Jalava picked out Gordon's performances as sign of promise for future success. At the start of the 2010 season, he took a 400 m and 110 metres hurdles double at the trials for the CARIFTA Games. He went on to improve the championship records in both the 110 and 400 m hurdles at the 2010 CARIFTA Games, earning himself that year's Austin Sealy Trophy.

He took part in both the 2012 and 2016 Summer Olympics.

When he won the 400 m hurdles at the 2013 World Championships, he set a new national record of 47.69. The year after, he won silver at the 2014 Commonwealth Games.

Gordon holds the position of General Secretary at the National Association of Athletics Administrations of Trinidad and Tobago (NAAATT) since late 2025 to lead organizational development and present national honors at award events. He now works in sports administration after using his World Champion background to establish new governance systems for the federation.

== International competitions ==
Year	Competition	Venue	Position	Event	Notes
Representing Trinidad and Tobago
2008	CARIFTA Games (U-20)	Basseterre, Saint Kitts and Nevis	3rd	400 m hurdles	53.18
2008	World Junior Championships	Bydgoszcz, Poland	15th (sf)	400 m hurdles	52.26
2008	World Junior Championships	Bydgoszcz, Poland	4th (h)	4 × 400 m relay	3:07.60
2009	CARIFTA Games (U-20)	Vieux Fort, Saint Lucia	1st	110 m hurdles	13.86 (+0.7 m/s)
2009	CARIFTA Games (U-20)	Vieux Fort, Saint Lucia	1st	400 m hurdles	50.01 CR
2009	CARIFTA Games (U-20)	Vieux Fort, Saint Lucia	1st	4 × 400 m relay	3:10.20
2009	World Championships	Berlin, Germany	4th	400 m hurdles	48.26 NR
2010	CARIFTA Games (U-20)	George Town, Cayman Islands	1st	110 m hurdles	13.41 CR (+1.3 m/s)
2010	CARIFTA Games (U-20)	George Town, Cayman Islands	1st	400 m hurdles	49.76 CR
2010	CARIFTA Games (U-20)	George Town, Cayman Islands	3rd	4 × 400 m relay	3:11.59
2010	Central American and Caribbean; Junior Championships (U-20)	Santo Domingo, Dominican Republic	1st	400 m hurdles	50.26 CR
2010	Central American and Caribbean; Junior Championships (U-20)	Santo Domingo, Dominican Republic	1st	4 × 400 m relay	3:08.19
2010	World Junior Championships	Moncton, New Brunswick, Canada	1st	400 m hurdles	49.30
2011	Central American and Caribbean Championships	Mayagüez, Puerto Rico	3rd	400 m hurdles	50.10
2011	World Championships	Daegu, South Korea	9th (sf)	400 m hurdles	49.08
2012	Olympic Games	London, United Kingdom	6th	400 m hurdles	48.86
2013	World Championships	Moscow, Russia	1st	400 m hurdles	47.69 NR
2013	World Championships	Moscow, Russia	6th	4 × 400 m relay	3:01.74
2014	Commonwealth Games	Glasgow, United Kingdom	2nd	400 m hurdles	48.75
2015	World Championships	Beijing, China	31st (h)	400 m hurdles	49.91
2016	Olympic Games	Rio de Janeiro, Brazil	35th (h)	400 m hurdles	49.98
2018	Central American and Caribbean Games	Barranquilla, Colombia	8th	400 m hurdles	50.02
2018	NACAC Championships	Toronto, Canada	7th	400 m hurdles	50.12
