= Julian Forte =

Jamaican track and field sprinter

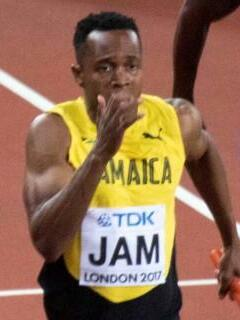

Personal information
- Born: 7 January 1993 (age 33) Saint Andrew Parish, Jamaica

Sport
- Sport: Track and field
Medal record
Representing Jamaica
IAAF World Relays
Gold medal – first place	2014 Nassau	4×100 m relay
Commonwealth Games
Gold medal – first place	2014 Glasgow	4x100 m relay

Julian Forte (born 7 January 1993) is a Jamaican track and field sprinter. His personal bests are 9.91 seconds for the 100 metres and 19.97 seconds for the 200 metres.

Originally a horizontal jumps specialist, he won the long jump and triple jump titles at the 2009 CARIFTA Games. He took the sprint double at the 2010 Jamaican High School Championships and went on to be a 200 m finalist at the 2012 World Junior Championships in Athletics. He won his first senior medal at the 2014 IAAF World Relays, taking gold with the Jamaican 4×100 metres relay team.

== Career ==
=== Early life and high school ===
Born in Saint Andrew Parish, Jamaica, he first began running at Vaz Preparatory School in Kingston. Encouraged by his school coach, and inspired by the feats of Michael Johnson, he continued to focus on sprinting. Forte also competed in the long jump and in 2008 set a personal best of 6.90 m (22 ft 7 1/2 in) and came third at the Jamaican High School Championships. His first international competition came at the 2008 CARIFTA Games, where he was eighth in the long jump and third in the triple jump. He attended Wolmer's Boys' High School and in 2009, at the age of sixteen, he set personal bests of 10.75 seconds for the 100 metres and 21.93 seconds for the 200 metres. At the 2009 CARIFTA Games he won the gold medal in the long jump, clearing 7.25 m (23 ft 9 1/4 in), as well as the triple jump with 14.77 m (48 ft 5 1/4 in).

The following year he changed his focus to the sprints. He took the 100 m and 200 m titles at the Jamaican High School Championships, helping Wolmer's to the team title, and vowed to stay training in Jamaica in the hope of emulating Usain Bolt. He came sixth over 200 m at the 2010 CARIFTA Games, one place behind his older compatriot Kemar Bailey-Cole. He was disappointed not to be selected for the 2010 Summer Youth Olympics, but won a silver medal for Jamaica in the 4×100 metres relay at the 2010 Central American and Caribbean Junior Championships. He ended 2010 with sprint bests of 10.49 seconds for the 100 m and 21.04 seconds for the 200 m. He did not perform well in 2011, placing outside the top five at the high school champs sprint events. In his last year as a junior athlete he ran personal bests of 10.19 seconds for the 100 m and 20.38 seconds for the 200 m. Over 200 m he won the national junior title, placed sixth at the Jamaican Athletics Championships, and came eighth at the 2012 World Junior Championships in Athletics.

=== Senior competition ===
Continuing with his studies he enrolled at University of Technology, Jamaica, taking advantage of the institution's sports facilities. In his first outing of 2013, he ran a personal best of 10.13 m to win in Kingston. He experienced his first IAAF Diamond League meeting at the British Grand Prix in June, although he placed last. In Sundsvall, Sweden he dipped under ten seconds with a wind-assisted time of 9.98 seconds. A personal best of 10.12 seconds came during a win at the Athletics Bridge, which he followed with another win at the Palio Citta della Quercia. He opened 2014 with a 400 metres best of 47.18 seconds, before improving his 100 m time to 10.03 seconds. This performance gained him selection for the 2014 IAAF World Relays – the debut edition of the competition. He ran the third leg to help Jamaica to a world-leading 37.71 seconds in the heats and then the gold medal in the final.

== Personal bests ==
- 100 metres – 9.91 seconds (2017)
- 200 metres – 19.97 seconds (2016)
- 400 metres – 47.18 seconds (2014)
- Long jump – 7.25 m (23 ft 9 1/4 in)
- Triple jump – 14.77 m (48 ft 5 1/4 in)

== International competition record ==
Year	Competition	Venue	Position	Event	Notes
2008	CARIFTA Games (U-17)	Basseterre, Saint Kitts and Nevis	8th	Long jump	
2008	CARIFTA Games (U-17)	Basseterre, Saint Kitts and Nevis	3rd	Triple jump	
2009	CARIFTA Games (U-17)	Vieux Fort, Saint Lucia	1st	Long jump	
2009	CARIFTA Games (U-17)	Vieux Fort, Saint Lucia	1st	Triple jump	
2010	CARIFTA Games (U-20)	George Town, Cayman Islands	6th	200 metres	
2010	CARIFTA Games (U-20)	George Town, Cayman Islands	1st	4×100 m relay	
2010	Central American and Caribbean Junior Championships (U-20)	Santo Domingo, Dominican Republic	2nd	4×100 m relay	
2012	World Junior Championships	Barcelona, Spain	8th	200 metres	
2014	IAAF World Relays	Nassau, Bahamas	1st	4×100 m relay	
2015	World Championships	Beijing, China	23rd (h)	200 m	20.57
2017	World Championships	London, United Kingdom	11th (sf)	100 m	10.13
2017	World Championships	London, United Kingdom	—	4×100 m relay	DNF
