= Stacey-Ann Smith =

American sprinter

Stacey-Ann Smith (born January 8, 1991) is a female sprinter. She was a member of Team USA at the 2014 Penn Relays USA vs The World 4 × 100 relay, in which her team won the silver medal. Smith was also selected for the 2014 USA World Relay Team for the 4 × 100 meter relay. She is a graduate of the University of Texas, where she was a four-time All-American Sprinter. In 2010, Smith finished 4th in the World Junior Championship 400 m final and was part of the Gold Medal–winning US relay team. Smith has a personal best of 23.27 for the 200 m and 52.83 for the 400 m.

Smith also represented the University of Texas on its soccer team.
