= Diamond Dixon =

American track and field athlete

Personal information
- Full name: Diamond Brittany Dixon
- Born: June 29, 1992 (age 33) El Paso, Texas, U.S.
- Height: 5 ft 6 in (1.68 m)
- Weight: 112 lb (51 kg)

Sport
- Country: United States
- Sport: Athletics
- Event: 4 × 400 m Relay
Medal record
Olympic Games
Gold medal – first place	2012 London	4 × 400 m relay

Diamond Brittany Dixon (born June 29, 1992 in El Paso, Texas) is an American track and field athlete. She won a gold medal at the 2012 Summer Olympics in London as a member of the 4 × 400 m relay team. While she was not a member of the relay team who ran in the medal race, she took part in the race which qualified the American team for the final. Under Olympic rules, all runners who took part in qualification races also earn medals. While at the University of Kansas, she won the 2013 Big 12 Conference championships in the 400 m, 4 × 100 m relay, and 4 × 400 m relay. While running for Westside High School, she was the 2009 and 2010 Texas state champion in the 400 meters.

Dixon grew up in Houston, Texas. She walked or ran a distance of 4–5 miles (6.4–8.0 km) to and from school at age 10, due to living too far for a school bus to pick her up. The daily routine served as training for her eventual Olympic debut.
