= Caitlin Sargent-Jones =

Australian sprinter

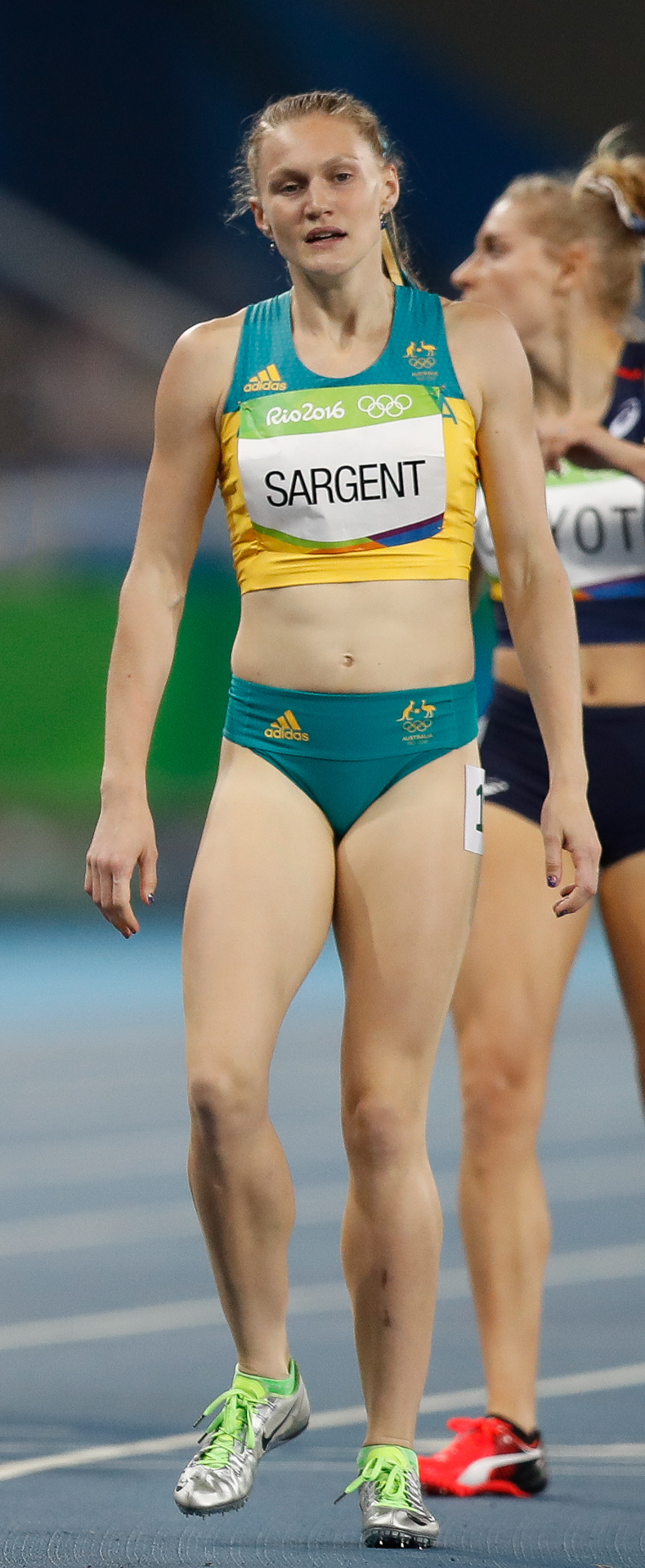
- Sargent-Jones at the 2016 Olympics

Personal information
- Born: 14 June 1992 (age 34) Brisbane, Australia
- Height: 1.71 m (5 ft 7 in)
- Weight: 60 kg (132 lb)

Sport
- Sport: Athletics
- Event: 100–400 m
- Club: University of Queensland
- Coached by: Eric Brown

Achievements and titles
- Personal best(s): 100 m – 11.73 (2009); 200 m – 23.67 (2009); 400 m – 52.16 (2013)

Caitlin Sargent-Jones (born 14 June 1992) is an Australian sprinter. She competed in the 4 × 400 m relay at the 2016 Olympics.
