= Chanice Chase-Taylor =

Canadian hurdler (born 1993)

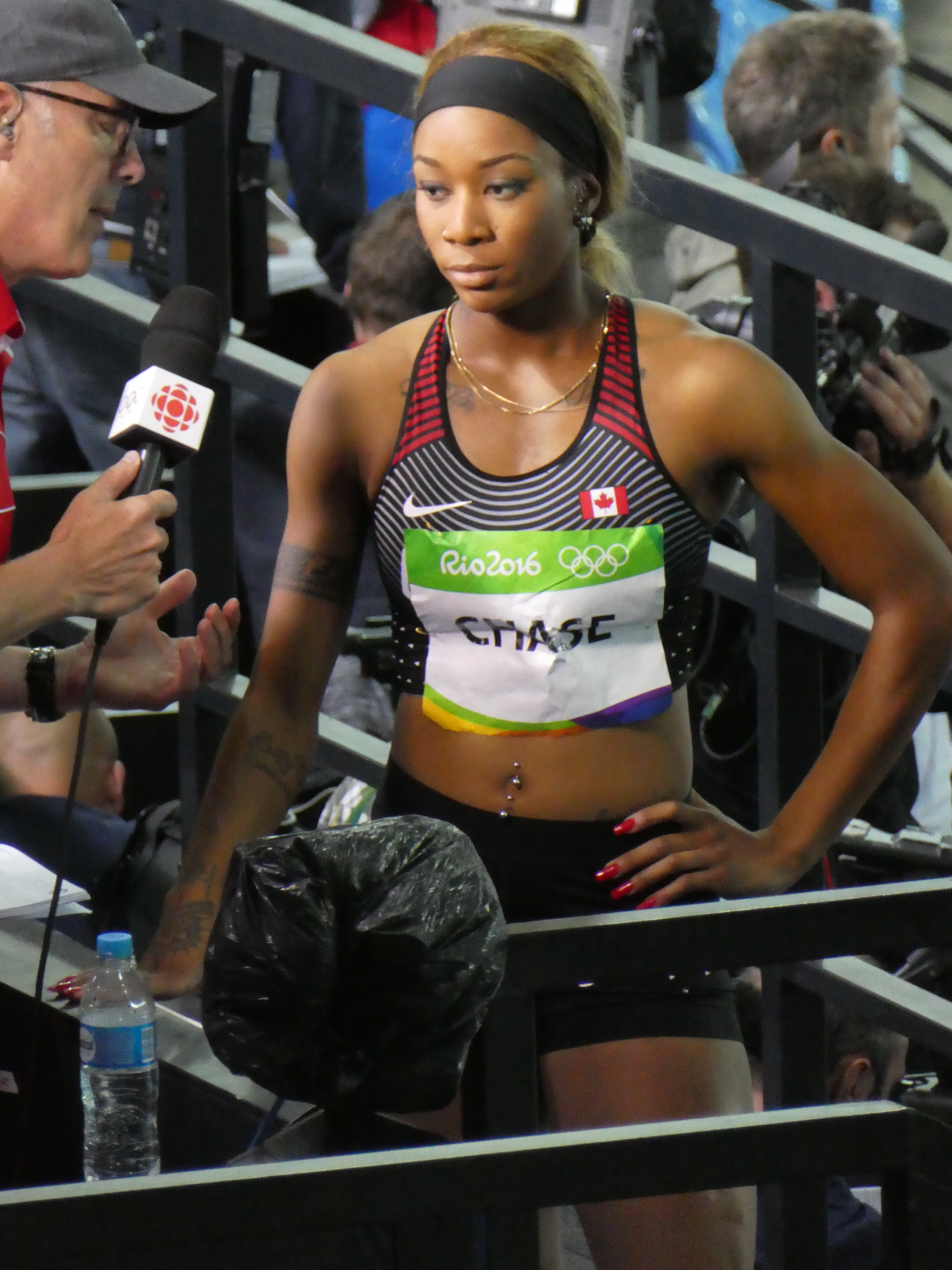

Personal information
- Born: August 6, 1993 (age 32) Toronto, Ontario
- Height: 173 cm (5 ft 8 in)
- Weight: 61 kg (134 lb)

Sport
- Country: Canada
- Sport: Athletics
- Event: Hurdles

Achievements and titles
- Personal best(s): 100 hurdles = 12.94; 400 hurdles = 54.94

Chanice Chase-Taylor (born August 6, 1993 in Toronto, Ontario) is a Canadian track and field athlete competing in the hurdles.

In July 2016, she was officially named to Canada's Olympic team in the 400 metre hurdles and 4x400 meters relay events.

Chase-Taylor is Majoring in sport administration with a concentration in sport leadership at Louisiana State University.
