= Athletics at the 2015 African Games – Women's 400 metres hurdles =

The women's 400 metres hurdles event at the 2015 African Games was held on 16 and 17 September.

== Medalists ==
Gold	Silver	Bronze
Amaka Ogoegbunam; Nigeria	Ajoke Odumosu; Nigeria	Lilianne Klaasman; Namibia

== Results ==
=== Heats ===
Qualification: First 3 in each heat (Q) and the next 2 fastest (q) advanced to the final.

Rank	Heat	Name	Nationality	Time	Notes
1	1	Ajoke Odumosu	Nigeria	57.31	Q
2	2	Amaka Ogoegbunam	Nigeria	58.46	Q
3	1	Lilianne Klaasman	Namibia	59.10	Q
4	2	Audrey Nkamsao	Cameroon	59.32	Q
5	1	Jerioth Wanjiku	Kenya	59.83	Q
6	2	Olga Razanamalala	Madagascar	1:00.30	Q
7	2	Rokya Fofana	Burkina Faso	1:00.51	q
8	1	Annerie Ebersohn	South Africa	1:01.02	q
9	2	Priscillah Tabunda	Kenya	1:01.77	
10	2	Karkour Saf	Sudan	1:01.90	
11	1	Eleni Demelesh	Ethiopia	1:04.45	

=== Final ===
Rank	Lane	Name	Nationality	Time	Notes
1st place, gold medalist(s)	7	Amaka Ogoegbunam	Nigeria	55.86	
2nd place, silver medalist(s)	6	Ajoke Odumosu	Nigeria	57.63	
3rd place, bronze medalist(s)	4	Lilianne Klaasman	Namibia	58.68	NR
4	2	Annerie Ebersohn	South Africa	58.68	
5	5	Audrey Nkamsao	Cameroon	59.18	
6	8	Jerioth Wanjiku	Kenya	59.78	
7	9	Olga Razanamalala	Madagascar	1:00.16	
8	3	Rokya Fofana	Burkina Faso	1:00.72	
