= 2008 African Championships in Athletics – Women's 400 metres hurdles =

The women's 400 metres hurdles event at the 2008 African Championships in Athletics was held at the Addis Ababa Stadium on May 3–May 4.

== Medalists ==
Gold	Silver	Bronze
Muizat Ajoke Odumosu; Nigeria	Lamiae Lhabze; Morocco	Aïssata Soulama; Burkina Faso

== Results ==
=== Heats ===
Qualification: First 3 of each heat (Q) and the next 2 fastest (q) qualified for the final.

Rank	Heat	Name	Nationality	Time	Notes
1	1	Lamiae Lhabze	Morocco	57.05	Q
2	2	Aïssata Soulama	Burkina Faso	57.20	Q
3	2	Muizat Ajoke Odumosu	Nigeria	57.40	Q
4	2	Carole Kaboud Mebam	Cameroon	57.95	Q
5	2	Faiza Omar	Sudan	57.98	q
6	2	Hanane Skhyi	Morocco	58.05	q
7	2	Jacqueline Ado Bludo	Ghana	1:00.42	
8	1	Mame Fatou Faye	Senegal	1:00.87	Q
9	1	Weynua Welde	Ethiopia	1:01.04	Q
10	1	Mindaye Lema	Ethiopia	1:04.60	
11	2	Tigst Getnet	Ethiopia	1:05.07	
	1	Muna Jabir Adam	Sudan	DNF	
	1	Florence Wasike	Kenya	DNS	
	1	Janet Wienand	South Africa	DNS	

=== Final ===
Rank	Lane	Name	Nationality	Time	Notes
1st place, gold medalist(s)	3	Muizat Ajoke Odumosu	Nigeria	55.92	
2nd place, silver medalist(s)	5	Lamiae Lhabze	Morocco	56.07	
3rd place, bronze medalist(s)	4	Aïssata Soulama	Burkina Faso	56.13	
4	2	Hanane Skhyi	Morocco	57.13	
5	8	Carole Kaboud Mebam	Cameroon	57.47	
6	6	Mame Fatou Faye	Senegal	58.33	
7	1	Faiza Omar	Sudan	58.56	
8	7	Weynua Welde	Ethiopia	1:01.18	
