= 2006 European Athletics Championships – Women's 400 metres =

European athletics competition

Women's 400 metres at the European Athletics Championships
- Venue: Ullevi
- Location: Gothenburg, Sweden
- Dates: 8, 9, and 10 August 2006
- Winning time: 49.85 s

Medalists
gold medal	Vania Stambolova	Bulgaria
silver medal	Tatyana Veshkurova	Russia
bronze medal	Olga Zaytseva	Russia

The women's 400 metres at the 2006 European Athletics Championships were held at the Ullevi on 8, 9 and 10 August.

== Schedule ==
Date	Time	Round
8 August 2006	10:55	Round 1
9 August 2006	19:05	Semifinals
10 August 2006	18:50	Final

== Results ==
KEY:	q	Fastest non-qualifiers	Q	Qualified	NR	National record	PB	Personal best	SB	Seasonal best

=== Round 1 ===
Qualification: First 3 in each heat (Q) and the next 4 fastest (q) advance to the semifinals.

Rank	Heat	Name	Nationality	Time	Notes
1	2	Vania Stambolova	Bulgaria	50.39	Q
2	1	Olga Zaytseva	Russia	50.89	Q
3	4	Tatyana Veshkurova	Russia	51.01	Q
4	2	Ilona Usovich	Belarus	51.34	Q
5	1	Joanne Cuddihy	Ireland	51.41	Q
6	3	Svetlana Pospelova	Russia	51.69	Q
7	4	Nicola Sanders	United Kingdom	51.80	Q
8	2	Nataliya Pyhyda	Ukraine	51.98	Q
9	1	Marilyn Okoro	United Kingdom	52.02	Q, PB
10	3	Mariyana Dimitrova	Bulgaria	52.04	Q
11	2	Daniela Reina	Italy	52.07	q, PB
12	4	Danijela Grgić	Croatia	52.15	Q
13	2	Grażyna Prokopek	Poland	52.21	q, SB
14	1	Barbara Petráhn	Hungary	52.30	q
15	3	Solene Desert	France	52.32	Q
16	3	Claudia Hoffmann	Germany	52.55	q
17	4	Romara van Noort	Netherlands	52.64	PB
18	2	Klodiana Shala	Albania	52.86	NR
19	1	Jitka Bartoničková	Czech Republic	52.91	PB
20	3	Dimitra Dova	Greece	53.24	
21	1	Lena Aruhn	Sweden	53.28	
22	3	Kirsi Mykkänen	Finland	53.34	
23	1	Phara Anacharsis	France	53.43	
24	2	Beatrice Dahlgren	Sweden	53.52	
24	4	Thélia Sigère	France	53.52	
26	4	Nedyalka Nedkova	Bulgaria	53.69	

=== Semifinals ===
First 4 of each Semifinal will be directly qualified (Q) for the Final.

==== Semifinal 1 ====
Rank	Lane	Name	Nationality	React	Time	Notes
1	6	Vania Stambolova	Bulgaria	0.232	49.69	Q, EL
2	4	Ilona Usovich	Belarus	0.181	50.74	Q, NR
3	5	Svetlana Pospelova	Russia	0.136	50.96	Q
4	3	Nicola Sanders	United Kingdom	0.182	51.25	Q
5	2	Daniela Reina	Italy	0.213	52.13	
6	7	Claudia Hoffmann	Germany	0.191	52.27	
7	1	Nataliya Pyhyda	Ukraine	0.291	52.36	
8	8	Solene Desert	France	0.186	53.06	

==== Semifinal 2 ====
Rank	Lane	Name	Nationality	React	Time	Notes
1	3	Olga Zaytseva	Russia	0.187	50.49	Q
2	4	Tatyana Veshkurova	Russia	0.221	50.87	Q
3	5	Joanne Cuddihy	Ireland	0.204	51.09	Q, PB
4	6	Mariyana Dimitrova	Bulgaria	0.184	51.23	Q
5	1	Danijela Grgić	Croatia	0.181	52.00	
6	7	Barbara Petráhn	Hungary	0.180	52.46	
7	2	Grażyna Prokopek	Poland	0.276	52.66	
8	8	Marilyn Okoro	United Kingdom	0.173	52.94	

=== Final ===
Rank	Lane	Name	Nationality	Time	Notes
1st place, gold medalist(s)	4	Vania Stambolova	Bulgaria	49.85	
2nd place, silver medalist(s)	3	Tatyana Veshkurova	Russia	50.15	
3rd place, bronze medalist(s)	6	Olga Zaytseva	Russia	50.28	
4	7	Mariyana Dimitrova	Bulgaria	50.64	PB
5	5	Ilona Usovich	Belarus	50.69	NR
6	2	Nicola Sanders	United Kingdom	50.87	
7	8	Svetlana Pospelova	Russia	50.90	
8	1	Joanne Cuddihy	Ireland	51.46	
