= Fancy Cherotich =

Kenyan steeplechase runner

Personal information
- Nationality: Kenyan
- Born: August 10, 1990 (age 35)
- Home town: Southern Rift Valley, Kenya

Sport
- Sport: Athletics
- Event: 3000 metres steeplechase

Achievements and titles
- Personal bests: 3000m SC: 9:28.04 (2013); 1500m: 4:15.84 (2013); 400mH: 1:06.31 (2009)
Medal record
Women's athletics
Representing Kenya
African Junior Championships
Gold medal – first place	2009 Bambous	4 × 400 m
Bronze medal – third place	2009 Bambous	400 m hurdles
Bronze medal – third place	2009 Bambous	1500 m

Fancy Cherotich (born 10 August 1990) is a Kenyan 3000 metre steeplechase runner. At the 2009 African Junior Championships, she won medals in the 4 × 400 m, 400 m hurdles, and 1500 m. She was a regular in the 2013 and 2014 Diamond League seasons in the steeplechase.

== Biography ==
Cherotich's first international medal was at the 2009 African Junior Athletics Championships, where she won a bronze medal in the 1500 metres (and was later promoted to bronze medals in the 400 m hurdles and 4 × 400 m after the doping disqualification of Amaka Ogoegbunam).

After this, Cherotich began to focus primarily on the 3000 metre steeplechase, which she competed in during the 2013 and 2014 Diamond League seasons. Her best placing at a Diamond League meeting was 3rd at the 2013 Monaco Herculis meeting, finishing in a time of 9:36.82.

She ran her personal best time of 9:28.04 at the 2013 Ostrava Golden Spike meet, finishing in 5th place.

== Statistics ==
=== Personal bests ===
Event	Mark	Competition	Venue	Date
3000 metres steeplechase	9:28.04	Ostrava Golden Spike	Ostrava, Czech Republic	27 June 2013
