= 2006 IAAF World Indoor Championships – Women's 400 metres =

The Women's 400 metres event at the 2006 IAAF World Indoor Championships was held on March 10–12.

== Medalists ==
Gold	Silver	Bronze
Olesya Forsheva; Russia	Vania Stambolova; Bulgaria	Christine Amertil; Bahamas

== Results ==
=== Heats ===
First 2 of each heat (Q) and the next 4 fastest (q) qualified for the semifinals.

Rank	Heat	Name	Nationality	Time	Notes
1	1	Vania Stambolova	Bulgaria	51.04	Q
2	3	Olesya Forsheva	Russia	51.18	Q
3	1	Novlene Williams	Jamaica	51.57	Q, PB
4	1	Ilona Usovich	Belarus	51.71	q, PB
5	2	Natalya Nazarova	Russia	51.77	Q
6	2	Mariyana Dimitrova	Bulgaria	52.07	Q
7	4	Sanya Richards	United States	52.25	Q
8	4	Christine Amertil	Bahamas	52.33	Q
9	2	Monika Bejnar	Poland	52.36	q, NR
10	1	Angela Moroșanu	Romania	52.49	q
11	4	Grażyna Prokopek	Poland	52.89	q, SB
12	2	Danijela Grgić	Croatia	52.91	PB
13	3	Claudia Hoffmann	Germany	53.05	Q
14	3	Mary Wineberg	United States	53.07	
15	3	Ronetta Smith	Jamaica	53.57	
16	4	Aliann Pompey	Guyana	53.72	
17	3	Sandrine Thiébaud-Kangni	Togo	53.83	SB
18	2	Klodiana Shala	Albania	54.21	
	1	Alissa Kallinikou	Cyprus	DNS	

=== Semifinals ===
First 3 of each semifinal qualified directly (Q) for the final.

Rank	Heat	Name	Nationality	Time	Notes
1	2	Olesya Forsheva	Russia	50.61	Q
2	1	Vania Stambolova	Bulgaria	50.66	Q
3	1	Natalya Nazarova	Russia	50.67	Q
4	2	Christine Amertil	Bahamas	51.09	Q, PB
5	1	Novlene Williams	Jamaica	51.25	Q, PB
6	1	Ilona Usovich	Belarus	51.53	PB
7	2	Mariyana Dimitrova	Bulgaria	52.17	Q
8	1	Claudia Hoffmann	Germany	52.32	
9	2	Sanya Richards	United States	52.46	
10	2	Angela Moroșanu	Romania	52.57	
11	2	Monika Bejnar	Poland	52.60	
12	1	Grażyna Prokopek	Poland	53.64	

=== Final ===
Rank	Name	Nationality	Time	Notes
1st place, gold medalist(s)	Olesya Forsheva	Russia	50.04	CR
2nd place, silver medalist(s)	Vania Stambolova	Bulgaria	50.21	NR
3rd place, bronze medalist(s)	Christine Amertil	Bahamas	50.34	AR
4	Natalya Nazarova	Russia	50.60	
5	Novlene Williams	Jamaica	51.82	
6	Mariyana Dimitrova	Bulgaria	52.66	
