= Raasin McIntosh =

Liberian-American hurdler

Personal information
- Born: April 29, 1982 (age 44) Texas, United States
- Height: 1.70 m (5 ft 7 in)
- Weight: 59 kg (130 lb)

Sport
- Sport: Athletics
- Event: 400m Hurdles
Medal record
Women's athletics
Representing Liberia
African Championships
Bronze medal – third place	2012 Porto-Novo	400 m hurdles

Raasin McIntosh (born 29 April 1982) is an American Olympic hurdler and philanthropist. At the 2012 Summer Olympics, she competed in the Women's 400 metres hurdles representing Liberia.

== Life ==
She grew up in Houston and went on to attend the University of Texas on an athlete scholarship. She trained under a prominent track coach, Bev Kearney, and went on to represent the United States at the 2003 World Championships in Athletics. She was the winner of the 400 m hurdles at the 2003 USA Outdoor Track and Field Championships and was in the top three of both the 400 m and 100-meter hurdles at the NCAA Women's Outdoor Track and Field Championship that year.

She is CEO and Creative Director of Raasin in the Sun, a 501 c3 Non profit cultivating resilient communities through art and environmental initiatives.
