= 2010 African Championships in Athletics – Women's heptathlon =

The women's heptathlon at the 2010 African Championships in Athletics was held on July 30–31.

== Medalists ==
Gold	Silver	Bronze
Margaret Simpson; Ghana	Janet Wienand; South Africa	Ts'oalei Selloane; Lesotho

== Results ==
=== 100 metres hurdles ===
Rank	Heat	Name	Nationality	Time	Points	Notes
1	2	Margaret Simpson	Ghana	13.93	988	
2	2	Janet Wienand	South Africa	14.05	971	PB
3	1	Patience Okoro	Nigeria	14.65	888	PB
4	1	Ts'oalei Selloane	Lesotho	14.89	856	SB
5	2	Sandrine Kangni Thiebaud	Togo	15.06	834	PB
6	1	Nana Blakime	Togo	15.53	773	PB
7	1	Corlia Kruger	Namibia	15.95	720	
8	2	Bibiana Olama	Equatorial Guinea	15.95	720	NR
9	2	Catherine Kagwiria	Kenya	16.95	602	
10	1	Nicole Offner	South Africa	16.99	598	
11	2	Margaret Mumbi	Kenya	19.30	363	
12	1	Lydiah Tum Chepkirui	Kenya	20.76	242	
	1	Bonolo Maretele	Botswana	DNS	0	
	2	Beatrice Kambole	Burkina Faso	DNS	0	

=== High jump ===
Rank	Athlete	Nationality	1.30	1.33	1.36	1.39	1.42	1.45	1.48	1.51	1.54	1.57	1.60	1.63	1.66	1.69	1.72	1.75	1.78	1.81	Result	Points	Notes	Overall
1	Margaret Simpson	Ghana	–	–	–	–	–	–	–	–	–	–	o	o	–	o	o	o	o	xxx	1.78	953		1941
2	Ts'oalei Selloane	Lesotho	–	–	–	–	–	–	–	–	–	–	o	o	o	o	o	xo	xxx		1.75	916		1772
3	Patience Okoro	Nigeria	–	–	–	–	–	–	–	o	–	o	o	o	xo	o	xxx				1.69	842	SB	1730
4	Janet Wienand	South Africa	–	–	–	–	–	–	–	–	–	xo	–	xo	o	xo	xxx				1.69	842	PB	1813
5	Corlia Kruger	Namibia	–	–	–	–	–	–	–	o	o	o	o	xxx							1.60	736		1456
6	Sandrine Kangni Thiebaud	Togo	–	–	–	–	o	o	o	xo	o	xxo	xxx								1.57	701	PB	1535
7	Catherine Kagwiria	Kenya	–	–	–	–	–	o	o	xo	xxx										1.51	632		1234
8	Nicole Offner	South Africa	–	–	–	–	o	o	o	xxx											1.48	599		1197
8	Bibiana Olama	Equatorial Guinea	–	–	–	–	–	–	o	xxx											1.48	599	=NR	1319
10	Margaret Mumbi	Kenya	–	–	–	–	o	xxx													1.42	534		897
11	Lydiah Tum Chepkirui	Kenya	–	o	o	o	xxx														1.39	502		744
12	Nana Blakime	Togo	o	xo	o	–	xxx														1.36	470	SB	1243

=== Shot put ===
Rank	Athlete	Nationality	#1	#2	#3	Result	Points	Notes	Overall
1	Patience Okoro	Nigeria	13.09	13.08	X	13.09	733	PB	2463
2	Margaret Simpson	Ghana	12.10	11.91	X	12.10	668		2609
3	Nicole Offner	South Africa	11.54	11.71	X	11.71	642		1839
4	Janet Wienand	South Africa	11.44	X	11.11	11.44	624	PB	2437
5	Ts'oalei Selloane	Lesotho	X	11.12	10.64	11.12	603		2375
6	Bibiana Olama	Equatorial Guinea	10.75	10.36	10.59	10.75	579		1898
7	Sandrine Kangni Thiebaud	Togo	10.55	10.39	10.52	10.55	566	SB	2101
8	Nana Blakime	Togo	10.14	9.56	10.13	10.14	539	SB	1782
9	Corlia Kruger	Namibia	8.86	8.66	X	8.86	455		1911
10	Catherine Kagwiria	Kenya	7.03	8.39	8.05	8.39	425		1659
11	Margaret Mumbi	Kenya	7.03	7.64	7.77	7.77	385		1282
12	Lydiah Tum Chepkirui	Kenya	6.83	X	6.59	6.83	385		1129

=== 200 metres ===
Rank	Heat	Name	Nationality	Time	Points	Notes	Overall
1	2	Margaret Simpson	Ghana	24.99	888	SB	3497
2	2	Janet Wienand	South Africa	25.38	852	PB	3289
3	2	Sandrine Kangni Thiebaud	Togo	25.49	842	SB	2943
4	1	Patience Okoro	Nigeria	25.81	814	PB	3277
5	1	Ts'oalei Selloane	Lesotho	26.24	776	SB	3151
6	1	Nana Blakime	Togo	26.67	740	SB	2522
7	2	Margaret Mumbi	Kenya	26.73	734		2016
8	2	Catherine Kagwiria	Kenya	26.81	728		2387
9	1	Corlia Kruger	Namibia	26.95	716		2627
10	1	Nicole Offner	South Africa	27.22	694		2533
11	1	Lydiah Tum Chepkirui	Kenya	27.42	677		1806
12	2	Bibiana Olama	Equatorial Guinea	27.82	645		2543

=== Long jump ===
Rank	Athlete	Nationality	#1	#2	#3	Result	Points	Notes	Overall
1	Margaret Simpson	Ghana	6.12	6.06	6.00	6.12	887		4384
2	Ts'oalei Selloane	Lesotho	5.76	5.84	X	5.84	801		3952
3	Janet Wienand	South Africa	5.57	5.75	5.83	5.83	798	PB	4087
4	Nana Blakime	Togo	5.82	5.67	5.57	5.82	795	=PB	3317
5	Sandrine Kangni Thiebaud	Togo	5.70	X	5.54	5.70	759	PB	3702
6	Patience Okoro	Nigeria	X	5.51	5.58	5.58	723		4000
7	Corlia Kruger	Namibia	5.21	5.32	5.21	5.32	648		3275
8	Margaret Mumbi	Kenya	4.68	5.25	5.10	5.25	628		2644
9	Catherine Kagwiria	Kenya	4.82	5.18	4.93	5.18	609		2996
10	Lydiah Tum Chepkirui	Kenya	X	5.13	4.77	5.13	595		2401
11	Nicole Offner	South Africa	5.02	5.12	X	5.12	592		3125
12	Bibiana Olama	Equatorial Guinea	4.33	4.51	4.54	4.54	438		2981

=== Javelin throw ===
Rank	Athlete	Nationality	#1	#2	#3	Result	Points	Notes	Overall
1	Margaret Simpson	Ghana	48.48	52.18	50.08	52.18	902	SB	5286
2	Patience Okoro	Nigeria	X	X	41.32	41.32	693	PB	4693
3	Nicole Offner	South Africa	34.34	38.17	38.67	38.67	642		3767
4	Janet Wienand	South Africa	38.12	37.82	36.38	38.12	631	PB	4718
5	Ts'oalei Selloane	Lesotho	33.31	34.88	34.16	34.88	569	SB	4521
6	Margaret Mumbi	Kenya	X	31.45	30.32	31.45	504		3148
7	Bibiana Olama	Equatorial Guinea	30.54	31.12	28.88	31.12	498		3479
8	Sandrine Kangni Thiebaud	Togo	X	25.99	28.87	28.87	455	PB	4157
9	Lydiah Tum Chepkirui	Kenya	28.52	X	23.11	28.52	449		2850
10	Corlia Kruger	Namibia	24.12	27.35	28.24	28.24	443		3718
11	Nana Blakime	Togo	25.33	X	X	25.33	389	SB	3706
12	Catherine Kagwiria	Kenya	21.00	15.52	19.32	21.00	307		3303

=== 800 metres ===
Rank	Heat	Name	Nationality	Time	Points	Notes
1	1	Lydiah Tum Chepkirui	Kenya	2:15.40	887	
2	1	Catherine Kagwiria	Kenya	2:20.79	813	
3	2	Janet Wienand	South Africa	2:23.12	782	PB
4	2	Ts'oalei Selloane	Lesotho	2:23.15	781	
5	2	Sandrine Kangni Thiebaud	Togo	2:24.03	770	
6	2	Margaret Simpson	Ghana	2:25.88	745	
7	1	Margaret Mumbi	Kenya	2:32.19	666	
8	2	Corlia Kruger	Namibia	2:32.72	659	
9	1	Bibiana Olama	Equatorial Guinea	2:34.75	635	
10	1	Nicole Offner	South Africa	2:40.02	573	
11	1	Nana Blakime	Togo	2:45.21	515	SB
12	2	Patience Okoro	Nigeria	2:51.04	453	SB

=== Final results ===
The highest mark recorded in each event is highlighted in yellow

Rank	Athlete	Nationality	100m H	HJ	SP	200m	LJ	JT	800m	Points	Notes
1st place, gold medalist(s)	Margaret Simpson	Ghana	13.93	1.78	12.10	24.99	6.12	52.18	2:25.88	6031	CR
2nd place, silver medalist(s)	Janet Wienand	South Africa	14.05	1.69	11.44	25.38	5.83	38.12	2:23.12	5500	
3rd place, bronze medalist(s)	Ts'oalei Selloane	Lesotho	14.89	1.75	11.12	26.24	5.84	34.88	2:23.15	5302	
4	Patience Okoro	Nigeria	14.65	1.69	13.09	25.81	5.58	41.32	2:51.04	5146	SB
5	Sandrine Kangni Thiebaud	Togo	15.06	1.57	10.55	25.49	5.70	28.87	2:24.03	4927	
6	Corlia Kruger	Namibia	15.95	1.60	8.86	26.95	5.32	28.24	2:32.72	4377	NR
7	Nicole Offner	South Africa	16.99	1.48	11.71	27.22	5.12	38.67	2:40.02	4340	
8	Nana Blakime	Togo	15.53	1.36	10.14	26.67	5.82	25.33	2:45.21	4221	SB
9	Catherine Kagwiria	Kenya	16.95	1.51	8.39	26.81	5.18	21.00	2:20.79	4116	SB
10	Bibiana Olama	Equatorial Guinea	15.95	1.48	10.75	27.82	4.54	31.12	2:34.75	4114	NR
11	Margaret Mumbi	Kenya	19.30	1.42	7.94	26.73	5.25	31.45	2:32.19	3824	SB
12	Lydiah Tum Chepkirui	Kenya	20.76	1.39	6.83	27.42	5.13	28.52	2:15.40	3676	SB
	Beatrice Kambole	Burkina Faso	DNS	–	–	–	–	–	–	DNS	
	Bonolo Maretele	Botswana	DNS	–	–	–	–	–	–	DNS	
