= Athletics at the 2009 Summer Universiade – Women's 400 metres hurdles =

The women's 400 metres hurdles event at the 2009 Summer Universiade was held on 7–9 July.

== Medalists ==
Gold	Silver	Bronze
Vania Stambolova; Bulgaria	Jonna Tilgner; Germany	Sara Slott Petersen; Denmark

== Results ==
=== Heats ===
Qualification: First 2 of each heat (Q) and the next 2 fastest (q) qualified for the final.

Rank	Heat	Name	Nationality	Time	Notes
1	2	Vania Stambolova	Bulgaria	56.20	Q
2	3	Jonna Tilgner	Germany	56.41	Q, SB
3	2	Christina Kron	Germany	56.76	Q, SB
3	3	Lauren Boden	Australia	56.76	Q
5	3	Houria Moussa	Algeria	57.05	q
6	1	Sara Slott Petersen	Denmark	57.28	Q
7	1	Mame Fatou Faye	Senegal	57.46	Q, PB
8	1	Brona Furlong	Ireland	57.87	q, PB
9	3	Wenda Theron	South Africa	57.89	
10	2	Deng Xiaoqing	China	58.05	
11	1	Laura Sotomayor	Spain	58.94	
12	2	Janet Wienand	South Africa	59.19	
13	2	Sara Orešnik	Slovenia	1:00.13	
14	1	Mila Andrić	Serbia	1:00.16	
15	3	Gorana Cvijetić	Bosnia and Herzegovina	1:01.34	
16	2	Olga Balatskaya	Russia	1:02.72	
	3	Amaka Ogoebunam	Nigeria	DNS	

=== Final ===
Rank	Lane	Name	Nationality	Time	Notes
1st place, gold medalist(s)	3	Vania Stambolova	Bulgaria	55.14	
2nd place, silver medalist(s)	4	Jonna Tilgner	Germany	56.02	SB
3rd place, bronze medalist(s)	5	Sara Slott Petersen	Denmark	56.40	SB
4	6	Christina Kron	Germany	56.72	SB
5	7	Lauren Boden	Australia	56.81	
6	1	Houria Moussa	Algeria	58.02	
7	2	Brona Furlong	Ireland	58.40	
8	8	Mame Fatou Faye	Senegal	58.73	
