= Glory Onome Nathaniel =

Nigerian hurdler

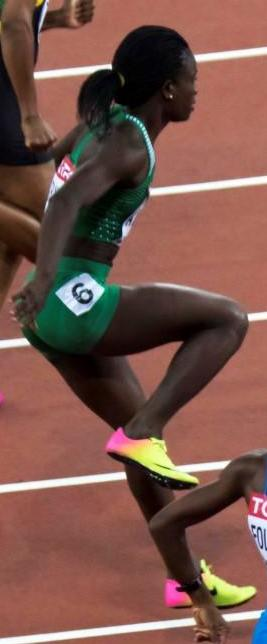

Personal information
- Born: 23 January 1996 (age 30) Enwhe, Isoko South, Nigeria
- Education: Tai Solarin University of Education
- Weight: 62 kg (137 lb)

Sport
- Sport: Athletics
- Event: 400 m hurdles
- Club: Buka Tigers Athletics Club
- Coached by: Oluwaseun Jayesinmi

Glory Onome Nathaniel (born 23 January 1996) is a Nigerian athlete specialising in the 400 metres hurdles. She represented her country at the 2017 World Championships reaching the semifinals. Additionally, she won three silver medals at the 2017 Islamic Solidarity Games.

Onome studied Human Kinetics Department at Tai Solarin University of Education (TASUED). She got enlisted on the Institution Hall of Fame when she made the Top 21 list of Students That Shaped TASUED In 2016/17.

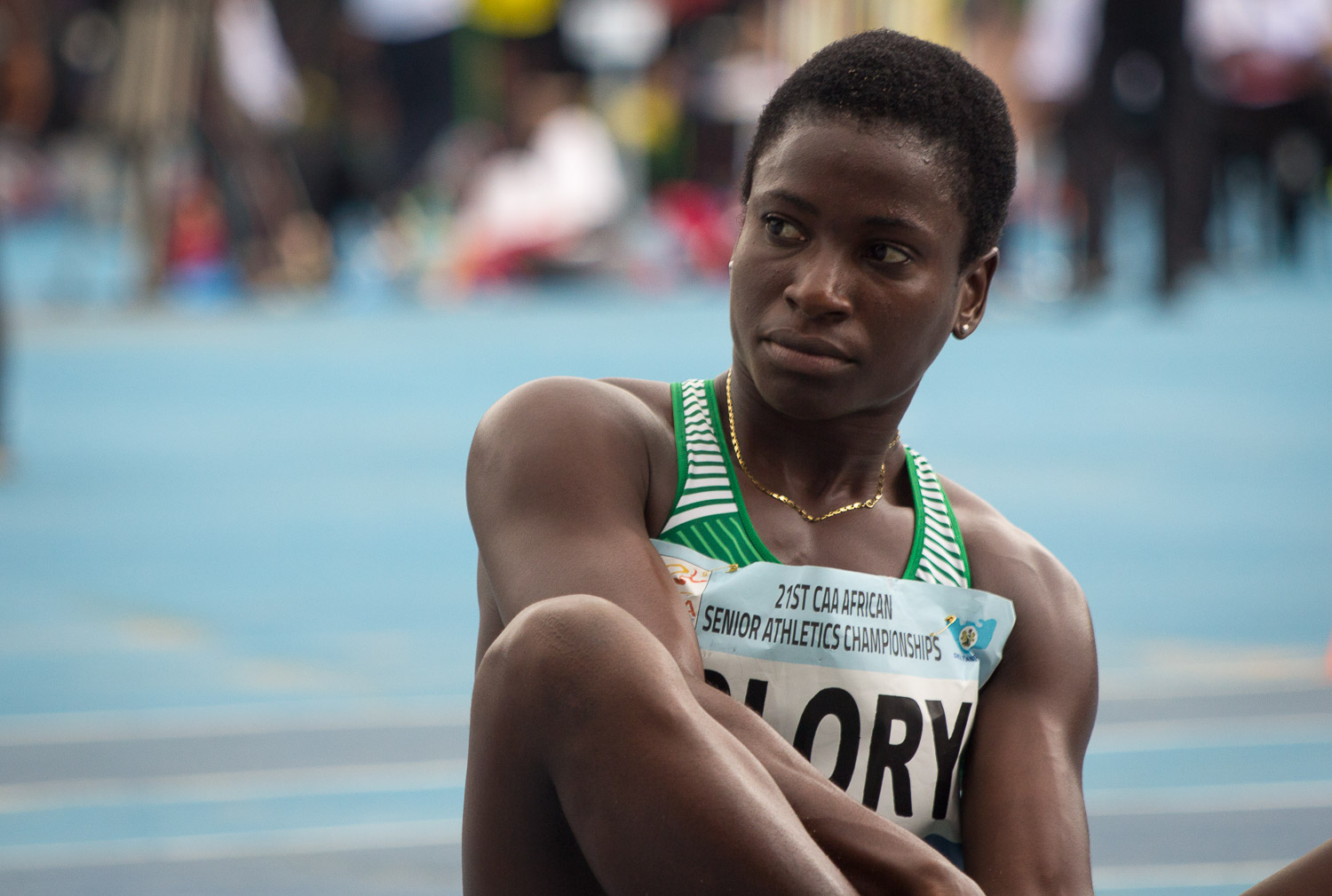
Glory Nathaniel Onome of Nigeria at the 2018 African Athletics Championship in Asaba, Nigeria

Her personal bests are 55.30 seconds in the 400 metres hurdles (London 2017) and 52.24 seconds in the 400 metres (Abuja 2017).

Nathaniel served a four-year ban from 2018 to 2022 for an anti-doping rule violation after testing positive for stanozolol.

== International competitions ==
Year	Competition	Venue	Position	Event	Notes
Representing Nigeria
2013	African Youth Championships	Warri, Nigeria	1st	400 m hurdles	62.04
2013	World Youth Championships	Donetsk, Ukraine	34th (h)	400 m hurdles	67.06
2015	African Junior Championships	Addis Ababa, Ethiopia	3rd	400 m hurdles	60.51
2017	Islamic Solidarity Games	Baku, Azerbaijan	2nd	400 m hurdles	55.90
2017	Islamic Solidarity Games	Baku, Azerbaijan	2nd	4 × 100 m relay	46.20
2017	Islamic Solidarity Games	Baku, Azerbaijan	2nd	4 × 400 m relay	3:34.47
2017	World Championships	London, United Kingdom	9th (h)	400 m hurdles	55.30^{1}
2017	World Championships	London, United Kingdom	5th	4 × 400 m relay	3:26.72
2018	Commonwealth Games	Gold Coast, Australia	6th	400 m hurdles	56.39
2018	Commonwealth Games	Gold Coast, Australia	2nd	4 × 400 m relay	3:25.29
2018	African Championships	Asaba, Nigeria	DQ^{2}	400 m hurdles	~~55.53~~

^{1}Disqualified in the semifinals
^{2}Finished in first place, but later disqualified for doping
