= Francisca Koki Manunga =

Kenyan hurdler (born 1993)

Personal information
- Born: 30 October 1993 (age 32)

Sport
- Country: Kenya
- Sport: Track and field
Medal record
Women's athletics
Representing Kenya
African Championships
Silver medal – second place	2014 Marrakesh	4×400 m
Bronze medal – third place	2014 Marrakesh	400 m hurdles
- Updated on 27 August 2016

Francisca Koki Manunga (born 30 October 1993) is a Kenyan hurdler. She competed in the Women's 400 metres hurdles event at the 2015 World Championships in Athletics in Beijing, China. She was disqualified after failing a doping test.
