= Vania Stambolova =

Bulgarian sprinter and hurdler

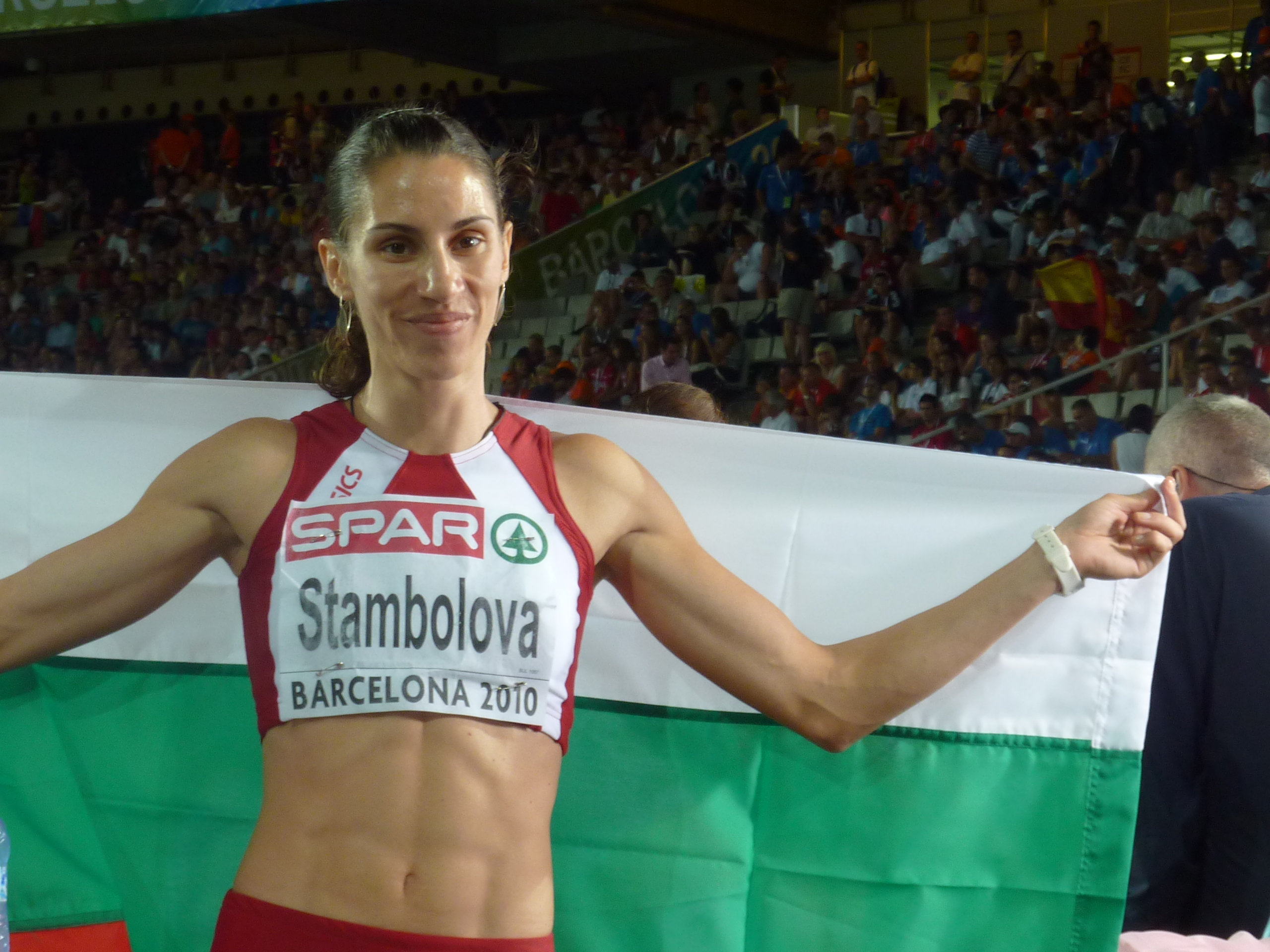
- Vania Stambolova celebrating her silver medal in Barcelona, 2010

Personal information
- Full name: Vania Stambolova
- Born: 28 November 1983 (age 42) Varna, People's Republic of Bulgaria
- Height: 1.74 m (5 ft 8 1/2 in)
- Weight: 55 kg (121 lb)

Achievements and titles
- Personal bests: 200 metres – 22.81 (2006); 400 metres – 49.53 (2006); 400 metres hurdles – 53.68 (2011)
Medal record
Event	1st	2nd	3rd
World Indoor Championships	0	2	0
European Championships	1	1	0
Summer Universiade	1	0	0
Continental Cup	0	0	1
Total	2	2	2
World Indoor Championships
Silver medal – second place	2006 Moscow	400 m
Silver medal – second place	2010 Doha	400 m
European Championships
Gold medal – first place	2006 Gothenburg	400 m
Silver medal – second place	2010 Barcelona	400 m hurdles
Summer Universiade
Gold medal – first place	2009 Belgrade	400 m hurdles
Continental Cup
Bronze medal – third place	2010 Split	400 m hurdles
- Updated on 21 March 2012

Vania Stambolova (Bulgarian: Ваня Стамболова) (born 28 November 1983) is a Bulgarian athlete. She competes in the 400 m hurdles and the 400 m event. At the 2006 IAAF World Indoor Championships she won a silver medal over 400 m. She also won a gold medal at the 2006 European Championships, and she was subsequently named the 2006 BTA Best Balkan Athlete of the Year. At present, Stambolova is the highest paid female athlete in Bulgaria.

During the London 2012 Olympics, Stambolova tripped while competing in the 400 m hurdles event and failed to finish.

At the 2014 European Championships, she finished in 6th place in the 800 m, setting a personal best in the final.

Stambolova tested positive for testosterone in January 2007, and was subsequently suspended for two years by the IAAF.

According to World Athletics, Stambolova has not competed since 2019.

== Achievements ==
Year	Competition	Venue	Position	Event	Notes
Representing Bulgaria
2005	World Championships	Helsinki, Finland	28th (h)	400 m hurdles	58.99
2006	World Indoor Championships	Moscow, Russia	2nd	400 m	50.21
2006	European Championships	Gothenburg, Sweden	1st	400 m	49.85
2009	Universiade	Belgrade, Serbia	1st	400 m hurdles	55.14
2009	World Championships	Berlin, Germany	15th (sf)	400 m hurdles	56.12
2010	World Indoor Championships	Doha, Qatar	2nd	400 m	51.50
2010	European Championships	Barcelona, Spain	2nd	400 m hurdles	53.82
2010	Continental Cup	Split, Croatia	3rd	400 m hurdles	54.89
2011	European Indoor Championships	Paris, France	4th	400 m	52.58
2011	World Championships	Daegu, South Korea	6th	400 m hurdles	54.23
2012	World Indoor Championships	Istanbul, Turkey	4th	400 m	51.99
2014	European Championships	Zürich, Switzerland	6th	800 m	2:00.91

== Personal bests ==
Outdoor:

- 200 metres: 22.81 (Sofia 2006)
- 400 metres: 49.53 (Rieti 2006)
- 400 metres hurdles: 53.68 (Rabat 2011)

Indoor:

- 200 metres : 23.51 (Sofia 2006)
- 400 metres : 50.21 (Moscow 2006)
- 800 metres : 2:02.03 (Vienna 2012)

== See also ==
- List of sportspeople sanctioned for doping offences
