= Danijela Grgić =

Croatian sprinter (born 1988)

Danijela Grgić (born 28 September 1988 in Banja Luka) is a Croatian athlete competing mainly in the 400 metres. She is the national record holder over that distance. She won the silver medal at the 2007 Summer Universiade in Bangkok.

== Competition record ==
Year	Competition	Venue	Position	Event	Notes
Representing Croatia
2003	World Youth Championships	Sherbrooke, Canada	9th (sf)	200 m	24.28
2004	World Junior Championships	Grosseto, Italy	12th (sf)	200 m	24.19 (wind: +0.7 m/s)
2005	European Indoor Championships	Madrid, Spain	–	400 m	DQ
2005	World Youth Championships	Marrakesh, Morocco	2nd	400 m	51.30
2005	European Junior Championships	Kaunas, Lithuania	1st	400 m	52.42
2006	World Indoor Championships	Moscow, Russia	12th (h)	400 m	52.91
2006	World Junior Championships	Beijing, China	1st	400 m	50.78
2006	European Championships	Gothenburg, Sweden	9th (sf)	400 m	52.00
2007	European Indoor Championships	Birmingham, United Kingdom	14th (h)	400 m	53.35
2007	European Junior Championships	Hengelo, Netherlands	1st	400 m	52.45
2007	Universiade	Bangkok, Thailand	2nd	400 m	53.35
2009	Mediterranean Games	Pescara, Italy	8th (h)	400 m	54.67

== Personal bests ==
Outdoor

- 200 metres – 23.69 (+0.4 m/s) (Varaždin 2006)
- 400 metres – 50.78 (Beijing 2006) NR

Indoor

- 200 metres – 24.15 (Budapest 2006)
- 400 metres – 52.91 (Moscow 2006)
