= 2010 African Championships in Athletics – Women's 400 metres hurdles =

The women's 400 metres hurdles at the 2010 African Championships in Athletics were held on July 31–August 1.

== Medalists ==
Gold	Silver	Bronze
Hayat Lambarki; Morocco	Ajoke Odumosu; Nigeria	Maureen Jelagat Maiyo; Kenya

== Results ==
=== Heats ===
Qualification: First 3 of each heat (Q) and the next 2 fastest (q) qualified for the final.

Rank	Heat	Name	Nationality	Time	Notes
1	2	Ajoke Odumosu	Nigeria	55.86	Q
2	1	Hayat Lambarki	Morocco	56.86	Q
3	2	Maureen Jelagat Maiyo	Kenya	57.02	Q, SB
4	2	Kou Luogon	Liberia	57.82	Q
5	1	Olga Razanamalala	Madagascar	57.83	Q
6	2	Wenda Theron	South Africa	57.84	q
7	2	Carole Made Kaboud Mebam	Cameroon	57.89	q
8	1	Aïssata Soulama	Burkina Faso	57.96	Q
9	1	Florence Wasike	Kenya	58.35	
10	1	Bimbo Miel Ayedou	Benin	58.44	NR
11	1	Tabitha Mwihaki	Kenya	59.93	SB
12	2	Wesene Belay	Ethiopia	1:01.00	
13	1	Lemelem Berha	Ethiopia	1:03.74	
14	2	Grace Gimo	Zimbabwe	1:20.67	

=== Final ===
Rank	Lane	Name	Nationality	Time	Notes
1st place, gold medalist(s)	4	Hayat Lambarki	Morocco	55.96	PB
2nd place, silver medalist(s)	3	Ajoke Odumosu	Nigeria	55.97	
3rd place, bronze medalist(s)	5	Maureen Jelagat Maiyo	Kenya	56.74	SB
4	7	Kou Luogon	Liberia	57.17	
5	8	Aïssata Soulama	Burkina Faso	57.19	
6	6	Olga Razanamalala	Madagascar	57.51	
7	1	Wenda Theron	South Africa	57.70	
8	2	Carole Made Kaboud Mebam	Cameroon	58.05	
