= Athletics at the 2007 All-Africa Games – Women's 400 metres hurdles =

The women's 400 metres hurdles at the 2007 All-Africa Games were held on July 19–22.

== Medalists ==
Gold	Silver	Bronze
Muna Jabir Adam; Sudan	Aïssata Soulama; Burkina Faso	Joke Odumosu; Nigeria

== Results ==
=== Heats ===
Qualification: First 3 of each heat (Q) and the next 2 fastest (q) qualified for the final.

Rank	Heat	Name	Nationality	Time	Notes
1	2	Muna Jabir Adam	Sudan	56.65	Q
2	1	Janet Wienand	South Africa	57.24	Q
3	2	Aïssata Soulama	Burkina Faso	57.32	Q
4	2	Florence Wasike	Kenya	57.62	Q
5	1	Joke Odumosu	Nigeria	57.90	Q
6	2	Houria Moussa	Algeria	58.58	q
7	1	Gladys Stephens	Nigeria	58.59	Q
8	1	Caren Nyakawa	Kenya	58.80	q
9	2	Mame Fatou Faye	Senegal	58.97	
10	2	Mary Onyfumika	Nigeria	59.03	
11	1	Tamla Denise Pietersen	Zimbabwe	1:03.74	

=== Final ===
Rank	Name	Nationality	Time	Notes
1st place, gold medalist(s)	Muna Jabir Adam	Sudan	54.93	NR
2nd place, silver medalist(s)	Aïssata Soulama	Burkina Faso	55.49	NR
3rd place, bronze medalist(s)	Joke Odumosu	Nigeria	55.80	
4	Houria Moussa	Algeria	57.35	
5	Florence Wasike	Kenya	57.37	
6	Caren Nyakawa	Kenya	58.26	
7	Gladys Stephens	Nigeria	58.98	
8	Janet Wienand	South Africa	1:01.14	
