= Wenda Nel =

South African hurdler

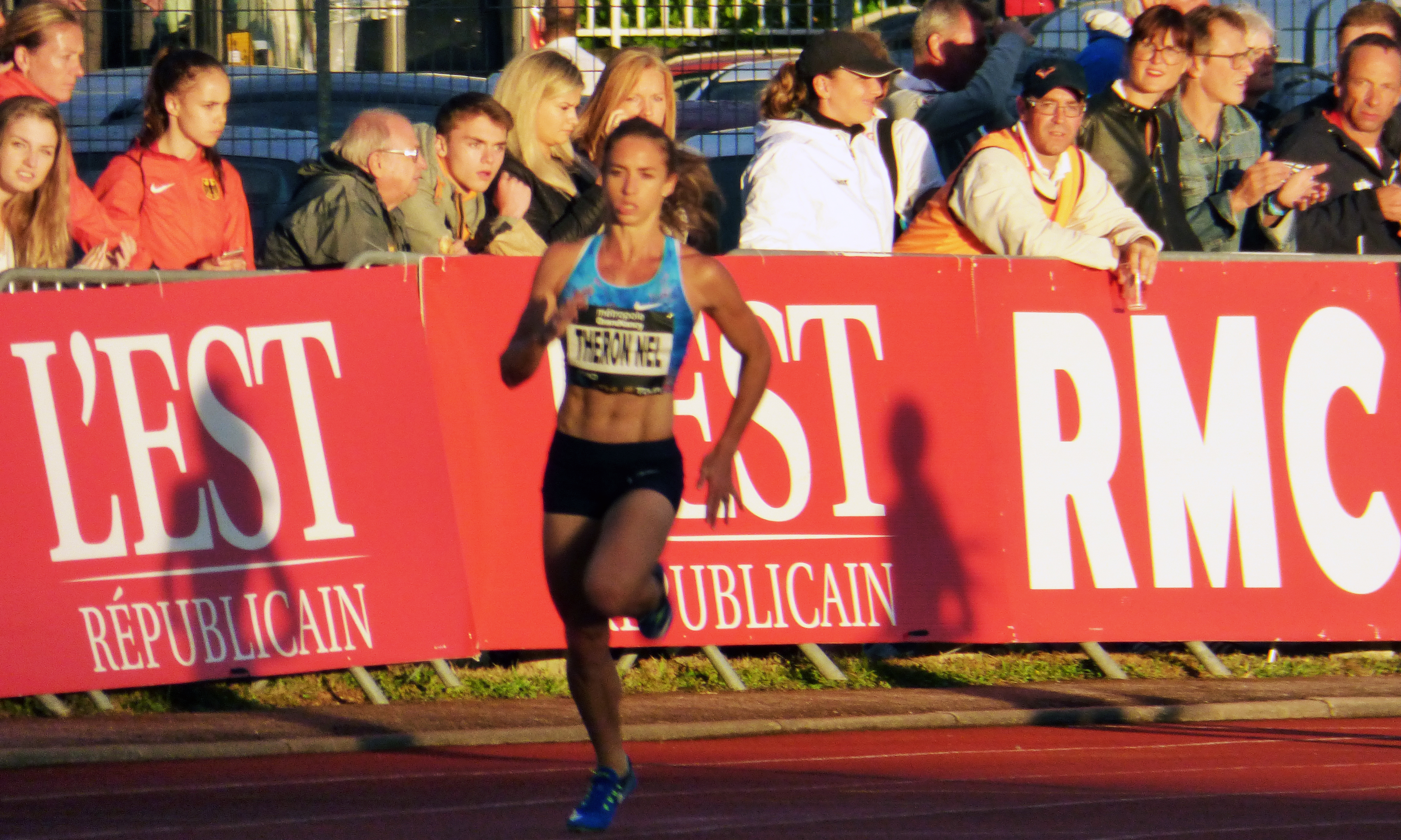
- Nel in 2017

Personal information
- Born: 30 July 1988 (age 37) Worcester, Western Cape, South Africa
- Education: University of Pretoria
- Height: 1.65 m (5 ft 5 in)
- Weight: 57 kg (126 lb)

Sport
- Country: South Africa
- Sport: Athletics
- Event: 400 metres hurdles
- Coached by: Irma Reyneke
Medal record
Women's athletics
Representing South Africa
All-Africa Games
| Silver medal – second place | 2011 Maputo | 400 m hurdles |
African Championships
| Gold medal – first place | 2014 Marrakesh | 400 m hurdles |
| Gold medal – first place | 2016 Durban | 400 m hurdles |
| Gold medal – first place | 2016 Durban | 4×400 m |
| Silver medal – second place | 2018 Asaba | 400 m hurdles |
Commonwealth Games
| Bronze medal – third place | 2018 Gold Coast | 400 m hurdles |

Wenda Nel (née Theron; born 30 July 1988) is a South African athlete specialising in the 400 metres hurdles. She competed at the 2011 World Championships reaching the semifinals.

She competed in the women's 400 metres hurdles at the 2020 Summer Olympics.

Her personal best in the event is 54.37 from 20 May 2015.

== Competition record ==
| Year | Competition | Venue | Position | Event | Notes |
Representing South Africa
| 2005 | World Youth Championships | Marrakesh, Morocco | 17th (h) | 200 m | 24.33 |
| 2006 | World Junior Championships | Beijing, China | 45th (h) | 100m | 12.12 (+0.6 m/s) |
| 2006 | World Junior Championships | Beijing, China | 35th (h) | 200m | 24.74 (-0.7 m/s) |
| 2006 | World Junior Championships | Beijing, China | 17th (h) | 4 × 100 m relay | 46.90 |
| 2007 | African Junior Championships | Ouagadougou, Burkina Faso | 8th | 100 m hurdles | 15.73 |
| 2009 | Universiade | Belgrade, Serbia | 9th (h) | 400 m hurdles | 57.89 |
| 2010 | African Championships | Nairobi, Kenya | 7th | 400 m hurdles | 57.70 |
| 2011 | Universiade | Shenzhen, China | 5th | 400 m hurdles | 56.76 |
| 2011 | Universiade | Shenzhen, China | 5th | 4 × 400 m relay | 3:34.59 |
| 2011 | World Championships | Daegu, South Korea | 23rd (sf) | 400 m hurdles | 57.06 |
| 2011 | All-Africa Games | Maputo, Mozambique | 2nd | 400 m hurdles | 57.13 |
| 2012 | African Championships | Porto-Novo, Benin | 5th | 400 m hurdles | 57.06 |
| 2012 | African Championships | Porto-Novo, Benin | 4th | 4 × 400 m relay | 3:33.21 |
| 2014 | Commonwealth Games | Glasgow, United Kingdom | 5th (h) | 400 m hurdles | 56.38 |
| 2014 | African Championships | Marrakesh, Morocco | 1st | 400 m hurdles | 55.32 |
| 2015 | World Championships | Beijing, China | 7th | 400 m hurdles | 54.94 |
| 2016 | African Championships | Durban, South Africa | 1st | 400 m hurdles | 54.86 |
| 2016 | African Championships | Durban, South Africa | 1st | 4 × 400 m relay | 3:28.49 (CR, NR) |
| 2016 | Olympic Games | Rio de Janeiro, Brazil | 13th (sf) | 400 m hurdles | 55.83 |
| 2017 | World Championships | London, United Kingdom | 10th (sf) | 400 m hurdles | 55.70 |
| 2017 | World Championships | London, United Kingdom | 13th (h) | 4 × 400 m relay | 3:37.82 |
| 2018 | Commonwealth Games | Gold Coast, Australia | 3rd | 400 m hurdles | 54.96 |
| 2018 | African Championships | Asaba, Nigeria | 3rd | 400 m hurdles | 57.04 |
| 2019 | African Games | Rabat, Morocco | 6th | 400 m hurdles | 58.01 |
| 2019 | African Games | Rabat, Morocco | 5th | 4 × 400 m relay | 3:41.17 |
| 2021 | Olympic Games | Tokyo, Japan | 17th (sf) | 400 m hurdles | 56.35 |
| 2022 | African Championships | Port Louis, Mauritius | 7th | 400 m hurdles | 60.43 |

=== Personal bests ===
- 400 metres 52.03 s (2017)
- 400 metres hurdles 54.37s (2015)
