= Muizat Ajoke Odumosu =

Nigerian sprinter and hurdler (born 1987)

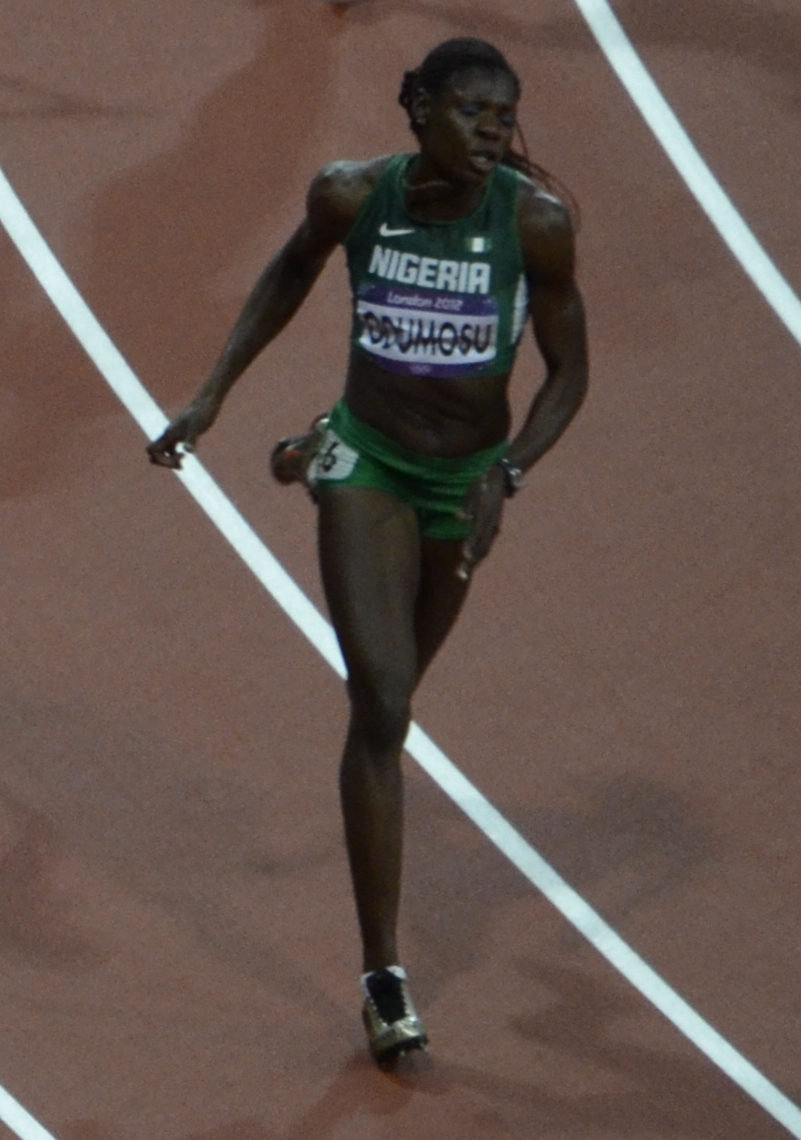
- Odumosu at the 2012 Summer Olympics

Personal information
- Born: 27 October 1987 (age 38) Lagos, Nigeria
- Height: 1.65 m (5 ft 5 in)
- Weight: 54 kg (119 lb)

Sport
- Country: Nigeria
- Sport: Athletics
- Event(s): 4 × 400m Relay, 400m Hurdles
Medal record
Women's athletics
Representing Nigeria
All-Africa Games
Gold medal – first place	2011 Maputo	400 m hurdles
Silver medal – second place	2015 Brazzaville	400 m hurdles
Bronze medal – third place	2007 Algiers	400 m hurdles
African Championships
Gold medal – first place	2008 Addis Ababa	400 m hurdles
Gold medal – first place	2010 Nairobi	4×400 m
Gold medal – first place	2012 Porto-Novo	400 m hurdles
Silver medal – second place	2010 Nairobi	400 m hurdles
Commonwealth Games
Gold medal – first place	2010 Delhi	400 m hurdles
Continental Cup
Silver medal – second place	2010 Split	400 m hurdles

Muizat Ajoke Odumosu Alademerin (born 27 October 1987) is a Nigerian track and field athlete who specialises in the 400 metres and the 400 metres hurdles. She represented Nigeria at the 2008 and 2012 Summer Olympics and competed at the World Championships in Athletics in 2007, 2009, 2011 and 2013. She was the bronze medallist at the 2007 All-Africa Games and went on to become the continental champion with a win at the 2008 and 2012 African Championships.

In 2010, she won the gold medal in the 400 metres hurdles at the Commonwealth Games, and was runner-up at the African Championships and also took a silver medal for Africa at the Continental Cup. She still holds the Nigerian record in the 400 m hurdles, after improving on her personal best to 54.40 seconds during the 2012 London Olympics semi-finals.

== Early life ==
Born in Lagos, Odumosu attended Toybat High school before moving to the United States to study at the University of South Alabama.

== Athletics career ==
=== College athletics ===
At the University of South Alabama, Odumosu represented the college's South Alabama Jaguars team, she was the 400 m Sun Belt Conference champion in 2004 but missed most of the 2004–05 season due to injury. In 2006, she became the indoor 400 m Sun Belt champion and took a sprint and hurdles double at the outdoor meeting. She reached the NCAA Championships final that year, but was disqualified due to knocking over a hurdle. She improved her personal record to 55.37 seconds to win at the Drake Relays in 2007 – a world-leading mark at that point of the season.

=== Global competition ===
Odumosu represented Nigeria internationally for the first time in August 2006, taking part in the World Junior Championships. She finished fifth in the 400 m hurdles final but managed to help the Nigerian women's 4×400 metres relay team (including Folashade Abugan, Joy Eze and Sekinat Adesanyato) the silver medal, setting a new African junior record of 3:30.84 for the event.

She began competing professionally in 2007 and won the hurdles bronze medal at the 2007 All-Africa Games in Algiers in July. At the 2007 World Championships (her first senior global championships) she ran in the 400 m hurdles, but was eliminated in the heats stage.

She reached the top of the continental rankings with a gold medal at the 2008 African Championships, taking the hurdles win in 55.92 seconds. She made her first Olympic appearance in August 2008, running the 400 metres sprint in Beijing. She set a personal best 51.39 seconds to progress through the heats, but she was eliminated in the semi-finals. She ran in the 4×400 metres relay and reached the final where the Nigerians finished in seventh placed.

At the 2009 World Championships she reached the 400 m hurdles semi-finals and was sixth overall with the women's relay team. She also set a meeting record at the Ponce Grand Prix, where she won in 55.02 seconds. Odumosu set a Nigerian record at the Herculis meeting in July 2010, running 54.68 seconds for fifth in the hurdles. She returned to defend her hurdles title at the 2010 African Championships, but she had to content herself with the silver medal behind Hayat Lambarki. She still reached the top of the podium at the competition, however, as she helped the 4×400 m relay team to a championship record of 3:29.26. Along with Lambarki, Odumosu was selected to represent the African team in the 400 m hurdles at the 2010 IAAF Continental Cup. She improved her national record to 54.59 seconds at the competition and secured the silver medal behind Jamaican Nickiesha Wilson, running for the Americas.

On 10 October 2010 Odomosu won the gold medal in the 400m hurdles at the Commonwealth Games in Delhi.
