= Olga Zaytseva =

Russian sprinter (born 1984)

Personal information
- Born: November 10, 1984 (age 41)

Sport
- Country: Russia
- Sport: Women's athletics
Medal record
European Championships
Bronze medal – third place	2006 Gothenburg	400 m
Gold medal – first place	2006 Gothenburg	4 × 400 m

Olga Igorevna Zaytseva (Russian: Ольга Игоревна Зайцева; born November 10, 1984, in Kaliningrad) is a Russian sprint athlete.

Zaytseva won the bronze medal in the 400 m at the 2006 European Athletics Championships in Gothenburg, as well as a gold medal in the 4 × 400 m relay.

She was also part of the 4 × 400 m relay team for Russia that set the world record for the indoor event in 2006.

== See also ==
- List of European Athletics Championships medalists (women)
