= 2016 African Championships in Athletics – Women's 400 metres hurdles =

The women's 400 metres hurdles event at the 2016 African Championships in Athletics was held on 25 and 26 June in Kings Park Stadium.

== Medalists ==
Gold	Silver	Bronze
Wenda Nel; South Africa	Maureen Jelagat; Kenya	Tameka Jameson; Nigeria

== Results ==
=== Heats ===
Qualification: First 3 of each heat (Q) and the next 2 fastest (q) qualified for the final.

Rank	Heat	Name	Nationality	Time	Notes
1	1	Wenda Nel	South Africa	55.33	Q
2	2	Maureen Jelagat	Kenya	57.63	Q
3	2	Tameka Jameson	Nigeria	58.17	Q
4	2	Gezelle Magerman	South Africa	58.50	Q
5	1	Aisha Naibe Wey	Sierra Leone	58.55	Q
6	2	Jean-Marie Senekal	South Africa	58.59	q
7	1	Jane Chege	Kenya	59.44	Q
8	1	Tasabih Mohamed El Said	Sudan	59.55	q
9	1	Audrey Nkamsao	Cameroon	59.70	
10	2	Safa Abdelkarim	Sudan	1:02.03	
	2	Tigist Kebede	Ethiopia	DNS	

=== Final ===
Rank	Lane	Athlete	Nationality	Time	Notes
1st place, gold medalist(s)	5	Wenda Nel	South Africa	54.86	
2nd place, silver medalist(s)	4	Maureen Jelagat	Kenya	56.12	
3rd place, bronze medalist(s)	6	Tameka Jameson	Nigeria	57.17	
4	2	Jean-Marie Senekal	South Africa	57.85	
5	8	Jane Chege	Kenya	58.60	
6	7	Gezelle Magerman	South Africa	59.08	
7	3	Aisha Naibe Wey	Sierra Leone	59.19	
8	1	Tasabih Mohamed El Said	Sudan	59.78	
