= Athletics at the 2019 African Games – Women's 400 metres hurdles =

The women's 400 metres hurdles event at the 2019 African Games was held on 29 and 30 August in Rabat.

== Medalists ==
Gold	Silver	Bronze
Vanice Nyagisera; Kenya	Lamia Lhabz; Morocco	Abasiamo Uwemedimo Akpan; Nigeria

== Results ==
=== Heats ===
Qualification: First 2 in each heat (Q) and the next 2 fastest (q) advanced to the final.

Rank	Heat	Name	Nationality	Time	Notes
1	3	Wenda Nel	South Africa	57.85	Q
2	1	Vanice Nyagisera	Kenya	57.87	Q
3	1	Zeney van der Walt	South Africa	58.15	Q
4	1	Lamia Lhabz	Morocco	58.26	q
5	2	Abasiamo Uwemedimo Akpan	Nigeria	59.01	Q
6	3	Gebeyanesh Gadecha	Ethiopia	59.05	Q
7	2	Oarabile Babolayi	Botswana	59.23	Q
8	3	Olga Razanamalala	Madagascar	59.78	q
9	1	Rita Ossai	Nigeria	1:00.36	
10	2	Fatoumata Koala	Burkina Faso	1:01.02	
11	1	Loubna Ben Hadja	Algeria	1:01.04	
12	3	Rokia Fofana	Burkina Faso	1:01.05	
13	1	Alemitu Assefa	Ethiopia	1:01.72	
14	2	Sara Hachimi	Morocco	1:02.53	
	2	Cecilia Guambe	Mozambique	DNS	
	3	Noura Ennadi	Morocco	DNS	
	3	Tasabih Mahdi	Sudan	DNS	

=== Final ===
Rank	Lane	Name	Nationality	Time	Notes
1st place, gold medalist(s)	5	Vanice Nyagisera	Kenya	56.95	
2nd place, silver medalist(s)	1	Lamia Lhabz	Morocco	56.97	
3rd place, bronze medalist(s)	4	Abasiamo Uwemedimo Akpan	Nigeria	57.66	
4	6	Zeney van der Walt	South Africa	57.67	
5	8	Oarabile Babolayi	Botswana	57.96	
6	3	Wenda Nel	South Africa	58.01	
7	2	Olga Razanamalala	Madagascar	59.74	
8	7	Gebeyanesh Gadecha	Ethiopia	59.79	
