= Tihanna Vorster =

South African sprinter (born 1985)

Medal record

Women's athletics

Representing South Africa

All-Africa Games
Silver medal – second place	2007 Algiers	4 × 400 metres relay

Tihanna Vorster (born 28 March 1985) is a retired South African sprinter who specialized in the 400 metres.

She competed in the 4 × 400 metres relay at the 2004 World Junior Championships, but the team was disqualified. The South African team fared better at the 2007 All-Africa Games where Vorster helped win the silver medal. She competed individually at the 2008 African Championships without reaching the final.

Her personal best time was 54.12 seconds, achieved in April 2003 in Durban.
