= Jennifer Rockwell =

Italian hurdler

Personal information
- Nationality: Italian
- Born: 18 May 1983 (age 43) Tooele. United States
- Height: 1.73 m (5 ft 8 in)
- Weight: 61 kg (134 lb)

Sport
- Country: Italy
- Sport: Athletics
- Event: 400 metres hurdler

Achievements and titles
- Personal best: 400 m hs: 55.51 (2010)

Jennifer Rockwell (also Rockwell-Grossarth; born 28 May 1983) is an Italian athlete specializing in 400-meter hurdles. She participated at the 2013 World Championships in Athletics.

Rockwell is from Tooele, Utah where she competed for Tooele High School. She trained under the same high school coach as Amy Christiansen Palmer. She was an All-American sprinter for the BYU Cougars track and field team, finishing runner-up on the 400 m leg of the distance medley relay at the 2003 NCAA Division I Indoor Track and Field Championships and 2004 NCAA Division I Indoor Track and Field Championships.

== Achievements ==
Year	Competition	Venue	Position	Event	Performance	Notes
2013	World Championships	(Russia) Moscow	19th Quarter	400 metres hs	56.53	
