= 2014 African Championships in Athletics – Women's 400 metres hurdles =

The women's 400 metres hurdles event at the 2014 African Championships in Athletics was held August 13–14 on Stade de Marrakech.

== Medalists ==
Gold	Silver	Bronze
Wenda Theron Nel; South Africa	Amaka Ogoegbunam; Nigeria	Francisca Koki; Kenya

== Results ==
=== Heats ===
Qualification: First 3 of each heat (Q) and the next 2 fastest (q) qualified for the final.

Rank	Heat	Name	Nationality	Time	Notes
1	2	Wenda Nel	South Africa	55.76	Q
2	2	Francisca Koki	Kenya	55.93	Q
3	1	Amaka Ogoegbunam	Nigeria	56.49	Q
4	1	Hayat Lambarki	Morocco	56.70	Q
5	1	Anneri Ebersohn	South Africa	56.84	Q
6	2	Lamiae Lhabze	Morocco	58.10	Q
7	1	Audrey Nkamsao	Cameroon	58.64	q
8	2	Hasna Grioui	Morocco	58.88	q
9	2	Mame Fatou Faye	Senegal	59.11	
10	1	Florence Wasike	Kenya	59.91	
11	2	Rashidatu Abubakar	Ghana	1:00.36	
12	2	Kemi Francis	Nigeria	1:01.42	
	1	Galilee Boumpt	Republic of the Congo	DNS	

=== Final ===
Rank	Lane	Name	Nationality	Time	Notes
1st place, gold medalist(s)	4	Wenda Nel	South Africa	55.32	
2nd place, silver medalist(s)	5	Amaka Ogoegbunam	Nigeria	55.46	
3rd place, bronze medalist(s)	6	Francisca Koki	Kenya	55.84	NR
4	3	Hayat Lambarki	Morocco	55.93	
5	7	Anneri Ebersohn	South Africa	56.71	
6	8	Lamiae Lhabze	Morocco	57.24	
7	1	Audrey Nkamsao	Cameroon	58.90	
8	2	Hasna Grioui	Morocco	1:01.79	
