= 2012 African Championships in Athletics – Women's 400 metres hurdles =

The women's 400 metres hurdles at the 2012 African Championships in Athletics was held at the Stade Charles de Gaulle on 30 June and 1 July.

== Medalists ==
Gold	Muizat Ajoke Odumosu; Nigeria
Silver	Hayat Lambarki; Morocco
Bronze	Raasin McIntosh; Liberia

== Records ==
Standing records prior to the 2012 African Championships in Athletics
World record	Yuliya Pechonkina (RUS)	52.34	Tula, Russia	8 August 2003
African record	Nezha Bidouane (MAR)	52.90	Seville, Spain	25 August 1999
Championship record	Nezha Bidouane (MAR)	54.24	Dakar, Senegal	22 August 1998

== Schedule ==
Date	Time	Round
30 June 2012	13:00	Round 1
1 July 2012	15:40	Final

== Results ==
=== Round 1 ===
First 2 in each heat (Q) and 2 best performers (q) advance to the Final.

Rank	Heat	Lane	Name	Nationality	Time	Note
1	1	6	Muizat Ajoke Odumosu	Nigeria	55.57	Q
2	1	4	Wenda Theron	South Africa	56.20	Q
3	2	5	Janet Lawless	South Africa	56.51	Q
4	2	8	Raasin McIntosh	Liberia	56.54	Q
5	3	5	Hayat Lambarki	Morocco	56.61	Q
6	1	2	Lamiae Lhabze	Morocco	57.28	q
7	2	2	Maureen Jelagat	Kenya	57.76	q
8	3	4	Kou Luogon	Liberia	57.85	Q
9	2	7	Mame Fatou Faye	Senegal	58.14	
10	1	5	Angele Cooper	Liberia	58.19	
11	2	6	Oarabile Babolayi	Botswana	58.37	
12	2	3	Nusrat Ceesay	Gambia	58.61	
13	2	4	Audrey Nkamsao	Cameroon	58.94	
14	3	6	Wesene Belay	Ethiopia	59.06	
15	3	2	Anneri Eberhsohn	South Africa	1:00.12	
16	3	8	Otu Name-Idara	Nigeria	1:02.59	
17	3	7	Safiatou Sissoko	Mali	1:07.21	
	1	7	Carole Kaboud Mebam	Cameroon	DNS	
	1	3	Yvonne Amegashie	Ghana	DNS	
	3	3	Honorine Yaméogo	Burkina Faso	DNS	

=== Final ===
Rank	Lane	Name	Nationality	Time	Note
1st place, gold medalist(s)	5	Muizat Ajoke Odumosu	Nigeria	54.99	
2nd place, silver medalist(s)	6	Hayat Lambarki	Morocco	55.41	
3rd place, bronze medalist(s)	7	Raasin McIntosh	Liberia	55.99	
4	8	Kou Luogon	Liberia	56.40	
5	4	Wenda Theron	South Africa	56.43	
6	2	Maureen Jelagat	Kenya	56.79	
7	1	Lamiae Lhabze	Morocco	57.35	
8	3	Janet Lawless	South Africa	57.56	
