= Athletics at the 2011 All-Africa Games – Women's 400 metres hurdles =

The women's 400 metres hurdles event at the 2011 All-Africa Games was held on 14–15 September.

== Medalists ==
Gold	Silver	Bronze
Ajoke Odumosu; Nigeria	Wenda Theron; South Africa	Kou Luogon; Liberia

== Results ==
=== Heats ===
Qualification: First 3 of each heat (Q) and the next 2 fastest (q) qualified for the final.

Rank	Heat	Name	Nationality	Time	Notes
1	2	Ajoke Odumosu	Nigeria	57.53	Q
2	1	Maureen Jelagat Maiyo	Kenya	57.72	Q
3	1	Kou Luogon	Liberia	57.88	Q
4	1	Olga Razanamalala	Madagascar	58.08	Q
5	1	Oarabile Babolayi	Botswana	58.09	q
6	2	Wenda Theron	South Africa	58.25	Q
7	1	Leslie Njoku	Nigeria	58.86	q
8	2	Mame Fatou Faye	Senegal	59.04	Q
9	1	Nusrat Ceesay	Gambia	59.22	
10	2	Houria Moussa	Algeria	59.95	
11	2	Djeneba Coulibaly	Burkina Faso	1:01.13	
12	2	Tasabih Mohamed	Sudan	1:01.35	
13	1	Grace Gimo	Zimbabwe	1:06.35	
	2	Carole Kaboud Mebam	Cameroon	DNF	

=== Final ===
Rank	Name	Nationality	Time	Notes
1st place, gold medalist(s)	Ajoke Odumosu	Nigeria	56.26	
2nd place, silver medalist(s)	Wenda Theron	South Africa	57.13	
3rd place, bronze medalist(s)	Kou Luogon	Liberia	57.34	
4	Maureen Jelagat Maiyo	Kenya	57.49	
5	Mame Fatou Faye	Senegal	57.99	
6	Olga Razanamalala	Madagascar	58.78	
7	Oarabile Babolayi	Botswana	58.91	
8	Leslie Njoku	Nigeria	1:00.80	
