= Tameka Jameson =

Nigerian sprinter (born 1989)

Personal information
- Born: 11 August 1989 (age 37)

Sport
- Sport: Track and field
- Event: 400 metres hurdles
Medal record
Women's athletics
Representing Nigeria
African Championships
Bronze medal – third place	2016 Durban	400 m hurdles

Tameka Jameson (born 11 August 1989) is a Nigerian sprinter. She competed in the 4 × 400 metres relay at the 2016 IAAF World Indoor Championships. She grew up in the United States before starting to compete for Nigeria.

Jameson was an All-American hurdler for the Miami Hurricanes track and field team in the NCAA.

== Competition record ==
Year	Competition	Venue	Position	Event	Notes
Representing the United States
2015	NACAC U23 Championships	Miramar, United States	2nd	400 m hurdles	55.97
2015	NACAC U23 Championships	Miramar, United States	1st	4 × 400 m relay	3:29.80
Representing Nigeria
2016	World Indoor Championships	Portland, United States	4th	4 × 400 m relay	3:34.03
2016	African Championships	Durban, South Africa	3rd	400 m hurdles	57.17
