= Athletics at the 2018 Commonwealth Games – Women's 400 metres hurdles =

Women's 400 metres hurdles at the 2018 Commonwealth Games
- Venue: Carrara Stadium
- Dates: 10 April (heats); 12 April (final)
- Competitors: 16 from 12 nations
- Winning time: 54.33

Medalists
gold medal	Janieve Russell	Jamaica
silver medal	Eilidh Doyle	Scotland
bronze medal	Wenda Nel	South Africa

The women's 400 metres hurdles at the 2018 Commonwealth Games, as part of the athletics programme, took place in the Carrara Stadium on 10 and 12 April 2018.

== Records ==
Prior to this competition, the existing world and Games records were as follows:

World record	Yuliya Pechonkina (RUS)	52.34	Tula, Russia	8 August 2003
Games record	Jana Pittman (AUS)	53.82	Melbourne, Australia	23 March 2006

== Schedule ==
The schedule was as follows:

Date	Time	Round
Tuesday 10 April 2018	11:50	First round
Thursday 12 April 2018	19:30	Final

All times are Australian Eastern Standard Time (UTC+10)

== Results ==
=== First round ===
The first round consisted of two heats. The three fastest competitors per heat (plus two fastest losers) advanced to the final.

Heat 1

Rank	Lane	Name	Result	Notes	Qualified
1	8	Eilidh Doyle (SCO)	54.80		Q
2	5	Sparkle McKnight (TTO)	55.15	PB	Q
3	1	Sage Watson (CAN)	55.43		Q
4	4	Ristananna Tracey (JAM)	55.66		q
5	7	Katrina Seymour (BAH)	55.69	NR	
6	6	Meghan Beesley (ENG)	56.41		
7	3	Tia-Adana Belle (BAR)	56.55		
–	2	Rita Ossai (NGR)	DNF		

Heat 2

Rank	Lane	Name	Result	Notes	Qualified
1	4	Janieve Russell (JAM)	54.01	SB	Q
2	8	Wenda Nel (RSA)	54.61		Q
3	6	Glory Onome Nathaniel (NGR)	55.01	PB	Q
4	3	Ronda Whyte (JAM)	55.10		q
5	7	Lauren Wells (AUS)	55.73	SB	
6	5	Maureen Jelagat Maiyo (KEN)	57.66		
7	1	Jessica Turner (ENG)	58.26		
8	2	Caryl Granville (WAL)	59.28		

=== Final ===
The medals were determined in the final.

Rank	Lane	Name	Result	Notes
1st place, gold medalist(s)	5	Janieve Russell (JAM)	54.33	
2nd place, silver medalist(s)	3	Eilidh Doyle (SCO)	54.80	
3rd place, bronze medalist(s)	6	Wenda Nel (RSA)	54.96	
4	2	Ronda Whyte (JAM)	55.02	
5	8	Sage Watson (CAN)	55.55	
6	7	Glory Onome Nathaniel (NGR)	56.39	
7	4	Sparkle McKnight (TTO)	57.45	
8	1	Ristananna Tracey (JAM)	57.50	
