= Mame Fatou Faye =

Senegalese hurdler

Personal information
- Born: 19 August 1986 (age 39)

Sport
- Sport: Track and field
Medal record
Representing Senegal
African Championships
Bronze medal – third place	2008 Addis Ababa	4×400 m
Bronze medal – third place	2012 Porto-Novo	4×400 m
Summer Universiade
Bronze medal – third place	2009 Belgrade	4x400m

Mame Fatou Faye (born 19 August 1986) is a Senegalese athlete specialising in the 400 metres hurdles. Apart from hurdling, she runs in the 4 x 400 metres relay where she won several international medals.

Her personal best in her main event is 56.37 seconds set in Dakar in 2012.

== Competition record ==
Year	Competition	Venue	Position	Event	Notes
Representing Senegal
2005	African Junior Championships	Radès, Tunisia	3rd	100 m hurdles	14.59
2005	African Junior Championships	Radès, Tunisia	2nd	400 m hurdles	61.31
2005	African Junior Championships	Radès, Tunisia	3rd	4×400 m relay	3:48.85
2006	African Championships	Bambous, Mauritius	11th (h)	400 m hurdles	61.37
2007	All-Africa Games	Algiers, Algeria	9th (h)	400 m hurdles	58.97
2007	All-Africa Games	Algiers, Algeria	4th	4×400 m relay	3:34.88
2007	Universiade	Bangkok, Thailand	15th (sf)	400 m	55.27
2008	African Championships	Addis Ababa, Ethiopia	6th	400 m hurdles	58.33
2008	African Championships	Addis Ababa, Ethiopia	4th	4×100 m relay	45.63
2008	African Championships	Addis Ababa, Ethiopia	3rd	4×400 m relay	3:38.42
2009	Universiade	Belgrade, Serbia	8th	400 m hurdles	58.73
2009	Universiade	Belgrade, Serbia	3rd	4×400 m relay	3:36.33
2009	Jeux de la Francophonie	Beirut, Lebanon	4th	400 m hurdles	58.85
2009	Jeux de la Francophonie	Beirut, Lebanon	2nd	4×400 m relay	3:36.27
2011	Universiade	Shenzhen, China	12th (h)	400 m hurdles	57.56
2011	Universiade	Shenzhen, China	7th	4×400 m relay	3:43.15
2011	All-Africa Games	Maputo, Mozambique	5th	400 m hurdles	57.99
2012	African Championships	Porto-Novo, Benin	9th (h)	400 m hurdles	58.14
2013	Universiade	Kazan, Russia	12th (h)	400 m hurdles	58.90
2013	Jeux de la Francophonie	Nice, France	3rd	400 m hurdles	57.66
2014	African Championships	Marrakesh, Morocco	9th (h)	400 m hurdles	59.11
2014	African Championships	Marrakesh, Morocco	–	4×100 m relay	DNF
