= Anneri Ebersohn =

South African hurdler (born 1990)

Personal information
- Born: 9 August 1990 (age 35)
- Education: University of Pretoria
- Height: 1.68 m (5 ft 6 in)
- Weight: 57 kg (126 lb)

Sport
- Sport: Track and field
- Event: 400 metres hurdles

Anneri Ebersohn (born 9 August 1990) is a South African athlete specialising in the 400 metres hurdles. She represented her country at the 2013 World Championships in Moscow, failing to reach the semifinals.

Her personal best in the event is 55.87, set in Potchefstroom in 2013.

== Competition record ==
Year	Competition	Venue	Position	Event	Notes
Representing South Africa
2007	World Youth Championships	Ostrava, Czech Republic	9th (h)	400 m hurdles	60.79
2012	African Championships	Porto-Novo, Benin	15th (h)	400 m hurdles	60.12
2013	Universiade	Kazan, Russia	5th	400 m hurdles	57.58
2013	Universiade	Kazan, Russia	3rd	4 × 400 m relay	3:36.05
2013	World Championships	Moscow, Russia	25th (h)	400 m hurdles	57.90
2014	African Championships	Marrakesh, Morocco	5th	400 m hurdles	56.71
2015	Universiade	Gwangju, South Korea	9th (h)	400 m hurdles	57.91
2015	Universiade	Gwangju, South Korea	6th	4 × 400 m relay	3:46.73
2015	African Games	Brazzaville, Republic of the Congo	4th	400 m hurdles	58.68
