= Audrey Nkamsao =

Cameroonian athlete (born 1989)

Audrey Nkamsao Mbonda (born 28 July 1989) is a Cameroonian athlete competing in the 400 metres and 400 metres hurdles.

Her personal bests are 54.28 seconds in the 400 metres and 58.17 in the 400 metres hurdles.

== Competition record ==
Year	Competition	Venue	Position	Event	Notes
Representing Cameroon
2012	African Championships	Porto-Novo, Benin	17th (sf)	400 m	55.20
2012	African Championships	Porto-Novo, Benin	13th (h)	400 m hurdles	58.94
2013	Jeux de la Francophonie	Nice, France	12th (h)	400 m	56.41
2013	Jeux de la Francophonie	Nice, France	11th (h)	400 m hurdles	61.53
2013	Jeux de la Francophonie	Nice, France	7th	4 × 100 m relay	47.23
2014	African Championships	Marrakesh, Morocco	12th (h)	400 m	54.98
2014	African Championships	Marrakesh, Morocco	7th	400 m hurdles	58.90
2014	African Championships	Marrakesh, Morocco	5th	4 × 100 m relay	46.33
2014	African Championships	Marrakesh, Morocco	5th	4 × 400 m relay	3:43.59
2015	African Games	Brazzaville, Republic of the Congo	16th (sf)	400 m	56.33
2015	African Games	Brazzaville, Republic of the Congo	5th	400 m hurdles	59.18
2015	African Games	Brazzaville, Republic of the Congo	–	4 × 400 m relay	DQ
2016	African Championships	Durban, South Africa	9th (h)	400 m hurdles	59.70
2017	Jeux de la Francophonie	Abidjan, Ivory Coast	7th	400 m	55.74
2017	Jeux de la Francophonie	Abidjan, Ivory Coast	5th	400 m hurdles	60.53
2018	African Championships	Asaba, Nigeria	8th	400 m hurdles	61.35
2018	African Championships	Asaba, Nigeria	5th	4 × 100 m relay	46.26
2024	African Championships	Douala, Cameroon	12th (h)	400 m hurdles	61.42

== Personal bests ==
Outdoors

- 400 metres – 54.28 (Genève 2012)
- 400 metres hurdles – 58.17 (Genève 2015)

Indoors

- 400 metres – 54.96 (Aubiére 2012)
