= 2006 African Championships in Athletics – Women's 400 metres hurdles =

The women's 400 metres hurdles event at the 2006 African Championships in Athletics was held at the Stade Germain Comarmond on August 11–12.

== Medalists ==
Gold	Silver	Bronze
Janet Wienand; South Africa	Houria Moussa; Algeria	Aïssata Soulama; Burkina Faso

== Results ==
=== Heats ===
Rank	Heat	Name	Nationality	Time	Notes
1	2	Houria Moussa	Algeria	58.14	Q
2	2	Mary Onyemuwa	Nigeria	58.40	Q
3	1	Florence Wasike	Kenya	58.42	Q
4	1	Carole Kaboud Mebam	Cameroon	58.66	Q
5	1	Janet Wienand	South Africa	58.99	Q
6	1	Aïssata Soulama	Burkina Faso	59.40	q
7	2	Endurance Abinuwa	Nigeria	59.65	Q
8	1	Kate Chiwedu Obilor	Nigeria	1:00.01	q
9	2	Clémence Kombetto	Benin	1:00.39	
10	2	Lamiae Lhabze	Morocco	1:00.67	
11	1	Mame Fatou Faye	Senegal	1:01.37	
	2	Muna Jabir Adam	Sudan	DNS	

=== Final ===
Rank	Lane	Name	Nationality	Time	Notes
1st place, gold medalist(s)	2	Janet Wienand	South Africa	56.97	
2nd place, silver medalist(s)	4	Houria Moussa	Algeria	57.15	
3rd place, bronze medalist(s)	1	Aïssata Soulama	Burkina Faso	57.27	
4	6	Mary Onyemuwa	Nigeria	57.93	
5	8	Kate Chiwedu Obilor	Nigeria	58.08	
6	5	Florence Wasike	Kenya	58.11	
7	3	Carole Kaboud Mebam	Cameroon	58.46	
8	7	Endurance Abinuwa	Nigeria	1:00.63	
