= 2018 African Championships in Athletics – Women's 400 metres hurdles =

The women's 400 metres hurdles event at the 2018 African Championships in Athletics was held on 4 and 5 August in Asaba, Nigeria.

Glory Onome Nathaniel was placed first when the race was run, but was subsequently disqualified in 2019 after tested positive for stanozolol. The medals were reissued with Lhabze receiving the gold medal.

== Medalists ==
Gold	Silver	Bronze
Lamiae Lhabze; Morocco	Wenda Nel; South Africa	Maureen Jelagat Maiyo; Kenya

== Results ==
=== Heats ===
Qualification: First 3 of each heat (Q) and the next 2 fastest (q) qualified for the final.

Rank	Heat	Name	Nationality	Time	Notes
1	1	Lamiae Lhabze	Morocco	58.07	Q
2	1	Rita Ossai	Nigeria	58.22	Q
3	1	Jane Chege	Kenya	59.78	Q
4	1	Audrey Nkamsao	Cameroon	1:00.03	q
5	1	Rokya Fofana	Burkina Faso	?:??.??	
6	1	Gebeyanesh Gadecha	Ethiopia	1:00.88	
8	1	Abrar Osman Osman	Sudan	1:05.95	
1	2	Glory Onome Nathaniel	Nigeria	~~55.96~~	Q/DQ^{1}
2	2	Wenda Nel	South Africa	57.47	Q
3	2	Maureen Jelagat Maiyo	Kenya	?:??.??	Q
4	2	Uwemedino Akpan Abasiono	Nigeria	?:??.??	q
5	2	Olga Razanamalala	Madagascar	?:??.??	
6	2	Tasabih Mohamed	Sudan	?:??.??	
6	2	Fatoumata Koala	Burkina Faso	?:??.??	
	2	Mosisa Siyoum	Ethiopia	DNS	

=== Final ===
Rank	Lane	Athlete	Nationality	Time	Notes
1st place, gold medalist(s)	6	Lamiae Lhabze	Morocco	56.66	
2nd place, silver medalist(s)	4	Wenda Nel	South Africa	57.04	
3rd place, bronze medalist(s)	7	Maureen Jelagat Maiyo	Kenya	57.27	
4	5	Rita Ossai	Nigeria	59.11	
5	8	Jane Chege	Kenya	59.63	
6	1	Uwemedino Akpan Abasiono	Nigeria	1:00.57	
7	2	Audrey Nkamsao	Cameroon	1:01.35	
DQ	3	Glory Onome Nathaniel	Nigeria	~~55.53~~	^{1}

^{1}Disqualified after the games for doping
