= Lamiae Lhabze =

Moroccan hurdler (born 1984)

Personal information
- Born: 19 May 1984 (age 42)

Sport
- Sport: Athletics
- Events: 400 m hurdles, 100 m hurdles
Medal record
Women's athletics
Representing Morocco
African Championships
Gold medal – first place	2018 Asaba	400 m hurdles
Silver medal – second place	2008 Addis Ababa	400 m hurdles

Lamiae Lhabze (born 19 May 1984) is a Moroccan athlete competing in the 100 metres hurdles and 400 metres hurdles. She represented her country at the 2007 World Championships without advancing from the first round. In addition, she won multiple medals at international level.

She has personal bests of 55.51 seconds in the 400 metres hurdles (Mersin 2013) and 13.78 seconds in the 100 metres hurdles (−0.3 m/s, Khouribga 2013).

== International competitions ==
Year	Competition	Venue	Position	Event	Notes
Representing Morocco
2003	African Junior Championships	Garoua, Cameroon	4th	100 m hurdles	14.48
2003	African Junior Championships	Garoua, Cameroon	3rd	400 m hurdles	62.55
2003	African Junior Championships	Garoua, Cameroon	–	4 × 400 m relay	DNF
2005	Universiade	İzmir, Turkey	23rd (h)	400 m hurdles	59.67
2006	African Championships	Bambous, Mauritius	10th (h)	400 m hurdles	60.67
2006	African Championships	Bambous, Mauritius	–	Heptathlon	DNF
2007	Arab Championships	Amman, Jordan	1st	100 m hurdles	14.00
2007	Arab Championships	Amman, Jordan	2nd	400 m hurdles	57.71
2007	Universiade	Bangkok, Thailand	9th (h)	400 m hurdles	57.90
2007	World Championships	Osaka, Japan	34th (h)	400 m hurdles	57.81
2007	Pan Arab Games	Cairo, Egypt	1st	100 m hurdles	14.21
2007	Pan Arab Games	Cairo, Egypt	4th	400 m hurdles	59.88
2007	Pan Arab Games	Cairo, Egypt	1st	4 × 100 m relay	47.42
2007	Pan Arab Games	Cairo, Egypt	2nd	4 × 400 m relay	3:44.85
2008	African Championships	Addis Ababa, Ethiopia	2nd	400 m hurdles	56.07
2008	African Championships	Addis Ababa, Ethiopia	4th	4 × 400 m relay	3:41.54
2009	Jeux de la Francophonie	Beirut, Lebanon	2nd	400 m hurdles	58.81
2009	Jeux de la Francophonie	Beirut, Lebanon	3rd	4 × 400 m relay	3:37.72
2009	Arab Championships	Damascus, Syria	3rd	100 m hurdles	14.39
2009	Arab Championships	Damascus, Syria	2nd	400 m hurdles	57.86
2009	Arab Championships	Damascus, Syria	2nd	4 × 100 m relay	47.98
2009	Arab Championships	Damascus, Syria	1st	4 × 400 m relay	3:40.58
2011	Arab Championships	Al Ain, United Arab Emirates	2nd	100 m hurdles	14.23
2011	Arab Championships	Al Ain, United Arab Emirates	2nd	400 m hurdles	58.48
2011	Arab Championships	Al Ain, United Arab Emirates	1st	4 × 100 m relay	46.84
2011	Arab Championships	Al Ain, United Arab Emirates	1st	4 × 400 m relay	3:40.58
2011	Pan Arab Games	Doha, Qatar	1st	100 m hurdles	13.88
2011	Pan Arab Games	Doha, Qatar	2nd	400 m hurdles	57.55
2011	Pan Arab Games	Doha, Qatar	1st	4 × 400 m relay	3:38.64
2012	African Championships	Porto-Novo, Benin	7th	400 m hurdles	57.35
2013	Arab Championships	Doha, Qatar	2nd	400 m hurdles	59.83
2013	Arab Championships	Doha, Qatar	1st	4 × 100 m relay	46.59
2013	Arab Championships	Doha, Qatar	1st	4 × 400 m relay	3:42.10
2013	Mediterranean Games	Mersin, Turkey	2nd	400 m hurdles	55.51
2013	Mediterranean Games	Mersin, Turkey	–	4 × 400 m relay	DQ
2013	Jeux de la Francophonie	Nice, France	6th	400 m hurdles	58.89
2013	Jeux de la Francophonie	Nice, France	4th	4 × 400 m relay	3:37.48
2013	Islamic Solidarity Games	Palembang, Indonesia	4th	100 m hurdles	14.17
2013	Islamic Solidarity Games	Palembang, Indonesia	2nd	400 m hurdles	58.16
2013	Islamic Solidarity Games	Palembang, Indonesia	2nd	4 × 100 m relay	47.18
2013	Islamic Solidarity Games	Palembang, Indonesia	1st	4 × 400 m relay	3:38.56
2014	African Championships	Marrakesh, Morocco	11th (h)	100 m hurdles	14.59
2014	African Championships	Marrakesh, Morocco	6th	400 m hurdles	57.24
2015	Arab Championships	Isa Town, Bahrain	1st	100 m hurdles	13.53
2015	Arab Championships	Isa Town, Bahrain	1st	400 m hurdles	56.65
2018	African Championships	Asaba, Nigeria	1st	400 m hurdles	56.66
2019	Arab Championships	Cairo, Egypt	1st	100 m hurdles	14.31
2019	Arab Championships	Cairo, Egypt	2nd	400 m hurdles	59.05
2019	African Games	Rabat, Morocco	2nd	400 m hurdles	56.97
2019	World Championships	Doha, Qatar	34th (h)	400 m hurdles	57.66
