= 2009 African Junior Athletics Championships =

9th African Junior Championships
- Dates: 30 July – 2 August
- Host city: Bambous, Mauritius
- Venue: Stade Germain Comarmond
- Level: Under-20
- Events: 40

The 2009 African Junior Athletics Championships were held in Bambous, Mauritius from 30 July to 2 August. There were 40 events in total, of which 20 were contested by male athletes and 20 by female athletes. Multiple gold medallists Caster Semenya and Amaka Ogoegbunam broke championships records, but also created controversy at the 2009 World Championships in Athletics later that year. Semenya was asked to take a gender test and Ogoegbunam tested positive for anabolic steroids.

== Records ==
Key:	WR — World record • AR — Area record • CR — Championship record • NR — National record • WL — World leading

Name	Event	Country	Record	Type
James Magut	1500 metres	Kenya	3:37.05	CR
Cornel Fredericks	400 m hurdles	South Africa	50.05 sec	CR
Cheyne Rahme	Pole vault	South Africa	5.30 m	CR
Ali Bouguesba	Triple jump	Algeria	16.16 m	CR
Alaa Elaslry	Hammer throw	Egypt	75.59 m	CR
Gert Swanepoel	Decathlon	South Africa	6400 pts	NR
Caster Semenya	800 metres	South Africa	1:56.72	NR CR WL
Caster Semenya	1500 metres	South Africa	4:08.01	CR
Amaka Ogoegbunam	400 m hurdles	Nigeria	58.45 sec	CR
Rana Taha	Hammer throw	Egypt	57.53 m	CR

== Medal summary ==
=== Men ===
Event	Gold		Silver		Bronze	
100 metres	Abdehadi Bouchakour (ALG)	10.75	Nathaniel Oletu (NGR)	10.86	Waide Jooste (RSA)	10.94
200 metres	Youssouf Mhadjou (COM)	22.47	Ayobani Oyebiyi (NGR)	22.58	Adeola Efunsile (NGR)	22.66
400 metres	Pako Seribe (BOT)	46.56	Abiola Onakoya (NGR)	47.16	Thapelo Ketlogetswe (BOT)	47.43
800 metres	Mohamed Aman Geleto (ETH)	1:48.82	Nickson Tuwei (KEN)	1:48.91	David Mutinda (KEN)	1:49.82
1500 metres	James Magut (KEN)	3:37.05 CR	Nickson Chepseba (KEN)	3:37.63	Dawit Wolde Arega (ETH)	3:41.24
5000 metres	Abera Kuma Lema (ETH)	13:42.53	John Mwangangi (KEN)	13:42.88	Kennedy Kithuka (KEN)	13:43.94
10,000 metres	Lelisa Desisa Benti (ETH)	28.46.74	John Cheruiyot (KEN)	28:47.89	Peter Kimeli (KEN)	28:53.64
110 metres hurdles	Cornel Fredericks (RSA)	14.36	Martins Ogieriakhi (NGR)	14.42	Hardus Maritz (NAM)	14.73
400 metres hurdles	Cornel Fredericks (RSA)	50.05 CR	Amadou Ndiaye (SEN)	52.44	Hardus Maritz (NAM)	52.61
3000 metres steeplechase	Jonathan Muia Ndiku (KEN)	8:28.83	Stephen Kiprotich (KEN)	8:35.97	Legesse Lemesso Lemesso (ETH)	8:39.53
4×100 metres relay	Nigeria (NGR); Ayobani Oyebiyi; Abiola Onakoya; Adeola Efunsile; Nathaniel Oletu	41.17	South Africa (RSA); Waide Jootse; Brent Stevens; Patrick Vosloo; Ethan Floris	41.33	Mauritius (MUS); Baptiste Brasse; Aldo Lutchmun; Garik Maureemootoo; Unknown runner	42.08
4×400 metres relay	Nigeria (NGR); Okeudo Jonathan Mmaju; Elvis Ukale; Peter Njoteah; Abiola Onakoya	3:13.50	South Africa (RSA); Shaun de Jager; Cornel Fredericks; Peter Marx; Neil de Beer	3:13.95	Botswana (BOT); Otlaadisa Segosebe; Daniel Lagamang; Pako Seribe; Thapelo Ketlogetswe	3:15.08
High jump	Mohamed Abou Taleb (EGY)	2.09 m	Ruan Claasen (RSA)	2.09 m	Jose Labiche (SEY)	2.02 m
Pole vault	Cheyne Rahme (RSA)	5.30 m CR	Mohammed Bouhadjer (ALG)	4.35 m	Yannick Clam (MUS)	3.95 m
Long jump	Alaeddin Ben Hassine (TUN)	7.67 m	Ali Bouguesba (ALG)	7.52 m	Luvo Manyonga (RSA)	7.49 m
Triple jump	Ali Bouguesba (ALG)	16.16 m CR PB	Newton Kipngeno (KEN)	15.62 m PB	Apelele Raskeni (RSA)	15.53 m
Shot put	Stephan Brink (RSA)	17.90 m	Abddouahat Laggoun (ALG)	16.38 m	Victor Akinyemi (NGR)	15.03 m
Discus throw	Dewald van Heerden (RSA)	58.91 m	Christophe Sophie (MUS)	46.02 m	Abdouahat Laggoiun (ALG)	43.14 m
Hammer throw	Alaa Elaslry (EGY)	75.59 m CR	Jonathan Martin (MUS)	42.81 m	Ian Caree (MUS)	31.64 m
Javelin throw	Ulrich Damon (RSA)	73.51 m	Strydom van der Wath (NAM)	67.69 m	John Phalatswe (BOT)	60.46 m
Decathlon	Gert Swanepoel (RSA)	6400 pts PB NR	Willem le Roux (RSA)	6359 pts PB	Eslam Shaaban (EGY)	6030 pts

=== Women ===
Event	Gold		Silver		Bronze	
100 metres	Josephine Omaka (NGR)	11.78	Alyssa Conley (RSA)	12.17	Stephanie Guillaume (MUS)	12.23
200 metres (Note: The original gold medalist, Amaka Ogoegbunam of Nigeria, was stripped of her gold medal for having committed anti-doping violations. The rest of the competitors were elevated by one position accordingly.)	Alyssa Conley (RSA)	25.55	Stephanie Guillaume (MUS)	25.63	Elodie Pierrelouis (MRI)	25.86
400 metres	Folashade Abugan (NGR)	52.02 CR	Racheal Nachula (ZAM)	53.34	Sylvie Zimbere (CMR)	54.03 PB
800 metres	Caster Semenya (RSA)	1:56.72 NR CR PB WL	Winny Chebet (KEN)	2:01.36 PB	Abebe Aregawi Gebretsadik (ETH)	2:02.17 NR
1500 metres	Caster Semenya (RSA)	4:08.01 PB CR	Kalkidan Gezagne Befrkad (ETH)	4:09.36	Fancy Cherotich (KEN)	4:17.38
3000 metres	Mercy Cherono (KEN)	8:54.96	Etenesh Diro Neda (ETH)	9:09.22	Tsaga Gela Reta (ETH)	9:25.31
5000 metres	Genzebe Dibaba (ETH)	16:11.85	Mercy Cherono (KEN)	16:12.65	Sule Utura Gedo (ETH)	16:13.09
100 metres hurdles	Silvia Panguana (MOZ)	15.95	Lawretta Ozoh (NGR)	16.21	none awarded	
400 metres hurdles	Bimbo Miel Ayedou (BEN)	1:00.09	Betty Chelangat (KEN)	1:01.30	Fancy Cherotich (KEN)	1:06.31
3000 metres steeplechase	Elizabeth Mueni (KEN)	9:58.55	Almaz Ayona Eba (ETH)	10:03.75	Tsehynesh Tsale Tsenga (ETH)	10:09.00
4×100 metres relay	Mauritius (MUS); Joanelle Janvier; Elodie Pierrelouis; Stephanie Guillaume; Emilie Tambanivoule	48.04	Cameroon (CMR); Giesele Tchoupou Tchoupa; Marie Rodrigue Ngono Zibi; Sylvie Zimbere; Blandin Loise Tsouga Eb	48.58	South Africa (RSA); Melissa Hewitt; Caster Semenya; Rorisang Rammonye; Alyssa Conley	48.73
4×400 metres relay	Kenya (KEN); Shiela Chepkirui; Fancy Cherotich; Winny Chebet; Betty Chelangat	?	Mauritius (MUS); Edlette Espiegle; Stephanie Guillaume; Emile Tambanivoule; Dorothy Aristide	?	Cameroon (CMR); Marie Rodrigue Ngono Zibi; Blandin Loise Tsouga Eb; Sylvie Zimbere; Giesele Tchoupou Tchoupa	?
High jump	Lissa Labiche (SEY)	1.69 m	Wedian Mokhtar (EGY)	1.55 m	Emilie Tambanivole (MUS)	1.40 m
Long jump	Sangone Kandji (SEN)	5.82 m	Janet Boniface (SEY)	5.78 m	Ibrahim Blessing (NGR)	5.75 m
Triple jump	Ibrahim Blessing (NGR)	12.89 m	Janet Boniface (SEY)	12.12 m	Ambre de Falbaire (MUS)	12.00 m
Shot put	Walaa Attia (EGY)	14.47 m	Sihem Marrakechi (TUN)	13.97 m	Zouina Bouzebra (ALG)	12.84 m
Discus throw	Lindie Liebenberg (RSA)	43.24 m	Estelle Louis (MUS)	34.93 m	Aurelie Thesee (MUS)	31.04 m
Hammer throw	Rana Taha (EGY)	57.53 m CR	Zouina Bouzebra (ALG)	54.47 m	Najet Ben Chiha (TUN)	47.92 m
Javelin throw	Tazmin Brits (RSA)	54.55 m	Gazelle Bernard (RSA)	49.54 m	Jessika Rosun (MUS)	44.42 m
Heptathlon	Jenna Rima (MUS)	4336 pts	Wedian Mokhtar (EGY)	3933 pts	Marine Boulle (MUS)	3811 pts

== Medal table ==
* Host nation (Mauritius)

Rank	Nation	Gold	Silver	Bronze	Total
1	South Africa (RSA)	11	7	4	22
2	Nigeria (NGR)	9	4	4	17
3	Kenya (KEN)	4	9	5	18
4	Ethiopia (ETH)	4	3	6	13
5	Egypt (EGY)	4	2	1	7
6	Algeria (ALG)	2	4	2	8
7	Mauritius (MUS)*	2	3	11	16
8	Seychelles (SEY)	1	2	1	4
9	Tunisia (TUN)	1	1	1	3
10	Senegal (SEN)	1	1	0	2
11	Botswana (BOT)	1	0	3	4
12	Comoros (COM)	1	0	0	1
13	Namibia (NAM)	0	1	2	3
14	Cameroon (CMR)	0	1	1	2
15	Benin (BEN)	0	1	0	1
15	Mozambique (MOZ)	0	1	0	1
15	Zambia (ZAM)	0	1	0	1
Totals (17 entries)		41	41	41	123
