= Aïssata Soulama =

Burkinabé hurdler

Personal information
- Born: 11 February 1979 (age 47)
- Height: 170 cm (5 ft 7 in)
- Weight: 57 kg (126 lb)
Medal record
Women's athletics
Representing Burkina Faso
All-Africa Games
Silver medal – second place	2007 Algiers	400 m hurdles
Jeux de la Francophonie
Silver medal – second place	2005 Niamey	400 m hurdles
African Championships
Bronze medal – third place	2006 Bambous	400 m hurdles
Bronze medal – third place	2008 Addis Ababa	400 m hurdles

Aïssata Soulama (born 11 February 1979) is a Burkinabé track and field athlete who specialises in the 400 metres hurdles. She also holds the current Burkinabé record 53.81 on 400 metres.

She competed at the 2008 Summer Olympics in Beijing, in the 400 metre hurdles, where she marginally qualified for the second round, being the slowest of the qualifiers with a time of 56.37 seconds.

== Competition record ==
Year	Competition	Venue	Position	Event	Notes
Representing Burkina Faso
2003	World Championships	Paris, France	25th (h)	400 m hrd	61.86
2003	All-Africa Games	Abuja, Nigeria	5th	100 m hrd	14.42
2003	All-Africa Games	Abuja, Nigeria	4th	400 m hrd	58.94
2003	Afro-Asian Games	Hyderabad, India	4th	400 m hrd	57.99
2004	African Championships	Brazzaville, Republic of the Congo	6th	400 m hrd	58.97
2004	African Championships	Brazzaville, Republic of the Congo	6th	4 × 100 m relay	46.77
2004	Olympic Games	Athens, Greece	30th (h)	400 m hrd	57.60
2005	World Championships	Helsinki, Finland	29th (h)	400 m hrd	59.28
2005	Jeux de la Francophonie	Niamey, Niger	2nd	400 m hrd	58.40
2006	African Championships	Bambous, Mauritius	3rd	400 m hrd	57.27
2007	All-Africa Games	Algiers, Algeria	2nd	400 m hrd	55.49
2007	World Championships	Osaka, Japan	27th (h)	400 m hrd	57.06
2008	African Championships	Addis Ababa, Ethiopia	3rd	400 m hrd	56.13
2008	Olympic Games	Beijing, China	11th (sf)	400 m hrd	55.69
2009	World Championships	Berlin, Germany	34th (h)	400 m hrd	59.20
2009	Jeux de la Francophonie	Beirut, Lebanon	7th	400 m hrd	60.93
2010	African Championships	Nairobi, Kenya	5th	400 m hrd	57.19

Olympic Games
Preceded by Mamadou Ouedraogo	Flagbearer for Burkina Faso; 2008 Beijing	Succeeded by Séverine Nébié
