= Hayat Lambarki =

Moroccan hurdler (born 1988)

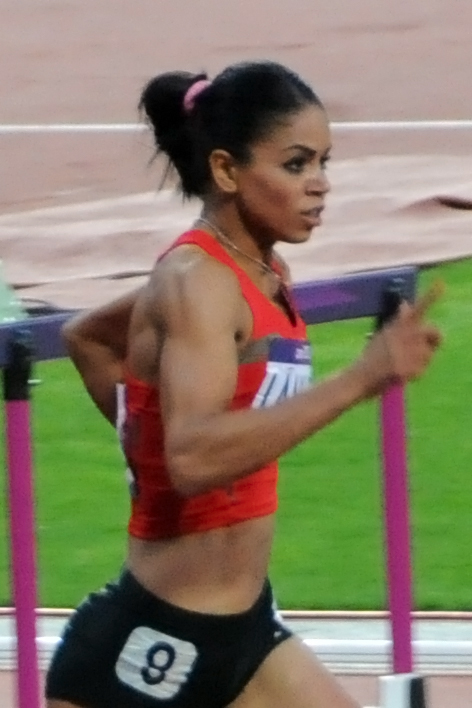
- Lambarki at the 2012 Olympics

Personal information
- Nationality: Morocco
- Born: 18 May 1988 (age 38) Safi, Morocco
- Height: 1.72 m (5 ft 8 in)
- Weight: 57 kg (126 lb) (2012)

Sport
- Sport: Athletics
- Event: 400 m hurdles
Medal record
Women's athletics
Representing Morocco
African Championships
Gold medal – first place	2010 Nairobi	400 m hurdles
Silver medal – second place	2012 Porto-Novo	400 m hurdles
Mediterranean Games
Gold medal – first place	2013 Mersin	400 m hurdles

Hayat Lambarki (Arabic: حياة لمباركي; born 18 May 1988) is a Moroccan track and field athlete specializing in the 400 metres hurdles.

She competed in the 2012 Summer Olympics where she got to the semifinals. Her personal best in the event is 55.27 achieved at the 2013 Mediterranean Games in Mersin.

== International competitions ==
Year	Competition	Venue	Position	Event	Notes
2005	World Youth Championships	Marrakesh, Morocco	8th	400 m hurdles	61.76
2005	World Youth Championships	Marrakesh, Morocco	8th	Medley relay	2:12.85
2005	Jeux de la Francophonie	Niamey, Niger	8th	400 m hurdles	62.33
2006	World Junior Championships	Beijing, China	30th (h)	400 m hurdles	63.54
2007	African Junior Championships	Ouagadougou, Burkina Faso	4th	100 m hurdles	14.85
2007	African Junior Championships	Ouagadougou, Burkina Faso	2nd	400 m hurdles	59.10
2008	African Championships	Addis Ababa, Ethiopia	4th	4 × 400 m relay	3:41.54
2009	Mediterranean Games	Pescara, Italy	5th	400 m hurdles	57.75
2009	Jeux de la Francophonie	Beirut, Lebanon	1st	400 m hurdles	58.40
2009	Jeux de la Francophonie	Beirut, Lebanon	3rd	4 × 400 m relay	3:37.72
2009	Arab Championships	Damascus, Syria	1st	400 m hurdles	57.27
2009	Arab Championships	Damascus, Syria	2nd	4 × 100 m relay	47.98
2009	Arab Championships	Damascus, Syria	1st	4 × 400 m relay	3:40.58
2010	African Championships	Nairobi, Kenya	1st	400 m hurdles	55.96
2011	Arab Championships	Al Ain, United Arab Emirates	1st	400 m hurdles	58.11
2011	Arab Championships	Al Ain, United Arab Emirates	1st	4 × 100 m relay	46.84
2011	Arab Championships	Al Ain, United Arab Emirates	1st	4 × 400 m relay	3:40.58
2011	Pan Arab Games	Doha, Qatar	1st	400 m hurdles	56.72
2011	Pan Arab Games	Doha, Qatar	1st	4 × 100 m relay	46.16
2011	Pan Arab Games	Doha, Qatar	1st	4 × 400 m relay	3:38.64
2012	African Championships	Porto-Novo, Benin	2nd	400 m hurdles	55.41
2012	Olympic Games	London, United Kingdom	18th (sf)	400 m hurdles	56.18
2013	Arab Championships	Doha, Qatar	1st	400 m hurdles	57.59
2013	Arab Championships	Doha, Qatar	1st	4 × 100 m relay	46.59
2013	Arab Championships	Doha, Qatar	1st	4 × 400 m relay	3:42.10
2013	Mediterranean Games	Mersin, Turkey	1st	400 m hurdles	55.27
2013	Mediterranean Games	Mersin, Turkey	–	4 × 400 m relay	DQ
2013	World Championships	Moscow, Russia	27th (h)	400 m hurdles	58.00
2013	Jeux de la Francophonie	Nice, France	1st	400 m hurdles	57.52
2013	Jeux de la Francophonie	Nice, France	4th	4 × 400 m relay	3:37.48
2013	Islamic Solidarity Games	Palembang, Indonesia	1st	400 m hurdles	57.92
2013	Islamic Solidarity Games	Palembang, Indonesia	2nd	4 × 100 m relay	47.18
2013	Islamic Solidarity Games	Palembang, Indonesia	1st	4 × 400 m relay	3:38.56
2014	African Championships	Marrakesh, Morocco	4th	400 m hurdles	55.93
2015	Arab Championships	Isa Town, Bahrain	3rd	400 m hurdles	59.33
2015	World Championships	Beijing, China	31st (h)	400 m hurdles	58.05
2016	Olympic Games	Rio de Janeiro, Brazil	44th (h)	400 m hurdles	60.83
2017	Islamic Solidarity Games	Baku, Azerbaijan	6th	400 m hurdles	58.77
2017	Islamic Solidarity Games	Baku, Azerbaijan	–	4 × 400 m relay	DQ
