= Janet Lawless =

South African athlete

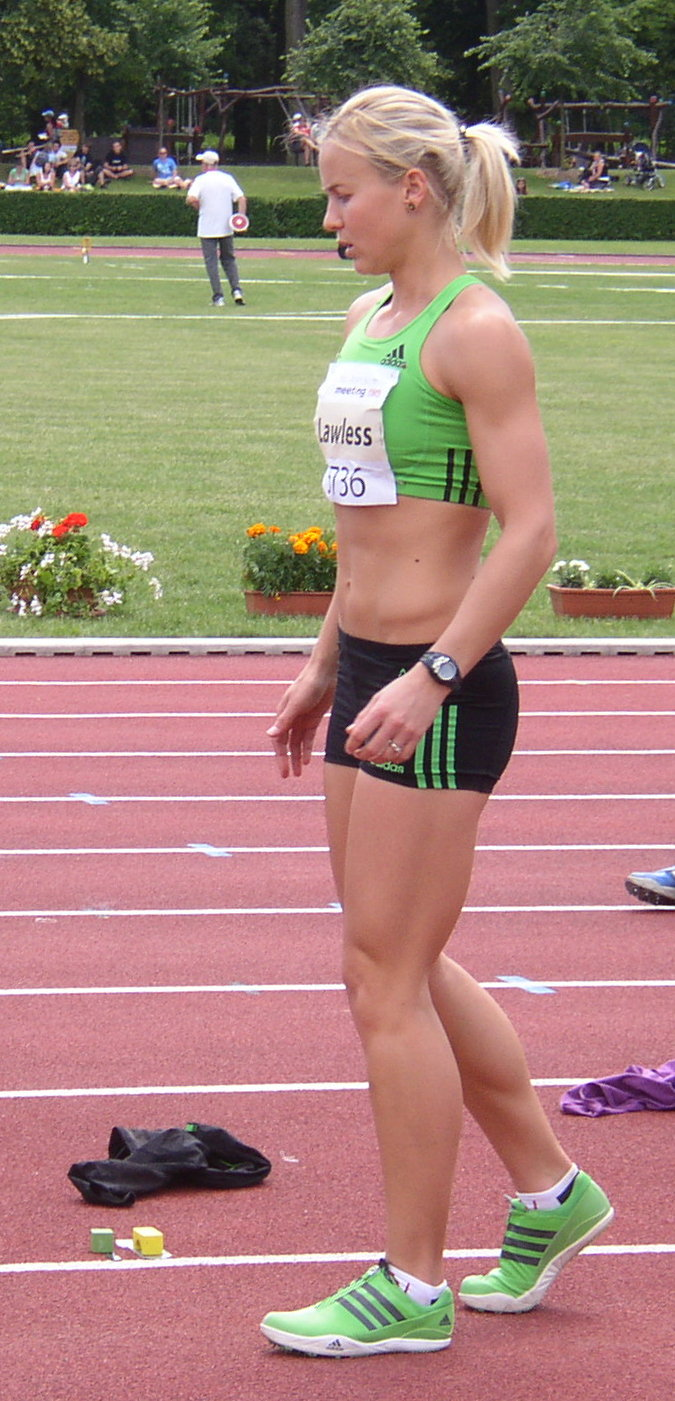
- Janet Lawless in 2011.

Medal record

Women's athletics

Representing South Africa

African Championships
Gold medal – first place	2006 Bambous	400 m hurdles
Gold medal – first place	2006 Bambous	4×400 m
Silver medal – second place	2010 Nairobi	Heptathlon

Janet Lawless née Wienand (born 15 May 1985) is a South African athlete competing in the heptathlon and 400 metres hurdles.

== Competition record ==
Year	Competition	Venue	Position	Event	Notes
Representing South Africa
2006	African Championships	Bambous, Mauritius	1st	400 m hurdles	56.97
2006	African Championships	Bambous, Mauritius	1st	4×400 m relay	3:36.88
2007	All-Africa Games	Algiers, Algeria	8th	400 m hurdles	61.69
2009	Universiade	Belgrade, Serbia	12th (h)	400 m hurdles	59.19
2010	African Championships	Bambous, Mauritius	2nd	Heptathlon	5500 pts
2011	Universiade	Shenzhen, China	16th	Heptathlon	5149 pts
2012	African Championships	Porto-Novo, Benin	8th	400 m hurdles	57.56

== Personal bests ==
- 200 m – 25.38 (+0.5) (Nairobi 2010)
- 400 m – 53.61 (Pretoria 2008)
- 800 m – 2:17.76 (Réduit 2011)
- 100 m hurdles – 13.83 (-0.5) (Kladno 2011)
- 400 m hurdles – 56.01 (Pretoria 2006)
- High jump – 1.76 (Réduit 2011)
- Long jump – 5.83 (+1.9) (Nairobi 2010)
- Shot put – 11.49 (Réduit 2011)
- Javelin throw – 38.12 (Nairobi 2010)
- Heptathlon – 5736 (Réduit 2010)
