= Mariyana Dimitrova =

Bulgarian sprinter

Mariyana Dimitrova (Bulgarian: Марияна Димитрова) (born 29 July 1982) is a Bulgarian sprint athlete who specializes in the women's 400 metres.

She finished sixth in the 400 m final at the 2006 IAAF World Indoor Championships in Moscow, and fourth at the 2006 European Athletics Championships in Gothenburg, the latter in a personal best time of 50.64 seconds. She also competed in the same event at the 2004 Olympics, reaching the semi-finals.
