= Amaka Ogoegbunam =

Nigerian sprinter

Personal information
- Born: 3 March 1990 (age 36)
- Height: 1.64 m (5 ft 4 1/2 in)
- Weight: 61 kg (134 lb)

Sport
- Country: Nigeria
- Sport: Track and field
- Event: 400 metres hurdles
Medal record
Women's athletics
Representing Nigeria
African Games
Gold medal – first place	2015 Brazzaville	400 m hurdles
African Championships
Silver medal – second place	2014 Marrakesh	400 m hurdles

Amaka Ogoegbunam (born 3 March 1990) is a Nigerian sprinter. She competed in the 400 metres hurdles event at the 2015 World Championships in Athletics in Beijing, China.

== Doping ban ==
Ogoegbunam tested positive for the anabolic steroid metenolone at the 2009 African Junior Athletics Championships in sample collected on 31 July 2009. Before the analyse of the sample was completed she competed at the 2009 World Championships in Athletics in Berlin, where she also tested positive for the same steroid in a sample collected on 18 August. She subsequently received a 3-year doping ban from sports, at the age of 19. The ban ended 30 July 2012.

== International competitions ==
Year	Competition	Venue	Position	Event	Notes
2009	African Junior Championships	Bambous, Mauritius	DQ (1st)	200 m	DQ (25.37)
2009	African Junior Championships	Bambous, Mauritius	DQ (1st)	100 m hurdles	DQ (14.28)
2009	African Junior Championships	Bambous, Mauritius	DQ (1st)	400 m hurdles	DQ (58.45)
2009	African Junior Championships	Bambous, Mauritius	DQ (1st)	4 × 400 m relay	DQ
2009	World Championships	Berlin, Germany	DQ (DNF semis)	400 m	DQ (52.85)
2009	World Championships	Berlin, Germany	DQ (DNS semis)	400 m hurdles	DQ (55.80)
2015	World Championships	Beijing, China	33rd (h)	400 m hurdles	58.16
