= List of Scottish records in athletics =

The Scottish records in athletics are ratified by Scottish Athletics, Scotland's governing body for the sport of athletics. At senior level records set by an athlete eligible to represent Scotland are recognised as National Records.

== Outdoor ==
Key to tables: Awaiting ratification Record not kept by Scottish Athletics Not ratified or later rescinded by Scottish Athletics

=== Men ===
Event	Record	Athlete	Date	Meet	Place	Ref.
100 m	10.11	Allan Wells	24 July 1980	Olympic Games	Moscow, Soviet Union	
200 m	20.21	Allan Wells	28 July 1980	Olympic Games	Moscow, Soviet Union	
400 m	44.93	David Jenkins	21 June 1975		Eugene OR, United States	
800 m	1:43.65	Jake Wightman	2 September 2022	Memorial Van Damme	Brussels, Belgium	
1000 m	2:12.77	Jake Wightman	10 July 2026	Herculis	Fontvieille, Monaco	
1500 m	3:27.62+	Josh Kerr	18 July 2026	London Athletics Meet	London, England	
Mile	3:42.66	Josh Kerr	18 July 2026	London Athletics Meet	London, England	
Mile (road)	3:57.60	Chris O'Hare	16 June 2019	Adidas Boost Boston Games	Boston, United States	
Mile (road)	3:44.3 a	Josh Kerr	8 September 2024	New Balance Fifth Avenue Mile	New York City, United States	
3000 m	7:35.18	Andrew Butchart	13 July 2021	British Grand Prix	Gateshead, England	
5000 m	13:08.61	Andrew Butchart	20 August 2016	Olympic Games	Rio de Janeiro, Brazil	
5 km (road)	13:34	Nat Muir	27 March 1985		Newcastle, England	
10,000 m	27:36.77	Andrew Butchart	6 March 2022	Sound Running Ten	San Juan Capistrano, United States	
10 km (road)	28:02	Callum Hawkins	12 January 2020	10K Valencia Ibercaja	Valencia, Spain	
15 km (road)	42:37+	Callum Hawkins	5 February 2017	Marugame Half Marathon	Marugame, Japan	
One hour	20200 m	James Alder	9 November 1968		Leicester, England	
20 km (road)	56:55+	Callum Hawkins	5 February 2017	Marugame Half Marathon	Marugame, Japan	
Half marathon	1:00:00	Callum Hawkins	5 February 2017	Marugame Half Marathon	Marugame, Japan	
25 km (road)	1:15:51	Graham Laing	2 May 1982		Berlin, Germany	
25 km (road)	1:14:50+	Callum Hawkins	28 April 2019	London Marathon	London, England	
30 km (road)	1:29:50+	Callum Hawkins	28 April 2019	London Marathon	London, England	
Marathon	2:08:14	Callum Hawkins	28 April 2019	London Marathon	London, England	
110 m hurdles	13.44	Chris Baillie	21 March 2006	Commonwealth Games	Melbourne, Australia	
400 m hurdles	50.04	Jack Lawrie	23 July 2023	England Athletics Senior & Para Open Championships	Chelmsford, England	
3000 m steeplechase	8:12.58	Tom Hanlon	3 August 1991	Herculis	Fontvieille, Monaco	
High jump	2.31 m	Geoff Parsons	24 August 1994	Commonwealth Games	Victoria BC, Canada	
Pole vault	5.65 m	Jax Thoirs	16 May 2015		Westwood, California, United States	
Long jump	8.01 m	Darren Ritchie	16 June 2004		Guadalajara, Spain	
Triple jump	16.17 m	John MacKenzie	17 September 1994		Bedford, England	
Shot put	18.93 m	Paul Buxton	13 May 1977		Westwood, California, United States	
Discus throw	67.73 m	Nicholas Percy	6 April 2024	Oklahoma Throws Series	Ramona, United States	
Discus throw	67.86 m	Nicholas Percy	17 April 2025	Oklahoma Throws Series	Ramona, United States	
Hammer throw	76.93 m	Mark Dry	17 May 2015		Loughborough, England	
Javelin throw	80.38 m	James Campbell	18 July 2010		Dunfermline, Scotland	
Decathlon	7867 pts	Callum Newby	9–10 April 2026	Bryan Clay Invitational	Azusa, United States	
Decathlon	100m (wind) / Long jump (wind) / Shot put / High jump / 400m / 110m H (wind) / Discus / Pole vault / Javelin / 1500m; 10.96 (+1.9 m/s) / 7.46 m (+1.2 m/s) / 12.93 m / 2.01 m / 48.63 / 14.50 (+1.4 m/s) / 40.15 m / 5.00 m / 49.09 m / 4:44.33					
20 km walk (road)	1:25:42	Martin Bell	9 May 1992		Lancaster, England	
50 km walk (road)	4:20:22	Scott Davies	13 September 2009			
4 × 100 m relay	39.24	Scotland; Allan Wells; David Jenkins; Cameron Sharp; Drew McMaster	12 August 1978	Commonwealth Games	Edmonton, Canada	
4 × 400 m relay	3:03.94	Scotland; Kris Robertson; Jamie Bowie; Greg Louden; Grant Plenderleith	1 August 2014	Commonwealth Games	Glasgow, Great Britain	

=== Women ===
Event	Record	Athlete	Date	Meet	Place	Ref.
100 m	11.30 (+1.9 m/s)	Alisha Rees	17 July 2022	Newham & Essex Beagles Summer Series	Stratford, England	
200 m	22.59 (−1.3 m/s)	Beth Dobbin	1 July 2018	British Championships	Birmingham, England	
400 m	50.71	Allison Curbishley	18 September 1998	Commonwealth Games	Kuala Lumpur, Malaysia	
600 m	1:26.76 A	Jemma Reekie	1 February 2022		Potchefstroom, South Africa	
800 m	1:55.61	Jemma Reekie	20 July 2024	London Athletics Meet	London, England	
1000 m	2:30.82	Laura Muir	14 August 2020	Herculis	Fontvieille, Monaco	
1500 m	3:53.37	Laura Muir	10 August 2024	Olympic Games	Saint-Denis, France	
Mile	4:15.24	Laura Muir	21 July 2023	Herculis	Fontvieille, Monaco	
Mile (road)
Mile (road)	4:23.25	Jemma Reekie	6 September 2026	New Balance Kö Meile	Düsseldorf, Germany	
Mile (road)	4:13.8 a	Jemma Reekie	13 September 2026	New Balance Fifth Avenue Mile	New York City, United States	
3000 m	8:29.02	Yvonne Murray	25 September 1988	Olympic Games	Seoul, South Korea	
5000 m	14:28.55	Eilish McColgan	1 July 2021	Bislett Games	Oslo, Norway	
5 km (road)	14:45 Mx	Eilish McColgan	24 April 2022	Meta : Time : Trials	Málaga, Spain	
5 km (road)	14:48 Wo	Eilish McColgan	12 February 2022	Super Sports Meydan Run	Dubai, United Arab Emirates	
5 km (road)	14:41 Mx (Note: unratificable by World Athletics because no drug test after race)	Beth Potter	3 April 2021	Podium 5k Sub-15.30	Barrowford, England	
10,000 m	30:00.86	Eilish McColgan	4 March 2023	Sound Running TEN	San Juan Capistrano, United States	
10 km (road)	30:19 Wo	Eilish McColgan	22 May 2022	Great Manchester Run	Manchester, England	
10 km (road)	30:07 Mx	Megan Keith	22 February 2026	10K Facsa Castelló	Castellón de la Plana, Spain	
15 km (road)	47:12	Eilish McColgan	16 November 2025	Zevenheuvelenloop	Nijmegen, Netherlands	
15 km (road)	47:12+ Mx	Eilish McColgan	19 February 2022	Ras Al Khaimah Half Marathon	Ras Al Khaimah, United Arab Emirates	
15 km (road)	46:40+ Mx	Eilish McColgan	2 April 2023	Berlin Half Marathon	Berlin, Germany	
10 miles (road)	50:43	Eilish McColgan	17 October 2021	Great South Run	Portsmouth, England	
20 km (road)	1:05:22	Liz McColgan	20 September 1992		Newcastle-South Shields, England	
20 km (road)	1:03:06+ Mx	Eilish McColgan	19 February 2022	Ras Al Khaimah Half Marathon	Ras Al Khaimah, United Arab Emirates	
Half marathon	1:05:43 Mx	Eilish McColgan	2 April 2023	Berlin Half Marathon	Berlin, Germany	
25 km (road)	1:24:01+	Eilish McColgan	27 April 2025	London Marathon	London, England	
30 km (road)	1:41:24+	Eilish McColgan	27 April 2025	London Marathon	London, England	
Marathon	2:24:25	Eilish McColgan	27 April 2025	2025 London Marathon	London, England	
24 hours	247.985 km	Joasia Zakrzewski	18 September 2022	IAU 24 Hour European Championships	Verona, Italy	
48-hour run (road)	411.458 km	Joasia Zakrzewski	12 February 2023	Taipei 24-Hour	Taipei, Taiwan	
100 m hurdles	13.22 (+1.1 m/s)	Heather Paton	31 August 2019	London Inter Club Challenge	Hendon, England	
200 m hurdles	25.84	Eilidh Child	17 May 2014	Great City Games	Manchester, England	
400 m hurdles	54.09	Eilidh Doyle	15 July 2016	Herculis	Fontvieille, Monaco	
3000 m steeplechase	9:18.66	Sarah Tait	9 August 2025	IFAM Meeting	Oordegem, Belgium	
High jump	1.91 m	Jayne Barnetson	7 July 1989	IAC Grand Prix	Edinburgh, Scotland	
Pole vault	4.35 m	Henrietta Paxton	26 June 2010	European Trials and UK Championships	Birmingham, England	
Long jump	6.47 m	Jade Nimmo	14 April 2012	Hilltoppers Relay Meeting	Bowling Green, United States	
Triple jump	13.62 m	Nony Mordi	5 July 2008	UK Women's League	Manchester, England	
Shot put	18.99 m	Meg Ritchie	7 May 1983		Tucson, United States	
Discus throw	67.48 m	Meg Ritchie	26 April 1981		Walnut, United States	
Hammer throw	67.58 m	Shirley Webb	15 July 2005		Loughborough, England	
Javelin throw	57.19 m	Lorna Jackson	9 July 2000		Peterborough, England	
Heptathlon	5803 pts	Jayne Barnetson	20 August 1989		Kyiv, Soviet Union	
Heptathlon	100m H (wind) / High jump / Shot put / 200m (wind) / Long jump (wind) / Javelin / 800m					
20 km walk (road)	1:36:40	Sarah-Jane Cattermole	4 March 2000		Perth, Australia	
4 × 100 m relay	44.56	Scotland; Rebecca Matheson; Alyson Bell; Sarah Malone; Georgina Adam	10 June 2023	AtleticaGeneve	Geneva, Switzerland	
4 × 400 m relay	3:29.18	Scotland; Zoey Clark; Kirsten McAslan; Lynsey Sharp; Eilidh Doyle	14 April 2018	Commonwealth Games	Gold Coast, Australia	

== Indoor ==
=== Men ===
Event	Record	Athlete	Date	Meet	Place	Ref.
60 m	6.56	Adam Thomas	26 February 2022	British Championships	Birmingham, England	
200 m	21.14	Cameron Tindle	28 February 2016		Sheffield, England	
200 m	20.86 A	Adam Clayton	18 February 2022	Jarvis Scott Open	Lubbock, United States	
200 m	20.59 A	Adam Clayton	25 February 2023	Big 12 Championships	Lubbock, United States	
300 m	32.79 A	Brodie Young	24 January 2025	Dr. Martin Luther King Jr. Invitational	Albuquerque, United States	
400 m	45.46 A	Brodie Young	1 March 2025	Mountain West Championships	Albuquerque, United States	
600 m	1:16.48	Guy Learmonth	25 January 2013	Aviva International Match	Glasgow, Scotland	
800 m	1:46.22	Tom McKean	4 March 1990		Glasgow, Scotland	
1000 m	2:16.74	Neil Gourley	15 February 2025	Keely Klassic	Birmingham, England	
1500 m	3:32.48	Neil Gourley	25 February 2023	World Indoor Tour Final	Birmingham, England	
Mile	3:48.87	Josh Kerr	27 February 2022	Boston University Last Chance Meet	Boston, United States	
3000 m	7:30.14+	Josh Kerr	11 February 2024	Millrose Games	New York City, United States	
Two miles	8:00.67	Josh Kerr	11 February 2024	Millrose Games	New York City, United States	
60 m hurdles						
High jump						
Pole vault						
Long jump						
Triple jump						
Shot put						
Heptathlon						
Heptathlon	60m / Long jump / Shot put / High jump / 60m H / Pole vault / 1000m					
3000 m walk						
5000 m walk	20:26.36	Martin Bell	10 March 1989		Glasgow, Scotland	
4 × 400 m relay	3:09.84	Scotland; Jamie Bowie; Greg Louden; Anthony Young; David Martin	25 January 2014	Aviva International Match	Glasgow, Scotland	

=== Women ===
Event	Record	Athlete	Date	Meet	Place	Ref.
60 m	7.27	Alisha Rees	8 January 2023	Be Fit Today Track Academy Indoor Series	London, England	
200 m	23.36	Zoey Clark	22 January 2022	Scottish Championships	Glasgow, Scotland	
300 m	36.89	Nicole Yeargin	21 January 2023	American Track League – Hawkeye Pro Classic	Iowa City, United States	
400 m	51.02	Nicole Yeargin	28 January 2023	Razorback Invitational	Fayetteville, United States	
800 m	1:57.91	Jemma Reekie	1 February 2020	Scottish Championships	Glasgow, Scotland	
1000 m	2:31.93	Laura Muir	18 February 2017	Birmingham Indoor Grand Prix	Birmingham, England	
1500 m	3:59.58	Laura Muir	9 February 2021	Meeting Hauts-de-France Pas-de-Calais	Liévin, France	
Mile	4:17.88	Jemma Reekie	8 February 2020	Millrose Games	New York City, United States	
3000 m	8:26.41	Laura Muir	4 February 2017	Weltklasse in Karlsruhe	Karlsruhe, Germany	
Two miles	9:04.84	Laura Muir	11 February 2024	Millrose Games	New York City, United States	
5000 m	14:49.12	Laura Muir	4 January 2017	Glasgow Miler Meet	Glasgow, Scotland	
60 m hurdles	8.28	Heather Paton	11 January 2020		Loughborough, England	
60 m hurdles	8.28	Heather Paton	26 February 2022	British Championships	Birmingham, England	
High jump	1.93 m	Nikki Manson	8 February 2020		Hustopeče, Czech Republic	
Pole vault	4.31 m	Henrietta Paxton	23 January 2010		Cardiff, Wales	
Long jump	6.43 m	Gillian Cooke	3 February 2008		Cardiff, Wales	
Triple jump	13.45 m	Nony Mordi	18 January 2009		Glasgow, Scotland	
Shot put						
Pentathlon	4177 pts	Alix Still	23 February 2023	Atlantic Coast Conference Championships	Louisville, United States	
Pentathlon	60m H / High jump / Shot put / Long jump / 800m					
3000 m walk						
4 × 200 m relay (National)	1:39.17	Scotland; Donna Brown; Linsey MacDonald; Ruth Girvin; Gillian McIntyre	17 February 1990		Glasgow, Scotland	
4 × 200 m relay (Club)	1:40.40	University of Strathclyde; Rachel Callan; Kelsey Stewart; Emma Barclay; Erin Campbell	26 February 2023		Sheffield, England	
4 × 400 m relay	3:35.27	Scotland; Diane Ramsay; Eilidh Child; Gemma Sharp; Zoey Clark	25 January 2014	Aviva International Match	Glasgow, Scotland	

=== Mixed ===
Event	Record	Athlete	Date	Meet	Place	Ref.
4 × 400 m relay	3:25.67	Scotland; Krishawn Aiken; Rebecca Grieve; Carys McAulay; Kyle Alexander	5 February 2022	Dynamic New Athletics Indoor Match	Glasgow, Scotland	
