= Scottish Women in Sport =

Scottish charity for gender equality

- Formation: 2013
- Headquarters: Glasgow
- Chief Operating Officer: Maureen McGonigle
- Website: https://www.scottishwomeninsport.co.uk/

Scottish Women in Sport (SWiS) is a charity founded in 2013, which advocates for inclusive gender equality in sport in Scotland.

== Aim ==
SWiS promotes equality and parity across all aspects of sport for women and girls, including but not limited to active participation, coaching, leadership, and officiating. They do this by promoting positive role models, sharing good practice, advocating for increased investment and media coverage in women and girls' sport in Scotland.

SWiS has three broad aims:

- Educate
- Participate
- Celebrate

== Launch ==
The charity was launched in 2013 at the Emirates Arena in Glasgow. Speakers at the Launch event included Judy Murray, Alison Walker, Elaine C Smith, Katherine Grainger.

The founding Chief Executive Officer of SWiS is Maureen McGonigle.

== Activity ==
SWiS has run a number of campaigns focusing on different aspects of women's sports, including 'Girls Do Sport' which was a partnership between SWiS and University of the West of Scotland, which promoted 7 sports through a series of short 15-minute programs made by students on media and journalism courses at the University

The charity hosts an annual Awards Ceremony where trophies are given to sportswomen, coaches, teams, and organizations who have excelled in the field of Scottish sport in the past 12 months. They also host an annual conference.

The charity hosts a regular blog on the SWiS website with posts from sportswomen and those active in women's sports in Scotland.

In 2018 it launched the Scottish Women in Sport Hall of Fame, to celebrate past and current pioneers of women and girls sport in Scotland.

== Awards ==
2023 Awards

- Pioneer in Sport: Eilidh Doyle
- Sportswoman of the Year: Beth Potter
- Para Athlete of the Year: Samantha Kinghorn
- Young Sportswoman of the Year: Isla Hedley

2022 Awards

- Pioneer(s) in Sport: Ravenscraig football team
- Sportswoman of the Year: Eilish McColgan
- Para Athlete of the Year: Rosemary Lenton
- Team of the Year: Great Britain curling team (all Scottish)
- Official of the Year: Isla Buchanan
- Volunteer of the Year: Ruth Watson
- Sporting Champion: Pitreavie AAC
- Inspiration in Sport: Jog Scotland

2021 Awards

- Pioneer in Sport: Gillian Lindsay
- Sportswoman of the Year: Kathleen Dawson
- Young Sportswoman of the Year: Katie Johnson
- Team of the Year: Scotland cricket team
- Para Athlete of the Year: Aileen McGlynn
- Coach / Manager of the Year: Catriona Matthew
- Media and Gender Award: Claire Nelson
- Power of Sport: Scottish Sports Futures
- Volunteer in Sport: Sophie Allan
- Sporting Champion: Glasgow Gals
- Inspiration in Sport: Active Life Club

2020 Awards

- Sportswoman of the Year: Laura Muir
- Young Sportswoman of the Year: Toni Shaw
- Most Compassionate Role Model: Megan Clancy
- Inspiration in Sport: Kayleigh Haggo
- Media Category Innovation: Scottish Athletics
- Volunteer of the Year: Moira Taylor
- Excellence in Communication: Louise Renicks
- Community Sport Champion
  - Senior: Saheliya Community Strides
  - Junior: Peebles Golf Club

2019 Awards

- Sportswomen of the Year: Hannah Rankin
- Inspiration in Sport – Cerys McCrindle
- Young Sportswoman of the Year: Megan Keith
- Team of the Year – Scotland hockey team
- Coach of the Year: Andrea Manson
- Official of the Year – Kylie Cockburn
- Community 2019 – Paisley Barbell Club
- Role Model: Leslie Roy
- Innovation in Sport: Jog Scotland
- Champion School: Holy Cross High School

2018 Awards

- Sportswoman of the Year: Seonaid McIntosh
- Young Sportswoman of the Year: Georgia Adderley
- Team of the Year: Scotland football team
- Coach of the Year: Shelley Kerr
- Official of the Year, Anne Malcolm
- Youth Ambassador: Kirsten Barrett
- Role Model: Rosy Ryan
- Community Sport Champion: Anna Beattie
- Inspiration in Sport: Rebecca Sellar

2017 Awards

- Sportswoman of the Year: Sammi Kinghorn
- Young Sportswoman of the Year: Erin Wallace
- Official of the Year: Barbara Morgan
- Role Model of the Year: Jayne Nisbet
- Campaign of the Year: Scotland Sirens
- SWiS Champion: Clare Bath
- Team of the Year: Scotland U-21 netball team
- Coach of the Year: Tina Gordon

2016 Awards

- Sportswoman of the Year: Katie Archibald
- Young Sportswoman of the Year: Maria Lyle
- Newcomer of the Year: Abby Kane
- Best Team Performance: Scotland football team
- Coach of the Year: Karen Ross
- Official of the Year: Sarah Wilson
- People's Champion: Susan McDowall
- Role Model: Samantha Kinghorn

2015 Awards

- Sportswoman of the Year: Danielle Joyce
- Young Sportswoman of the Year: Maria Lyle
- Best Newcomer: Laura Muir
- Best Team Performance: Murrayfield Wanderers Ladies
- Best Role Model: Aminah Din
- Coach of the Year: Jane Gibson
- People's Champion: Liz Taylor
- Official of the Year: Sarah Wilson

2014 Awards

- Sportswoman of the Year: Eilidh Doyle
- Young Sportswoman of the Year:
- Best Team Performance:
- Coach / Manager of the Year:
- Official of the Year: Liz Scott
- Peoples' Champion:
- Best Marketing / Sponsorship:
