= Eilidh Doyle =

British track and field athlete (born 1987)

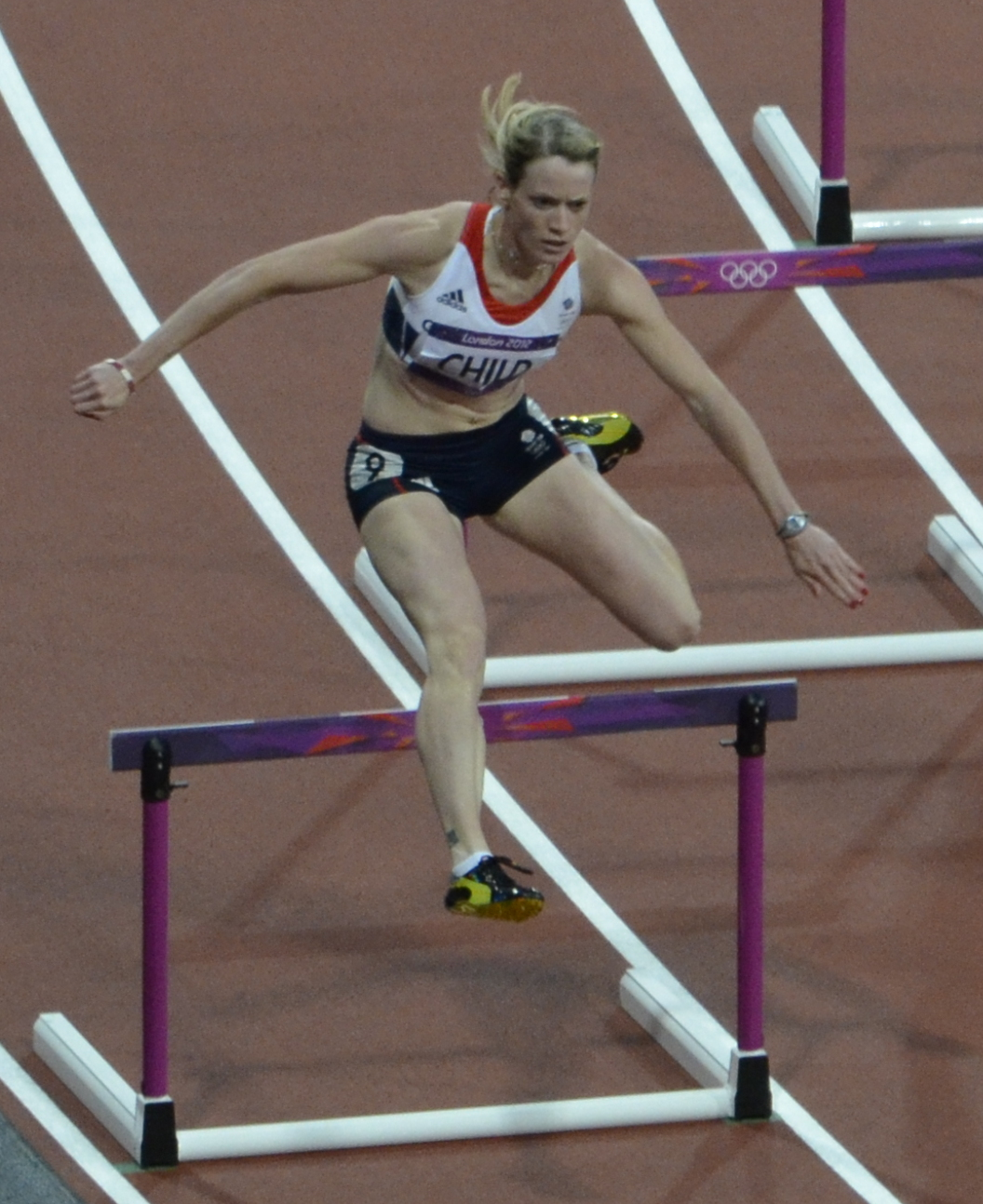
- Doyle competing (as Eilidh Child) at the 2012 Summer Olympics

Personal information
- Full name: Eilidh Child-Doyle
- Born: Eilidh Child; 20 February 1987 (age 39) Perth, Scotland
- Occupations: Hurdler, Runner
- Years active: 2009–2021
- Height: 1.71 m (5 ft 7 in)
- Weight: 59 kg (130 lb)

Sport
- Country: Great Britain; Scotland
- Sport: Women's athletics
- Events: 400 m hurdles, 400 m, 4 × 400 m relay
- Club: Pitreavie AAC

Achievements and titles
- Olympic finals: 2016
- World finals: 2013, 2015, 2017
- Regional finals: 2010, 2014, 2018,
- Commonwealth finals: 2010, 2014, 2018
- Personal bests: Outdoor; 200 m hurdles: 25.84 NR (Manchester 2015); 400 m hurdles: 54.09 NR (Monaco 2016); 4 × 400 m (s): 50.61 (Beijing 2015); Indoor; 200 m: 24.16i (Belgrade 2017); 400 m: 51.45i NR (Gothenburg 2013); 4 × 400 m (s): 51.44i (Glasgow 2019)
Medal record
| Event | 1st | 2nd | 3rd |
|---|---|---|---|
| Olympic Games | 0 | 0 | 1 |
| IAAF World Outdoor / Indoor Championships | 0 | 2 | 3 |
| IAAF Relays / Cont. Cup / Diamond League | 0 | 3 | 1 |
| European Outdoor / Indoor / U23 Champs | 3 | 4 | 2 |
| Commonwealth Games | 0 | 3 | 0 |
| Total | 3 | 12 | 7 |
Representing Great Britain
Olympic Games
| Bronze medal – third place | 2016 Rio de Janeiro | 4 × 400 m relay |
World Championships
| Silver medal – second place | 2013 Moscow | 4 × 400 m |
| Silver medal – second place | 2017 London | 4 × 400 m |
| Bronze medal – third place | 2015 Beijing | 4 × 400 m |
World Indoor Championships
| Bronze medal – third place | 2014 Sopot | 4 × 400 m |
| Bronze medal – third place | 2018 Birmingham | 400 m |
World Relay Championships
| Bronze medal – third place | 2015 Nassau | 4 × 400 m |
Diamond League
| Second place | 2014 | 400 m hurdles |
| Second place | 2016 | 400 m hurdles |
European Championships
| Gold medal – first place | 2014 Zurich | 400 m hurdles |
| Gold medal – first place | 2016 Amsterdam | 4 × 400 m |
| Bronze medal – third place | 2014 Zurich | 4 × 400 m |
| Bronze medal – third place | 2018 Berlin | 4 × 400 m |
European Indoor Championships
| Gold medal – first place | 2013 Gothenburg | 4 × 400 m |
| Silver medal – second place | 2013 Gothenburg | 400 m |
| Silver medal – second place | 2017 Belgrade | 4 × 400 m |
| Silver medal – second place | 2019 Glasgow | 4 × 400 m |
European U23 Championships
| Silver medal – second place | 2009 Kaunas | 400 m hurdles |
Representing Scotland
Commonwealth Games
| Silver medal – second place | 2010 Delhi | 400 m hurdles |
| Silver medal – second place | 2014 Glasgow | 400 m hurdles |
| Silver medal – second place | 2018 Gold Coast | 400 m hurdles |
Representing Europe
Continental Cup
| Silver medal – second place | 2014 Marrakesh | 400 m hurdles |

Eilidh Doyle (pronounced AY-lee /eɪli/; née Child; born 20 February 1987) is a British retired track and field athlete. Originally running as Eilidh Child, she specialised in the 400 metres hurdles outdoors, and the 400 metres flat indoors, as well as competing in the 4 × 400 metres relay on both surfaces. She represented Great Britain at the 2012 Olympic Games in London, and won an Olympic bronze medal in the 4 × 400 metres relay at the 2016 Games in Rio de Janeiro. Individually, she is the 2014 European Champion and a three-time Commonwealth silver medalist (2010, 2014 and 2018) in the 400 metres hurdles.

In a career marked by consistency, longevity and a particular skill in relay running, in which she was twice a European Champion, Doyle is one of the few athletes to have won medals at every senior international championship theoretically available to her. With 17 medals from major championships, Doyle retired as the most decorated Scottish track and field athlete of all time. In addition to her European titles, and Olympic and Commonwealth Games medals, Doyle's honours include three World Championship relay medals (2013, 2015, and 2017), a World Athletics Relays medal in 2015, 2 Diamond League podiums, European Team Championships medals, a Continental Cup medal representing Europe, and individual medals in 400 metres in both World and European Indoor championships.

Doyle reached four global outdoor finals, with a 5th-place finish at the World Championships her strongest placement. As of 31 December 2022, Doyle remained the Scottish record holder for the 400 metres hurdles with 54.09 sec (2016) and the indoor 400 metres with 51.45 sec (2013). Doyle is a seven-time British, four-time Scottish national champion at the time of her retirement.

== Early life ==
Doyle was born Eilidh Child in Perth, Scotland on 20 February 1987. As a youngster, she twice won the U13 Scottish Schools butterfly swimming title. One of her sisters is a writer, the other used to compete at triple jump and her brother is a footballer.

== Sporting career ==
In 2009, Child significantly improved her personal best for the 400 m hurdles from 56.84 to 55.32, to finish second at the European U23 Championships in Kaunas, Lithuania, behind fellow British athlete Perri Shakes-Drayton. She also qualified for that year's World Championships in Berlin, reaching the semi-finals. In 2010, she further improved to 55.16 at the London Diamond League in August. Then in October, she won a silver medal at the Commonwealth Games in Delhi in 55.62.

In 2012, Child ran below 55 seconds for the 400 metres hurdles for the first time, with 54.96 on 2 June in Geneva. Two weeks later, she earned Olympic selection, with 55.53 for second behind Shakes-Drayton at the Olympic trials. At the London Olympics, she reached the semi-finals, running 56.02.

She won two medals at the 2013 European Indoor Championships in Gothenburg, with silver in the 400 metres behind teammate Perri Shakes-Drayton, breaking the Scottish indoor record in the process, with 51.45. She then added a gold in the 4 × 400 m relay. The British quartet of Christine Ohuruogu, Shana Cox, Child, and Shakes-Drayton also improved the UK indoor record to 3:27.56. Outdoors, she broke the Scottish 400 metres hurdles record with 54.22 in Birmingham in June. Then in August, at the World Championships in Moscow, she ran 54.32 in her semi-final to reach the final. In the final she was fifth in 54.86. Alongside Cox, Margaret Adeoye and Ohuruogu, she won a bronze medal in the 4 × 400 metres relay.

Child captained the first ever Scotland team at the Glasgow International match in January 2014. As captain of the GB & NI team at the 2014 World Indoor Championships in Sopot, she won a bronze medal in the 4 × 400 metres relay. 2014 also saw her secure her first 400 metres hurdles British title, and take victory at the first ever IAAF Diamond League meeting in Scotland, the Glasgow Grand Prix. in a European leading time of 54.39.

At the 2014 Commonwealth Games, Child captained the Scottish athletics team to its best medal haul since 1990, winning another silver medal in the 400 m hurdles behind Kaliese Spencer of Jamaica. Two weeks later, at the European Championships in Zurich, she won a gold medal in the 400 m hurdles, running 54.48. She became the first British woman to win the European 400 m hurdles title for 20 years, the previous British winner being Sally Gunnell in 1994.

In May 2016, Child won the 400 metres hurdles at the Doha Diamond League meeting in a time of 54.53 seconds, competing for the first time under her married name, Doyle.

On 15 July 2016, she won the Diamond League meeting in Monaco, setting a new personal best of 54.09 seconds. At the Rio Olympics, she reached the final of the 400 metres hurdles, finishing eighth in 54.61, before going on to win a bronze medal in the 4 × 400 metres relay, the first Scottish Olympic track and field medal since 1988.

In July 2017, it was announced that Doyle had been elected by her team-mates as Captain for the GB Team at the World Championships in London, which included the largest number of Scottish athletes ever selected for a major championships. At the Championships she finished 8th in the final of the 400 m hurdles but would go on to win a silver in the 4 × 400 m relay.

In winning the silver medal, Doyle surpassed Yvonne Murray as the most decorated Scottish athlete in Olympic World, European and Commonwealth competition.

In 2018, Doyle started the season well winning a bronze medal at the World Indoor Championships in Birmingham in a seasons best time, despite tearing her calf in the final. Along with Laura Muir, they were the first Scottish individual medalists at the championships for 25 years.

Chosen by her peers to be the first ever female flag bearer for Scotland (chosen for the opening ceremony) at the Commonwealth Games, she went on to win her third Commonwealth Games silver medal with a time of 54.80 seconds. In August, Doyle made a joint-British record equalling fifth appearance at the European Championships in Berlin

In 2019, Doyle was included in the largest contingent of Scottish athletes to be selected for a British team at a European Indoor Championships for over 50 years.

=== Retirement ===
In August 2019, Doyle announced that she would miss the rest of the season as she was due to have a baby in January 2020, although she planned to return to athletics after the birth.

Doyle announced her retirement in May 2021.

Doyle retired as the most decorated Scottish track and field athlete of all time. She accumulated a total of 17 medals from major championships at Olympic, world, European, and Commonwealth level. If the World Relays and Continental Cup are to be included the medal tally totals 19.

== Personal life ==
In October 2015, Child married former 400 metre runner Brian Doyle and has since competed as Eilidh Doyle.

Doyle has a degree in Physical Education from Edinburgh University and was formerly a full-time PE teacher at Perth Grammar School until she decided to focus further on her training, allowing her to relocate to Bath.

Doyle is a supporter of Hearts FC where she has a season ticket. She wears a maroon and white wristband during all her races in support of the club.

== Career achievements ==
=== National records ===
Records
| Event | Record Type | | Time | Year | Notes |
|---|---|---|---|---|---|
| 400 metres | Scottish | Indoor | 51.45 | 2013 | |
| 400 metres hurdles | Scottish | Outdoor | 54.09 | 2016 | |
| 4 × 400 metres relay | British | Indoor | 3:27.56 | 2013 | (with C Ohuruogu, S Cox and P Drayton) |
| 4 × 400 metres relay | Scottish | Indoor | 3:35.27 | 2014 | (with D Ramsay, Z Clark and G Nicol) |
| 4 × 400 metres relay | Scottish | Outdoor | 3:29.18 | 2018 | (with L Sharp, K McAslan and Z Clark) |

=== Domestic medals record ===
Domestic Championships – Medal Record
| Competition | Event | Position | Years |
Outdoor
| British Championships | 400 m hurdles | 1st | 2014, 2015, 2016, 2017 |
| British Championships | 400 m hurdles | 2nd | 2011, 2012, 2013 |
| British Championships | 400 m hurdles | 3rd | 2007, 2008 |
| Scottish Championships | 400 m hurdles | 1st | 2004, 2007, 2008 |
| Scottish Championships | 400 m hurdles | 2nd | 2006 |
| Scottish Championships | 400 m | 1st | 2011 |
| British Universities' Championships (BUCS) | 400 m hurdles | 1st | 2007, 2008, 2012 |
| British Universities' Championships (BUCS) | 400 m | 1st | 2012 |
| Scottish Universities' Championships (SUS) | 400 m hurdles | 1st | 2006, 2007, 2008 |
| UK Inter-Counties Championships (CAU) | 400 m hurdles | 1st | 2009 |
| England Athletics U-23 Open Championships | 400 m hurdles | 1st | 2007, 2008 |
| England Athletics U-23 Open Championships | 400 m hurdles | 2nd | 2009 |
| Scottish U-23 Championships | 400 m hurdles | 1st | 2007, 2008 |
| AAA U-20 Championships | 400 m hurdles | 1st | 2005 |
| AAA U-20 Championships | 400 m hurdles | 2nd | 2004 |
| Scottish U-20 Championships | 400 m hurdles | 1st | 2005, 2006 |
| AAA U-17 Championships | 300 m hurdles | 1st | 2003 |
Indoor
| British Championships | 400 m | 1st | 2013, 2017, 2018 |
| Scottish Championships | 200 m | 2nd | 2008 |
| Scottish Championships | 200 m | 3rd | 2007 |
| Scottish Championships | 60 m hurdles | 3rd | 2007 |
| Scottish Universities' Championships (SUS) | 200 m | 1st | 2007 |
| Scottish Universities' Championships (SUS) | 200 m | 2nd | 2006 |
| Scottish Universities' Championships (SUS) | 400 m | 1st | 2005 |
| Scottish Universities' Championships (SUS) | 60 m hurdles | 1st | 2005, 2006, 2007 |
| Scottish U-20 Championships | 200 m | 3rd | 2006 |
| Scottish U-20 Championships | 60 m hurdles | 2nd | 2006 |

=== International competitions ===
Representing Great Britain / Scotland / Europe
| Year | Competition | Venue | Pos | Event | Notes |
|---|---|---|---|---|---|
| 2007 | European U23 Championships | Debrecen, Hungary | 5th | 400 m hurdles | 57.11 PB |
| 2009 | European Team Championships | Leiria, Portugal | 4th | 400 m hurdles | 55.48 |
| 2009 | European Team Championships | Leiria, Portugal | 3rd | 4 × 400 m relay | 3:29.29 |
| 2009 | European Team Championships | Leiria, Portugal | 3rd | Team category | 304 pts |
| 2009 | European U23 Championships | Kaunas, Lithuania | 2nd | 400 m hurdles | 55.32 PB |
| 2009 | World Championships | Berlin, Germany | 16th (sf) | 400 m hurdles | 56.21 |
| 2010 | European Team Championships | Bergen, Norway | 2nd | 400 m hurdles | 56.48 |
| 2010 | European Team Championships | Bergen, Norway | 2nd | Team category | 318.5 pts |
| 2010 | European Championships | Barcelona, Spain | 8th | 400 m hurdles | 55.51 |
| 2010 | Commonwealth Games | Delhi, India | 2nd | 400 m hurdles | 55.62 |
| 2010 | Commonwealth Games | Delhi, India | 5th | 4 × 400 m relay | 3:30.91 NR |
| 2010 | Diamond League (Note: The Diamond League winner was determined by the athlete that topped overall points standings after full season is completed.) | Multiple venues | 5th | 400 m hurdles | 55.16 (Note: It was her fastest time of all her Diamond League races for that season.) PB |
| 2011 | World Championships | Daegu, South Korea | 15th (sf) | 400 m hurdles | 55.89 (Note: Selected in the 4 × 400 m relay pool, but did not run in the heats or final.) (Note: Great Britain were later upgraded to bronze medal in 4 × 400 m relay. Doyle did not get a medal because she did not run.) |
| 2012 | European Championships | Helsinki, Finland | 4th | 4 × 400 m relay | 3:26.20 |
| 2012 | Olympic Games | London, United Kingdom | 17th (sf) | 400 m hurdles | 56.03 |
| 2012 | Olympic Games | London, United Kingdom | 5th (Note: Selected to run in the 4 × 400 m relay semi finals, but not in the final.) | 4 × 400 m relay | 3:24.76 SB |
| 2013 | European Indoor Championships | Gothenburg, Sweden | 2nd | 400 m | 51.45 NR |
| 2013 | European Indoor Championships | Gothenburg, Sweden | 1st | 4 × 400 m relay | 3:27.56 NR CR WL |
| 2013 | Penn Relays | Philadelphia, United States | 2nd | 4 × 400 m relay | 3:22.68 (Note: It the third fastest time and a first podium at event.) SB |
| 2013 | European Team Championships | Gateshead, United Kingdom | 1st | 400 m hurdles | 54.42 PB EL |
| 2013 | European Team Championships | Gateshead, United Kingdom | 1st | 4 × 400 m relay | 3:28.60 |
| 2013 | European Team Championships | Gateshead, United Kingdom | 2nd | Team category | 333 pts |
| 2013 | World Championships | Moscow, Russia | 5th | 400 m hurdles | 54.86 |
| 2013 | World Championships | Moscow, Russia | 2nd | 4 × 400 m relay | 3:22:61 SB |
| 2014 | World Indoor Championships | Sopot, Poland | 3rd | 4 × 400 m relay | 3:27.90 |
| 2014 | World Relays | Nassau, Bahamas | 7th | 4 × 400 m relay | 3:28.03 |
| 2014 | European Team Championships | Braunschweig, Germany | 2nd | 400 m hurdles | 55.36 |
| 2014 | European Team Championships | Braunschweig, Germany | 5th | Team category | 285.5 pts |
| 2014 | Commonwealth Games | Glasgow, United Kingdom | 2nd | 400 m hurdles | 55.02 |
| 2014 | European Championships | Zurich, Switzerland | 1st | 400 m hurdles | 54.48 |
| 2014 | European Championships | Zurich, Switzerland | 3rd | 4 × 400 m relay | 3:24.34 SB |
| 2014 | Diamond League | Multiple venues | 2nd | 400 m hurdles | 54.39 (Note: 54.39 was her fastest time of all her Diamond League season races, but her fastest time for points-scoring meetings only was 54.76.) SB |
| 2014 | Continental Cup | Marrakesh, Morocco | 2nd | 400 m hurdles | 54.42 |
| 2014 | Continental Cup | Marrakesh, Morocco | 1st | Team category | 440.5 pts |
| 2015 | World Relays | Nassau, Bahamas | 3rd | 4 × 400 m relay | 3:26.38 SB |
| 2015 | European Team Championships | Cheboksary, Russia | 1st | 400 m hurdles | 54.47 EL |
| 2015 | European Team Championships | Cheboksary, Russia | 6th | 4 × 400 m relay | 3:30.31 |
| 2015 | European Team Championships | Cheboksary, Russia | 5th | Team category | 292 pts |
| 2015 | World Championships | Beijing, China | 6th | 400 m hurdles | 54.78 |
| 2015 | World Championships | Beijing, China | 3rd | 4 × 400 m relay | 3:23.62 SB |
| 2016 | European Championships | Amsterdam, Netherlands | 1st | 4 × 400 m relay | 3:25.05 WL |
| 2016 | Summer Olympics | Rio, Brazil | 8th | 400 m hurdles | 54.61 |
| 2016 | Summer Olympics | Rio, Brazil | 3rd | 4 × 400 m relay | 3:25.88 |
| 2016 | Diamond League | Multiple venues | 2nd | 400 m hurdles | 54.09 NR |
| 2017 | European Indoor Championships | Belgrade, Serbia | 7th (sf) | 400 m | 52.81 |
| 2017 | European Indoor Championships | Belgrade, Serbia | 2nd | 4 × 400 m relay | 3:31.05 |
| 2017 | World Relays | Nassau, Bahamas | 4th | 4 × 400 m relay | 3:28.72 |
| 2017 | European Team Championships | Lille, France | 1st | 400 m hurdles | 54.60 SB |
| 2017 | European Team Championships | Lille, France | 4th | Team category | 270 pts |
| 2017 | World Championships | London, United Kingdom | 8th | 400 m hurdles | 55.71 |
| 2017 | World Championships | London, United Kingdom | 2nd | 4 × 400 m relay | 3:25.00 |
| 2017 | Diamond League | Multiple venues | 2nd | 400 m hurdles | |
| 2017 | Diamond League Final (Note: Finished second in final points standings, but Diamond League had changed to a championship format in 2017.) | Zurich, Switzerland | 4th | 400 m hurdles | 55.04 |
| 2018 | World Indoor Championships | Birmingham, United Kingdom | 3rd | 400 m | 51.60 SB |
| 2018 | European Championships | Berlin, Germany | 8th | 400 m hurdles | 56.23 |
| 2018 | European Championships | Berlin, Germany | 3rd | 4 × 400 m relay | 3:27.40 |
| 2018 | Commonwealth Games | Gold Coast, Australia | 2nd | 400 m hurdles | 54.80 |
| 2018 | Commonwealth Games | Gold Coast, Australia | 6th | 4 × 400 m relay | 3:29.18 NR |
| 2019 | European Indoor Championships | Belgrade, Serbia | 10th (sf) | 400 m | 53.28 |
| 2019 | European Indoor Championships | Belgrade, Serbia | 2nd | 4 × 400 m relay | 3:29.55 |

=== Circuit wins and titles ===
- Diamond League

400 metres hurdles wins, other events specified in parentheses

- 2014: Glasgow Grand Prix

- 2016: Herculis, QAS Grand Prix

=== Awards and nominations ===
| Awards | | Years | Ref |
|---|---|---|---|
| University of Edinburgh | Sports Hall of Fame | 2014 inductee | |
| University of Edinburgh | Cameron Blue of the Year | 2007–08 | |
| SWiS | Hall of Fame | 2023 | |
| SWiS | Sportswoman of the Year | 2014 | |
| Scottish Athletics | Athlete of the Year | 2009, 2010, 2013, 2014 | |
| Scottish Athletics | U23 Athlete of the Year | 2007, 2008, 2009 | |
| Scottish Athletics | U17 Athlete of the Year | 2003 | |
| Scottish Athletics | George Dallas Trophy | 2009 | |
| Daily Record | Young Female Athlete of the Year | 2003 | |
| Dunfermline and West Fife Sports Personality of the Year | | 2007, 2008, 2009, 2010, 2011, 2012 | |
| Perth and Kinross Sports Personality of the Year | | 2012 | |
| Pitreavie AAC | Senior / U20 Athlete of the Year | 2010, 2014 | |
| Pitreavie AAC | Most Outstanding Performanc | 2010, 2014 | |
Other nominations
(EAA) European Female Athlete of the Year (2014); (EAA) European Female Athlete of the Month (July 2014); UKA Olympic Female Athlete of the Year (2014); BAWA Female Athlete of the Year (2014 -3rd); Sunday Mail and SportScotland Sports Personality of the Year (2013, 2014); Scottish Athletics Commonwealth Games Athlete of the Year (2014); Athletics Weekly British Female Athlete of the Year (2013, 2014 - 2nd, 2016); Bath Chronicle Professional Sports Personality of the Year (2013, 2018); Perth and Kinross Sports Personality of the Year (2010, 2014); Perth Guildry Sports Personality of the Year (2007, 2009)
