= 1986 World Junior Championships in Athletics – Women's high jump =

The women's high jump event at the 1986 World Junior Championships in Athletics was held in Athens, Greece, at Olympic Stadium on 17 and 18 July.

== Medalists ==
Gold	Karen Scholz; East Germany
Silver	Alina Astafei; Romania
Bronze	Yelena Obukhova; Soviet Union

== Results ==
=== Final ===
18 July

Rank	Name	Nationality	Result	Notes
1st place, gold medalist(s)	Karen Scholz	East Germany	1.92	
2nd place, silver medalist(s)	Alina Astafei	Romania	1.90	
3rd place, bronze medalist(s)	Yelena Obukhova	Soviet Union	1.88	
4	Jayne Barnetson	United Kingdom	1.86	
5	Niki Bakogianni	Greece	1.83	
6	Gai Kapernick	Australia	1.80	
7	Liu Qian	China	1.80	
8	Leah Cranston	Australia	1.80	
9	Debbie Marti	United Kingdom	1.75	
	Holly Kelly	United States	1.75	
	Amra Temim	Yugoslavia	1.75	
12	Rosanela Gogi	Bulgaria	1.75	

=== Qualifications ===
17 Jul

==== Group A ====
Rank	Name	Nationality	Result	Notes
1	Gai Kapernick	Australia	1.82	Q
	Debbie Marti	United Kingdom	1.82	Q
	Yelena Obukhova	Soviet Union	1.82	Q
4	Amra Temim	Yugoslavia	1.80	q
5	Karen Didonato	United States	1.74	
6	Fernanda Mosquera	Colombia	1.70	
	Athiná Hristodoúlou	Greece	1.70	
	Ayako Isomoto	Japan	1.70	
	Michelle Alleyne	Trinidad and Tobago	1.70	
10	Nicola Springer	Barbados	1.65	
	Maribel Rodríguez	Dominican Republic	1.65	
	Guðbjörg Lilja Svansdóttir	Iceland	1.65	
13	Suzie Tanefo	Cameroon	1.50	

==== Group B ====
Rank	Name	Nationality	Result	Notes
1	Liu Qian	China	1.82	Q
	Jayne Barnetson	United Kingdom	1.82	Q
	Karen Scholz	East Germany	1.82	Q
	Alina Astafei	Romania	1.82	Q
5	Rosanela Gogi	Bulgaria	1.80	q
	Holly Kelly	United States	1.80	q
7	Leah Cranston	Australia	1.78	q
	Niki Bakogianni	Greece	1.78	q
9	Leanne Madill	Canada	1.74	
	Judit Kovács	Hungary	1.74	
	Tracy Phillips	New Zealand	1.74	
	Olga Bolshova	Soviet Union	1.74	
13	Brigitte Pöck	Austria	1.70	

== Participation ==
According to an unofficial count, 26 athletes from 21 countries participated in the event.

- Australia (2)
- Austria (1)
- Barbados (1)
- Bulgaria (1)
- Cameroon (1)
- Canada (1)
- China (1)
- Colombia (1)
- Dominican Republic (1)
- East Germany (1)
- Greece (2)
- Hungary (1)
- Iceland (1)
- Japan (1)
- New Zealand (1)
- Romania (1)
- Soviet Union (2)
- Trinidad and Tobago (1)
- United Kingdom (2)
- United States (2)
- Yugoslavia (1)
