= Diane Ramsay =

Scottish sprinter

Personal information
- Born: 15 February 1993 (age 33)

Sport
- Country: Great Britain; Scotland
- Sport: Women's athletics
- Event(s): 400 metres, 200 metres

Diane Ramsay (born 15 February 1993) is a former Scottish sprinter who specialised in the 200m and 400m. During her athletics career, Ramsay won numerous Scottish Championships and also represented Scotland in international competitions, including relay events at the 2014 Commonwealth Games, and at Glasgow International.

== International career ==
At Glasgow International, Ramsay was part of the quartet that broke the 4 x 400 metres relay Scottish indoor record at the Emirates Arena in 2014. Her teammates included Eilidh Doyle, Gemma Sharp, and Zoey Clark. At the Commonwealth Games that year, Scotland placed fourth in the first round of the 4 x 400 metres relay, and did not progress.

In 2015, Ramsay competed in the 4 x 400 metres relay at Loughborough International, placing second with teammates Zoey Clark, Lynsey Sharp, and Kelsey Stewart.

== Club career ==
Ramsay started competing nationally while still in high school. She initially trained and competed for her local club, Kirkintilloch Olympians, before joining Victoria Park City of Glasgow Athletics Club to become eligible for higher-level competitions. She also competed for Team Glasgow.

== Personal life ==
She attended St Ninian's High School, Kirkintilloch. Four years prior to competing at Glasgow International, she had volunteered as a kit carrier at the same event in 2010. Ramsay graduated with a degree in computer science the University of Strathclyde. After joining JP Morgan as a product manager, she started a running club in 2016 with two of her colleagues, eventually assembling the largest corporate team entered in the Great Scottish Run.

In 2015, Ramsay supported the first-ever festive Reindeer Run in Glasgow to raise money for disabled children. She retired from competition in 2017. As of 2020, she was a Level 3 track official, and joint team manager for a new combined UK league team, together with Anne Scott of Edinburgh.

== Achievements ==
Year	Competition	Venue	Position	Notes
2005	Scottish National Championships	Grangemouth, Falkirk	1st	100m
2005	Scottish National Championships	Grangemouth, Falkirk	1st	200m
2006	Scottish Schools Championships	Grangemouth, Falkirk	1st	100m
2006	Scottish Schools Championships	Grangemouth, Falkirk	2nd	200m
2008	Scottish Closed Championships	Grangemouth, Falkirk	1st	300m
2008	Scottish Schools Championships	Grangemouth, Falkirk	1st	300m
2008	Scottish National Championships	Grangemouth, Falkirk	1st	300m
2009	Scottish Closed Championships	Wishaw	1st	300m
2009	Scottish Schools Indoor Championships	Kelvin Hall, Glasgow	1st	300m
2009	Scottish National Championships	Grangemouth, Falkirk	1st	300m
2009	British AAAs Championships	Bedford, England	4th	300m
2010	Scottish Schools Championships	Grangemouth, Falkirk	1st	100m
2010	Scottish Schools Championships	Grangemouth, Falkirk	1st	200m
2010	Scottish Senior National Championships	Pitreavie, Fife	2nd	400m

Source: "Athlete Profile – Diane Ramsay", Power of 10 – British Athletics.
