= Scottish Women in Sport Hall of Fame =

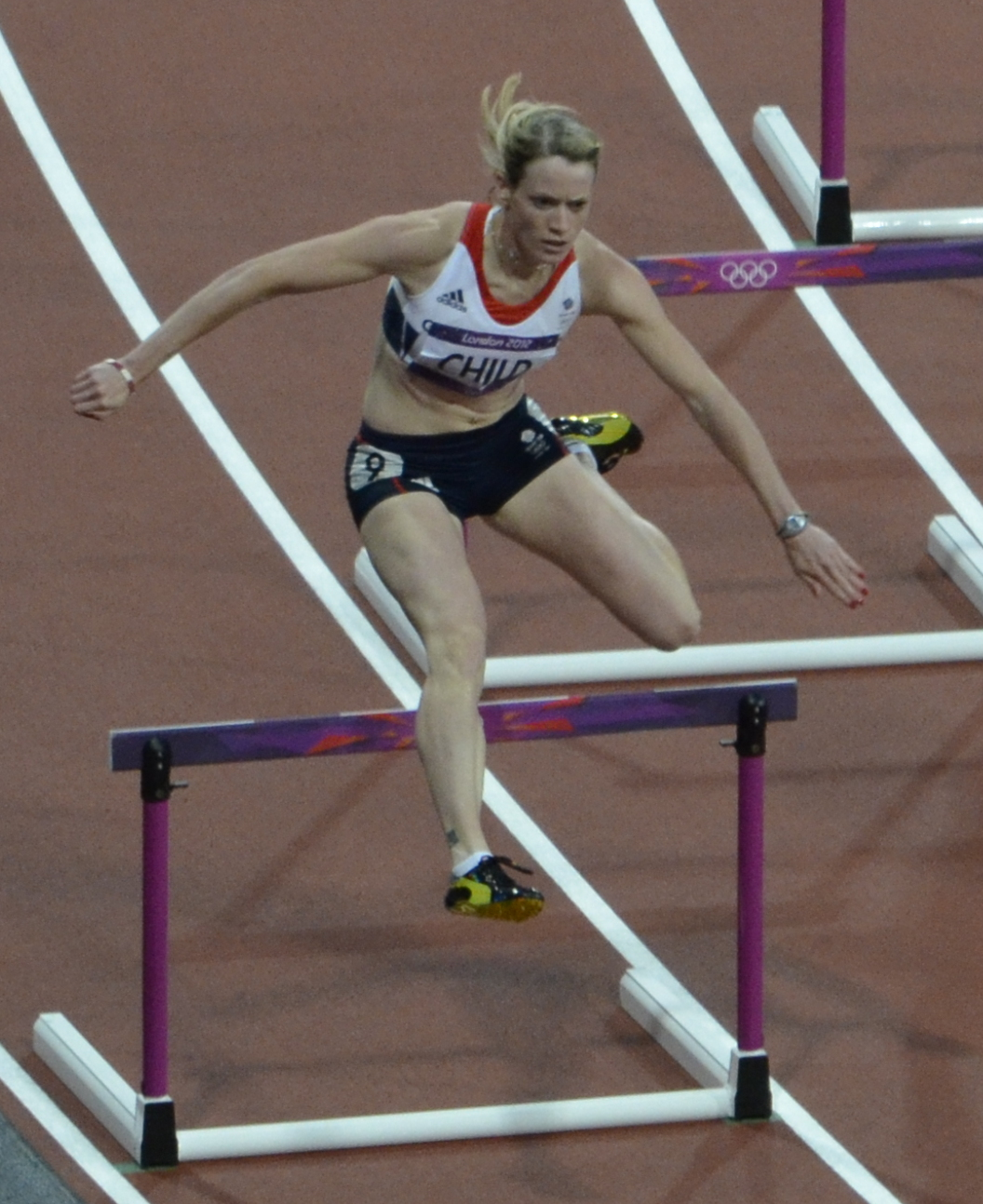
- Eilidh Doyle (2023) is the most recent inductee into the SW/S Hall of Fame.
- Awarded for: Outstanding contribution to Scottish sport by a Scottish female athlete
- Country: Scotland
- Presented by: Scottish Women in Sport (SW/S)
- First award: 2018; 8 years ago
- Last winner: Eilidh Doyle
- Website: www.scottishwomeninsport.co.uk

The Scottish Women in Sport Hall of Fame, launched in 2018, is an award to recognize and honour Scottish female athletes who have made an outstanding contribution to Scottish sport, including women in their day who are considered pioneers in their sport. The women were nominated by the public and national sporting bodies, and chosen by a selected panel of experts to be inducted.

== History ==
Maureen McGonigle, Scottish Women in Sport's chief executive, along with Dr Fiona Skillen, lecturer and sports historian at Glasgow Caledonian University and Hannah Norton of the sport and physical activity department at Strathclyde University were tasked with selecting the final list of inductees for the inaugural Scottish Women in Sport Hall of Fame in 2018. Edna Neillis (football), Helen Graham (football), Isabel Newstead (swimming and shooting), and Marjorie Langmuir (badminton, hockey and tennis) were all confirmed in March 2018 to be inducted.

The first four women were categorized as 'pioneer inductees'. Belle Robertson (golf), Joan Watt (physiotherapy), Kari Carswell (cricket), and Maggie McEleny (swimming) also joined the list as 2018 inductees. The inaugural ceremony took place at the GoGlasgow Hotel in May 2018 and was hosted by world, European and Commonwealth swimming champion Hannah Miley.

As of 2021, the award was incorporated into the annual Sportswoman of the Year awards dinner. Former rower Gillian Lindsay (2021), Ravenscraig women’s football team (2022), and retired athlete Eilidh Doyle (2023) have all since been inducted.

== Hall of Fame ==
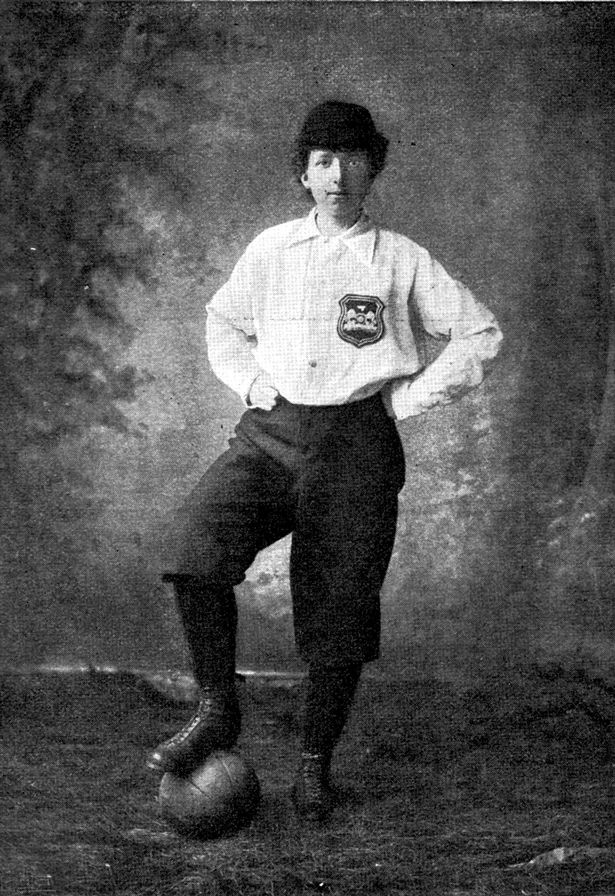
- 2018 Inductee Helen Graham
  Scottish sportswoman in bold were inducted as 'pioneers'.

Year	Athlete	Achievements
2018	**Helen Graham**	Pioneer in the 1880s for women's football.
2018	**Edna Neillis**	Stellar football career. Played in the French and Italian Championships in the 1970s.
2018	**Marjorie Langmuir**	Multi-talented athlete who represented Scotland in badminton, field hockey and tennis in the same year.
2018	**Isabel Newstead**	Multiple gold medal-winning Paralympic and World champion in swimming and shooting.
2018	Belle Robertson	Multiple Ladies Amateur golf champion in match play and stroke play. Multiple Curtis Cup appearances.
2018	Maggie McEleny	14-time Paralympic medalist in swimming.
2018	Kari Carswell	Former player and coach for the Scotland national women's cricket team.
2018	Joan Watt	Forty-five years of service to Commonwealth Games Scotland. Awarded CGF Order of Merit.
2020	Jessie Valentine	Scottish amateur golfer who won the British Ladies Amateur in 1937, 1955 and 1958.
2022	Ravenscraig women’s football team	
2023	Eilidh Doyle	Scotland's most decorated track and field athlete. 17-time major championship medalist.

== See also ==
- List of sports awards honoring women
- Video from Scottish Women in Sport about the 2018 awardees
