= Edna Neillis =

Scottish footballer (1953–2015)

Personal information
- Date of birth: 15 April 1953
- Place of birth: Glasgow, Scotland
- Date of death: 18 July 2015 (aged 62)
- Place of death: Cumbernauld, Scotland
- Position: Forward

Senior career*
Years	Team	Apps	(Gls)
1970-1973	Westthorn United		
1973–1975	Reims		
1975–1977	A.C.F. Milan		
1978–1982	Gorgonzola		
1983	Piacenza		
1984	Gorgonzola		
1985–1989	A.C.F. Foggia		
1989–1990	A.C.F. San Pietro in Lama		

International career
1972–1975	Scotland	5	(4)
- * Club domestic league appearances and goals

Edna Neillis (15 April 1953 – 13 July 2015) was a Scottish women's football forward, who represented the Scottish women's football team and played in the French and Italian championships.

Neillis was born in Glasgow, and raised in the east of the city, playing football in the streets as a child and for Ruchazie boys' team. She went on to play with Westthorn United, a women's team based in Glasgow. She earned her first cap with the Scotland national team as a teenager and played in the team's first international match against England in 1972. Previously, women's football was banned for over 50 years.

Neillis and her teammate Rose Reilly received a lifetime ban by the Scottish FA after speaking out against the national team's amateur-level coach in 1975. She continued to play professionally in Italy.

== Honours ==
A.C.F. Milan

- Serie A title: 1975
- Italian Cup: 1975, 1976

Gorgonzola

- Italian Cup: 1980

Individual

- Inducted into Scottish Women in Sport Hall of Fame in 2018

== In popular culture ==
In 2013, Neillis was featured in the BBC documentary Honeyballers, focused on the pioneers of Scottish women's football. In December 2015, a motion to induct Neillis into the Scottish Football Hall of Fame was proposed.
