= Athletics at the 2010 Commonwealth Games – Women's 400 metres hurdles =

Women's 400 metres hurdles at the Commonwealth Games

The Women's 400 metres hurdles at the 2010 Commonwealth Games as part of the athletics programme was held at the Jawaharlal Nehru Stadium on Saturday 9 October and Sunday 10 October 2010.

== Records ==
World Record	52.34	Yuliya Nosova	RUS	Tula, Russia	8 August 2003
Games Record	53.82	Jana Pittman	AUS	Melbourne, Australia	2006

== Round 1 ==
First 3 in each heat (Q) and 2 best performers (q) advance to the Final.

=== Heat 1 ===
Rank	Lane	Name	Reaction Time	Result	Notes
1	7	Nickiesha Wilson (JAM)	0.310	56.51	Q
2	3	Lauren Boden (AUS)	0.207	56.72	Q
3	6	Carole Kaboud Mebam (CMR)	0.213	56.95	Q, SB
4	4	Maureen Maiyo (KEN)	0.237	59.16	q
5	5	Jauna Murmu (IND)		59.86	

=== Heat 2 ===
Rank	Lane	Name	Reaction Time	Result	Notes
1	6	Muizat Odumosu (NGR)	0.240	55.86	Q
2	7	Eilidh Child (SCO)	0.202	56.16	Q
3	3	Meghan Beesley (ENG)	0.222	56.95	Q
4	4	Florence Wasike (KEN)	0.254	57.04	q
5	5	Ashwini Akkunji (IND)		59.49	
6	8	Christine McMahon (NIR)	0.239	1:01.27	

== Final ==
Rank	Lane	Name	Reaction Time	Result	Notes
1st place, gold medalist(s)	4	Muizat Odumosu (NGR)	0.246	55.28	
2nd place, silver medalist(s)	5	Eilidh Child (SCO)	0.238	55.62	
3rd place, bronze medalist(s)	6	Nickiesha Wilson (JAM)	0.306	56.06	
4	7	Lauren Boden (AUS)	0.210	56.31	
5	9	Carole Kaboud Mebam (CMR)	0.354	57.61	
6	2	Florence Wasike (KEN)	0.254	57.75	
7	8	Meghan Beesley (ENG)	0.258	58.36	
–	3	Maureen Maiyo (KEN)			DSQ
