= Alisha Rees =

Scottish athlete

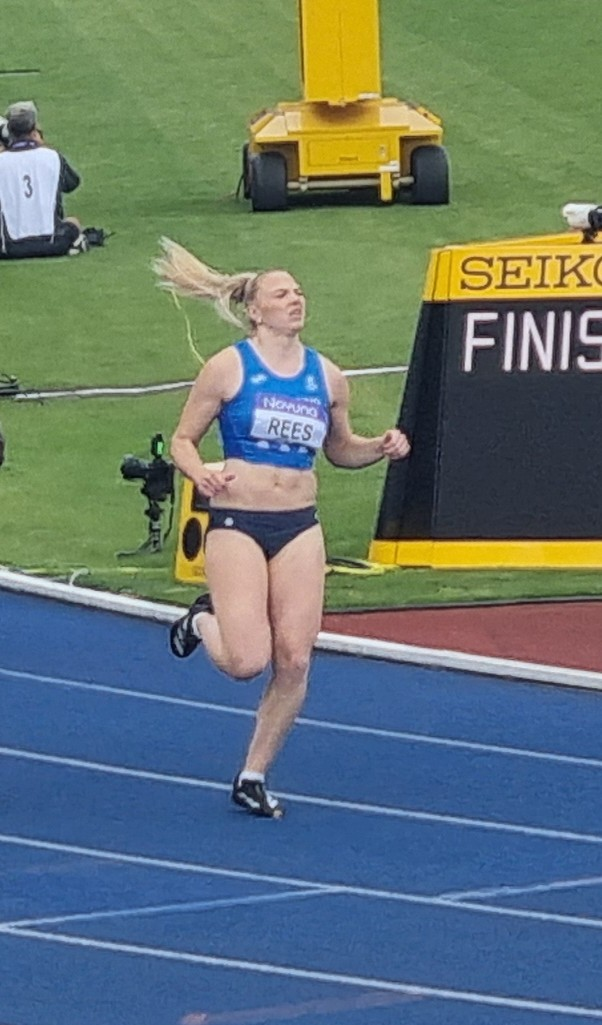
- 2025 UK Athletics Championships

Personal information
- Nationality: British
- Born: 16 April 1999 (age 27)

Sport
- Sport: Athletics
- Events: 60m, 100m

Achievements and titles
- Personal bests: 60m: 7.27 (2023)NRS; 100m: 11.30 (2022) NRS

Alisha Rees (born 16 April 1999) is a British track and field athlete from Scotland who competes as a sprinter. She is the Scottish national record holder over 60m and 100m leading to her been dubbed ‘the fastest Scottish woman in history’.

== Early life ==
Raised in Torphins, a village in Royal Deeside, Rees played football for Deeside Girls as well as competing in athletics, where she trained in Banchory.

== Career ==
=== Junior career ===
Rees was a member of the Scottish team at the Commonwealth Youth Games in 2015 in Samoa. She won silver in the 200m and bronze in the 100m. She also won medals at the European Under-18 Championships, and relay medals at the World and European Under-20 Championships.

=== Senior career ===
Rees earned her first Great Britain selection and won 4x100m bronze at the 2019 European Team Championships held in Bydgoszcz, Poland.

In February 2020 she won the silver medal at the British Indoor Athletics Championships behind Amy Hunt.

==== ‘Fastest woman in Scotland’ ====
In 2022 Rees finished second in the British 60m final, lowering her own Scottish record to 7.31. She would later that year also break the 48 year-old Scottish 100m record of Helen Golden, running 11.39 seconds in Dagenham before lowering again that year to 11.30 in Stratford. After this she was given the monicker “the fastest woman in Scotland” by the media.

Rees captained the a Scottish team at the DNA International in February 2022. In May 2022 she was part of the Scottish 4x100m team that set a new national record time of 44.75 at the Diamond League meeting in Birmingham. Rees made her Commonwealth Games debut in Birmingham in 2022. where she reached the semi-finals of the Women's 100m, and qualified for the final and finished eighth as part of the Women's 4 x 100m Relay team.

In January 2023 Rees lowered her national record in the 60m to 7.27 seconds, racing in Lee Valley. In February 2023 Rees won a bronze medal in the 60m race at the British Indoor Athletics Championships in Birmingham.

==== Injury, illness and return ====
In July 2023, Rees reached the final of the 100 metres at the British Athletics Championships but in terrible weather conditions suffered a bad fall and hamstring injury. That injury and a subsequent auto-immune illness led her to miss the best part of two years before returning to track racing in the spring of 2025. In June 2025, alongside Lucy Fraser, Alyson Bell and Georgina Adam she was part of a Scottish 4 x 100 metres relay team which ran the second fastest time in Scottish history (44.62 seconds) and met the qualifying standard for the 2026 Commonwealth Games.

Rees was named in the Scottish team for the 2026 Commonwealth Games in Glasgow, competing in the women's 4 × 100 m relay.

== International Record ==
Year	Competition	Venue	Position	Event	Notes
Representing Scotland
2022	Commonwealth Games	Birmingham, England	SF 7th	100 m	11.47
2022	Commonwealth Games	Birmingham, England	8th	4 x 100 metres	45.41

== Personal life ==
Rees began a degree in sociology at Loughborough University in 2017. In September 2022 she moved to London to start an MSc in inequality and social science at the London School of Economics.
