= Nicole Yeargin =

Scottish athlete

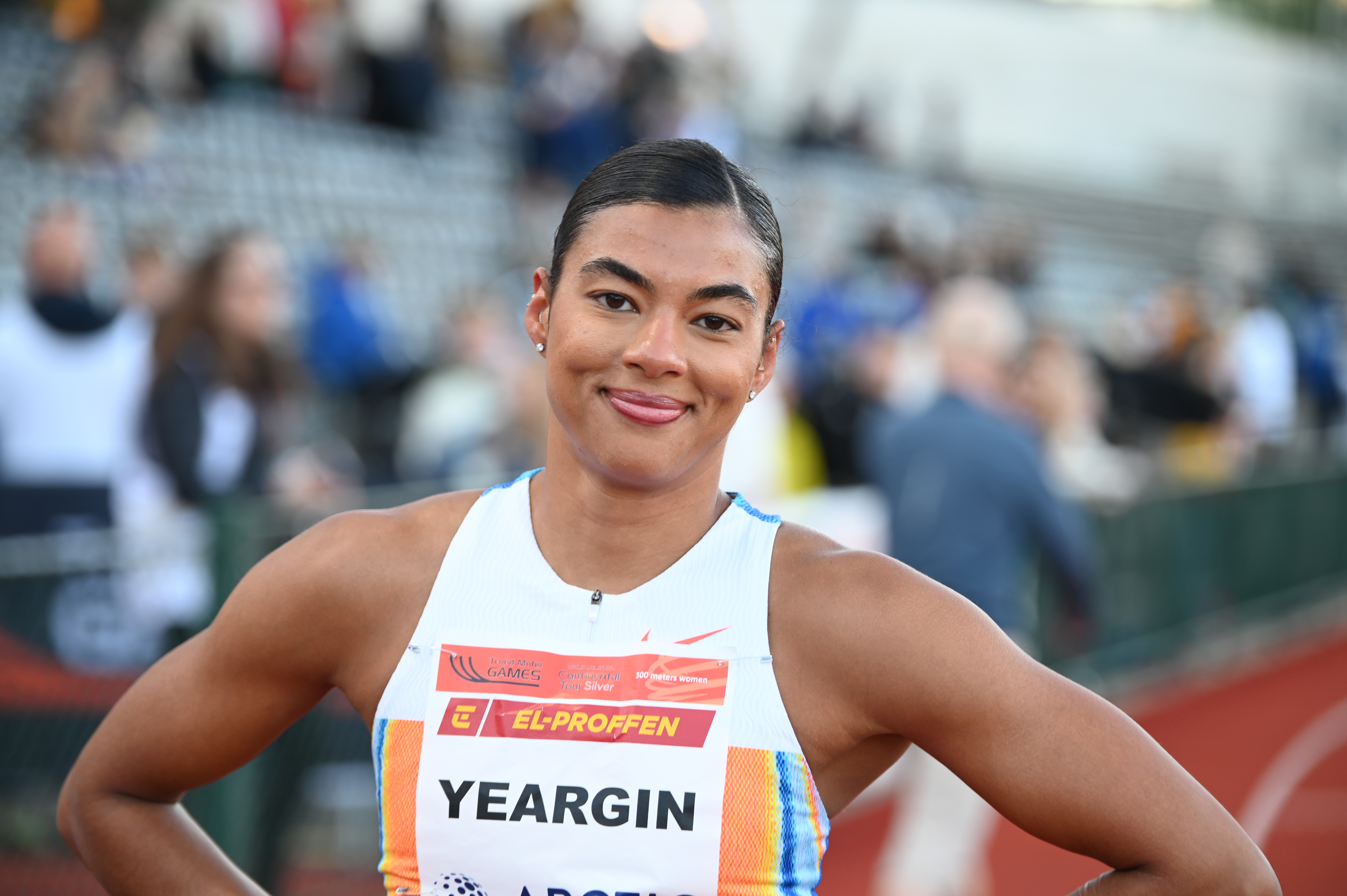
- Yeargin in 2026

Personal information
- Born: 11 August 1997 (age 29) Maryland, U.S.

Sport
- Country: Great Britain & N.I. Scotland
- Sport: Sport of Athletics
- Event: 400 metres
- College team: USC Trojans
- Club: Pitreavie AAC
Medal record
Women's athletics
Representing Great Britain
Olympic Games
Bronze medal – third place	2024 Paris	4 × 400 m relay
Bronze medal – third place	2024 Paris	4 × 400 m mixed
World Championships
Bronze medal – third place	2022 Eugene	4 × 400 m relay
Bronze medal – third place	2023 Budapest	4 × 400 m relay
European Championships
Silver medal – second place	2026 Birmingham	4 × 400 m relay
Bronze medal – third place	2022 Munich	4 × 400 m relay
Representing Scotland
Commonwealth Games
Bronze medal – third place	2022 Birmingham	4 × 400 m relay

Nicole Yeargin (born 11 August 1997) is a British-American athlete representing Great Britain who specialises in the 400 metres. She has won international medals as part of British women's and mixed 4 × 400 m relays at major championships including the Olympic Games, the World Championships and the European Championships. Yeargin is the Scottish indoor record holder for the 400 m and won the bronze medal in the 4 × 400 m relay representing Scotland at the 2022 Commonwealth Games.

== Early and personal life ==
Yeargin was born on 11 August 1997 to an American father and Scottish mother. She studied real estate development at the University of Southern California. Initially focused in high school on gymnastics, football (soccer), and American football, she began running track her senior year at Bishop McNamara High School. In 2019, she recorded personal bests of 23.26 seconds in the 200 metres and 52.76 seconds for the 400 metres. With an upbringing in Maryland, U.S. but with a mother from Dunfermline, Yeargin was cleared to represent Scotland in May 2020. Yeargin stated that her favourite thing about the United Kingdom are sausage rolls.

== Career ==
In May 2021, Yeargin clocked a personal best in the 400 m of 51.39 seconds to put her into second place in the British rankings for the season, and made it a double in terms of Commonwealth Games qualifying times with a 23.18 seconds run in the 200 m, which took her to fifth on the Scottish all-time lists. In June of the same year, she achieved the Olympic qualifying standard in the women's 400 m with a new personal best of 50.96 seconds to reach the NCAA final, which moved her up to third on the Scottish all-time 400 metres list behind Allison Curbishley (50.71) and Lee McConnell (50.82). She also secured a place in the British team for the delayed 2020 Tokyo Olympics at the British Olympic Trials. At the Games, Yeargin was disqualified in the heats of the individual women's 400 m, and placed fifth and sixth with the women's 4 × 400 m relay and mixed 4 × 400 m relay teams respectively.

Yeargin reached the semi-finals of the 400 metres event at the 2022 World Athletics Championships in Eugene, Oregon. At the Munich European Championships a month later, she was part of British 4 × 400 quartet than ran the second fastest time ever by a British women's team of 3:21.74. Her own split time was 49.7 seconds.

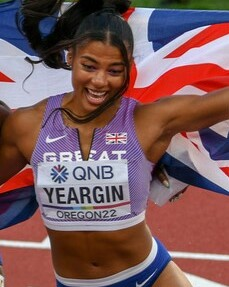
Yeargin at the World Championships in 2022

Competing at the British Athletics Championships in July 2023, in Manchester, she reached the final of the women's 400 m and finished in 6th place. She was chosen to represent Great Britain at the 2023 World Athletics Championships in Budapest in August 2023.

In April 2024, she was selected as part of the British team for the 2024 World Athletics Relays in Nassau, Bahamas. In July, Yeargin was named in the Great Britain 4 × 400 metres relay squad for the 2024 Summer Olympics She was part of the mixed 4 × 400 team which set a new national record of 3:10.61 in the qualifying heat, she did not run in the final but won a bronze medal due to her run in the heats. In the women's 4 × 400 m relay she ran in the final along with Victoria Ohuruogu, Laviai Nielsen and Amber Anning, as they set a new national record of 3:19.72 to win bronze.

She was named in the British team for the 2025 World Athletics Relays in Guangzhou. Competing at the event, she helped the women's 4 × 400 metres team qualify for the upcoming world championships.

On 2 August, she placed fourth in the final of the 400 metres at the 2025 UK Athletics Championships in Birmingham, running 51.75 seconds. She was selected for the British relay pool at the 2025 World Athletics Championships in Tokyo, Japan. She ran on the opening day as the British mixed 4 × 400 metres relay team that finished fifth in the final. She also ran in the women's 4 × 400 metres relay.

On 24 January 2026, Yeargin won the 400 metres ahead of Anna Hall in 52.63 seconds at the Indoor Grand Prix, in Boston.

Yeargin was named in the British squad for the 4 × 400 metres relay at the 2026 World Athletics Relays in Gaborone, Botswana. On the opening day she anchored the British women's 4 × 400 m team as they qualified for the final. Later that day she helped the women's 4 × 400 m relay team also qualify for the final in 3:21.28, the fourth fastest recorded time by a British quartet, before placing fourth overall the following day in the final. In June, she placed fourth in the final of the 400 metres at the 2026 British Championships.

Yeargin was named in the Scottish team for the 2026 Commonwealth Games in Glasgow, placing fifth in the final of the 400 metres and also competed in the mixed 4 × 400 m relay at the Games. Competing for Great Britain at the 2026 European Athletics Championships in Birmingham, she won the silver medal in the women's 4 × 400 metres relay.

== Personal bests ==
- 100 metres – 11.68 (+1.4 m/s, Muncie, IN 2019)
- 200 metres – 23.09 (-0.3 m/s, Fontainebleau 2022)
- 300 metres – 37.15 (Philadelphia, PA 2022)
  - 300 metres indoor – 36.80 (Fayetteville, AR 2023) NB
- 400 metres – 50.96 (Eugene, OR 2021)
  - 400 metres indoor – 51.02 (Fayetteville, AR 2023) (NR Scottish)
