= Linsey MacDonald =

British sprinter

Personal information
- Nationality: British (Scottish)
- Born: 14 February 1964 (age 62) Dunfermline, Scotland
- Height: 160 cm (5 ft 3 in)
- Weight: 43 kg (95 lb)

Sport
- Sport: Athletics
- Event: 400m
- Club: Pitreavie AAC
Medal record
Woman's athletics
Representing Great Britain
Olympic Games
Bronze medal – third place	1980 Moscow	4 x 400 m relay
European Junior Championships
Bronze medal – third place	1981 Utrecht	400 m
Representing Scotland
Commonwealth Games
Bronze medal – third place	1982 Brisbane	4 x 400 m relay

Linsey Tarrel Macdonald (born 14 February 1964) is a former sprinter from Dunfermline, Fife, Scotland, who specialised in the 400 metres and competed at the 1980 Summer Olympics. She was nicknamed "The Fife Flyer" during her career.

== Biography ==
Inspired by competitors like Mary Peters, Macdonald started in athletics at the age of ten. In 1978, Macdonald was a successful schoolgirl runner, where she was Scottish/British School Girl champion in the 100 metres. She moved up to be a successful junior runner winning the AAA indoor 60m championship, she then added the Junior indoor 400m a year later. Her success continued when she won the AAA Junior Championships in the 100m and 400m in 1979, and 100m and 200m in 1980. Also in 1980, she was AAA indoor 200m champion, as well as U.K. Champion in the 400m.

Still only 16 years old, Macdonald, a member of Pitreavie Amateur Athletic Club was selected to represent Great Britain at the 1980 Olympics Games in Moscow. In Moscow, she qualified for the Olympic final, finishing 8th in 52.40 seconds. She was also a member of the 4x400 metre relay team that won the Olympic bronze medal.

In 1981, she won the Scottish and the U.K. 100m and 200m Championships, then won a bronze medal at the European Junior Championships.

MacDonald finished third behind Michelle Scutt in the 400 metres event at the 1982 WAAA Championships and then represented Scotland at the 1982 Commonwealth Games in Brisbane, Australia, where she finished eighth in the 400 final and won a bronze medal with the 4x400m relay team. She went out in the heats of the Athens European Championships in 1982, but finished 5th in the 4x400 relay.

Coached until the age of 18 by Jimmy Brice, she was subsequently coached by John Anderson but never bettered her time of 51.16s at a 16-year-old. In 1985, she won the Scottish 400m metres championship, and the AAA Indoor 400m title.

== Career and personal life ==
Macdonald has degrees in chemical engineering and medicine from the University of Edinburgh and is a general practitioner with a special interest in sport medicine in Hong Kong.
