= Commonwealth Arena and Sir Chris Hoy Velodrome =

Arena in Glasgow, Scotland

Glasgow International Arena and Sir Chris Hoy Velodrome
- Glasgow International Arena
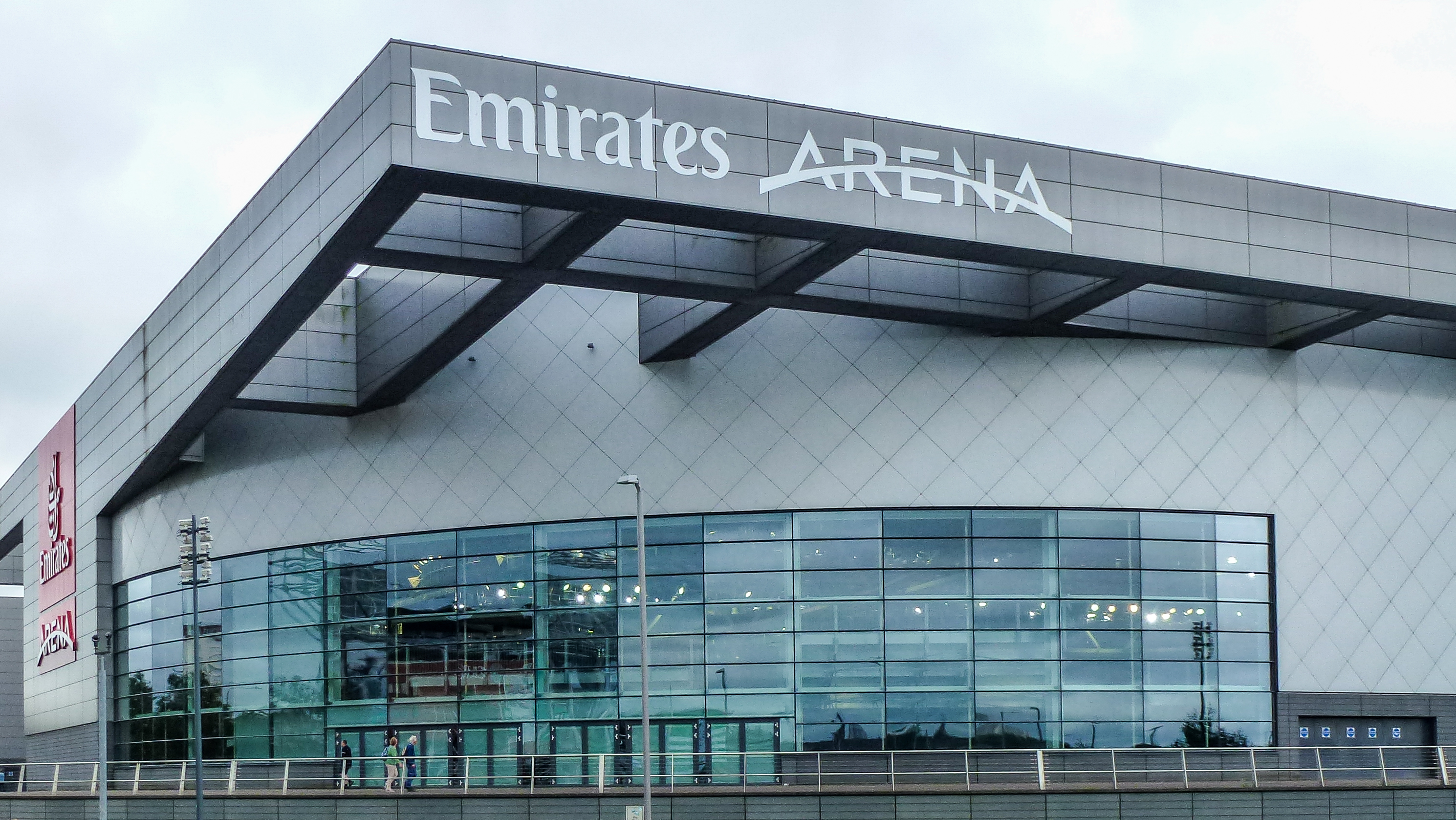
- Glasgow International Arena during the 2018 European Championships
- Interactive map of Glasgow International Arena and Sir Chris Hoy Velodrome
- Former names: National Indoor Sports Arena (NISA)
- Location: Dalmarnock, Glasgow, Scotland
- Coordinates: 55°50′50″N 4°12′28.95″W
- Owner: Glasgow City Council
- Capacity: 8,200 (tennis); 6,500 (basketball); 5,000 (arena); 2,000 (velodrome); 1,650 (sports hall)

Construction
- Groundbreaking: 2009
- Opened: 6 October 2012
- Cost: £113m
- Architects: Sport Concepts, 3D Reid; Ralph Schürmann, Germany (track)
- General contractor: Sir Robert McAlpine

Tenants
- 2014 Commonwealth Games; Glasgow Rocks (2012-2022); Caledonia Gladiators (2022-2023)

The Glasgow International Arena and Sir Chris Hoy Velodrome is an indoor arena and velodrome in Dalmarnock, Glasgow, Scotland. Built for the 2014 Commonwealth Games, these venues hosted the badminton and track cycling events. Situated opposite Celtic Park in the East End of Glasgow, the complex is also the headquarters of Scottish Cycling.

== History ==
It was built on a 12.5-hectare (31-acre) site at a cost of £113 million. The construction work took place between 2009 and 2012. The venue opened in October 2012.

Emirates Airlines won the tender to rename Glasgow's Commonwealth Arena to Emirates Arena in September 2012, shortly before the venue opened to the public in October 2012.

The naming change came after Emirates Airlines signed a 10-year naming rights agreement with Glasgow City Council. At the time, the venue was known as the Commonwealth Arena and Sir Chris Hoy Velodrome, having been built for the 2014 Commonwealth Games. Under the deal, the arena became the Emirates Arena.

The naming rights deal came to an end in 2024 and a 2nd tender process went out to secure another company to name the building. No company bid for the naming rights so it was decided to rename the building Glasgow International Arena and this officially came into place on 1 April 2026.

In September 2017, neighbours Celtic F.C. had plans approved for the construction of a hotel complex within their land, situated directly across the road from the arena and velodrome.

== Indoor arena ==
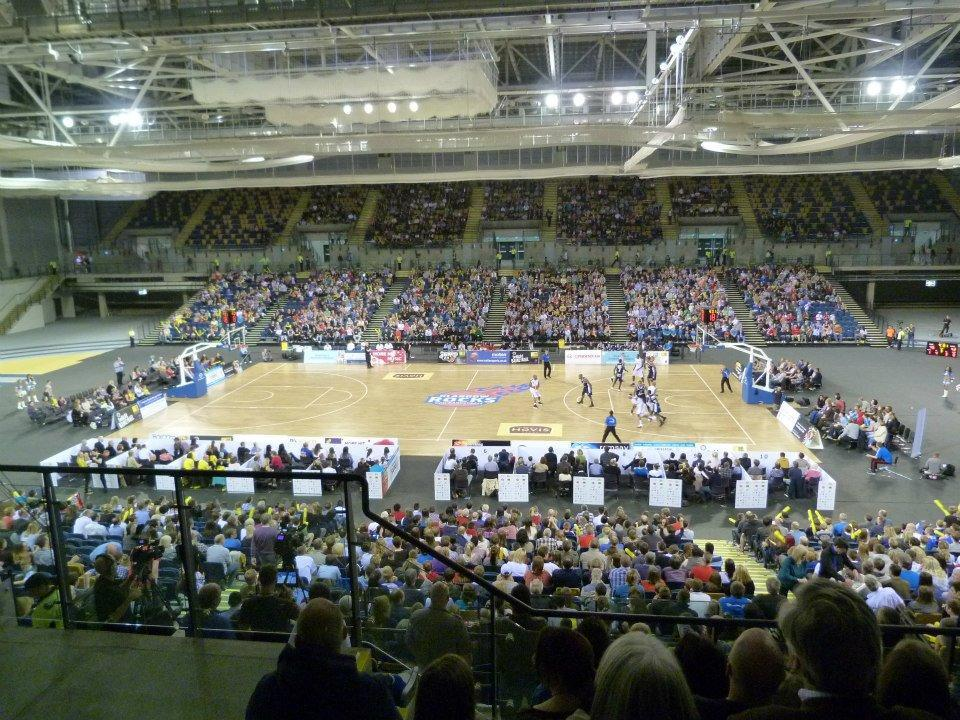
Glasgow Rocks' first home game at the Emirates Arena, October 2012

The Indoor Arena has a capacity of 6,500 and during the Commonwealth Games it had twelve badminton courts in three indoor sports halls. The arena has a hydraulically lifted 200m indoor running track that hosted the Aviva International Match, which will move from Kelvin Hall.

At the start of the 2012–13 British Basketball League season the Glasgow Rocks moved from the Kelvin Hall to the new arena, with their opening game against traditional arch-rivals Newcastle Eagles selling out. With 1,500 extra floor seats around the arena's running track, it became the largest arena of any club in the British Basketball League at the time, and on 8 November 2012 it was announced by the League that the arena would become the venue for the final of the BBL Trophy.

In 2015 the Great Britain Davis Cup team played the United States in the first round and Australia in the semi-final stage at the 2015 Davis Cup, featuring top British player and world number three Andy Murray. The arena capacity was expanded to 8,200 for the semi-final to comply with requirements for the Davis Cup. Great Britain played again at the arena for the 2016 Davis Cup semifinals.

The arena was the main venue for the 2019 European Athletics Indoor Championships and the 2024 World Athletics Indoor Championships.

== Velodrome ==
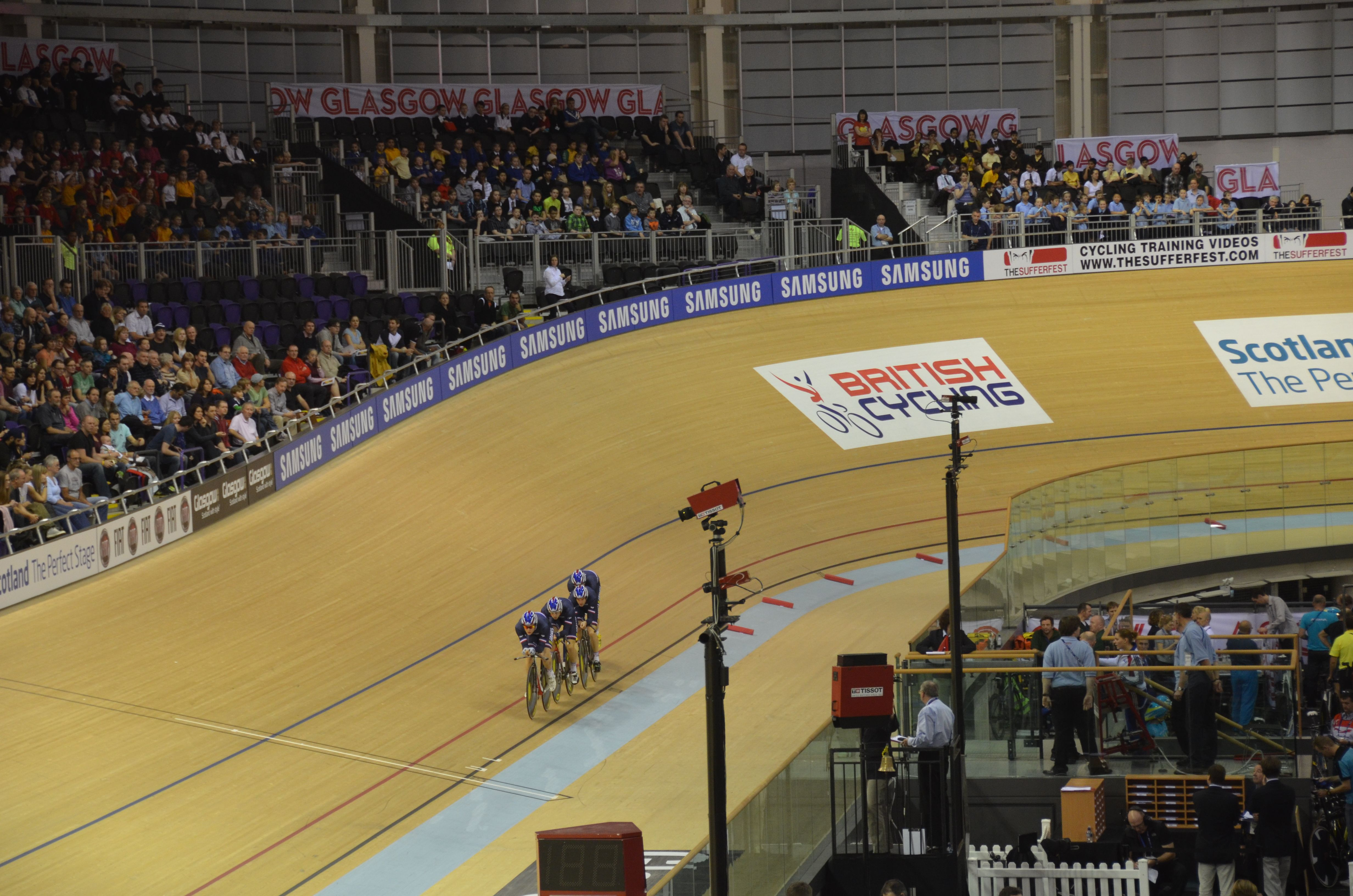
Sir Chris Hoy Velodrome: UCI Track World Cup 2012

The Velodrome has a 250-metre indoor track with a capacity of 2,500 (2,000 seated), expanding to 4,500 (4,000 seated) with temporary seating during the Games. The Velodrome is named after Olympic and Commonwealth gold-medal winning Scottish cyclist Sir Chris Hoy, who was, at the time, Britain's most successful Olympic athlete.

It opened in October 2012, and hosted a round of the 2012–13 UCI Track Cycling World Cup series In August 2013, it hosted the 2013 UCI Juniors Track World Championships. It was the venue for the 2014 Commonwealth Games. The velodrome hosted the European Track Cycling Championships, which was part of the first European Sports Championships.

The arena has parking for 416 cars and 26 disabled bays. There is also a Voi Technology Ebike Parking Location which is one of over 150 Parking Locations across Glasgow.

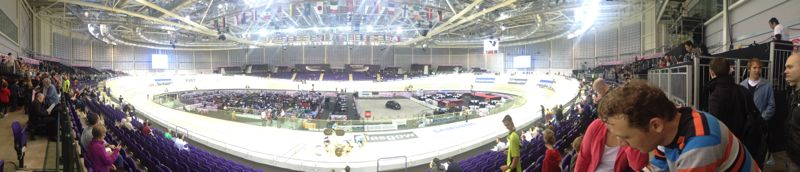
The Sir Chris Hoy Velodrome during the World Cup Cycling Event in November 2012

== See also ==
- List of cycling tracks and velodromes
