= Jayne Barnetson =

British athletics competitor

Personal information
- Nationality: British (Scottish)
- Born: 21 January 1968 (age 57) Scotland

Sport
- Sport: Athletics
- Event: high jump
- Club: Inverness Harriers A.A.C.

Jayne Barnetson (born 21 January 1968) is a Scottish former athlete who competed mainly in the High jump.

== Biography ==
Barnetson finished second behind Diana Davies in the high jump event at the 1985 WAAA Championships.

Barnetson finished fourth at the 1986 World Junior Championships. Her 1989 Scottish records for the high jump (1.91m) and Heptathlon (5803 pts), still stand.

== International competitions ==
Year	Competition	Venue	Position	Notes
Representing Great Britain / Scotland
1985	European Junior Championships	Cottbus, Germany	4th	1.88 m
1986	World Junior Championships	Athens, Greece	4th	1.86 m
1986	Commonwealth Games	Edinburgh, United Kingdom	7th	1.83 m
1989	European Cup	Gateshead, United Kingdom	4th	1.85 m
