= Pitreavie AAC =

British athletics club

- Founded: 1956
- Ground: Pitreavie Athletics Centre
- Location: Queensferry Road, Dunfermline KY11 8PP, Scotland
- Coordinates: 56°03′06″N 3°25′31″W
- Website: official website

Pitreavie Amateur Athletic Club, or Pitreavie AAC for short, is a British athletics club based in Dunfermline, Fife, Scotland. The club makes use of modern and expansive facilities including its own clubhouse and gym as well as access to an outdoor running track and complete indoor facilities at the Pitreavie Indoor Centre run by Fife Sports and Leisure Trust. At Pitreavie AAC, men and women of all ages and abilities compete in a wide range of events, from sprinting to ultra-distance running. The club has teams for all disciplines, as well as highly qualified coaches and excellent facilities.

== History ==
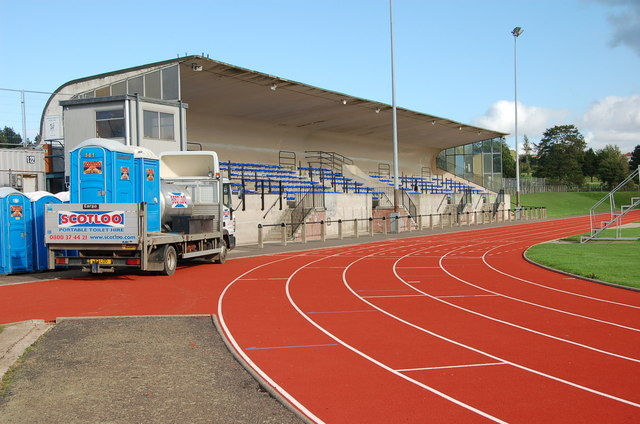
The track in 2006

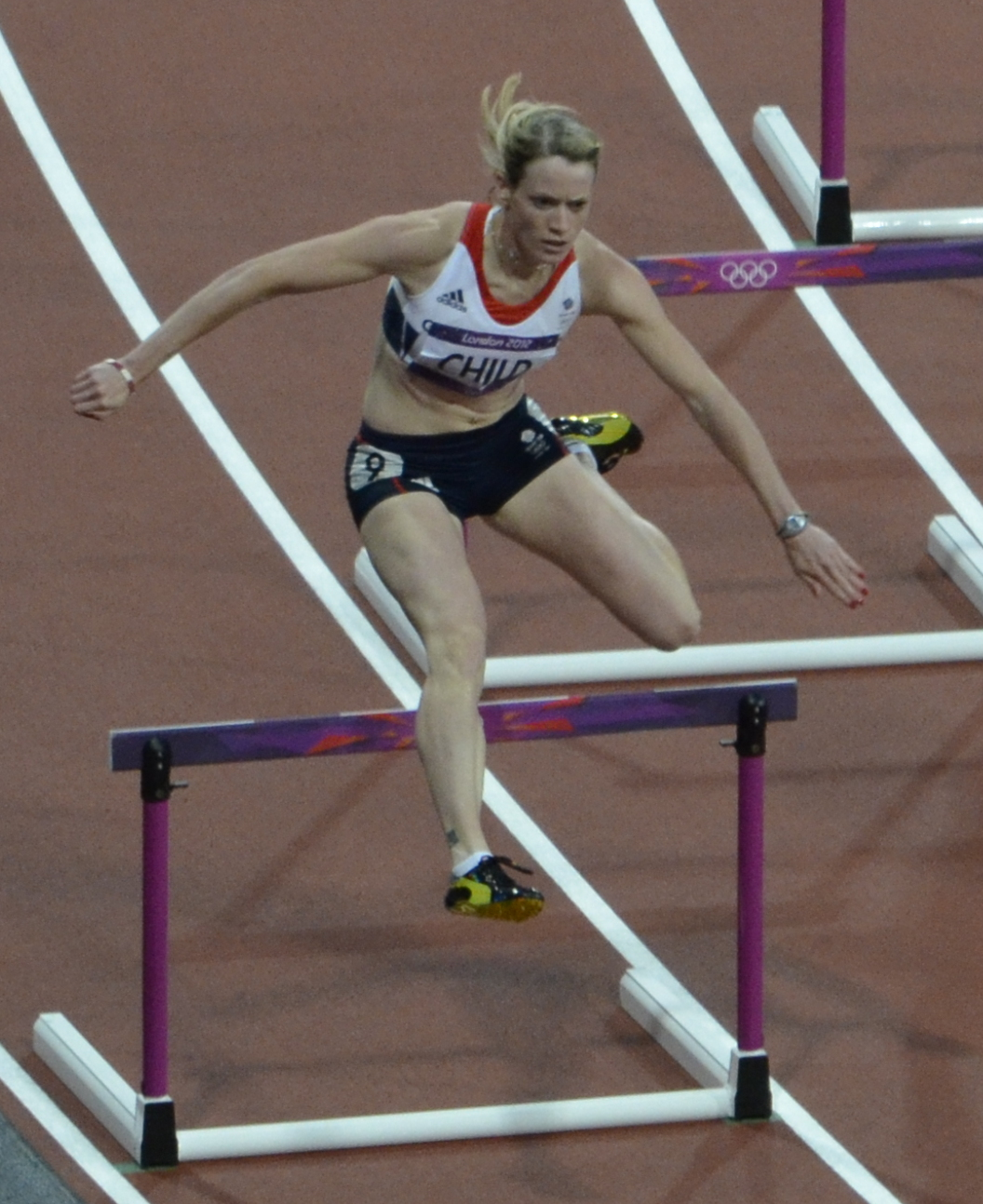
Eilidh Child-Doyle at the 2012 Olympic Games

The club was formed in 1956, the same year that a new £30,000 track had been laid down.

Since 1978 the club has had at least one representative at the Commonwealth Games and has produced several Olympians, including Linsey MacDonald and Eilidh Child-Doyle who both won bronze medals.

== Notable athletes ==
=== Olympians ===
Athlete	Events	Games	Medals/Ref
Linsey MacDonald	400m, 4x400m	1980	Bronze medal
Ian Mackie	100m	1996	
Eilidh Child-Doyle	400m, 4x400m	2012, 2016	Bronze medal
Nicole Yeargin	400m, 4x400m	2020	

=== Commonwealth Games ===
Athlete	Events	Games	Medals/Ref
John Linaker	steeplechase	1966	
Pat Rollo	100m hurdles	1986	

=== Other ===
- Trudi Thomson - (world medalist in ultramarathon)
