= Glasgow International Match =

Annual track and field meeting in Scotland

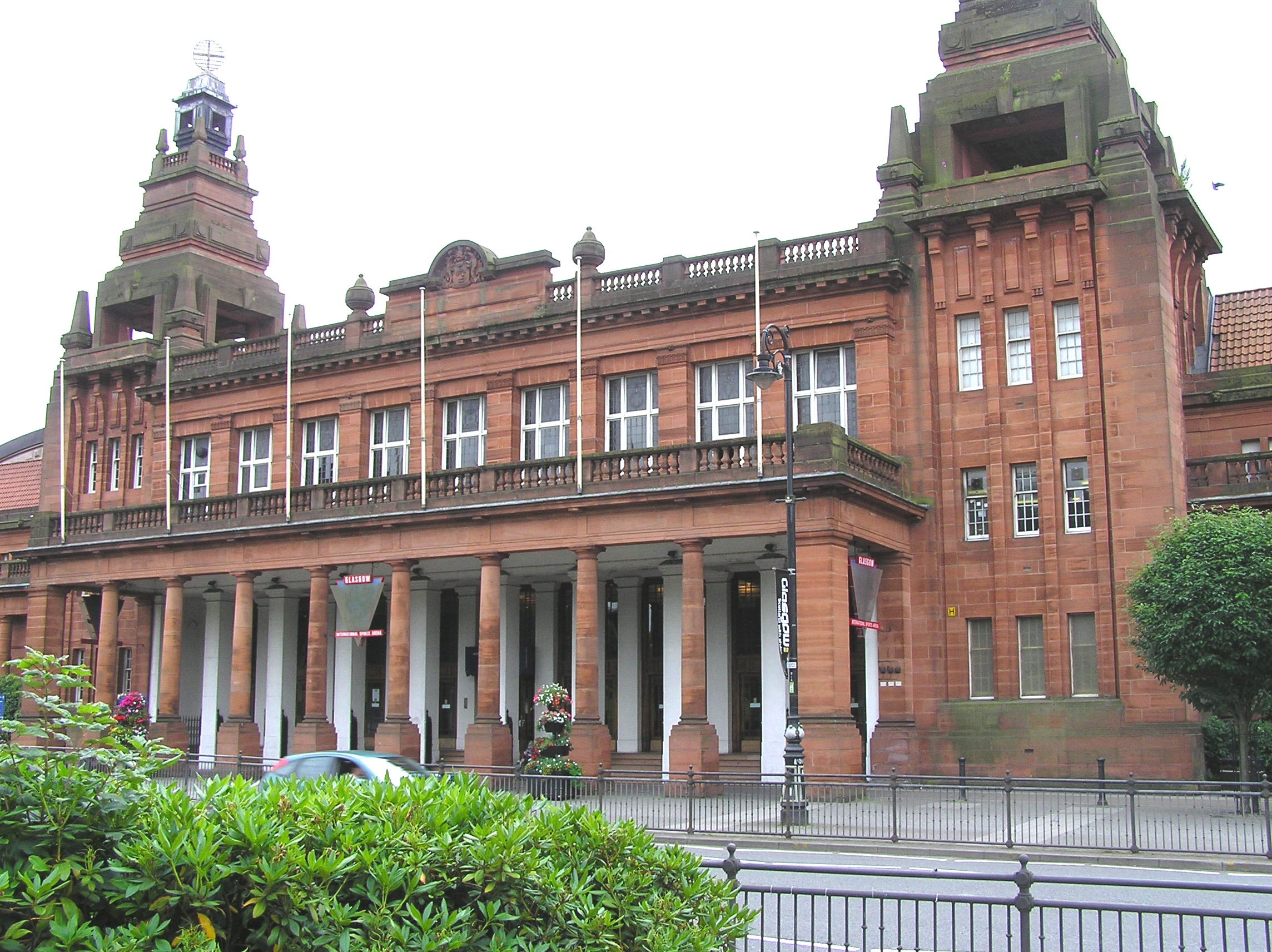
The facade of Kelvin Hall – the meeting's venue from 1988 to 2012.

The Sainsbury's International Match, formerly known as the Aviva International Match, was an annual indoor track and field athletics meeting which takes place in late January in Glasgow, Scotland. The televised competition is the first major indoor event in the United Kingdom's athletics calendar. It was held at the Kelvin Hall International Sports Arena from 1988 to 2012. It moved to the Commonwealth Sports Arena from 2013 onwards.

The International Match was an international team competition, with representatives typically competing for five different squads: Great Britain, a "World" or Commonwealth select team, and three other countries. In each athletic event, athletes score points for their team depending on performance and the team with the greatest number of points at the end of all competitions is declared the winner.

== History ==
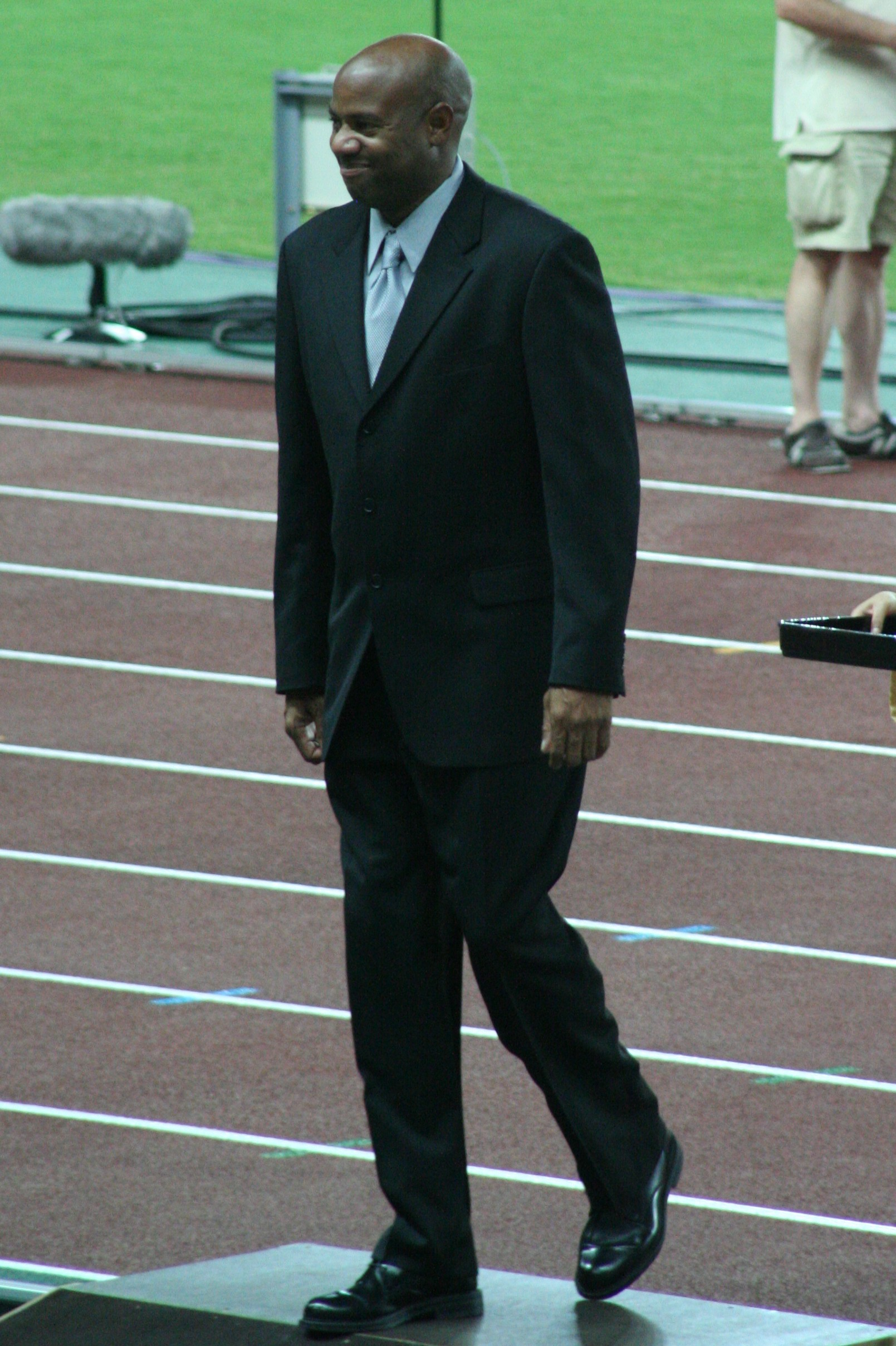
World record holder Mike Powell competed at the meeting in 1993.

The inaugural edition (primarily a contest between French and British athletes) was held in 1988 as the Dairy Crest International and it attracted participants such as Linford Christie and Butch Reynolds. The event was broadcast on ITV and was well received with around 2.75 million viewers in total. The Kelvin Hall became a prominent indoor venue, hosting the 1990 European Athletics Indoor Championships, and the 1990 Dairy Crest Games pitted a British team against a select team from East Germany. After a change of sponsor, the Pearl International Games featured a Great Britain vs Russia competition, as well as high calibre guest athletes including world champions Michael Johnson and Mike Powell. France returned as the rival team to the hosts in the 1995 and 1996 competitions.

The competition was sponsored by Norwich Union from 2000 to 2009. During this time, the international competition developed from a two-team to a multi-team contest: Swedish, Russian and German athletes competed against British athletes in 2002, and by 2004 it had become a five-way team contest (with athletes representing Great Britain, Russia, Sweden, Italy and a World select team). The indoor International Match became a testing ground for young and upcoming British athletes as the country's established international athletes often trained abroad or avoided indoor competition in favour of more prestigious outdoor competitions.

In spite of this, the event continued to attract many of Britain's prominent athletes as well as significant foreign competition; in 2003 the 60 metres featured the then-world record holder Tim Montgomery and Dwain Chambers, with world long jump champion Dwight Phillips and Olympic medallist Bernard Williams also on the programme.

Following the renaming of Norwich Union, the competition became known as the Aviva International Match in 2010. Great Britain won the 2010 competition, highlighted by Jessica Ennis' win in British record-time against reigning 60 metres hurdles world champion Lolo Jones. The 2011 competition saw a five-team competition between Germany, Great Britain, the United States, Sweden and a Commonwealth Select team, which was won by the German team. Helen Clitheroe produced a stadium record in the 3000 m, embarking on a solo run to victory. In the 2013 competition, the United States and Russia tied with 58 points each.

The last edition was in 2015. In 2016 the Birmingham Indoor Grand Prix moved to the Emirates Arena in Glasgow for the very first time, as part of the inaugural IAAF World Indoor Tour.

== Events ==
Aviva International Match events
Men	60 m	200 m	400 m	800 m	1500 m	3000 m	60 m hurdles	Long jump	Triple jump	High jump	Pole vault
Women	60 m	200 m	400 m	800 m	1500 m	3000 m	60 m hurdles	Long jump	Triple jump	High jump	Pole vault

== Meeting records ==
=== Men ===
Men's meeting records of the Glasgow International Match
Event	Record	Athlete	Nationality	Date	Ref.	Video
60 m	6.50	James Dasaolu	Great Britain	25 January 2013		
150 m	15.84	Kim Collins	Saint Kitts and Nevis	25 January 2013		
200 m	20.67	John Regis	United Kingdom	11 February 1995		
400 m	45.33	Danny Everett	United States	8 February 1992		
600 m	1:15.70	Duane Solomon	United States	26 January 2013		
800 m	1:46.22	Tom McKean	United Kingdom	4 March 1990		
1500 m	3:34.94	Abdelaati Iguider	Morocco	20 February 2016		
3000 m	7:39.55	Mo Farah	Great Britain	20 February 2016		
60 m hurdles	7.36	Colin Jackson	United Kingdom	12 February 1994		
High jump	2.37 m	Vyacheslav Voronin	Russia	5 March 2000		
Long jump	8.08 m	Fabrice Lapierre	Australia	20 February 2016		
Triple jump	17.20 m	Christian Olsson	Sweden	27 February 2007		
4 × 400 m relay	3:06.27	Luke Lennon Ford; Richard Buck; Conrad Williams; Nigel Levine	Great Britain	25 January 2013		

=== Women ===
Women's meeting records of the Glasgow International Match
Event	Record	Athlete	Nationality	Date	Ref.
60 m	7.04	Merlene Ottey	Jamaica	8 February 1992	
150 m	17.32	Desiree Henry	Great Britain	25 January 2013	
200 m	22.81	Natalya Pomoshchnikova-Voronova	Russia	30 January 1993	
400 m	50.62	Olga Zaytseva	Russia	28 January 2006	
800 m	1:58.46	Maria Mutola	Mozambique	24 January 2004	
1500 m	4:01.40	Sifan Hassan	Netherlands	20 February 2016	
3000 m	8:42.59	Hellen Obiri	Kenya	28 January 2012	
60 m hurdles	7.74	Ludmila Engquist	Sweden	4 March 1990	
High jump	1.93 m	Alessia Trost	Italy	20 February 2016	
High jump	1.93 m	Levern Spencer	Saint Lucia	20 February 2016	
High jump	1.93 m	Isobel Pooley	Great Britain	20 February 2016	
Pole vault	4.76 m	Svetlana Feofanova	Russia	2 February 2003	
Pole vault	4.76 m	Yelena Isinbayeva	Russia	24 January 2004	
Long jump	6.85 m	Galina Chistyakova	Soviet Union	3 March 1990	
4 × 400 m relay	3:33.49	Meghan Beesley; Kelly Massey; Laura Wake; Victoria Ohuruogu	Great Britain	25 January 2013	
