= 2007 European Cup Super League =

These are the full results of the 2007 European Cup Super League which was held on 23 and 24 June 2007 at the Olympiastadion in Munich, Germany.

== Final standings ==
Men

Pos	Country	Pts
1st place, gold medalist(s)	France	116
2nd place, silver medalist(s)	Germany	116
3rd place, bronze medalist(s)	Poland	110
4	Great Britain	101
5	Russia	93
6	Greece	70
7	Ukraine	58.5
8	Belgium	53.5

Women

Pos	Country	Pts
1st place, gold medalist(s)	Russia	127
2nd place, silver medalist(s)	France	107
3rd place, bronze medalist(s)	Germany	94.5
4	Poland	89
5	Ukraine	81
6	Belarus	80
7	Greece	75
8	Spain	64.5

== Men's results ==
=== 100 metres ===
23 June
Wind: +0.2 m/s

Rank	Name	Nationality	Time	Notes	Points
1	Craig Pickering	Great Britain	10.15		8
2	Martial Mbandjock	France	10.29		7
3	Christian Blum	Germany	10.37		6
4	Dmytro Hlushchenko	Ukraine	10.41		5
5	Dariusz Kuć	Poland	10.44		4
6	Efthimios Steryioulis	Greece	10.46		3
7	Andrey Yepishin	Russia	10.51		2
8	Anthony Ferro	Belgium	10.60		1

=== 200 metres ===
24 June
Wind: +1.0 m/s

Rank	Name	Nationality	Time	Notes	Points
1	Marlon Devonish	Great Britain	20.33	SB	8
2	David Alerte	France	20.34		7
3	Anastasios Gousis	Greece	20.43		6
4	Marcin Jędrusiński	Poland	20.53		5
5	Kristof Beyens	Belgium	20.53		4
6	Alexander Kosenkow	Germany	20.63	SB	3
7	Roman Smirnov	Russia	20.75		2
8	Ihor Bodrov	Ukraine	20.91	SB	1

=== 400 metres ===
23 June

Rank	Name	Nationality	Time	Notes	Points
1	Leslie Djhone	France	45.54		8
2	Tim Benjamin	Great Britain	45.67		7
3	Bastian Swillims	Germany	45.95		6
4	Maksim Dyldin	Russia	46.04		5
5	Daniel Dąbrowski	Poland	46.25		4
6	Kevin Borlée	Belgium	46.46		3
7	Dimitrios Gravalos	Greece	46.83		2
8	Oleksiy Rachkovskyy	Ukraine	47.05		1

=== 800 metres ===
24 June

Rank	Name	Nationality	Time	Notes	Points
1	Paweł Czapiewski	Poland	1:49.00		8
2	Michael Rimmer	Great Britain	1:49.06		7
3	Robin Schembera	Germany	1:49.06		6
4	Dmitry Bogdanov	Russia	1:49.09		5
5	Thomas Matthys	Belgium	1:49.51		4
6	Oleksandr Osmolovych	Ukraine	1:49.52		3
7	Abdesslam Merabet	France	1:49.56		2
8	Efthimios Papadopoulos	Greece	1:52.41		1

=== 1500 metres ===
23 June

Rank	Name	Nationality	Time	Notes	Points
1	Mehdi Baala	France	3:47.36		8
2	Andy Baddeley	Great Britain	3:48.08		7
3	Franek Haschke	Germany	3:48.54		6
4	Mirosław Formela	Poland	3:49.48		5
5	Vasyl Tsikalo	Ukraine	3:49.86		4
6	Sergey Ivanov	Russia	3:49.91		3
7	Joeri Jansen	Belgium	3:50.41		2
8	Konstadinos Nakopoulos	Greece	3:54.28		1

=== 3000 metres ===
24 June

Rank	Name	Nationality	Time	Notes	Points
1	Bouabdellah Tahri	France	7:51.32	SB	8
2	Sergey Ivanov	Russia	8:02.47	SB	7
3	Bartosz Nowicki	Poland	8:02.47		6
4	Nick McCormick	Great Britain	8:02.55	SB	5
5	Willem van Hoof	Belgium	8:08.41		4
6	Adonios Papadonis	Greece	8:13.73	SB	3
7	Mykola Labovskyy	Ukraine	8:32.62	SB	2
8	Carsten Schlangen	Germany	8:33.27	SB	1

=== 5000 metres ===
23 June

Rank	Name	Nationality	Time	Notes	Points
1	Monder Rizki	Belgium	14:15.46		8
2	Arne Gabius	Germany	14:16.09		7
3	Aleksandr Orlov	Russia	14:16.57		6
4	Pierre Joncheray	France	14:17.61		5
5	Oleksandr Sitkovskyy	Ukraine	14:22.36		4
6	Łukasz Parszczyński	Poland	14:27.11		3
7	Frank Tickner	Great Britain	14:29.22	SB	2
8	Anastasios Fraggos	Greece	14:31.25		1

=== 110 metres hurdles ===
24 June
Wind: +0.4 m/s

Rank	Lane	Name	Nationality	Time	Notes	Points
1	2	Ladji Doucouré	France	13.35		8
2	5	Andy Turner	Great Britain	13.48		7
3	1	Thomas Blaschek	Germany	13.51		6
4	4	Igor Peremota	Russia	13.61		5
5	7	Konstadinos Douvalidis	Greece	13.63		4
6	3	Adrien Deghelt	Belgium	13.67		3
7	6	Mariusz Kubaszewski	Poland	13.74	SB	2
8	8	Oleksandr Vakhnyakov	Ukraine	14.21		1

=== 400 metres hurdles ===
23 June

Rank	Name	Nationality	Time	Notes	Points
1	Periklis Iakovakis	Greece	48.35	SB	8
2	Marek Plawgo	Poland	48.90		7
3	Naman Keïta	France	48.90	SB	6
4	Aleksandr Derevyagin	Russia	49.12		5
5	Thomas Goller	Germany	50.48		4
6	Ben Carne	Great Britain	50.74		3
7	Michaël Bultheel	Belgium	50.87		2
	Stanislav Melnykov	Ukraine	DNF		0

=== 3000 metres steeplechase ===
24 June

Rank	Name	Nationality	Time	Notes	Points
1	Filmon Ghirmai	Germany	8:38.78		8
2	Mahiedine Mekhissi-Benabbad	France	8:39.34		7
3	Andrew Lemoncello	Great Britain	8:39.94		6
4	Andrey Farnosov	Russia	8:40.53		5
5	Pieter Desmet	Belgium	8:42.51		4
6	Michał Kaczmarek	Poland	8:44.86		3
7	Vadym Slobodenyuk	Ukraine	8:47.98		2
8	Panagiotis Kokoros	Greece	9:11.66		1

=== 4 × 100 metres relay ===
23 June

Rank	Nation	Athletes	Time	Note	Points
1	Great Britain	Tyrone Edgar, Craig Pickering, Marlon Devonish, Mark Lewis-Francis	38.30		8
2	France	Aimé-Issa Nthépé, David Alerte, Eddy De Lépine, Martial Mbandjock	38.40		7
3	Germany	Christian Blum, Till Helmke, Alexander Kosenkow, Julian Reus	38.56		6
4	Poland	Przemysław Rogowski, Łukasz Chyła, Marcin Jędrusiński, Dariusz Kuć	38.62		5
5	Greece	Efthimios Steryioulis, Hristos Vassou, Anastasios Gousis, Aristotelis Gavelas	39.13		4
6	Russia	Maksim Mokrousov, Ivan Teplykh, Roman Smirnov, Andrey Yepishin	39.37		3
7	Ukraine	Kostyantyn Vasyukov, Dmytro Hlushchenko, Anatoliy Dovgal, Roman Bublyk	39.68		2
8	Belgium	Jean-Marie Louis, Adrien Deghelt, Anthony Ferro, Erik Wijmeersch	39.69		1

=== 4 × 400 metres relay ===
24 June

Rank	Nation	Athletes	Time	Note	Points
1	Poland	Kacper Kozłowski, Marcin Marciniszyn, Piotr Rysiukiewicz, Daniel Dąbrowski	3:01.70		8
2	Germany	Ingo Schultz, Kamghe Gaba, Matthias Bos, Bastian Swillims	3:01.77		7
3	Great Britain	Andrew Steele, Richard Strachan, Martyn Rooney, Daniel Caines	3:01.92		6
4	Greece	Dimitrios Regas, Georgios Doupis, Dimitrios Gravalos, Periklis Iakovakis	3:02.21	NR	5
5	Russia	Denis Alekseyev, Artem Sergeyenkov, Maksim Dyldin, Vladislav Frolov	3:02.60		4
6	France	Numidia Kadri, Brice Panel, Mathieu Lahaye, Teddy Venel	3:03.65		3
7	Belgium	Kevin Borlée, Kristof Beyens, Mathieu Schoeps, Nils Duerinck	3:05.14		2
8	Ukraine	Myhaylo Knysh, Andriy Tverdostup, Vitaliy Holovachyov, Oleksiy Rachkovskyy	3:07.40		1

=== High jump ===
23 June

Rank	Name	Nationality	2.05	2.10	2.15	2.20	2.24	2.27	2.30	2.32	Result	Notes	Points
1	Eike Onnen	Germany	–	o	–	o	xo	xo	xo	xxx	2.30		8
2	Andrey Tereshin	Russia	–	o	o	o	–	xxo	xo	xxx	2.30		7
3	Aleksander Waleriańczyk	Poland	–	xxo	xo	o	o	xxx			2.24		6
4	Mickaël Hanany	France	–	o	xo	xo	xo	xxx			2.24		5
5	Konstadinos Baniotis	Greece	o	o	o	o	xxx				2.20		4
6	Oleksandr Nartov	Ukraine	–	xo	o	o	xxx				2.20		2.5
6	Stijn Stroobants	Belgium	o	o	xo	o	xxx				2.20		2.5
8	Germaine Mason	Great Britain	–	o	xxo	xxx					2.15		1

=== Pole vault ===
24 June

Rank	Name	Nationality	5.10	5.25	5.40	5.50	5.60	5.65	5.70	5.75	5.85	Result	Notes	Points
1	Tim Lobinger	Germany	–	–	o	–	o	–	xo	–	xxx	5.70		8
2	Romain Mesnil	France	–	o	–	xo	–	xxo	xx–	x		5.65		7
3	Denys Yurchenko	Ukraine	–	–	o	xx–	o	–	xx–	x		5.60		6
4	Adam Kolasa	Poland	–	o	o	o	xxx					5.50		5
5	Kevin Rans	Belgium	–	xxo	o	xo	xxx					5.50		4
6	Steven Lewis	Great Britain	–	xxo	xo	xxx						5.40		3
7	Marios Evaggelov	Greece	o	xxo	xxx							5.25		2
	Yevgeniy Lukyanenko	Russia										NM		0

=== Long jump ===
23 June

Rank	Name	Nationality	#1	#2	#3	#4	Result	Notes	Points
1	Louis Tsatoumas	Greece	8.03	x	8.16	x	8.16		8
2	Marcin Starzak	Poland	7.82	x	7.71	x	7.82		7
3	Nils Winter	Germany	7.54	7.70	7.62	x	7.70		6
4	Dmytro Bilotserkivskyy	Ukraine	7.65	6.89	x	7.67	7.67		5
5	Salim Sdiri	France	7.66w	x	x	x	7.66w		4
6	Ruslan Gataullin	Russia	x	7.22	7.44	7.46	7.46		3
7	Chris Kirk	Great Britain	7.14	6.93	7.06	7.42w	7.42w		2
8	Michael Velter	Belgium	7.34	7.21	x	x	7.34		1

=== Triple jump ===
24 June

Rank	Name	Nationality	#1	#2	#3	#4	Result	Notes	Points
1	Aleksandr Petrenko	Russia	16.83	17.29	16.63	x	17.29	SB	8
2	Phillips Idowu	Great Britain	16.83	x	16.96	17.21	17.21		7
3	Mykola Savolaynen	Ukraine	17.09	x	x	16.74	17.09		6
4	Dimitrios Tsiamis	Greece	16.99	16.95	x	x	16.99	SB	5
5	Jacek Kazimierowski	Poland	16.58	x	x	16.85	16.85	PB	4
6	Colomba Fofana	France	x	x	16.81	16.77	16.81	SB	3
7	Andreas Pohle	Germany	16.35	x	15.79	16.36	16.36		2
8	Michael Velter	Belgium	x	x	x	15.79	15.79		1

=== Shot put ===
23 June

Rank	Name	Nationality	#1	#2	#3	#4	Result	Notes	Points
1	Peter Sack	Germany	19.92	20.28	20.00	19.99	20.28		8
2	Carl Myerscough	Great Britain	x	19.66	x	19.96	19.96	SB	7
3	Tomasz Majewski	Poland	19.58	19.93	x	19.80	19.93		6
4	Yves Niaré	France	18.80	19.71	x	x	19.71		5
5	Pavel Sofin	Russia	19.70	19.45	19.55	19.13	19.70		4
6	Wim Blondeel	Belgium	18.07	18.03	18.30	17.83	18.30		3
7	Andreas Anastasopoulos	Greece	17.85	x	18.27	x	18.27		2
8	Viktor Samolyuk	Ukraine	18.08	17.46	18.24	17.75	18.24	SB	1

=== Discus throw ===
24 June

Rank	Name	Nationality	#1	#2	#3	#4	Result	Notes	Points
1	Piotr Małachowski	Poland	64.38	66.09	64.43	x	66.09		8
2	Robert Harting	Germany	62.73	63.19	x	63.90	63.90		7
3	Aleksandr Borichevskiy	Russia	60.77	60.79	x	x	60.79		6
4	Bertrand Vili	France	59.25	58.82	x	58.86	59.25		5
5	Oleksiy Semenov	Ukraine	x	57.08	58.84	59.17	59.17		4
6	Spiridon Arabatzos	Greece	53.81	56.35	x	58.28	58.28		3
7	Emeka Udechuku	Great Britain	56.24	57.59	56.32	x	57.59		2
8	Jo Van Daele	Belgium					45.50		1

=== Hammer throw ===
23 June

Rank	Name	Nationality	#1	#2	#3	#4	Result	Notes	Points
1	Szymon Ziółkowski	Poland	77.48	77.99	76.88	–	77.99		8
2	Markus Esser	Germany	x	57.58	67.73	74.68	74.68		7
3	Alexandros Papadimitriou	Greece	73.83	73.14	x	72.50	73.83		6
4	Igor Vinichenko	Russia	73.54	x	71.68	72.26	73.54		5
	Nicolas Figère	France					~~73.15~~	DQ, doping	0
5	Oleksiy Sokyrsky	Ukraine	69.52	68.86	x	x	69.52		4
6	Andy Frost	Great Britain	59.10	65.90	68.03	x	68.03		3
7	Nicolas Pierre	Belgium	63.29	60.96	57.88	x	63.29		2

=== Javelin throw ===
24 June

Rank	Name	Nationality	#1	#2	#3	#4	Result	Notes	Points
1	Aleksandr Ivanov	Russia	81.27	82.57	80.23	79.54	82.57		8
2	Vitolio Tipotio	France	76.71	79.69	x	x	79.69		7
3	Igor Janik	Poland	x	x	78.70	77.41	78.70		6
4	Oleksandr Tertychny	Ukraine	x	78.03	73.40	70.41	78.03		5
5	Mark Frank	Germany	76.10	x	x	x	76.10		4
6	Nick Nieland	Great Britain	x	73.54	x	75.76	75.76		3
7	Tom Goyvaerts	Belgium	75.39	73.61	74.02	72.00	75.39		2
8	Georgios Iltsios	Greece	72.02	73.57	74.81	72.95	74.81		1

== Women's results ==
=== 100 metres ===
23 June
Wind: +1.1 m/s

Rank	Name	Nationality	Time	Notes	Points
1	Yevgeniya Polyakova	Russia	11.20		8
2	Verena Sailer	Germany	11.35		7
3	Natallia Safronnikava	Belarus	11.36	SB	6
4	Carima Louami	France	11.39		5
5	Iryna Shtanhyeyeva	Ukraine	11.50		4
6	Maria Karastamati	Greece	11.50		3
7	Daria Korczyńska	Poland	11.53		2
8	Glory Alozie	Spain	11.62	SB	1

=== 200 metres ===
24 June
Wind: -2.0 m/s

Rank	Name	Nationality	Time	Notes	Points
1	Muriel Hurtis	France	22.83		8
2	Natalya Rusakova	Russia	22.92		7
3	Iryna Shtanhyeyeva	Ukraine	23.12		6
4	Fani Halkia	Greece	23.30	PB	5
5	Alena Neumiarzhytskaya	Belarus	23.32	SB	4
6	Monika Bejnar	Poland	23.42		3
7	Cathleen Tschirch	Germany	23.60		2
8	Eva Martín	Spain	24.46		1

=== 400 metres ===
23 June

Rank	Name	Nationality	Time	Notes	Points
1	Fani Halkia	Greece	51.85	SB	8
2	Zhanna Kashcheyeva	Russia	51.87		7
3	Yulianna Yushchanka	Belarus	52.09		6
4	Claudia Hoffmann	Germany	52.31		5
5	Zuzanna Radecka	Poland	52.59		4
6	Solen Désert	France	52.60		3
7	Oksana Shcherbak	Ukraine	52.63		2
8	Belén Recio	Spain	54.16		1

=== 800 metres ===
23 June

Rank	Name	Nationality	Time	Notes	Points
1	Sviatlana Usovich	Belarus	2:00.71		8
2	Yuliya Krevsun	Ukraine	2:01.12		7
3	Oksana Zbrozhek	Russia	2:01.14		6
4	Mayte Martínez	Spain	2:01.22		5
5	Élodie Guégan	France	2:01.31		4
6	Monika Gradzki	Germany	2:02.30		3
7	Ewelina Sętowska-Dryk	Poland	2:03.34		2
8	Eleni Filandra	Greece	2:05.02		1

=== 1500 metres ===
24 June

Rank	Name	Nationality	Time	Notes	Points
1	Sylwia Ejdys	Poland	4:17.05		8
	Yuliya Chizhenko	Russia	~~4:17.12~~	DQ, doping	0
2	Maria Martins	France	4:17.23		7
3	Iris Fuentes-Pila	Spain	4:17.75		6
4	Kerstin Werner	Germany	4:17.86	SB	5
5	Nataliya Tobias	Ukraine	4:18.56		4
6	Nastassia Staravoitava	Belarus	4:21.24		3
7	Irini Kokkinariou	Greece	4:26.57		2

=== 3000 metres ===
23 June

Rank	Name	Nationality	Time	Notes	Points
1	Gulnara Galkina-Samitova	Russia	8:47.92	SB	8
2	Lidia Chojecka	Poland	8:54.72		7
3	Dolores Checa	Spain	8:58.35		6
4	Julie Coulaud	France	9:00.03		5
5	Tetyana Holovchenko	Ukraine	9:06.29	SB	4
6	Antje Möldner	Germany	9:08.58	SB	3
7	Konstantina Efedaki	Greece	9:20.56	SB	2
8	Nastassia Staravoitava	Belarus	9:24.09		1

=== 5000 metres ===
24 June

Rank	Name	Nationality	Time	Notes	Points
1	Volha Krautsova	Belarus	15:20.35		8
2	Sabrina Mockenhaupt	Germany	15:23.96		7
3	Kalliopi Astropekaki	Greece	15:46.22	PB	6
4	Liliya Shobukhova	Russia	15:51.53	SB	5
5	Rosa María Morató	Spain	15:59.05	PB	4
6	Christine Bardelle	France	16:29.71		3
7	Yuliya Ruban	Ukraine	17:24.39		2
8	Justyna Bąk	Poland	17:36.87	SB	1

=== 100 metres hurdles ===
24 June
Wind: +0.9 m/s

Rank	Name	Nationality	Time	Notes	Points
1	Yevheniya Snihur	Ukraine	12.92		8
2	Adrianna Lamalle	France	12.94		7
3	Aleksandra Antonova	Russia	12.97		6
4	Annette Funck	Germany	13.14	SB	5
5	Flora Redoumi	Greece	13.15		4
6	Yauhenia Valadzko	Belarus	13.25		3
7	Joanna Kocielnik	Poland	13.35		2
8	Claudia Troppa	Spain	13.77		1

=== 400 metres hurdles ===
23 June

Rank	Name	Nationality	Time	Notes	Points
1	Yuliya Pechonkina	Russia	54.04		8
2	Anna Jesień	Poland	54.88		7
3	Ulrike Urbansky	Germany	55.74		6
4	Dora Jemaa	France	56.27	PB	5
5	Hristina Hantzi-Neag	Greece	56.44		4
6	Laia Forcadell	Spain	57.05		3
7	Krystsina Viadzernikava	Belarus	58.99		2
	Maryna Oprya	Ukraine	DQ		0

=== 3000 metres steeplechase ===
23 June

Rank	Name	Nationality	Time	Notes	Points
1	Katarzyna Kowalska	Poland	9:45.35		8
2	Sophie Duarte	France	9:50.02		7
3	Irini Kokkinariou	Greece	9:53.83		6
4	Valentyna Horpynych	Ukraine	9:55.27		5
5	Yelena Sidorchenkova	Russia	10:03.43		4
6	Zulema Fuentes-Pila	Spain	10:10.80		3
7	Iryna Bakhanouskaia	Belarus	10:13.65		2
8	Verena Dreier	Germany	10:20.20		1

=== 4 × 100 metres relay ===
23 June

Rank	Nation	Athletes	Time	Note	Points
1	Russia	Yuliya Gushchina, Natalya Rusakova, Irina Khabarova, Yevgeniya Polyakova	42.78		8
2	France	Carima Louami, Muriel Hurtis, Nelly Banco, Christine Arron	43.09		7
3	Germany	Katja Tengel, Sina Schielke, Cathleen Tschirch, Verena Sailer	43.33		6
4	Belarus	Nastassia Naumchyk, Natallia Safronnikava, Alena Neumiarzhytskaya, Aksana Drahun	43.41		5
5	Ukraine	Olena Chebanu, Halyna Tonkovyd, Iryna Shtanhyeyeva, Iryna Shepetyuk	43.60		4
6	Poland	Ewelina Klocek, Daria Korczyńska, Dorota Jędrusińska, Monika Bejnar	43.84		3
7	Greece	Eleftheria Kobidou, Yeoryia Kokloni, Hariklia Bouda, Maria Karastamati	44.12		2
8	Spain	Julia España, Silvia Riba, Claudia Troppa, Eva Martín	45.48		1

=== 4 × 400 metres relay ===
24 June

Rank	Nation	Athletes	Time	Note	Points
1	Belarus	Yulianna Yushchanka, Iryna Khliustava, Sviatlana Usovich, Ilona Usovich	3:23.67	NR	8
2	Poland	Zuzanna Radecka, Monika Bejnar, Jolanta Wójcik, Grażyna Prokopek	3:26.36		7
3	France	Phara Anacharsis, Marie-Angélique Lacordelle, Virginie Michanol, Solen Désert	3:28.62		6
4	Ukraine	Nataliya Pyhyda, Oksana Ilyushkina, Kseniya Karandyuk, Oksana Shcherbak	3:28.67		5
5	Germany	Claudia Hoffmann, Korinna Fink, Jonna Tilgner, Ulrike Urbansky	3:29.52		4
6	Greece	Ekaterini Sirou, Dimitra Dova, Hristina Hantzi-Neag, Fani Halkia	3:30.20		3
7	Spain	Belén Recio, Laia Forcadell, Susana Fernández, Eva Martín	3:37.54		2
	Russia	Zhanna Kashcheyeva, Natalya Ivanova, Anastasiya Ovchinnikova, Svetlana Pospelova	3:37.54		0

=== High jump ===
24 June

Rank	Name	Nationality	1.70	1.75	1.80	1.85	1.89	1.92	1.95	1.98	2.00	2.02	2.05	Result	Notes	Points
1	Yelena Slesarenko	Russia	–	–	–	xo	o	xo	o	xxo	o	o	xxx	2.02	=SB	8
2	Ruth Beitia	Spain	–	–	o	o	o	xo	xxo	xo	–	xxx		1.98		7
3	Melanie Skotnik	France	–	–	o	o	o	xo	xxo	xxx				1.95		6
4	Ariane Friedrich	Germany	–	–	–	o	o	o	xxx					1.92		4
4	Adonia Steryiou	Greece	–	o	o	o	o	o	xxx					1.92		4
4	Viktoriya Styopina	Ukraine	–	o	o	o	o	o	xxx					1.92		4
7	Karolina Gronau	Poland	–	o	o	o	o	xxo	xxx					1.92	PB	2
8	Volha Chuprova	Belarus	o	o	xo	xxx								1.80		1

=== Pole vault ===
23 June

Rank	Name	Nationality	3.60	3.90	4.05	4.20	4.30	4.38	4.45	4.65	4.70	Result	Notes	Points
1	Monika Pyrek	Poland	–	–	–	–	–	–	o	o	xxx	4.65		8
2	Nataliya Kushch	Ukraine	–	–	o	o	o	o	xxx			4.38		7
3	Vanessa Boslak	France	–	–	o	–	xxo	o	xxx			4.38		6
4	Afroditi Skafida	Greece	–	o	o	o	xxo	xo	xxx			4.38	SB	5
5	Naroa Agirre	Spain	–	o	o	o	o	xxx				4.30		3.5
5	Carolin Hingst	Germany	–	–	–	o	o	xxx				4.30		3.5
7	Yuliya Golubchikova	Russia	–	–	–	o	xo	xxx				4.30		2
8	Yulia Taratynava	Belarus	o	o	o	xo	xxx					4.20	NR	1

=== Long jump ===
24 June

Rank	Name	Nationality	#1	#2	#3	#4	Result	Notes	Points
1	Eunice Barber	France	6.67	6.69	6.63	6.73	6.73	SB	8
	Tatyana Kotova	Russia	~~6.54~~	~~x~~	~~6.73~~	~~6.65~~	~~6.73~~	DQ, doping	0
2	Concepción Montaner	Spain	x	6.62	6.35	6.72	6.72		7
3	Małgorzata Trybańska	Poland	x	6.61	6.65	6.65	6.65		6
4	Viktoriya Rybalko	Ukraine	x	x	6.50	6.58	6.58		5
5	Hrisopiyi Devetzi	Greece	6.36	6.56	x	6.44	6.56		4
6	Iryna Charnushenka-Stasiuk	Belarus	6.46	x	6.54	6.40	6.54	SB	3
7	Bianca Kappler	Germany	6.14	6.46	6.53	6.30	6.53		2

=== Triple jump ===
23 June

Rank	Name	Nationality	#1	#2	#3	#4	Result	Notes	Points
1	Teresa Nzola Meso Ba	France	x	13.97	14.16	14.69	14.69	NR	8
2	Hrisopiyi Devetzi	Greece	14.58	x	x	x	14.58		7
3	Viktoriya Gurova	Russia	14.31	x	14.11	14.46	14.46	SB	6
4	Olha Saladukha	Ukraine	14.03	14.24	14.18	x	14.24		5
5	Carlota Castrejana	Spain	x	14.03	x	13.83	14.03		4
6	Katja Demut	Germany	13.64	13.93	13.67	13.72	13.93		3
7	Małgorzata Trybańska	Poland	12.96	13.48	13.79	13.55	13.79		2
8	Natallia Safronava	Belarus	12.82	x	13.20	13.47	13.47		1

=== Shot put ===
24 June

Rank	Name	Nationality	#1	#2	#3	#4	Result	Notes	Points
1	Anna Omarova	Russia	18.41	x	19.69	x	19.69	PB	8
2	Petra Lammert	Germany	19.47	x	18.95	x	19.47		7
	Nadzeya Ostapchuk	Belarus	~~18.33~~	~~18.52~~	~~x~~	~~x~~	~~18.52~~	DQ, doping	0
3	Krystyna Zabawska	Poland	x	17.59	17.50	x	17.59		6
4	Laurence Manfredi	France	16.90	x	x	x	16.90		5
5	Irache Quintanal	Spain	x	15.65	16.20	16.27	16.27		4
6	Irini Terzoglou	Greece	15.61	16.24	16.24	x	16.24		3
7	Viktoriya Dehtyar	Ukraine	x	x	15.57	15.13	15.57		2

=== Discus throw ===
23 June

Rank	Name	Nationality	#1	#2	#3	#4	Result	Notes	Points
1	Franka Dietzsch	Germany	58.18	63.60	x	63.04	63.60		8
	Darya Pishchalnikova	Russia	~~60.34~~	~~63.27~~	~~61.32~~	~~59.90~~	~~63.27~~	DQ, doping	0
2	Iryna Yatchenko	Belarus	62.54	x	59.58	60.63	62.54		7
3	Nataliya Semenova	Ukraine	57.42	62.32	60.36	58.26	62.32		6
4	Joanna Wiśniewska	Poland	57.99	x	x	56.73	57.99		5
5	Melina Robert-Michon	France	57.94	x	x	57.65	57.94		4
6	Dorothea Kalpakidou	Greece	51.03	53.46	x	x	53.46		3
7	Irache Quintanal	Spain	x	53.10	52.10	x	53.10		2

=== Hammer throw ===
24 June

Rank	Name	Nationality	#1	#2	#3	#4	Result	Notes	Points
	Tatyana Lysenko	Russia					~~75.86~~	DQ, doping	0
1	Betty Heidler	Germany	71.76	x	x	73.55	73.03		8
2	Aksana Miankova	Belarus	73.03	x	x	x	73.03		7
3	Manuela Montebrun	France	x	62.99	x	68.56	68.56		6
4	Alexandra Papageorgiou	Greece	x	62.99	x	68.56	68.56		5
5	Kamila Skolimowska	Poland	67.58	67.71	x	x	67.71		4
6	Berta Castells	Spain	63.43	66.21	x	x	66.21		3
7	Iryna Sekachyova	Ukraine	65.25	x	62.77	x	65.25		2

=== Javelin throw ===
23 June

Rank	Name	Nationality	#1	#2	#3	#4	Result	Notes	Points
1	Christina Obergföll	Germany	64.16	70.20	65.77	62.80	70.20	CR, AR	8
2	Oksana Gromova	Russia	60.15	60.01	x	59.93	60.15		7
3	Barbara Madejczyk	Poland	55.28	59.36	x	x	59.36		6
4	Mercedes Chilla	Spain	53.63	58.86	58.51	x	58.86		5
5	Tetyana Lyakhovych	Ukraine	50.30	55.65	x	52.23	55.65		4
6	Savva Lika	Greece	55.19	54.85	55.37	x	55.37		3
7	Natallia Shymchuk	Belarus	51.34	53.18	x	x	53.18		2
8	Sephora Bissoly	France	x	52.06	46.64	49.89	52.06		1
