= 2008 European Cup Super League =

These are the full results of the 2008 European Cup Super League which was held on 21 and 22 June 2008 at the Parc des Sports in Annecy, France.

== Final standings ==
Men

Pos	Country	Pts
1	Great Britain	112
2	Poland	98
3	France	96
4	Germany	95
5	Russia	84
6	Italy	82
7	Spain	81
8	Greece	68

Women

Pos	Country	Pts
1	Russia	122
2	Ukraine	108.5
3	Great Britain	89
4	Poland	86
5	France	81
6	Italy	79.5
7	Belarus	78
8	Germany	74

== Men's results ==
=== 100 metres ===
June 21
Wind: -1.8 m/s

Rank	Name	Nationality	Time	Notes	Points
1	Tyrone Edgar	Great Britain	10.20		8
2	Martial Mbandjock	France	10.25		7
3	Tobias Unger	Germany	10.37		6
4	Ángel David Rodríguez	Spain	10.38		5
5	Simone Collio	Italy	10.45		4
6	Łukasz Chyła	Poland	10.50		3
7	Panagiotis Sarris	Greece	10.58		2
8	Roman Smirnov	Russia	10.61		1

=== 200 metres ===
June 22
Wind: -0.3 m/s

Rank	Name	Nationality	Time	Notes	Points
1	Marlon Devonish	Great Britain	20.52		8
2	Anastasios Gousis	Greece	20.57	SB	7
3	Alexander Kosenkow	Germany	20.61		6
4	Roman Smirnov	Russia	20.72		5
5	Ángel David Rodríguez	Spain	20.74		4
6	Marcin Jędrusiński	Poland	20.81		3
7	Eddy De Lépine	France	20.85		2
8	Andrew Howe	Italy	20.88	SB	1

=== 400 metres ===
June 21

Rank	Name	Nationality	Time	Notes	Points
1	Martyn Rooney	Great Britain	45.33		8
2	Claudio Licciardello	Italy	45.57		7
3	Denis Alekseyev	Russia	45.67		6
4	Leslie Djhone	France	45.78		5
5	Piotr Kędzia	Poland	46.04		4
6	Kamghe Gaba	Germany	46.43		3
7	Padelis Melahrinoudis	Greece	46.54		2
8	Mark Ujakpor	Spain	46.94		1

=== 800 metres ===
June 22

Rank	Name	Nationality	Time	Notes	Points
1	Manuel Olmedo	Spain	1:49.98		8
2	Marcin Lewandowski	Poland	1:50.13		7
3	Yuriy Koldin	Russia	1:50.17		6
4	Robin Schembera	Germany	1:50.23		5
5	Lukas Rifesser	Italy	1:50.65		4
6	Richard Hill	Great Britain	1:50.65		3
7	Ismaël Koné	France	1:50.68		2
8	Efthimios Papadopoulos	Greece	1:51.34		1

=== 1500 metres ===
June 21

Rank	Name	Nationality	Time	Notes	Points
1	Mehdi Baala	France	3:40.55		8
2	Arturo Casado	Spain	3:40.70		7
3	Carsten Schlangen	Germany	3:41.75		6
4	Tom Lancashire	Great Britain	3:42.11		5
5	Bartosz Nowicki	Poland	3:43.00		4
6	Aleksey Popov	Russia	3:44.57		3
7	Christian Obrist	Italy	3:47.13		2
8	Panayiotis Ikonomou	Greece	3:52.22		1

=== 3000 metres ===
June 22

Rank	Name	Nationality	Time	Notes	Points
1	Andy Baddeley	Great Britain	8:01.28	SB	8
2	Jesús España	Spain	8:01.62		7
3	Sergey Ivanov	Russia	8:01.91	SB	6
4	Bouabdellah Tahri	France	8:02.21		5
5	Łukasz Parszczyński	Poland	8:05.75		4
6	Stefano La Rosa	Italy	8:06.04		3
7	Wolfram Müller	Germany	8:06.25	SB	2
8	Anastasios Fraggos	Greece	8:21.67	SB	1

=== 5000 metres ===
June 21

Rank	Name	Nationality	Time	Notes	Points
1	Mohamed Farah	Great Britain	13:44.07		8
2	Carles Castillejo	Spain	13:57.37		7
3	Daniele Meucci	Italy	14:03.04		6
4	Zelalem Martel	Germany	14:12.14		5
5	Adonios Papadonis	Greece	14:13.16		4
6	Marcin Chabowski	Poland	14:17.45	SB	3
7	Hassan Hirt	France	14:19.81		2
8	Stepan Kiselev	Russia	14:25.77		1

=== 110 metres hurdles ===
June 22
Wind: -0.6 m/s

Rank	Name	Nationality	Time	Notes	Points
1	Jackson Quiñónez	Spain	13.40	SB	8
2	Konstadinos Douvalidis	Greece	13.59		7
3	Yevgeniy Borisov	Russia	13.66		6
4	Allan Scott	Great Britain	13.70		5
5	Samuel Coco-Viloin	France	13.76		4
6	Dominik Bochenek	Poland	13.86		3
7	Thomas Blaschek	Germany	13.87		2
8	Emanuele Abate	Italy	14.17		1

=== 400 metres hurdles ===
June 21

Rank	Name	Nationality	Time	Notes	Points
1	Periklis Iakovakis	Greece	49.15		8
2	Marek Plawgo	Poland	49.44		7
3	Salah Ghaidi	France	49.64		6
4	Aleksandr Derevyagin	Russia	49.80		5
5	Dale Garland	Great Britain	50.65		4
6	Nicola Cascella	Italy	50.81	SB	3
7	Stephan Stoll	Germany	51.39		2
8	Diego Cabello	Spain	51.75		1

=== 3000 metres steeplechase ===
June 22

Rank	Name	Nationality	Time	Notes	Points
1	Mahiedine Mekhissi-Benabbad	France	8:33.10		8
2	Ildar Minshin	Russia	8:34.89		7
3	Andrew Lemoncello	Great Britain	8:36.33		6
4	Matteo Villani	Italy	8:36.76		5
5	Tomasz Szymkowiak	Poland	8:37.30		4
6	Filmon Ghirmai	Germany	8:50.95		3
7	José Luis Blanco	Spain	8:53.05		2
8	Alexandros Litsis	Greece	9:19.91		1

=== 4 × 100 metres relay ===
June 21

Rank	Nation	Athletes	Time	Note	Points
1	Great Britain	Christian Malcolm, Tyrone Edgar, Marlon Devonish, Rikki Fifton	38.48		8
2	Poland	Dariusz Kuć, Łukasz Chyła, Kamil Masztak, Marcin Jędrusiński	38.61		7
3	Italy	Emanuele Di Gregorio, Simone Collio, Massimiliano Donati, Maurizio Checcucci	38.73		6
4	France	Yvon Rodrigue Sialo-Ngboda, Ronald Pognon, Eddy De Lépine, Martial Mbandjock	38.78		5
5	Russia	Igor Gostev, Ivan Teplykh, Roman Smirnov, Mikhail Idrisov	39.40		4
6	Spain	Cecilio Maestra, Ángel David Rodríguez, Álvaro Aljarilla, José López	40.17		3
7	Greece	Emmanouil Koutsouklakis, Ioannis Apostolou, Anastasios Gousis, Panagiotis Sarris	40.38		2
	Germany	Tobias Unger, Till Helmke, Alexander Kosenkow, Martin Keller	DQ		0

=== 4 × 400 metres relay ===
June 22

Rank	Nation	Athletes	Time	Note	Points
1	France	Leslie Djhone, Teddy Venel, Brice Panel, Richard Maunier	3:02.33		8
2	Great Britain	Robert Tobin, Dale Garland, Conrad Williams, Martyn Rooney	3:02.66		7
3	Germany	Simon Kirch, Kamghe Gaba, Florian Seitz, Bastian Swillims	3:03.04		6
4	Poland	Rafał Wieruszewski, Piotr Kędzia, Piotr Klimczak, Kacper Kozłowski	3:03.16		5
5	Italy	Claudio Licciardello, Luca Galletti, Matteo Galvan, Andrea Barberi	3:03.66		4
6	Russia	Maksim Dyldin, Aleksandr Derevyagin, Ivan Buzolin, Denis Alekseyev	3:05.16		3
	Greece	Petros Kiriakidis, Dimitrios Regas, Padelis Melahrinoudis, Periklis Iakovakis	~~3:08.24~~	DQ, doping	0
7	Spain	Mark Ujakpor, David Canal, Daniel Ruiz, Santiago Ezquerro	3:08.71		2

=== High jump ===
June 21

Rank	Name	Nationality	Result	Notes	Points
1	Andrey Silnov	Russia	2.32		8
2	Andrea Bettinelli	Italy	2.30	=SB	7
3	Javier Bermejo	Spain	2.24		6
4	Mustapha Raïfak	France	2.24	SB	5
5	Samson Oni	Great Britain	2.20		4
6	Raúl Spank	Great Britain	2.15		3
7	Grzegorz Sposób	Poland	2.15		2
8	Konstadinos Baniotis	Greece	2.15		1

=== Pole vault ===
June 22

Rank	Name	Nationality	Result	Notes	Points
1	Danny Ecker	Germany	5.55		8
2	Przemysław Czerwiński	Poland	5.55		7
3	Steven Lewis	Great Britain	5.40		6
4	Stavros Kouroupakis	Greece	5.40	SB	5
5	Giorgio Piantella	Italy	5.40		4
6	Javier Gazol	Spain	5.40	SB	4
	Romain Mesnil	France	NM		0
	Sergey Kucheryanu	Russia	NM		0

=== Long jump ===
June 21

Rank	Name	Nationality	Result	Notes	Points
1	Louis Tsatoumas	Greece	8.17		8
2	Marcin Starzak	Poland	8.09		7
3	Nils Winter	Germany	8.05		6
4	Chris Tomlinson	Great Britain	7.89		5
5	Kafétien Gomis	France	7.76		4
6	Ferdinando Iucolano	Italy	7.69		3
7	Dmitriy Plotnikov	Russia	7.65		2
8	Jonathan Martínez	Spain	7.05		1

=== Triple jump ===
June 22

Rank	Name	Nationality	Result	Notes	Points
1	Phillips Idowu	Great Britain	17.46		8
2	Colomba Fofana	France	17.21		7
3	Fabrizio Schembri	Italy	17.01	SB	6
4	Igor Spasovkhodskiy	Russia	16.75		5
5	Dimitrios Tsiamis	Greece	16.71		4
6	Charles Friedek	Germany	16.70		3
7	Andrés Capellán	Spain	16.14		2
8	Mateusz Parlicki	Poland	16.09w		1

=== Shot put ===
June 21

Rank	Name	Nationality	Result	Notes	Points
1	Peter Sack	Germany	20.41		8
2	Tomasz Majewski	Poland	20.32		7
3	Yves Niaré	France	20.31		6
4	Manuel Martínez	Spain	20.24		5
5	Pavel Sofin	Russia	20.14		4
6	Carl Myerscough	Great Britain	19.27		3
7	Andreas Anastasopoulos	Greece	18.94		2
8	Paolo Capponi	Italy	18.09		1

=== Discus throw ===
June 22

Rank	Name	Nationality	Result	Notes	Points
1	Mario Pestano	Spain	68.34		8
2	Robert Harting	Germany	65.25		7
3	Piotr Małachowski	Poland	63.20		6
4	Nikolay Sedyuk	Russia	59.23		5
5	Emeka Udechuku	Great Britain	59.11		4
6	Hannes Kirchler	Italy	59.00		3
7	Spiridon Arabatzis	Greece	57.25		2
8	Jean-François Aurokiom	France	55.25		1

=== Hammer throw ===
June 21

Rank	Name	Nationality	Result	Notes	Points
1	Szymon Ziółkowski	Poland	79.26		8
2	Nicola Vizzoni	Italy	77.32		7
3	Markus Esser	Germany	75.07		6
4	Alexandros Papadimitriou	Greece	74.40		5
5	Frédéric Pouzy	France	72.18		4
6	Aleksey Zagornyi	Russia	71.76		3
7	Mike Floyd	Great Britain	67.86		2
8	Javier Cienfuegos	Spain	65.11		1

=== Javelin throw ===
June 22

Rank	Name	Nationality	Result	Notes	Points
1	Peter Esenwein	Germany	79.23		8
2	Laurent Dorique	France	75.97		7
3	Igor Janik	Poland	75.65		6
4	Roberto Bertolini	Italy	74.56		5
5	Igor Sukhomlinov	Russia	73.78		4
6	Georgios Iltsios	Greece	73.12		3
7	Michael Allen	Great Britain	70.63		2
8	Gustavo Dacal	Spain	68.32		1

== Women's results ==
=== 100 metres ===
June 21
Wind: +1.3 m/s

Rank	Name	Nationality	Time	Notes	Points
1	Yulia Nestsiarenka	Belarus	11.17		8
2	Emma Ania	Great Britain	11.22		7
3	Yevgeniya Polyakova	Russia	11.26		6
4	Anita Pistone	Italy	11.27	PB	5
5	Carima Louami	France	11.31	=SB	4
6	Nataliya Pohrebnyak	Ukraine	11.35		3
7	Daria Korczyńska	Poland	11.39		2
8	Verena Sailer	Germany	11.44		1

=== 200 metres ===
June 22
Wind: -0.2 m/s

Rank	Name	Nationality	Time	Notes	Points
1	Muriel Hurtis	France	22.75		8
2	Christine Ohuruogu	Great Britain	23.23		7
3	Natalya Rusakova	Russia	23.29		6
4	Vincenza Calì	Italy	23.48		5
5	Ewelina Ptak	Poland	23.51		4
6	Iryna Shtanhyeyeva	Ukraine	23.67		3
7	Volha Astashka	Belarus	23.78		2
8	Mareike Peters	Germany	23.88		1

=== 400 metres ===
June 21

Rank	Name	Nationality	Time	Notes	Points
1	Nicola Sanders	Great Britain	51.17		8
2	Nataliya Pyhyda	Ukraine	51.57	=SB	7
3	Tatyana Veshkurova	Russia	52.00		6
4	Yulianna Yushchanka	Belarus	52.13	SB	5
5	Daniela Reina	Italy	52.87		4
6	Claudia Hoffmann	Germany	53.09		3
7	Agnieszka Karpiesiuk	Poland	53.15		2
8	Virginie Michanol	France	54.02		1

=== 800 metres ===
June 21

Rank	Name	Nationality	Time	Notes	Points
1	Jenny Meadows	Great Britain	2:01.20		8
2	Élodie Guégan	France	2:01.65		7
3	Anna Rostkowska	Poland	2:01.82		6
4	Olga Kotlyarova	Russia	2:02.21		5
5	Olha Yekymenko	Ukraine	2:03.58		4
6	Tatsiana Suprun	Belarus	2:04.47		3
7	Monika Merl	Germany	2:08.79		2
	Elisa Cusma Piccione	Italy	DNF		0

=== 1500 metres ===
June 22

Rank	Name	Nationality	Time	Notes	Points
1	Sylwia Ejdys	Poland	4:19.17		8
2	Nataliya Tobias	Ukraine	4:19.70		7
3	Susan Scott	Great Britain	4:19.83		6
4	Anna Alminova	Russia	4:20.52		5
5	Elisa Cusma Piccione	Italy	4:21.03		4
6	Laurane Picoche	France	4:22.17		3
7	Tatsiana Suprun	Belarus	4:23.81		2
8	Katrin Judith Trauth	Germany	4:24.06		1

=== 3000 metres ===
June 21

Rank	Name	Nationality	Time	Notes	Points
1	Lidia Chojecka	Poland	9:03.49	SB	8
2	Helen Clitheroe	Great Britain	9:04.38	SB	7
	Julie Coulaud	France	~~9:04.39~~	DQ, doping	0
3	Olga Komyagina	Russia	9:05.76		6
4	Volha Minina	Belarus	9:27.61		5
5	Tetyana Mezentseva	Ukraine	9:32.60	SB	4
6	Julia Hiller	Germany	9:42.90		3
7	Valentina Costanza	Italy	9:44.06	SB	2

=== 5000 metres ===
June 22

Rank	Name	Nationality	Time	Notes	Points
1	Nataliya Berkut	Ukraine	15:23.97		8
2	Kate Reed	Great Britain	15:40.73	SB	7
3	Regina Kashayeva	Russia	15:50.98		6
4	Volha Krautsova	Belarus	15:54.76		5
5	Vincenza Sicari	Italy	16:00.30	SB	4
6	Sabrina Mockenhaupt	Germany	16:03.53		3
7	Dorota Gruca	Poland	16:21.76		2
8	Saadia Bourgailh-Haddioui	France	16:40.60		1

=== 100 metres hurdles ===
June 22
Wind: -1.3 m/s

Rank	Name	Nationality	Time	Notes	Points
1	Yevheniya Snihur	Ukraine	12.81	PB	8
2	Aurelia Trywiańska-Kollasch	Poland	12.82		7
3	Yuliya Kondakova	Russia	12.83		6
4	Adrianna Lamalle	France	12.95		5
5	Micol Cattaneo	Italy	12.98	PB	4
6	Carolin Dietrich	Germany	12.99		3
7	Katsiaryna Paplauskaya	Belarus	13.11	SB	2
8	Sarah Claxton	Great Britain	13.20		1

=== 400 metres hurdles ===
June 21

Rank	Name	Nationality	Time	Notes	Points
1	Anastasiya Rabchenyuk	Ukraine	54.64		8
2	Anna Jesień	Poland	54.81		7
3	Jonna Tilgner	Germany	56.15		6
4	Yekaterina Bikert	Russia	56.18		5
5	Benedetta Ceccarelli	Italy	56.31		4
6	Dora Jémaa-Amirouche	France	56.91		3
7	Tasha Danvers	Great Britain	57.06		2
8	Nastassia Buldakova	Belarus	57.80	SB	1

=== 3000 metres steeplechase ===
June 21

Rank	Name	Nationality	Time	Notes	Points
1	Gulnara Galkina	Russia	9:35.32		8
2	Valentyna Zhudina	Ukraine	9:35.42		7
3	Wioletta Frankiewicz	Poland	9:39.60		6
4	Elena Romagnolo	Italy	9:40.59		5
5	Antje Möldner-Schmidt	Germany	9:41.04		4
6	Élodie Olivarès	France	9:54.89		3
7	Hatti Archer	Great Britain	9:59.36		2
	Iryna Bakhanouskaia	Belarus	~~10:42.57~~	DQ, doping	0

=== 4 × 100 metres relay ===
June 21

Rank	Nation	Athletes	Time	Note	Points
1	Russia	Yevgeniya Polyakova, Natalya Rusakova, Yuliya Gushchina, Yuliya Chermoshanskaya	42.80		8
2	Great Britain	Anyika Onuora, Montell Douglas, Jeanette Kwakye, Emma Ania	42.95		7
3	Italy	Anita Pistone, Vincenza Calì, Giulia Arcioni, Audrey Alloh	43.04	NR	6
4	Ukraine	Yelena Chebanu, Nataliya Pohrebnyak, Iryna Shtanhyeyeva, Oksana Shcherbak	43.40		5
5	Germany	Anne Cibis, Verena Sailer, Mareike Peters, Marion Wagner	43.52		4
6	Poland	Ewelina Ptak, Daria Korczyńska, Dorota Jędrusińska, Marta Jeschke	43.53		3
7	Belarus	Volha Astashka, Yuliya Balykina, Natallia Safronnikava, Yulia Nestsiarenka	43.79		2
	France	Nelly Banco, Lina Jacques-Sébastien, Muriel Hurtis, Carima Louami	DQ		0

=== 4 × 400 metres relay ===
June 22

Rank	Nation	Athletes	Time	Note	Points
1	Russia	Yuliya Gushchina, Olesya Krasnomovets, Tatyana Veshkurova, Lyudmila Litvinova	3:23.77		8
2	France	Phara Anacharsis, Thélia Sigère, Solen Désert-Mariller, Virginie Michanol	3:26.63		7
3	Belarus	Katsiaryna Bobryk, Iryna Khliustava, Anna Kozak, Yulianna Yushchanka	3:27.13		6
4	Ukraine	Kseniya Karandyuk, Oleksandra Peycheva, Anastasiya Rabchenyuk, Nataliya Pyhyda	3:27.15		5
5	Great Britain	Christine Ohuruogu, Marilyn Okoro, Vicky Barr, Kelly Sotherton	3:27.16		4
6	Germany	Jonna Tilgner, Sorina Nwachukwu, Florence Ekpo-Umoh, Claudia Hoffmann	3:27.31		3
7	Poland	Agnieszka Karpiesiuk, Grażyna Prokopek-Janáček, Izabela Kostruba-Rój, Anna Jesień	3:28.05		2
8	Italy	Marta Milani, Benedetta Ceccarelli, Chiara Bazzoni, Daniela Reina	3:34.15		1

=== High jump ===
June 22

Rank	Name	Nationality	Result	Notes	Points
1	Ariane Friedrich	Germany	2.03	SB	8
2	Viktoriya Styopina	Ukraine	1.95	=SB	6.5
2	Antonietta Di Martino	Italy	1.95		6.5
4	Svetlana Shkolina	Russia	1.93		5
5	Anne Gaëlle Jardin	France	1.88	PB	4
6	Susan Moncrieff	Great Britain	1.85		3
7	Volha Chuprova	Belarus	1.85		2
8	Kamila Stepaniuk	Poland	1.80		1

=== Pole vault ===
June 21

Rank	Name	Nationality	Result	Notes	Points
1	Yuliya Golubchikova	Russia	4.73		8
2	Anna Rogowska	Poland	4.66	SB	7
3	Silke Spiegelburg	Germany	4.59		6
4	Nataliya Mazuryk	Ukraine	4.52	PB	5
5	Arianna Farfaletti Casali	Italy	4.05		4
6	Alixe Guigon	France	3.90		3
7	Louise Butterworth	Great Britain	3.90		2
8	Yulia Taratynava	Belarus	3.75		1

=== Long jump ===
June 22

Rank	Name	Nationality	Result	Notes	Points
1	Lyudmila Kolchanova	Russia	7.04	SB	8
2	Jade Johnson	Great Britain	6.81	PB	7
3	Bianca Kappler	Germany	6.63		6
4	Viktoriya Rybalko	Ukraine	6.63		5
5	Tania Vicenzino	Italy	6.52	SB	4
6	Veranika Shutkova	Belarus	6.48		3
7	Teresa Dobija	Poland	6.35		2
8	Elise Vesanes	France	6.28		1

=== Triple jump ===
June 21

Rank	Name	Nationality	Result	Notes	Points
1	Olha Saladukha	Ukraine	14.73w		8
2	Teresa Nzola Meso Ba	France	14.51	SB	7
3	Magdelin Martinez	Italy	14.28		6
4	Anastasiya Potapova	Russia	14.25		5
5	Natallia Safronava	Belarus	14.16	SB	4
6	Katja Demut	Germany	13.40		3
7	Małgorzata Trybańska	Poland	13.39		2
8	Nony Mordi	Great Britain	13.36		1

=== Shot put ===
June 22

Rank	Name	Nationality	Result	Notes	Points
	Yulia Leantsiuk	Belarus	~~19.43~~	DQ, doping	0
1	Christina Schwanitz	Germany	18.55		8
2	Anna Omarova	Russia	18.30		7
3	Chiara Rosa	Italy	18.03		6
4	Krystyna Zabawska	Poland	17.99		5
5	Laurence Manfrédi	France	17.39		4
6	Hanna Samolyuk	Ukraine	15.12		3
7	Rebecca Peake	Great Britain	14.84		2

=== Discus throw ===
June 21

Rank	Name	Nationality	Result	Notes	Points
1	Svetlana Saykina	Russia	62.56		8
2	Nataliya Semenova	Ukraine	62.25		7
3	Joanna Wiśniewska	Poland	59.01		6
4	Mélina Robert-Michon	France	58.97		5
5	Nadine Müller	Germany	57.85		4
6	Hanna Mazhunova	Belarus	57.47		3
7	Philippa Roles	Great Britain	56.36		2
8	Laura Bordignon	Italy	55.88		1

=== Hammer throw ===
June 22

Rank	Name	Nationality	Result	Notes	Points
1	Aksana Miankova	Belarus	75.97		8
2	Manuela Montebrun	France	72.18		7
3	Iryna Novozhylova	Ukraine	71.12		6
4	Kamila Skolimowska	Poland	71.07		5
5	Silvia Salis	Italy	70.05		4
6	Betty Heidler	Germany	69.67		3
7	Zoe Derham	Great Britain	66.85		2
8	Mariya Bespalova	Russia	65.97		1

=== Javelin throw ===
June 21

Rank	Name	Nationality	Result	Notes	Points
1	Natallia Shymchuk	Belarus	63.24	NR	8
2	Mariya Abakumova	Russia	61.78		7
3	Zahra Bani	Italy	58.13		6
4	Goldie Sayers	Great Britain	57.76		5
5	Christina Obergföll	Germany	57.07		4
6	Nadia Vigliano	France	55.66		3
7	Urszula Piwnicka	Poland	55.45		2
8	Marharyta Dorozhon	Ukraine	50.57		1
