= 2006 European Athletics Championships – Women's 4 × 400 metres relay =

2006 4×400 meters championship

Women's 4 × 400 metres relay at the European Athletics Championships

The women's 4 × 400 metres relay at the 2006 European Athletics Championships were held at the Ullevi on 12 and 13 August.

== Medalists ==
Gold	Silver	Bronze
Russia; Svetlana Pospelova; Natalia Ivanova; Olga Zaytseva; Tatyana Veshkurova; Yelena Migunova; Tatyana Firova	Belarus; Yulyana Zhalniaruk; Sviatlana Usovich; Anna Kozak; Ilona Usovich; Ekaterina Bobrik; Iryna Khliustava	Poland; Monika Bejnar; Grażyna Prokopek; Ewelina Sętowska; Anna Jesień; Marta Chrust-Rożej

== Schedule ==
Date	Time	Round
12 August 2006	15:05	Heats
13 August 2006	16:15	Final

== Results ==
KEY:	Q	Automatic qualifiers	q	Non-automatic qualifiers	NR	National record	PB	Personal best	SB	Seasonal best

=== Heats ===
First 3 in each heat (Q) and the next 2 fastest (q) advance to the Final.

Rank	Heat	Nation	Athlete	Time	Notes
1	1	Russia	Yelena Migunova, Natalia Ivanova, Tatyana Firova, Svetlana Pospelova	3:25.86	Q
2	1	Belarus	Ekaterina Bobrik, Iryna Khliustava, Anna Kozak, Sviatlana Usovich	3:26.71	Q
3	2	United Kingdom	Jenny Meadows, Emma Duck, Marilyn Okoro, Lee McConnell	3:27.92	Q
4	2	Germany	Korinna Fink, Anja Pollmächer, Claudia Hoffmann, Claudia Marx	3:28.01	Q
5	1	Ukraine	Kseniya Karandyuk, Oksana Ilyushkina, Oksana Shcherbak, Nataliya Pyhyda	3:28.14	Q
6	2	Poland	Grażyna Prokopek, Ewelina Sętowska, Marta Chrust-Rożej, Anna Jesień	3:29.71	Q
7	1	France	Phara Anacharsis, Thélia Sigère, Anita Mormand, Solene Desert	3:30.00	q
8	2	Bulgaria	Monika Gachevska, Mariyana Dimitrova, Teodora Kolarova, Nedyalka Nedkova	3:30.36	q
9	1	Sweden	Beatrice Dahlgren, Lena Aruhn, Emma Björkman, Erica Mårtensson	3:31.40	
10	2	Czech Republic	Jitka Bartoničková, Alena Rücklová, Zuzana Bergrová, Zuzana Hejnová	3:34.47	
11	2	Lithuania	Edita Lingytė, Jekaterina Šakovič, Aina Valatkevičiūtė, Jūratė Kudirkaitė	3:37.68	

=== Final ===
Rank	Nation	Athletes	Time	Notes
1st place, gold medalist(s)	Russia	Svetlana Pospelova, Natalia Ivanova, Olga Zaytseva, Tatyana Veshkurova	3:25.12	
2nd place, silver medalist(s)	Belarus	Yulyana Zhalniaruk, Sviatlana Usovich, Anna Kozak, Ilona Usovich	3:27.69	
3rd place, bronze medalist(s)	Poland	Monika Bejnar, Grażyna Prokopek, Ewelina Sętowska, Anna Jesień	3:27.77	
4	United Kingdom	Lee McConnell, Emma Duck, Marilyn Okoro, Nicola Sanders	3:28.17	
5	Germany	Korinna Fink, Claudia Hoffmann, Anja Pollmächer, Claudia Marx	3:28.18	
6	Ukraine	Kseniya Karandyuk, Oksana Ilyushkina, Oksana Shcherbak, Nataliya Pyhyda	3:30.95	
7	France	Phara Anacharsis, Thélia Sigère, Anita Mormand, Solene Desert	3:32.38	
8	Bulgaria	Monika Gachevska, Mariyana Dimitrova, Teodora Kolarova, Nedyalka Nedkova	3:33.75	
