= 2007 European Athletics Indoor Championships – Women's 4 × 400 metres relay =

The Women's 4 × 400 metres relay event at the 2007 European Athletics Indoor Championships was held on March 4.

== Results ==
Rank	Team	Athlete	Time	Notes
1st place, gold medalist(s)	Belarus	Yulianna Yuschanka; Iryna Khliustava; Sviatlana Usovich; Ilona Usovich	3:27.83	NR
2nd place, silver medalist(s)	Russia	Olesya Zykina; Natalia Ivanova; Zhanna Kashcheyeva; Natalya Antyukh	3:28.16	
3rd place, bronze medalist(s)	Great Britain	Emma Duck; Nicola Sanders; Kim Wall; Lee McConnell	3:28.69	NR
4	Poland	Zuzanna Radecka-Pakaszewska; Aneta Lemiesz; Agnieszka Karpiesiuk; Grażyna Prokopek	3:30.31	
5	Germany	Claudia Hoffmann; Jana Neubert; Anja Pollmächer; Jonna Tilgner	3:32.46	
	Ukraine	Kseniya Karandyuk; Oksana Ilyushkina; Olha Zavhorodnya; Oleksandra Peycheva	DQ	
