= 2007 European Athletics Indoor Championships – Women's 400 metres =

The Women's 400 metres event at the 2007 European Athletics Indoor Championships was held on March 2–3.

== Medalists ==
Gold	Silver	Bronze
Nicola Sanders; Great Britain	Ilona Usovich; Belarus	Olesya Zykina; Russia

== Results ==
=== Heats ===
First 3 of each heat (Q) and the next 3 fastest (q) qualified for the semifinals.

Rank	Heat	Name	Nationality	Time	Notes
1	3	Ilona Usovich	Belarus	51.86	Q
2	2	Nicola Sanders	Great Britain	52.15	Q
3	1	Angela Moroșanu	Romania	52.16	Q
4	2	Olesya Zykina	Russia	52.19	Q
5	3	Grażyna Prokopek	Poland	52.44	Q
6	1	Tatyana Veshkurova	Russia	52.54	Q
6	2	Zuzanna Radecka-Pakaszewska	Poland	52.54	Q, PB
8	2	Ionela Tîrlea	Romania	52.70	q
9	1	Emma Duck	Great Britain	52.95	Q
9	3	Daniela Reina	Italy	52.95	Q
11	1	Claudia Hoffmann	Germany	53.01	q
12	3	Yelena Novikova	Russia	53.13	q
13	2	Maris Mägi	Estonia	53.16	NR
14	3	Danijela Grgić	Croatia	53.35	
15	1	Agnieszka Karpiesiuk	Poland	53.78	SB
16	3	Alissa Kallinicou	Cyprus	55.96	

=== Semifinals ===
First 3 of each semifinals qualified directly (Q) for the final.

Rank	Heat	Name	Nationality	Time	Notes
1	2	Nicola Sanders	Great Britain	51.06	Q
2	1	Ilona Usovich	Belarus	51.23	Q
3	2	Tatyana Veshkurova	Russia	51.69	Q
4	1	Olesya Zykina	Russia	51.84	Q
5	1	Grażyna Prokopek	Poland	52.00	Q, NR
6	2	Angela Moroșanu	Romania	52.42	Q
7	1	Ionela Tîrlea	Romania	52.62	SB
8	2	Claudia Hoffmann	Germany	52.76	
9	2	Daniela Reina	Italy	53.00	
10	1	Emma Duck	Great Britain	53.02	
11	2	Zuzanna Radecka-Pakaszewska	Poland	53.18	
12	1	Yelena Novikova	Russia	53.66	

=== Final ===
Rank	Name	Nationality	Time	Notes
1st place, gold medalist(s)	Nicola Sanders	Great Britain	50.02	NR
2nd place, silver medalist(s)	Ilona Usovich	Belarus	51.00	PB
3rd place, bronze medalist(s)	Olesya Zykina	Russia	51.69	SB
4	Angela Moroșanu	Romania	51.93	PB
5	Tatyana Veshkurova	Russia	51.96	
6	Grażyna Prokopek	Poland	52.86	
