= Athletics at the 2008 Summer Olympics – Women's 4 × 400 metres relay =

Women's 4 × 400 metres relay at the Games of the XXIX Olympiad
- Venue: Beijing National Stadium
- Dates: 22 August 2008 (heats); 23 August 2008 (final)
- Teams: 16
- Winning time: 3:18.54

Medalists
1st place, gold medalist(s)		Mary Wineberg; Allyson Felix; Monique Henderson; Sanya Richards; Natasha Hastings*	United States
2nd place, silver medalist(s)		Shericka Williams; Shereefa Lloyd; Rosemarie Whyte; Novlene Williams; Bobby-Gaye Wilkins*	Jamaica
3rd place, bronze medalist(s)		Christine Ohuruogu; Kelly Sotherton; Marilyn Okoro; Nicola Sanders	Great Britain

The women's 4 × 400 metres relay event at the 2008 Olympic Games took place on 22 and 23 August at the Beijing Olympic Stadium.

There were only 16 NOCs competing at this event. These 16 NOCs were selected by the average of the two best marks at the qualifying period.

In 2016, it was announced that a reanalysis of samples from the 2008 Summer Olympics resulted in a doping violation by Tatyana Firova. Accordingly, the Russian team was disqualified, and the Russian team were stripped of their 4 × 400 m relay silver medals. 4th placed Belarus was also disqualified due to a doping violation by anchor runner Sviatlana Usovich. Medals of the other teams have been reallocated by the IAAF.

== Records ==
Prior to this competition, the existing world and Olympic records were as follows.

World record	Soviet Union (URS) (Tatyana Ledovskaya, Olga Nazarova, Mariya Pinigina, Olga Bryzgina)	3:15.17	Seoul, South Korea	1 October 1988
Olympic record	Soviet Union (Tatyana Ledovskaya, Olga Nazarova, Mariya Pinigina, Olga Bryzgina)	3:15.17	Seoul, South Korea	1 October 1988

No new world or Olympic records were set for this event.

== Qualification summary ==
Pos	NOC	2 races		1	2
Pos	NOC	Total	Average	1	2
1	United States	6:40.71	3:20.35	3:18.55	3:22.16
2	Russia	6:43.74	3:21.87	3:20.25	3:23.49
3	Great Britain	6:45.49	3:22.74	3:20.04	3:25.45
4	Belarus	6:45.55	3:22.77	3:21.88	3:23.67
5	Jamaica	6:45.87	3:22.93	3:19.73	3:26.14
6	Poland	6:52.81	3:26.41	3:26.36	3:26.45
7	Cuba	6:54.09	3:27.04	3:27.04	3:27.05
8	Mexico	6:54.89	3:27.44	3:27.14	3:27.75
9	France	6:55.25	3:27.62	3:26.63	3:28.62
10	Ukraine	6:55.82	3:27.91	3:27.15	3:28.67
11	Germany	6:56.83	3:28.41	3:27.31	3:29.52
12	Nigeria	6:57.71	3:28.85	3:27.97	3:29.74
13	Brazil	6:58.00	3:29.00	3:28.89	3:29.11
14	Japan	7:00.70	3:30.35	3:30.17	3:30.53
15	India	7:00.84	3:30.42	3:28.29	3:32.55
16	China	7:01.89	3:30.95	3:29.75	3:32.14
Reserves
17	Italy	7:01.96	3:30.98	3:30.89	3:31.07
18	Canada	7:02.71	3:31.35	3:30.34	3:32.37
19	Greece	7:03.27	3:31.64	3:30.20	3:33.07
20	Romania	7:05.79	3:32.90	3:30.22	3:35.57

== Results ==
All times shown are in seconds.

- Q denotes automatic qualification.
- q denotes fastest losers.
- DNS denotes did not start.
- DNF denotes did not finish.
- DQ denotes disqualified
- AR denotes area record.
- NR denotes national record.
- PB denotes personal best.
- SB denotes season's best.

=== Round 1 ===
First 3 in each heat (Q) and the next 2 fastest (q) advance to the Final.

Heat	Lane	Nation	Competitors	Results	Notes
2	7	United States	Mary Wineberg, Monique Henderson, Natasha Hastings, Sanya Richards	3:22.45	Q, SB
2	3	Jamaica	Novelene Williams, Shereefa Lloyd, Bobby-Gaye Wilkins, Shericka Williams	3:22.60	Q, SB
2	6	Belarus	Yulyana Yushchanka, Iryna Khliustava, Ilona Usovich, Sviatlana Usovich	3:22.78	DQ (~~Q, SB~~)
1	3	Russia	Elena Migunova, Tatyana Veshkurova, Lyudmila Litvinova, Tatiana Firova	3:23.71	DQ (~~Q, SB~~)
2	2	Nigeria	Folashade Abugan, Joy Amechi Eze, Oluoma Nwoke, Ajoke Odumosu	3:24.10	q, SB
1	7	Cuba	Roxana Díaz, Zulia Calatayud, Susana Clement, Indira Terrero	3:25.46	Q, SB
1	5	Great Britain	Nicola Sanders, Kelly Sotherton, Marilyn Okoro, Christine Ohuruogu	3:25.48	Q, SB
1	6	Germany	Jonna Valesca Tilgner, Sorina Nwachukwu, Florence Ekpo-Umoh, Claudia Hoffmann	3:25.55	q, SB
2	4	France	Phara Anacharsis, Thelia Sigere, Solen Desert, Virginie Michanol	3:26.61	SB
1	8	Ukraine	Oksana Shcherbak, Tetyana Petlyuk, Kseniya Karandyuk, Nataliya Pyhyda	3:27.44	
1	2	Poland	Monika Bejnar, Jolanta Wojcik, Anna Jesień, Grażyna Prokopek	3:28.23	
1	4	India	Satti Geetha, Manjeet Kaur, Chithra Kulathummuriyil Soman, Mandeep Kaur	3:28.83	
2	9	Brazil	Maria Laura Almirao, Josiane Tito, Emmily Pinheiro, Lucimar Teodoro	3:30.10	
2	5	Mexico	Ruth Grajeda, Gabriela Medina, Nallely Vela, Zudikey Rodriguez	3:30.36	
1	9	Japan	Satomi Kubokura, Asami Tanno, Mayu Kida, Sayaka Aoki	3:30.52	SB
2	8	China	Han Ling, Chen Jingwen, Wang Jinping, Tang Xiaoyin	3:30.77	

=== Final ===
Rank	Lane	Nation	Competitors	Results	Notes
1st place, gold medalist(s)	4	United States	Mary Wineberg, Allyson Felix, Monique Henderson, Sanya Richards	3:18.54	SB
2nd place, silver medalist(s)	7	Jamaica	Shericka Williams, Shereefa Lloyd, Rosemarie Whyte, Novelene Williams	3:20.40	SB
3rd place, bronze medalist(s)	9	Great Britain	Christine Ohuruogu, Kelly Sotherton, Marilyn Okoro, Nicola Sanders	3:22.68	SB
4	6	Cuba	Roxana Díaz, Zulia Calatayud, Susana Clement, Indira Terrero	3:23.21	NR
5	2	Nigeria	Joy Amechi Eze, Folashade Abugan, Oluoma Nwoke, Ajoke Odumosu	3:23.74	SB
6	3	Germany	Jonna Valesca Tilgner, Sorina Nwachukwu, Florence Ekpo-Umoh, Claudia Hoffmann	3:28.45	
DSQ (2nd)	5	Russia	Yulia Gushchina, Lyudmila Litvinova, Tatyana Firova, Anastasiya Kapachinskaya	DSQ (3:18.82)	Doping
DSQ (4th)	8	Belarus	Anna Kozak, Iryna Khliustava, Ilona Usovich, Sviatlana Usovich	DSQ (3:21.85)	Doping
