= 2005 World Championships in Athletics – Women's 4 × 400 metres relay =

The 4 × 400 metre relay at the 2005 World Championships in Athletics was held at the Helsinki Olympic Stadium on August 13 and August 14.

== Medals ==
Gold:	Silver:	Bronze:
Russia Yuliya Pechonkina; Olesya Krasnomovets; Natalya Antyukh; Svetlana Pospelova	Jamaica Shericka Williams; Novlene Williams; Ronetta Smith; Lorraine Fenton	Great Britain Lee McConnell; Donna Fraser; Nicola Sanders; Christine Ohuruogu

== Qualifying ==
From the initial two heats the first three teams in each plus two fastest losers progressed through to the final.

All times shown are in seconds.

- Q denotes automatic qualification.
- q denotes fastest losers.
- DNS denotes did not start.
- DNF denotes did not finish.
- AR denotes area record.
- NR denotes national record.
- PB denotes personal best.
- SB denotes season's best.

=== Heat 1 ===
1. Russia (Olesya Krasnomovets, Natalya Antyukh, Tatyana Firova, Olesya Zykina) 3:20.32 Q (WL)
2. Poland (Anna Guzowska, Monika Bejnar, Grażyna Prokopek, Zuzanna Radecka) 3:26.04 Q
3. Belarus (Natalya Sologub, Yulyana Zhalniaruk, Anna Kozak, Ilona Usovich) 3:27.65 Q (SB)
4. Germany (Claudia Marx, Claudia Hoffman, Corinna Fink, Ulrike Urbansky) 3:27.96 q
5. Senegal (Aïda Diop, Fatou Bintou Fall, Aminata Diouf, Amy Mbacké Thiam) 3:29.03 (SB)
6. Romania (Angela Moroșanu, Mihaela Stancescu-Neacsu, Alina Râpanu, Maria Rus) 3:30.97
7. Bulgaria (Monika Gachevska, Mariyana Dimitrova, Nedyalka Nedkova, Monika Ivanova) 3:38.96

=== Heat 2 ===
1. Great Britain (Lee McConnell, Donna Fraser, Nicola Sanders, Christine Ohuruogu) 3:26.19 Q (SB)
2. Brazil (Maria Laura Almirão, Geisa Aparecida Coutinho, Josiane Tito, Lucimar Teodoro) 3:26.82 Q (AR)
3. Ukraine (Antonina Yefremova, Oksana Ilyushkina, Liliya Pilyuhina, Natalya Pygyda) 3:27.23 Q
4. Jamaica (Shericka Williams, Novlene Williams, Ronetta Smith, Lorraine Fenton) 3:27.87 q (SB)
5. Mexico (Ruth Grajeda, Gabriela Medina, Mayra González, Magali Yañez) 3:31.41 (SB)
6. South Africa (Amanda Kotze, Dominique Koster, Surita Febbraio, Estie Wittstock) 3:31.71 (SB)
- United States (Suziann Reid, Monique Hennagan, Moushaumi Robinson, Monique Henderson) DSQ

=== Final ===
1. Russia (Yuliya Pechonkina, Olesya Krasnomovets, Natalya Antyukh, Svetlana Pospelova) 3:20.95
2. Jamaica (Shericka Williams, Novlene Williams, Ronetta Smith, Lorraine Fenton) 3:23.29 (SB)
3. Great Britain (Lee McConnell, Donna Fraser, Nicola Sanders, Christine Ohuruogu) 3:24.44 (SB)
4. Poland (Anna Guzowska, Monika Bejnar, Grażyna Prokopek, Anna Jesień) 3:24.49 (NR)
5. Ukraine (Antonina Yefremova, Oksana Ilyushkina, Liliya Pilyuhina, Natalya Pygyda) 3:28.00
6. Germany (Claudia Marx, Claudia Hoffman, Corinna Fink, Ulrike Urbansky) 3:28.39
- Brazil (Maria Laura Almirão, Geisa Aparecida Coutinho, Josiane Tito, Lucimar Teodoro) DSQ
- Belarus (Alena Nevmerzhitskaya, Natalya Sologub, Anna Kozak, Ilona Usovich) DSQ
