= List of Belarusian records in athletics =

The following are the national records in athletics in Belarus maintained by Belarus Athletic Federation (BFLA).

== Outdoor ==
Key to tables: Awaiting ratification Record not kept by BFLA Not ratified or later rescinded by BFLA

=== Men ===
Event	Record	Athlete	Date	Meet	Place	Ref.
100 m	10.27 (+0.9 m/s)	Sergey Kornelyuk	28 May 1994		Biała Podlaska, Poland	
150 m	16.01 (−1.4 m/s)	Yahor Papou	8 May 2016	26. Internationales Läufermeeting	Pliezhausen, Germany	
200 m	20.40 (+1.5 m/s)	Mikita Zhyhar	25 July 2025	Belarusian Championships	Brest, Belarus	
300 m	34.36	Aliaksandr Krasouski	8 May 2016	26. Internationales Läufermeeting	Pliezhausen, Germany	
400 m	45.43	Aliaksandr Linnik	20 June 2015	European Team Championships – Super League	Cheboksary, Russia	
600 m	1:19.26	Piotr Khadasevich	8 May 2016	26. Internationales Läufermeeting	Pliezhausen, Germany	
800 m	1:44.43	Anis Ananenka	10 July 2013	Gyulai Istvàn Memorial	Budapest, Hungary	
1500 m	3:36.16	Azat Rakipau	6 August 1992	Olympic Games	Barcelona, Spain	
3000 m	7:46.3 h	Aleksandr Fedotkin	24 June 1978		Vilnius, Soviet Union	
5000 m	13:17.66	Aleksandr Fedotkin	10 July 1979		Budapest, Hungary	
10,000 m	27:41.89	Aleksandr Fedotkin	4 September 1979	Memorial Van Damme	Brussels, Belgium	
10 km (road)	28:35	Zdzislav Gapeyenko	22 April 2001		Poznań, Poland	
15 km (road)	44:07	Alexandre Bourtsjev	30 April 1995		La Courneuve, France	
20 km (road)	1:01:24	Azat Rakipau	6 March 2005		Newark, United States	
Half marathon	1:02:32	Viktor Mosgovoy	4 October 1992		Breda, Netherlands	
25 km (road)	1:17:55	Vladimir Kotov	7 May 1995	Berlin 25K	Berlin, Germany	
Marathon	2:10:58	Vladimir Kotov	24 May 1980		Moscow, Soviet Union	
110 m hurdles	13.41	Viktor Myasnikov	4 June 1980		Leningrad, Soviet Union	(Note: Recognized by the federation, but marked as "doubtful timing" by the IAAF)
110 m hurdles	13.46 (+1.9 m/s)	Maksim Lynsha	27 July 2008		Minsk, Belarus	
110 m hurdles	13.46 (+0.6 m/s)	Maksim Lynsha	20 August 2009	World Championships	Berlin, Germany	
400 m hurdles	47.92	Aleksandr Vasilyev	17 August 1985		Moscow, Soviet Union	
3000 m steeplechase	8:25.2	Aleksandr Vorobey	6 July 1980		Moscow, Soviet Union	
High jump	2.37 m	Maksim Nedasekau	6 July 2021	Gyulai István Memorial	Székesfehérvár, Hungary	
High jump	2.37 m	Maksim Nedasekau	1 August 2021	Olympic Games	Tokyo, Japan	
Pole vault	6.00 m (Note: Outdoor best; indoor mark ratified as absolute record.)	Dmitri Markov	20 February 1998		North Shore City, New Zealand	
Long jump	8.33 m (+0.4 m/s)	Aliaksandar Hlavatski	7 August 1996		Sestriere, Italy	
Triple jump	17.77 m (+1.0 m/s)	Aleksandr Kovalenko	18 July 1987		Bryansk, Soviet Union	
Shot put	22.09 m	Sergey Kasnauskas	13 August 1984		Minsk, Soviet Union	
Shot put	22.10 m X	Andrei Mikhnevich	11 August 2011		Minsk, Belarus	
Discus throw	69.44 m	Georgiy Kolnootchenko	3 July 1982		Indianapolis, United States	
Hammer throw	84.90 m	Vadim Devyatovskiy	21 July 2005		Staiki, Belarus	
Hammer throw	84.92 m	Vadim Devyatovskiy	21 July 2005		Minsk, Belarus	
Hammer throw	86.73 m X	Ivan Tsikhan	2 July 2005		Brest, Belarus	
Javelin throw	87.53 m	Aliaksei Katkavets	8 February 2022	Belarus Winter Throwing Championships	Minsk, Belarus	
Decathlon	8735 pts	Eduard Hämäläinen	28–29 May 1994	Hypo-Meeting	Götzis, Austria	
Decathlon	100m / Long jump / Shot put / High jump / 400m / 110m H / Discus / Pole vault / Javelin / 1500m; 10.50 (+2.1 m/s) / 7.26 m (+1.0 m/s) / 16.05 m / 2.11 m / 47.63 / 13.82 (−3.0 m/s) / 49.70 m / 4.90 m / 60.32 m / 4:35.09					
3000 m walk (track)	11:08.5 h	Frants Kostyukevich	30 August 1985		Banská Bystrica, Slovakia	
5000 m walk (track)	20:25.18	Nikita Koliada	7 May 2017			
5000 m walk (track)	18:31.76	Frants Kostyukevich	7 February 1993		Villeneuve d'Ascq, France	
5 km walk (road)	20:40.5	Nikolai Seredovitch	2 July 2000		Gomel, Belarus	
10 km walk (road)	38:59.6	Nikolai Iljitsch Matveev	20 May 1980		Minsk, Soviet Union	
20 km walk (road)	1:18:12	Artur Meliashkevich	10 March 2001		Brest, Belarus	
50 km walk (road)	3:37:36	Yevgeniy Ivchenko	23 May 1980		Moscow, Soviet Union	(Note: Record by Iwtschenko recognized by the federation, Potashovs by the IAAF)
50 km walk (road)	3:40:02	Aleksandr Potashov	27 May 1990		Moscow, Soviet Union	
4 × 100 m relay	39.44	Byelorussian SSR; Andrei Cherkashin; Aleksandr Starovoitov; Leonid Safronnikov; Aleksandr Knysh	13 July 1991		Kyiv, Soviet Union	
4 × 400 m relay	3:03.78	Belarus; Mikhail Ratnikov; Leonid Vershinin; Sergei Kozlov; Aleksandr Yelistratov	20 June 2004	European Cup, First League, Group A	Plovdiv, Plovdiv	
4 × 800 m relay	7:11.1a	Byelorussian SSR; Starovoitov; Troshchilo; Podolyakov; Kirov	25 July 1979		Moscow, Soviet Union	

=== Women ===
Event	Record	Athlete	Date	Meet	Place	Ref.
100 m	10.92 (+0.1 m/s)	Yulia Nestsiarenka	21 August 2004	Olympic Games	Athens, Greece	
150 m	17.57 (±0.0 m/s)	Krystsina Tsimanouskaya	8 May 2016	26. Internationales Läufermeeting	Pliezhausen, Germany	
200 m	22.68 (+0.3 m/s)	Natalya Safronnikova	24 June 2001		Bremen, Germany	
400 m	50.31	Ilona Usovich	27 August 2007	World Championships	Osaka, Japan	
600 m	1:27.05	Marina Arzamasova	27 August 2017	ISTAF Berlin	Berlin, Germany	
800 m	1:56.1 h	Ravilya Agletdinova	21 August 1982		Podolsk, Soviet Union	(Note: Older record recognized by the IAAF, newer by the belarusian federation)
800 m	1:56.24	Ravilya Agletdinova-Kotovich	1 August 1985		Leningrad, Soviet Union	
1000 m	2:36.56	Natalya Dukhnova	6 June 1993			
1500 m	3:58.4 h	Ravilya Agletdinova-Kotovich	18 August 1985		Moscow, Soviet Union	
Mile	4:30.86	Darya Barysevich	6 September 2016	Palio Città della Quercia	Rovereto, Italy	
3000 m	8:32.89	Alesya Turava	6 July 2001	Meeting Areva	Saint-Denis, France	
5000 m	14:47.75	Volha Kravtsova	13 August 2005	World Championships	Helsinki, Finland	
5 km (road)	15:25	Volha Kravtsova	27 August 2006		Binghamton, United States	
10,000 m	31:42.02	Yekaterina Khramenkova	2 August 1988		Kyiv, Soviet Union	
10 km (road)	32:23	Yekaterina Khramenkova	24 June 1989		New York City, United States	
15 km (road)	49:21	Alena Mazouka	September 1996		Piła, Poland	
One hour	16679 m	Alla Doudayeva	8 August 1998		Borgholzhausen, Germany	
20 km (road)	1:07:32+	Volha Mazuronak	24 March 2018	World Half Marathon Championships	Valencia, Spain	
Half marathon	1:10:57 Wo	Volha Mazuronak	24 March 2018	World Half Marathon Championships	Valencia, Spain	
25 km (road)
25 km (road)	1:24:44+ X	Aleksandra Duliba	13 October 2013	Chicago Marathon	Chicago, United States	
30 km (road)
30 km (road)	1:41:44+ X	Aleksandra Duliba	13 October 2013	Chicago Marathon	Chicago, United States	
Marathon	2:23:54	Volha Mazuronak	24 April 2016	London Marathon	London, United Kingdom	
Marathon	2:23:44 X	Aleksandra Duliba	13 October 2013	Chicago Marathon	Chicago, United States	
Marathon	2:21:29 X	Aleksandra Duliba	21 April 2014	Boston Marathon	Boston, United States	
Marathon	2:23:06 X	Aleksandra Duliba	23 January 2015	Dubai Marathon	Dubai, United Arab Emirates	
100 m hurdles	12.41 (+0.5 m/s)	Alina Talay	31 May 2018	Liese Prokop Memorial	St. Pölten, Austria	
400 m hurdles	53.11	Tatyana Ledovskaya	29 August 1991	World Championships	Tokyo, Japan	
2000 m steeplechase	6:39.07	Valentina Michailowna Sertukova	23 July 1989		Gorky, Soviet Union	
3000 m steeplechase	9:16.51	Alesya Turova	27 July 2002		Gdańsk, Poland	
High jump	2.00 m	Tatyana Shevchik	14 May 1993		Gomel, Belarus	
High jump	2.00 m	Karyna Taranda	5 July 2019 (Note: 8 July 2019 by federation source, probably a typo)	Athletissima	Lausanne, Switzerland	
Pole vault	4.72 m	Iryna Zhuk	2 August 2020	Belarusian Championships	Minsk, Belarus	
Long jump	7.39 m (+0.5 m/s)	Yelena Belevskaya	18 July 1987		Bryansk, Soviet Union	
Triple jump	14.76 m	Ksenyia Dzetsuk	26 May 2012		Brest, Belarus	
Shot put	21.09 m	Nadezhda Ostapchuk	21 July 2005		Minsk, Belarus	
Shot put	21.58 m	Nadezhda Ostapchuk	18 July 2012	International Competitions in Memory of Belarusian Athletes	Minsk, Belarus	
Discus throw	71.58 m	Ellina Zvereva	12 June 1988		Leningrad, Soviet Union	
Hammer throw	77.32 m	Aksana Miankova	29 June 2008		Minsk, Belarus	
Hammer throw	78.69 m	Aksana Miankova	18 July 2012	International Competitions in Memory of Belarusian Athletes	Minsk, Belarus	
Javelin throw	67.47 m	Tatsiana Khaladovich	7 June 2018	Bislett Games	Oslo, Norway	
Javelin throw	71.40 m (Old design)	Natalya Schikolenko	5 June 1994		Seville, Spain	
Heptathlon	6635 pts	Svetlana Buraga	16–17 August 1993	World Championships	Stuttgart, Germany	
Heptathlon	100m H / High jump / Shot put / 200m / Long jump / Javelin / 800m; 12.95 (+0.1 m/s) / 1.84 m / 14.55 m / 23.69 (±0.0 m/s) / 6.58 m (−0.2 m/s) / 41.04 m / 2:13.65					
5000 m walk (track)	22:45.47	Anna Subkova	4 July 2018			
5 km walk (road)	20:29.00	Valentina Tsybulskaya	13 September 2003		Hildesheim, Germany	
10 km walk (road)	41:56	Larisa Smelnitskaja	10 May 1997		Eisenhüttenstadt, Germany	
10 km walk (road)	41:29	Larisa Khmelnitskaya	4 June 1995		Izhevsk, Russia	
20 km walk (road)	1:26:11	Ryta Turava	15 April 2006		Nesvizh, Belarus	
50 km walk (road)	4:12:16	Yelena Ginko	17 October 2004		Scanzorosciate, Italy	
4 × 100 m relay	42.56	Belarus; Yulia Nestsiarenka; Natalya Sologub; Alena Nevmerzhitskaya; Oksana Dragun	13 August 2005	World Championships	Helsinki, Finland	
4 × 200 m relay	1:35.6 h	Ljudmila Jukovets; Galina Alekseyuk; Yanna Yurkova; Natalya Demidova	27 July 1979		Moscow, Soviet Union	
4 × 400 m relay	3:21.88	Belarus; Anna Kozak; Iryna Khlyusova; Ilona Usovich; Sviatlana Usovich	2 September 2007	World Championships	Osaka, Japan	
4 × 400 m relay	3:21.85 X (Note: annulled due to doping violation by Sviatlana Usovich)	Belarus; Y. Yuschanka; Iryna Khliustava; Ilona Usovich; Sviatlana Usovich	23 August 2008	Olympic Games	Beijing, China	
4 × 800 m relay	8:03.85	Oksana Mernikova; Tatjana Yrebenchuk; Natalya Duchnova; Rafilya Agletdinova	27 July 1979		Portsmouth, United Kingdom	

=== Mixed ===
Event	Record	Athlete	Date	Meet	Place	Ref.
4 × 400 m relay	3:16.65	Belarus; Raman Volodzkin; Yuliya Bliznets; Hanna Mikhailova; Aliaksandr Vasileuskiy	13 June 2021	International Sprint & Relay Cup	Erzurum, Turkey	

== Indoor ==
=== Men ===
Event	Record	Athlete	Date	Meet	Place	Ref.
60 m	6.60	Maksim Lynsha	15 February 2008		Mogilev, Belarus	
100 m	10.78	Igor Burrel	1980		Moscow, Soviet Union	
150 m	16.44	Aliaksandr Linnik	23 December 2009		Minsk, Belarus	
200 m	21.14	Aliaksandr Linnik	11 February 2012	Tyson Invitational	Fayetteville, United States	
200 m	21.14	Aliaksandr Linnik	21 February 2015	Belarusian Championships	Mogilev, Belarus	
200 m	20.8 h	Sergey Konchits	5 February 1984		Minsk, Soviet Union	
300 m	33.69	Alexander Dmitrievich Troshchiev	20 February 1986		Leningrad, Soviet Union	
400 m	46.78	Aliaksandr Linnik	6 March 2015	European Championships	Prague, Czech Republic	
500 m	1:03.6 h	Andrey Sudnik	1988		Minsk, Soviet Union	
600 m	1:16.76	Ivan Komar	24 January 1998			
800 m	1:45.9	Andrey Sudnik	17 February 1991		Moscow, Soviet Union	
1000 m	2:19.27	Ivan Komar	3 February 1999		Erfurt, Germany	
1500 m	3:38.47	Ilya Karnavukhau	3 February 2022	Czech Indoor Gala	Ostrava, Czech Republic	
Mile	4:02.72	Azat Rakipov	2 July 1992		Moscow, Russia	
2000 m	5:08.12	Sergey Platonov	21 January 2011	Belarusian Open Championships	Mogilev, Belarus	
3000 m	7:45.50	Aleksandr Fedotkin	25 February 1979	European Championships	Vienna, Austria	
5000 m	13:37.19	Aleksandr Fedotkin	3 October 1983		Milan, Italy	
50 m hurdles	6.61	Viktor Mjasnikov	3 February 1974		East Berlin, East Germany	
60 m hurdles	7.50	Maksim Lynsha	17 January 2013	Minskaya Zima	Minsk, Belarus	
110 m hurdles	13.75	Viktor Mjasnikov	17 February 1980	Soviet Union Championships	Moscow, Soviet Union	
2000 m steeplechase	5:26.17	Sergey Bagdassarjan	1985		Leningrad, Soviet Union	
3000 m steeplechase	8:23.76	Nikolai Karpovitch Fjodorovitch	10 February 1991	Soviet Union Championships	Volgograd, Soviet Union	
High jump	2.37 m	Maksim Nedasekau	7 March 2021	European Championships	Toruń, Poland	
Pole vault	6.01 m	Matvei Volkov	20 February 2026	Belarus Championships	Mogilev, Belarus	
Long jump	8.10 m	Aleksandr Glavatskiy	15 January 1994		Gomel, Belarus	
Triple jump	17.39 m	Aleksandr Leonov	12 February 1988		Volgograd, Soviet Union	
Shot put	21.46 m	Sergey Kasnauskas	17 February 1984		Moscow, Soviet Union	
Shot put	21.81 m	Andrei Mikhnevich	12 February 2010	Belarus Championships	Mogilev, Belarus	
Heptathlon	6303 pts	Andrei Krauchanka	7–8 March 2014	World Championships	Sopot, Poland	
Heptathlon	60m / Long jump / Shot put / High jump / 60m H / Pole vault / 1000m; 7.12 / 7.46 m / 15.42 m / 2.21 m / 8.10 / 5.00 m / 2:41.88					
5000 m walk	18:23.88	Frants Kostyukevich	9 February 1991	Soviet Union Championships	Volgograd, Soviet Union	
5000 m walk	18:16.54	Frants Kostyukevich	4 February 1989		Gomel, Soviet Union	
10,000 m walk	38:52.4	Artur Meleshkevich	2 February 2001	Belarus Open Championships	Minsk, Belarus	
4 × 200 m relay	1:28.29	Belarus; Yuri Rodionov; Yuri Gomanov; Aliaksandr Potienko; Nikita Jakowlew	13 January 2007		Spała, Poland	
4 × 400 m relay	3:12.69	Vitebsk Region Team; Dzmitry Poluyan; Mikita Yakovlev; Andrey Syritsa; Andrey Katershal	12 February 2011	Belarus Championships	Mogilev, Belarus	

=== Women ===
Event	Record	Athlete	Date	Meet	Place	Ref.
50 m	6.26+	Yuilia Balikana	14 February 2012	Meeting Pas de Calais	Liévin, France	
60 m	7.04	Natalya Safronnikova	21 February 2001		Minsk, Belarus	
100 m	11.34	Natalya Safronnikova	12 February 2001		Tampere, Finland	
150 m	17.88	Elena Kievich	24 December 2008		Minsk, Belarus	
200 m	22.91	Natalya Safronnikova	14 March 2003	World Championships	Birmingham, United Kingdom	
300 m	37.40	Anna Kozak	2 February 2008		Mogilev, Belarus	
400 m	50.55	Svetlana Usovich	5 March 2005	European Championships	Madrid, Spain	
500 m	1:11.4 h	Tamara Kupriyanovich	24 January 1988		Vilnius, Soviet Union	
600 m	1:25.91	Ilona Usovich	2 February 2008		Mogilev, Belarus	
800 m	1:59.31	Natalya Dukhnova	9 March 1997	World Championships	Paris, France	
1000 m	2:35.89	Natalya Dukhnova	10 February 1996	AVIVA Indoor Grand Prix	Birmingham, United Kingdom	
1500 m	4:04.42	Alesya Turova	12 February 2004	GE Galan	Stockholm, Sweden	
Mile	4:33.88	Alesya Turova	4 February 2002	Meeting Pas de Calais	Liévin, France	
2000 m	5:43.99	Ravil Aftahovna Agletdinova	12 February 1983		Moscow, Soviet Union	
3000 m	8:48.02	Svetlana Kudelich	7 March 2015	European Championships	Prague, Czech Republic	
5000 m	15:48.17	Alena Mazouka	2 February 1995	Belarusian Championships	Minsk, Belarus	
50 m hurdles	6.89	Alina Talay	23 December 2011		Minsk, Belarus	
60 m hurdles	7.85	Alina Talay	6 March 2015	European Championships	Prague, Czech Republic	
60 m hurdles	7.6 h	Lidiya Yurkova	24 February 1990		Minsk, Soviet Union	
60 m hurdles	7.6 h	Lidiya Yurkova	11 January 1992		Luhansk, Ukraine	
100 m hurdles	13.3 h	Lidiya Yurkova	1988			
400 m hurdles	1:02.80	Anastasia Buldakova	18 February 2012	Meeting National	Val-de-Reuil, France	
2000 m steeplechase	6:23.29	Sviatlana Kudzelich	21 February 2010	Belarus University Games	Mogilev, Belarus	
3000 m steeplechase	9:49.56	Sviatlana Kudzelich	12 February 2010	Belarus Championships	Mogilev, Belarus	
High jump	1.98 m	Tatyana Shevchik	7 February 1993	Sparkassen Cup	Stuttgart, Germany	
Pole vault	4.80 m	Iryna Zhuk	17 February 2022	Meeting Hauts-de-France Pas-de-Calais	Liévin, France	
Long jump	7.01 m	Yelena Belevskaya	14 February 1987		Moscow, Soviet Union	
Triple jump	14.41 m	Natallia Safronava	1 February 2001		Samara, Russia	
Triple jump	14.48 m	Kseniya Dzetsuk	27 January 2012	Belarusian Cup	Gomel, Belarus	
Shot put	21.70 m (Note: indoor best; outdoor mark ratified as absolute record)	Nadezhda Ostapchuk	12 February 2010	Belarusian Championships	Mogilev, Belarus	
Weight throw	20.20 m	Alena Krechyk	24 January 2014	Jayhawk Classic	Lawrence, United States	
Pentathlon	4850 pts	Natalya Sazanovich	9 March 2001	World Championships	Lisbon, Portugal	
Pentathlon	60m H / High jump / Shot put / Long jump / 800m; 8.25 / 1.80 m / 16.31 m / 6.69 m / 2:23.20					
3000 m walk	11:54.62+	Ryta Turava	13 February 2005		Minsk, Belarus	
3000 m walk	12:04.46	Leonarda Yukhnevich	12 March 1994	European Championships	Paris, France	
5000 m walk	20:37.73	Ryta Turava	2 February 2001	Belarusian Championships	Minsk, Belarus	
10,000 m walk	43:13.00 ^{[WB]}	Viktoriya Bartash	14 February 2025	Belarusian Championships	Mogilev, Belarus	
4 × 200 m relay	1:39.94	Katsiaryna Paplauskaya; Hanna Tashpulatava; Katsiaryna Tomchik; Alena Kievich	21 February 2010	Belarus University Games	Mogilev, Belarus	
4 × 400 m relay	3:27.83	Belarus; Yulianna Yuschanka; Iryna Khliustava; Sviatlana Usovich; Ilona Usovich	4 March 2007	European Championships	Birmingham, United Kingdom	
