= 2002 European Athletics Indoor Championships – Women's 400 metres =

The women's 400 metres event at the 2002 European Athletics Indoor Championships was held on March 1–3.

== Medalists ==
Gold	Silver	Bronze
Natalya Antyukh; Russia	Claudia Marx; Germany	Karen Shinkins; Ireland

== Results ==
=== Heats ===
The first 3 of each heat qualified directly (Q) for the final.

Rank	Heat	Name	Nationality	Time	Notes
1	1	Natalya Antyukh	Russia	51.39	Q
2	2	Karen Shinkins	Ireland	51.90	Q
3	2	Catherine Murphy	Great Britain	51.95	Q
4	2	Natalya Ivanova	Russia	52.25	Q, PB
5	1	Claudia Marx	Germany	52.27	Q
6	1	Yuliya Pechonkina	Russia	52.27	Q
7	1	Sviatlana Usovich	Belarus	52.59	NR
8	1	Grażyna Prokopek	Poland	52.86	PB
9	2	Yekaterina Stankevich	Belarus	53.37	
10	2	Androula Sialou	Cyprus	54.27	

=== Final ===
Rank	Lane	Name	Nationality	Time	Notes
1st place, gold medalist(s)	6	Natalya Antyukh	Russia	51.65	
2nd place, silver medalist(s)	4	Claudia Marx	Germany	52.15	
3rd place, bronze medalist(s)	5	Karen Shinkins	Ireland	52.17	
4	1	Natalya Ivanova	Russia	52.23	PB
5	2	Yuliya Pechonkina	Russia	52.91	
6	3	Catherine Murphy	Great Britain	52.98	
