= Pollmächer =

Pollmächer is a surname. Notable people with the surname include:

- Frank André Pollmächer (born 1983), German long-distance runner
- Anja Pollmächer (born 1985, Riesa), German sprinter
