= Wang Jinping =

Wang Jinping is the name of:

- Wang Jinping (scholar and activist) (1946–2019), Taiwanese social activist
- Wang Jinping (biathlete) (born 1971), Chinese biathlete
- Wang Jinping (sprinter) (born 1987), Chinese sprinter

== See also ==
- Wang Jin-pyng (born 1941), Taiwanese politician
