= 2005 European Athletics Indoor Championships – Women's 400 metres =

The Women's 400 metres event at the 2005 European Athletics Indoor Championships was held on March 4–5.

== Medalists ==
Gold	Silver	Bronze
Svetlana Pospelova; Russia	Svetlana Usovich; Belarus	Irina Rosikhina; Russia

== Results ==
=== Heats ===
The winner of each heat (Q) and the next 3 fastest (q) qualified for the final.

Rank	Heat	Name	Nationality	Time	Notes
1	3	Svetlana Usovich	Belarus	51.35	Q, NR
2	2	Svetlana Pospelova	Russia	51.70	Q
3	1	Irina Rosikhina	Russia	51.75	Q
4	1	Ilona Usovich	Belarus	52.34	q, PB
5	3	Monika Bejnar	Poland	52.77	q, PB
6	3	Natalya Pygyda	Ukraine	52.79	q
7	1	Kim Wall	Great Britain	53.02	PB
8	2	Phara Anacharsis	France	53.20	
9	2	Małgorzata Pskit	Poland	53.23	PB
10	3	Klodiana Shala	Albania	53.60	
11	2	Lena Aruhn	Sweden	53.61	
12	2	Cora Olivero	Spain	54.35	
13	1	Maris Mägi	Estonia	54.44	
	1	Danijela Grgić	Croatia	DQ	

=== Final ===
Rank	Name	Nationality	Time	Notes
1st place, gold medalist(s)	Svetlana Pospelova	Russia	50.41	WL
2nd place, silver medalist(s)	Svetlana Usovich	Belarus	50.55	NR
3rd place, bronze medalist(s)	Irina Rosikhina	Russia	52.05	
4	Ilona Usovich	Belarus	52.06	PB
5	Natalya Pygyda	Ukraine	52.63	
6	Monika Bejnar	Poland	52.63	PB
