= Amersham School =

Location
- Stanley Hill Avenue; Amersham, Buckinghamshire; England; 51.6674°N 0.5936°W

Information
- Type: Academy
- Motto: Live, Learn and Succeed Together
- Established: 1964
- Department for Education URN: 137343 Tables
- Ofsted: Reports
- Chairman of Governors: Nigel Davies
- Headteacher: Sharon Jarrett
- Gender: Co-educational
- Age: 11 to 18
- Enrolment: 825
- Houses: Delta; Zeta; Omega; Beta; Sigma; Kappa
- Website: http://www.amersham.bucks.sch.uk/

Amersham School is a mixed secondary school in Amersham, Buckinghamshire. In September 2011, the school became an Academy. It takes children from the age of 11 through to the age of 18 and has approximately 1020 pupils.

In September 2005, the school was designated by the Department for Education and Skills (DfES) as a specialist school in Business & Enterprise.

Amersham School is an upper school, and half the children who live locally pass the 11+ and go to grammar schools. In light of this data, Amersham School is performing well below national averages.

As is common with many other schools, Amersham School operates a two-year Key Stage 3. This allows three years for GCSE study, through a staged approach, and allows for a more personalized curriculum including a variety of qualifications on offer, generally good to suit mixed ability students.

The school is over-subscribed for entries in Year 7. From September 2021, Year 7 has 7 forms, as opposed to 5 forms in Year 12 and Year 13, and six forms in the remainder of the school, and has a relatively large sixth form.

== History ==
The school opened on its current site in 1964, although at that time it was the Brudenell County Secondary School for girls. Following the opening of the girls' school, the Raans County Secondary School, which had opened in 1956 as a mixed school, became a boys' school. In 1988, Raans Secondary School merged with Brudenell School, to become the Amersham School. Notable alumni include Olympic Athlete Nicola Sanders.

== Academic results ==
The examination results at Amersham School have risen dramatically in recent years, with 70% of pupils achieving at least five GCSEs at grades A*-C in 2010. 50% of pupils achieved five GCSEs at grades A*-C including English and Mathematics. A Level and BTEC results are also at an all-time high, with a 42% pass rate and 10% of grades at A-C.

The school's 2016 GCSE results had a Progress 8 score of 0.27, which is above the national average for schools in England, and 79% of pupils earned A*-C grades in GCSE English and Maths. The 2016 A-Level results were in line with the national average, with a progress score of −0.22 and an average grade of E+. Amersham School qualifies for some university admissions to be contextual.
