= Sergey Kasnauskas =

Sergey Kasnauskas (Belarusian: Сяргей Каснаускас; born 20 April 1961) is a Belarusian former track and field athlete who competed in the shot put for the Soviet Union. As of 2016, he places within the world top 25 all-time for the event.

He was a bronze medallist at the 1979 European Athletics Junior Championships behind future world medallist Remigius Machura.

Kasnauskas's foremost achievements came in the 1984 season. He won at the Soviet Indoor Athletics Championships that year with a championship record throw of 21.46 m (70 ft 4 3/4 in) – a mark which went unsurpassed. This moved him to fourth on the all-time indoor lists at that point, behind Americans George Woods, Brian Oldfield, Terry Albritton and Kevin Akins.

Outdoors, he achieved a lifetime best of 22.09 m (72 ft 5 1/2 in). This was a Soviet record and brought him to third on the all-time lists behind Oldfield and Udo Beyer. He ranked second in the world for 1984 behind Oldfield. He was the gold medallist in the shot put at the Friendship Games – an Olympic alternative to boycotting nations.

His outdoor mark is still the Belarusian national record until 2011, when it was beaten by one centimetre by Andrey Mikhnevich, but his record was then reinstated because of Mikhnevich doping.

== International competitions ==
Year	Competition	Venue	Position	Event	Notes
1979	European Junior Championships	Bydgoszcz, Poland	3rd	Shot put	18.03 m
1984	Friendship Games	Moscow, Soviet Union	1st	Shot put	21.64 m
