= Korinna Fink =

German sprinter

Korinna Fink (born 6 April 1981 in Teterow) is a German sprinter who specializes in the 400 metres.

She finished sixth in 4 x 400 m relay at the 2005 World Championships, together with teammates Claudia Marx, Claudia Hoffman and Ulrike Urbansky and fifth at the 2006 European Championships with Hoffmann, Anja Pollmächer and Marx.

Her personal best time is 52.31 seconds, achieved in June 2006 in Regensburg.

She has competed for the sports clubs SC Magdeburg (-2004) and LG Eintracht Frankfurt (2005-present).
