= Jolanta Kajtoch =

Polish sprinter

Personal information
- Nationality: Poland
- Born: Jolanta Wójcik; 2 June 1984 (age 42) Lipinki, Świecie County, Poland
- Height: 1.70 m (5 ft 7 in)
- Weight: 60 kg (132 lb)

Sport
- Sport: Athletics
- Event: 4 × 400 metres relay
- Club: ULKS Technik Trzcinica

Achievements and titles
- Personal best: 400 m: 52.52 s (2008)

Jolanta Kajtoch (née Wójcik; born 2 June 1984 in Lipinki, Świecie County) is a Polish sprinter, who specialized in the 400 metres. Wojcik competed for the women's 4 × 400 m relay at the 2008 Summer Olympics in Beijing, along with her teammates Grażyna Prokopek, Anna Jesień, and Monika Bejnar. She ran on the second leg of the first heat, with an individual-split time of 51.72 seconds. Wojcik and her team finished the relay in sixth place for a total time of 3:28.23, failing to advance into the final.
