= 2004 IAAF World Indoor Championships – Women's 400 metres =

The Women's 400 metres event at the 2004 IAAF World Indoor Championships was held on March 5–6.

== Medalists ==
Gold	Silver	Bronze
Natalya Nazarova; Russia	Olesya Forsheva; Russia	Tonique Williams-Darling; Bahamas

== Results ==
=== Heat ===
First 2 of each heat (Q) and next 4 fastest (q) qualified for the semifinals.

Rank	Heat	Name	Nationality	Time	Notes
1	1	Tonique Williams-Darling	Bahamas	51.76	Q, PB
2	2	Fani Chalkia	Greece	51.77	Q, NR
2	4	Natalya Nazarova	Russia	51.77	Q
4	1	Ionela Târlea	Romania	52.00	Q
5	3	Olesya Forsheva	Russia	52.17	Q
6	2	Catherine Murphy	Great Britain	52.18	Q, SB
7	2	Sviatlana Usovich	Belarus	52.19	q
8	1	Helen Karagounis	Great Britain	52.66	q, PB
9	3	Julian Clay	United States	53.04	Q
10	4	Hrisoula Goudenoudi	Greece	53.09	Q
11	4	Grażyna Prokopek	Poland	53.16	q
12	2	Mireille Nguimgo	Cameroon	53.17	q
13	3	Ronetta Smith	Jamaica	53.39	
14	1	Androula Sialou	Cyprus	53.62	
15	2	Virginia Johnson	United States	53.71	
16	1	Sandrine Thiébaud-Kangni	Togo	53.72	SB
17	2	Barbara Petráhn	Hungary	53.78	SB
18	3	Beatrice Dahlgren	Sweden	53.90	
19	1	Joanne Cuddihy	Ireland	54.02	
20	4	Michelle Burgher	Jamaica	54.18	
21	3	Roqaya Al-Gassra	Bahrain	54.24	NR
22	3	Karen Shinkins	Ireland	54.37	
23	4	Klodiana Shala	Albania	54.62	
24	4	Carmo Tavares	Portugal	54.79	

=== Semifinals ===
First 3 of each semifinal (Q) qualified for the final.

Rank	Heat	Name	Nationality	Time	Notes
1	2	Natalya Nazarova	Russia	50.91	Q
2	1	Olesya Forsheva	Russia	51.53	Q
3	2	Fani Chalkia	Greece	51.68	Q, NR
4	1	Tonique Williams-Darling	Bahamas	51.85	Q
5	1	Ionela Târlea	Romania	51.95	Q
6	1	Sviatlana Usovich	Belarus	52.21	
7	2	Julian Clay	United States	52.35	Q, PB
8	1	Helen Karagounis	Great Britain	52.53	PB
9	2	Catherine Murphy	Great Britain	52.59	
10	2	Grażyna Prokopek	Poland	52.60	
11	1	Hrisoula Goudenoudi	Greece	52.84	
12	2	Mireille Nguimgo	Cameroon	53.22	

=== Final ===
Rank	Name	Nationality	Time	Notes
1st place, gold medalist(s)	Natalya Nazarova	Russia	50.19	CR
2nd place, silver medalist(s)	Olesya Forsheva	Russia	50.65	PB
3rd place, bronze medalist(s)	Tonique Williams-Darling	Bahamas	50.87	NR
4	Ionela Târlea	Romania	51.58	SB
5	Julian Clay	United States	52.82	
6	Fani Chalkia	Greece	52.90	
