= 2002 European Athletics Championships – Women's 400 metres =

Women's 400 metres at the European Athletics Championships
- Venue: Olympic Stadium
- Location: Munich, Germany
- Dates: 6–8 August 2002
- Winning time: 50.45 s

Medalists
gold medal	Olesya Zykina	Russia
silver medal	Grit Breuer	Germany
bronze medal	Lee McConnell	Great Britain

The women's 400 metres at the 2002 European Athletics Championships were held at the Olympic Stadium on August 6–8.

== Results ==
=== Heats ===
Qualification: First 2 of each heat (Q) and the next 2 fastest qualified for the final.

Rank	Heat	Name	Nationality	Time	Notes
1	1	Olesya Zykina	Russia	50.47	Q
2	3	Grit Breuer	Germany	50.98	Q
3	3	Lee McConnell	Great Britain	51.24	Q
4	3	Anastasiya Kapachinskaya	Russia	51.56	q
5	2	Antonina Yefremova	Ukraine	51.96	Q
6	2	Grażyna Prokopek	Poland	52.01	Q
7	1	Birgit Rockmeier	Germany	52.28	Q
8	3	Sviatlana Usovich	Belarus	52.33	q
9	1	Danielle Perpoli	Italy	52.34	
10	2	Claudia Marx	Germany	52.42	
11	1	Karen Shinkins	Ireland	52.50	
12	2	Tatyana Levina	Russia	52.56	
13	3	Olga Mishchenko	Ukraine	52.62	
14	1	Hrisoula Goudenoudi	Greece	52.63	
15	2	Barbara Petráhn	Hungary	52.72	
16	3	Lena Udd	Sweden	53.26	
17	2	Otilia Ruicu	Romania	53.35	
18	2	Zana Minina	Lithuania	53.50	
19	1	Jovana Miljković	Yugoslavia	53.72	
20	3	Klodiana Shala	Albania	55.81	
	1	Catherine Murphy	Great Britain	DNF	

=== Final ===
Rank	Name	Nationality	Time	Notes
1st place, gold medalist(s)	Olesya Zykina	Russia	50.45	EL
2nd place, silver medalist(s)	Grit Breuer	Germany	50.70	SB
3rd place, bronze medalist(s)	Lee McConnell	Great Britain	51.02	PB
4	Grażyna Prokopek	Poland	51.53	
5	Anastasiya Kapachinskaya	Russia	51.69	
6	Antonina Yefremova	Ukraine	52.02	
7	Sviatlana Usovich	Belarus	52.10	
8	Birgit Rockmeier	Germany	52.91	
