= 2002 European Athletics Indoor Championships – Women's 4 × 400 metres relay =

The women's 4 × 400 metres relay event at the 2002 European Athletics Indoor Championships was held on March 3, 2002.

== Results ==
Rank	Lane	Team	Athlete	Time	Notes
1st place, gold medalist(s)	3	Belarus	Yekaterina Stankevich; Iryna Khliustava; Anna Kozak; Sviatlana Usovich	3:32.24	
2nd place, silver medalist(s)	5	Poland	Anna Pacholak; Aneta Lemiesz; Anna Zagórska; Grażyna Prokopek	3:32.45	
3rd place, bronze medalist(s)	6	Italy	Daniela Reina; Patrizia Spuri; Carla Barbarino; Danielle Perpoli	3:36.49	
4	4	Austria	Sabine Gasselseder; Eva-Maria Schöftner; Sabine Mick; Brigitte Mühlbacher	3:42.24	NR
