= Nadia Vigliano =

French javelin thrower

Personal information
- Nationality: France
- Born: 24 June 1977 (age 48) Creil

Sport
- Event: Javelin Throw

Nadia Vigliano (born 24 June 1977 in Creil) is a French athlete, who specialises in the javelin.

== Biography ==
She won four French javelin championship titles in 2007, 2008, 2009 and 2011.

Her personal best, thrown on 8 June 2008 at Draguignan, is 57.31 metres.

=== Prize list ===
- French Championships in Athletics:
  - winner in the javelin 2007, 2008, 2009 and 2011

=== Records ===
personal records
Event	Performance	Location	Date
Javelin	57.31 m	Draguignan	8 June 2008
