= Wang Jinping (sprinter) =

Chinese sprinter

Wang Jinping (Chinese: 王金萍, born 7 March 1987, in Heilongjiang) is a female Chinese athletics sprinter, who represented her country at the 4 × 400 m relay event at the 2008 Summer Olympics.

== Personal best ==
- 2008 Asian Grand Prix - 2nd 4x400 relay
