= Grażyna Prokopek =

Polish sprinter

Personal information
- Nationality: Polish
- Born: 20 April 1977 (age 49) Zalewo, Poland
- Died: Poland
- Height: 1.68 m (5 ft 6 in)
- Weight: 56 kg (123 lb)

Sport
- Sport: Athletics
- Events: 400 m hurdles, 400m
- Club: AZS AWFiS Gdańsk
Medal record
Women's athletics
Representing Poland
European Championships
Bronze medal – third place	2002 Munich	4 x 400 m relay
Bronze medal – third place	2006 Gothenburg	4 x 400 m relay
European Indoor Championships
Silver medal – second place	2002 Vienna	4 x 400 m relay

Grażyna Prokopek-Janáček (born 20 April 1977) is a Polish retired sprinter who specialized in the 400 metres.

She is married to a Czech former pole vaulter, Štěpán Janáček.

== International competitions ==
Year	Competition	Venue	Position	Event	Notes
Representing Poland
1999	European U23 Championships	Gothenburg, Sweden	3rd	400 m	52.28
1999	European U23 Championships	Gothenburg, Sweden	4th	4 × 400 m relay	3:33.28
2001	World Championships	Edmonton, Canada	22nd (sf)	400 m	52.28
2001	World Championships	Edmonton, Canada	7th	4 × 400 m relay	3:27.78
2002	European Indoor Championships	Vienna, Austria	8th (h)	400 m	52.86
2002	European Indoor Championships	Vienna, Austria	2nd	4 × 400 m relay	3:32.45
2002	European Championships	Munich, Germany	4th	400 m	51.53
2002	European Championships	Munich, Germany	3rd	4 × 400 m relay	3:26.15
2002	World Cup	Madrid, Spain	5th	4 × 400 m relay	3:29.21^{1}
2003	World Indoor Championships	Birmingham, United Kingdom	9th (sf)	400 m	53.07
2003	World Championships	Paris, France	18th (sf)	400 m	51.89
2003	World Championships	Paris, France	5th	4 × 400 m relay	3:26.64
2004	World Indoor Championships	Budapest, Hungary	10th (sf)	400 m	52.60
2004	World Indoor Championships	Budapest, Hungary	4th	4 × 400 m relay,	3:30.52
2004	Olympic Games	Athens, Greece	21st (sf)	400 m	51.96
2004	Olympic Games	Athens, Greece	5th	4 × 400 m relay	3:25.22
2005	World Championships	Helsinki, Finland	27th (sf)	400 m	52.39
2005	World Championships	Helsinki, Finland	4th	4 × 400 m relay	3:24.49 NR
2005	Universiade	İzmir, Turkey	6th	200 m	23.79
2005	Universiade	İzmir, Turkey	2nd	4 × 400 m relay	3:27.71
2006	World Indoor Championships	Moscow, Russia	12th (sf)	400 m	53.64
2006	World Indoor Championships	Moscow, Russia	4th	4 × 400 m relay	3:28.95 NRi
2006	European Championships	Gothenburg, Sweden	14th (sf)	400 m	52.66
2006	European Championships	Gothenburg, Sweden	3rd	4 × 400 m relay	3:27.77
2006	World Cup	Athens, Greece	8th	400 m	53.29
2006	World Cup	Athens, Greece	5th	4 × 400 m relay	3:27.22
2007	European Indoor Championships	Birmingham, United Kingdom	6th	400 m	52.86
2007	European Indoor Championships	Birmingham, United Kingdom	4th	4 × 400 m relay	3:30.31
2007	World Championships	Osaka, Japan	6th	4 × 400 m relay	3:26.49
2008	Olympic Games	Beijing, China	9th (h)	4 × 400 m relay	3:28.23

^{1}Representing Europe

=== Personal bests ===
Outdoor

- 100 metres – 11.67 (Bydgoszcz 1999)
- 200 metres – 23.22 (Bydgoszcz 2004)
- 400 metres – 51.29 (Athens 2004)
- 800 metres – 2:08.31 (Suwałki 1999)

Indoor

- 60 metres – 7.57 (Prague 2006)
- 200 metres – 23.94 (Spała 2004)
- 400 metres – 52.00 (Birmingham 2007)

== See also ==
- Polish records in athletics
