= Andreas Anastasopoulos =

Greek shot putter

Andreás Anastasópoulos
Personal information
- Full name: Andreás Anastasópoulos
- Born: 2 April 1976 (age 50) Nikaia, Attica, Greece
- Height: 1.87
- Weight: 120 kg (265 lb)

Sport
- Sport: Shot put

Achievements and titles
- Personal best: shot put - 20.19 (2008)
- Updated on 25 June 2010

Andreas Anastasopoulos (born April 2, 1976) is a Greek track and field athlete in the shot put. From October 23, 2001 to October 22, 2003 he was suspended by the IAAF.

== Achievements ==
- National Championships: (1st, shot put)

== See also ==
- List of sportspeople sanctioned for doping offences
