= Agnieszka Karpiesiuk =

Polish sprinter and hurdler

Agnieszka Karpiesiuk (born April 17, 1982) is a Polish athlete, a sprinter, who also competes in the 400 metres hurdles. Karpiesiuk, who represents AZS Gdańsk, was a member of the Polish Team in the 2008 Olympic Games in Beijing. She is the 400-meter indoor champion of Poland (2008), and was a finalist of the 2007 European Indoor Athletics Championships (4 × 400 m) as well as the 2008 IAAF World Indoor Championships.
