= Anna Kozak =

Belarusian sprinter

Personal information
- Full name: Anna Kozak
- Nationality: Belarus
- Born: 22 June 1974 (age 52) Novolukoml, BSSR, USSR, now Belarus
- Height: 1.72 m (5 ft 8 in)
- Weight: 56 kg (123 lb)

Sport
- Country: Belarus
- Sport: Athletics

Achievements and titles
- Personal bests: 400m (50.94s) (Madrid 1996); 300m(indoor) (37.40s) (Mogilev 2006)
Medal record
Olympic Games
Bronze medal – third place	2008 Beijing	4×400 m relay
World Indoor Championships
Silver medal – second place	2004 Budapest	4×400 m relay
Bronze medal – third place	2006 Moscow	4×400 m relay
Silver medal – second place	2008 Valencia	4×400 m relay
European Championships
Silver medal – second place	2006 Gothenburg	4x400 m relay
European Indoor Championships
Gold medal – first place	2002 Wienna	4x400 m relay

Anna Kozak (Belarusian: Ганна Казак; born 22 June 1974) is a Belarusian sprinter.

Together with Natallia Salahub, Ilona Usovich and Sviatlana Usovich she won a silver medal in 4 x 400 metres relay at the 2004 IAAF World Indoor Championships. For the 2006 IAAF World Indoor Championships, the Belarusian team had substituted Svetlana Usovich with Yulyana Zhalniaruk, and won a bronze medal.
