= Nicola Sanders =

British sprinter (born 1982)

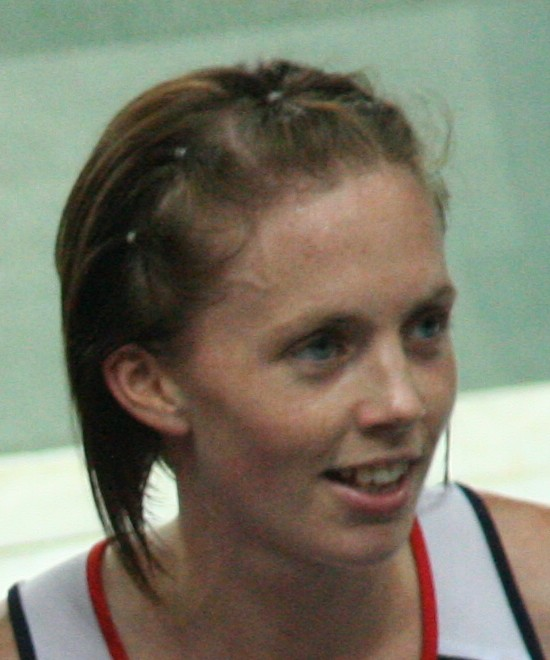
- Nicola Sanders in Osaka 2007

Personal information
- Born: 23 June 1982 (age 44) High Wycombe, England

Sport
- Club: Windsor, Slough, Eton and Hounslow Athletic Club; Milton Keynes AC
- Turned pro: 2004
- Retired: 28 October 2014

Achievements and titles
- Highest world ranking: 400 m: 3 (2007)
- Personal bests: 400 m: 49.65 (2007); 400 m hurdles: 55.32 (2006); Indoors; 400 m: 50.02i NR (2007)
Medal record
Women's athletics
Representing Great Britain
Olympic Games
Bronze medal – third place	2008 Beijing	4 × 400 m relay
World Championships
Silver medal – second place	2007 Osaka	400 m
Bronze medal – third place	2005 Helsinki	4 × 400 m relay
Bronze medal – third place	2007 Osaka	4 × 400 m relay
Bronze medal – third place	2009 Berlin	4 × 400 m relay
Bronze medal – third place	2011 Daegu	4 × 400 m relay
World Indoor Championships
Gold medal – first place	2012 Istanbul	4 × 400 m relay
European Championships
Silver medal – second place	2010 Barcelona	4 × 400 m relay
European Indoor Championships
Gold medal – first place	2007 Birmingham	400 m
Bronze medal – third place	2007 Birmingham	4 × 400 m relay
European Junior Championships
Bronze medal – third place	1999 Riga	400 m hurdles
- Updated on 27 June 2008

Nicola Clare Sanders (born 23 June 1982) is a former British track and field sprinter. She began her career as a 400 metres hurdles specialist before concentrating on the 400 metres from 2006 onwards. Her outdoor 400 metres personal best is 49.65 seconds. She holds the British indoor record with 50.02 seconds, which ranks her as the fifth fastest woman of all-time indoors.

Sanders' senior international career ran from around 2006 until 2014, and peaked in 2007 when she won the 400 metres at the 2007 European Indoor Championships (breaking the British Indoor record), at the British Athletics Championships and then ran a personal outdoor best to win the silver medal at the 2007 World Championships behind compatriot Christine Ohuruogu.

However her progress after 2007 was repeatedly hampered by injuries and after 2007 she did not feature again at the highest level of international individual competition, with all of her subsequent success being in the relay squads. In the 4 × 400 metres relay, she won a bronze medal at the 2008 Beijing Olympics (retroactively awarded in 2017), she won four World Championship relay bronzes in four consecutive championships from 2005 to 2011 and a relay gold medal at the 2012 World Indoor Championships, her final major international honour.

After two years of struggling with injury, she announced her retirement from athletics in October 2014, aged 32.

== Early achievements ==
Sanders won a bronze medal in the 1999 European Athletics Junior Championships in Riga at 400 m hurdles. That same year she was 4th in the 400 m hurdles at the World Youth Championships. In 2000, she was 5th in the 2000 World Junior Championships in Athletics, but won gold in the Commonwealth Youth Championships. She grew up in Amersham and went to Amersham School.

== 2005 to 2006 ==
In 2005, she finished 6th (4th 4 × 400 m relay) at the World Student Games.

In the 2005 Helsinki World Championships Sanders reached the semi-finals. Together with Lee McConnell, Donna Fraser and Christine Ohuruogu she won a bronze medal in the 4 × 400 m relay.

She was 4th in the Commonwealth Games of 2006 in the 400 m hurdles and was part of the team that won the 4 × 400 m relay, but they were subsequently disqualified.

Since then she has focused on 400 m (due to injury issues) and rarely participates in hurdles races.

She finished sixth in the 400 metres final at the 2006 European Athletics Championships in Gothenburg.

Also in 2006, Sanders won the women's 400 metres at the AAA Championships by a massive 2.72 seconds. As of July 2024, this is the greatest winning margin for the women's 400 metres at these championships since 1990 and the only time since 1990 that this event has been won by more than two seconds.

== 2007 to 2008 ==
In 2007, she took gold in the 400 m competition in the 2007 European Athletics Indoor Championships in Birmingham, with a personal best and national record of 50.02 seconds. This was the 5th fastest indoor 400 m time in history. She also won a bronze in the 4 × 400 m relay.

In 2007, she had suffered knee and Achilles tendon problems, but on 27 August 2007 Nicola broke 50 seconds for the first time in her career, recording 49.77 seconds in the semi-final of the 400 m at the World Athletics Championships in Osaka, Japan to move to #3 on the British all-time list. She then went on to finish 2nd in the final, behind fellow Briton, Christine Ohuruogu. Sanders set another personal best of 49.65, which puts her as the fourth fastest British athlete over 400 m, after Kathy Cook, Katharine Merry and Ohuruogu, who also set a personal best in the World Championship final.

During the final day of the championships on 2 September, Sanders anchored the British 4 × 400 m team to a bronze medal. In so doing she became the first female UK runner to break 49 seconds for a 400 metres relay leg, with a time of 48.76 seconds, beating Sally Gunnell's previous record of 49.46 seconds.

Sanders went out of the 400 m at the 2008 Summer Olympics in the third semi-final in a time of 50.71 seconds. With a tough lane draw, lane 9, and lacking the fitness that comes from an injury free run in to the season, Michael Johnson added, 'she's got a little bit more 800 metres look to me this year than she did last year, there's just not the power, the arm drive that we saw in 2007.' She was part of the 4 × 400 m relay team which finished fifth in the final although the team was later upgraded to bronze medal position following disqualification for doping offences of the teams finishing in second and fourth place.

== Charity ==
In December 2011, Sanders was one of 12 British female sporting celebrities who posed for Clara Maidment a charity calendar in aid of Wellbeing of Women.

== Personal bests ==
Outdoors:

- 400 metres – 49.65 (Osaka, Japan 2007)
- 400 metres hurdles – 55.32 (Melbourne, Australia 2006)

Indoors:

- 400 metres – 50.02 (Birmingham, England 2007) NR
