= Oksana Ilyushkina =

Ukrainian middle-distance runner

Oksana Ilyushkina (née Kochetkova; born 25 May 1974) is a retired Ukrainian athlete who specialized in the 400 metres and 800 metres.

In the 4 x 400 metres relay she finished fourth at the 2005 European Indoor Championships, fifth at the 2005 World Championships, and sixth at the 2006 European Championships. She also competed at the 2004 Olympic Games without reaching the final, and on the 2007 European Indoor Championships team that was disqualified.

Her personal best times are 51.60 seconds in the 400 metres, achieved in August 2004 in Kyiv; 57.47 seconds in the 400 metres hurdles, achieved in June 2005 in Mykolaiv; and 2:01.67 minutes in the 800 metres, achieved in June 2002 in Donetsk.
