= Efthimios Papadopoulos =

Greek middle-distance runner

Efthimios Papadopoulos (Greek: Ευθύμιος Παπαδόπουλος; born 29 April 1983) is a Greek middle-distance runner who specializes in the 800 metres.

He finished ninth at the 2006 IAAF World Cup. He also competed at the 2006 European Championships without reaching the final.

His personal best time is 1:46.56 minutes, achieved in July 2006 in Athens. This ranks him third on the Greek all-time list, only behind Panagiotis Stroubakos and Sotirios Moutsanas.
