= Emma Duck =

British international track athlete

Emma Duck (born 9 February 1981) was a British international track athlete known for the 400 metres and the 400 metre hurdles.

== Track career ==
Her personal best in the 400 indoors is 52.62 seconds whilst outdoor it is 52.84 seconds.

In the 2006 season, Duck won a bronze medal in the AAA Indoor Championships in the 400 metres and selection for the 4x400 metres team in the 2006 European Championships in Athletics. She was disqualified in the final of the AAA Outdoor Championships.

She was injured for the 2007 AAA Outdoor Championships. In 2007, she won silver in the 400 metres in the AAA Indoors. She was selected for both the individual and team 400 metres for the 2007 European Athletics Indoor Championships, winner a bronze in the latter. In 2007, she was ranked 7th in 400 metres and 5th in 400 metre hurdles. 2008 saw her finish 7th in her heat and drop to 112th in the 400m rankings.

Duck took part in no competitive races in 2009 or 2010.
