= Kseniya Karandyuk =

Ukrainian sprinter

Kseniya Karandyuk (born 21 June 1986) is a Ukrainian sprinter who specializes in the 400 metres.

In the 4 x 400 metres relay she finished sixth at the 2006 European Championships. She also competed at the 2008 Olympic relay team that failed to reach the final, and the 2007 European Indoor Championships team that was disqualified.

Her personal best times are 23.71 seconds in the 200 metres, achieved in May 2006 in Yalta; and 52.19 seconds in the 400 metres, achieved in July 2006 in Kyiv.
