= Oksana Shcherbak =

Ukrainian sprinter

Medal record

Women's athletics

Summer Universiade
| Gold medal – first place | 2007 Bangkok | 4x400 m relay |

Oksana Shcherbak, née Holodkova (Ukrainian: Оксана Щербак, born 24 February 1982) is a Ukrainian sprint athlete who specializes in the 400 metres.

She was born in Pyriatyn, and represents the club Kolos Poltava. In individual competition she competed in the 2007 World Championships without reaching the final. In the 4 x 400 metres relay she finished sixth at the 2006 European Championships, and won a gold medal at the 2007 Summer Universiade. She also competed at the 2007 World Championships. At the 2008 Summer Olympics she competed in both 4 x 100 and 4 x 400. The 4 x 100 metres relay team was disqualified in the first round, whereas the 4 x 400 metres team was knocked out.

Her personal best time is 51.23 seconds in the 400 metres, achieved in July 2006 in Kyiv. She also has 7.39 seconds in the 60 metres (indoor), achieved in February 2008 in Sumy; 11.81 seconds in the 100 metres, achieved in May 2007 in Bar; and 23.39 seconds in the 200 metres, achieved in June 2008 at Florø Stadion.
