= Claudia Hoffmann =

German sprinter (born 1982)

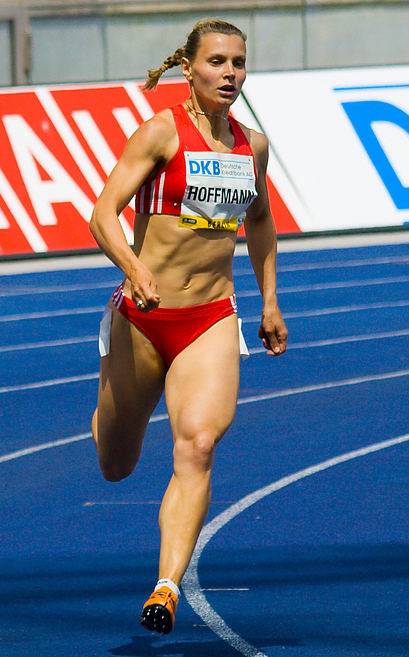
Claudia Hoffmann

Claudia Hoffmann (born 10 December 1982 in Nauen) is a German sprinter who specialises in the 400 metres. She represents SC Potsdam and trains under Frank Möller.

Her personal best time is 51.65 seconds, achieved in June 2010 in Regensburg.

== Achievements ==
Year	Competition	Venue	Position	Event	Notes
Representing Germany
2000	World Junior Championships	Santiago, Chile	5th	4 × 400 m relay	3:36.70
2001	European Junior Championships	Grosseto, Italy	4th	400 m	53,81
2003	European U23 Championships	Bydgoszcz, Poland	6th	400m	52.81
2003	European U23 Championships	Bydgoszcz, Poland	3rd	4 × 400 m relay	3:33.59
2005	World Championships	Helsinki, Finland	6th	4 × 400 m relay	3:28.39
2006	European Championships	Gothenburg, Sweden	5th	4 × 400 m relay	3:28.18
2007	European Indoor Championships	Birmingham, United Kingdom	5th	4 × 400 m relay	3:32.46
2010	European Championships	Barcelona, Spain	1st	4 × 400 m relay	3:24.07
