= Sviatlana Usovich =

Belarusian sprinter

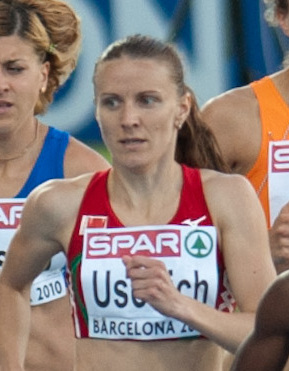
- at 2010 European Championships

Personal information
- Born: October 14, 1980 (age 45)
- Height: 1.65 m (5 ft 5 in)
- Weight: 54 kg (119 lb)

Sport
- Country: Belarus
- Sport: Athletics
- Events: 400 m, 800 m
Medal record
World Indoor Championships
Silver medal – second place	2004 Budapest	4 × 400 m relay
Silver medal – second place	2008 Valencia	4 × 400 m relay
European Championships
Silver medal – second place	2006 Gothenburg	4 × 400 m relay
European Indoor Championships
Gold medal – first place	2002 Wienna	4 × 400 m relay
Gold medal – first place	2007 Birmingham	4 × 400 m relay
Silver medal – second place	2005 Madrid	400 m

Sviatlana Usovich (Belarusian: Святлана Вусовіч; born 14 October 1980) is a Belarusian sprinter who specializes in the 400 metres. Her younger sister, Ilona, is also an athlete.

On 25 November 2016 the IOC disqualified her (and her relay team) from the 2008 Olympic Games and struck her results from the record for failing a drugs test in a re-analysis of her doping sample from 2008.

== Competition record ==
Year	Competition	Venue	Position	Event	Notes
2001	World Championships	Edmonton, Canada	10th (h)	4 × 400 m relay	3:28.93
2001	Universiade	Beijing, China	3rd	4 × 400 m relay	3:30.65
2002	European Indoor Championships	Vienna, Austria	7th (h)	400 m	52.59
2002	European Indoor Championships	Vienna, Austria	1st	4 × 400 m relay	3:32.24
2002	European Championships	Munich, Germany	7th	400 m	52.10
2002	European Championships	Munich, Germany	6th	4 × 400 m relay	3:32.46
2003	World Indoor Championships	Birmingham, United Kingdom	6th	400 m	52.72
2003	World Championships	Paris, France	14th (sf)	400 m	51.46
2003	World Championships	Paris, France	13th (h)	4 × 400 m relay	3:31.40
2004	World Indoor Championships	Budapest, Hungary	6th	400 m	52.21
2004	World Indoor Championships	Budapest, Hungary	2nd	4 × 400 m relay	3:29.96
2004	Olympic Games	Athens, Greece	14th (sf)	400 m	51.42
2004	Olympic Games	Athens, Greece	9th (h)	4 × 400 m relay	3:27.38
2005	European Indoor Championships	Madrid, Spain	2nd	400 m	50.55
2005	World Championships	Helsinki, Finland	21st (sf)	800 m	2:02.34
2006	European Championships	Gothenburg, Sweden	2nd	4 × 400 m relay	3:27.69
2007	European Indoor Championships	Birmingham, United Kingdom	1st	4 × 400 m relay	3:27.83
2007	World Championships	Osaka, Japan	6th	800 m	1:58.92
2007	World Championships	Osaka, Japan	5th	4 × 400 m relay	3:21.88
2008	World Indoor Championships	Valencia, Spain	2nd	4 × 400 m relay	3:28.90
2008	Olympic Games	Beijing, China	DSQ	800 m	2:02.79
2008	Olympic Games	Beijing, China	DSQ	4 × 400 m relay	3:21.85
2010	European Championships	Barcelona, Spain	DSQ	800 m	2:02.74
2010	European Championships	Barcelona, Spain	DSQ	4 × 400 m relay	3:28.74
2011	World Championships	Daegu, South Korea	33rd (h)	800 m	2:05.62
2011	World Championships	Daegu, South Korea	6th	4 × 400 m relay	3:25.64
2012	World Indoor Championships	Istanbul, Turkey	5th	4 × 400 m relay	3:33.73

=== Personal bests ===
- 400 metres - 50.79 s (2004)
- 800 metres - 1:58.11 min (2007)
