= Anja Pollmächer =

German sprinter

Anja Pollmächer (born 29 July 1985 in Riesa) is a German sprinter who specializes in the 400 metres.

Pollmächer's personal best time is 52.90 seconds, achieved in July 2006 in Ulm. She finished fourth in 4 × 400 m relay at the 2004 World Junior Championships and fifth at the 2006 European Championships.

She competes for the sports club LAC Erdgas Chemnitz and is the younger sister of André Pollmächer.
