= Yulyana Yushchanka =

Belarusian sprinter

Personal information
- Nationality: Belarusian
- Born: August 14, 1984 (age 41)

Sport
- Sport: Track and field
- Event: 400 metres

Achievements and titles
- Personal best: 400 m: 51.01 (2007)
Medal record
Women's Athletics
Representing Belarus
World Indoor Championships
| Bronze medal – third place | 2006 Moscow | 4 × 400 m relay |
European Championships
| Silver medal – second place | 2006 Gothenburg | 4 × 400 m relay |
European Indoor Championships
| Gold medal – first place | 2007 Birmingham | 4 × 400 m relay |

Yulyana Yushchanka (Belarusian: Юльяна Юшчанка, née Жалнярук, Zhalniaruk; born 14 August 1984) is a Belarusian sprinter who specializes in the 400 metres.

In 2006 Zhalniaruk won a bronze medal in the 4 × 400 metres relay at the World Indoor Championships (with teammates Natallia Solohub, Anna Kozak and Ilona Usovich). She also won a silver medal at the European Championships (with Sviatlana Usovich, Kozak and I. Usovich).

Her personal best for the 400 metres is 51.01 seconds, achieved in August 2007 in Minsk.
