= Iryna Khliustava =

Belarusian sprinter

Personal information
- Born: June 14, 1978 (age 48)
- Height: 1.72 m (5 ft 7 1/2 in)
- Weight: 57 kg (126 lb)

Sport
- Country: Belarus
- Sport: Athletics
- Events: 400 m, 800 m
Medal record
Olympic Games
Disqualified	2008 Beijing	4 × 400 m relay
European Championships
Silver medal – second place	2006 Gothenburg	4 × 400 m relay
European Indoor Championships
Gold medal – first place	2002 Wienna	4 × 400 m relay

Iryna Mikalayeuna Khliustava (Belarusian: Ірына Мікалаеўна Хлюстава; Russian: Ирина Николаевна Хлюстова; born 25 August 1978, in Luninets) is a Belarusian sprinter. She competed in the 4 × 400 m relay event at the 2000, 2004, 2008 and 2012 Summer Olympics.
