= 2007 European Athletics Indoor Championships =

- Dates: 2 – 4 March
- Host city: Birmingham; United Kingdom
- Venue: National Indoor Arena
- Events: 26
- Participation: 519 athletes from 47 nations

The 2007 European Athletics Indoor Championships were held in the National Indoor Arena (NIA) in Birmingham, England, from Friday, 2 March to Sunday, 4 March 2007. Birmingham also held the 2003 IAAF World Indoor Championships.

== Men's results ==
=== Track ===
Event	Gold		Silver		Bronze	
60 m	Jason Gardener; Great Britain	6.51; EL	Craig Pickering; Great Britain	6.59	Ronald Pognon; France	6.60
400 m	David Gillick; Ireland	45.52; NR EL	Bastian Swillims; Germany	45.62; PB	Robert Tobin; Great Britain	46.15
800 m	Arnoud Okken; Netherlands	1:47.92	Miguel Quesada; Spain	1:47.96	Maurizio Bobbato; Italy	1:48:71; PB
1500 m	Juan Carlos Higuero; Spain	3:44.41	Sergio Gallardo; Spain	3:44.51	Arturo Casado; Spain	3:44.73
3000 m	Cosimo Caliandro; Italy	8:02.44	Bouabdellah Tahri; France	8:02.85	Jesús España; Spain	8:02.91
60 m hurdles	Gregory Sedoc; Netherlands	7.63 =PB	Marcel van der Westen; Netherlands	7.64	Jackson Quiñónez; Spain	7.65
4 × 400 m	Great Britain; Robert Tobin; Dale Garland; Philip Taylor; Steven Green	3:07.04	Russia; Ivan Buzolin; Vladislav Frolov; Maksim Dyldin; Artem Sergeyenkov	3:08.10	Poland; Piotr Kędzia; Marcin Marciniszyn; Łukasz Pryga; Piotr Klimczak	3:08.14
4 × 400 m	Germany were originally awarded the gold medal, however, on an appeal by the Russian Team, were disqualified for pushing meaning the gold medal went to Great Britain & NI.					
WR world record | ER European record | CR championship record | NR national record | WL world leading | EL European leading | PB personal best | SB seasonal best

=== Field ===
Event	Gold		Silver		Bronze	
High jump	Stefan Holm; Sweden	2.34	Linus Thörnblad; Sweden	2.32	Martyn Bernard; Great Britain	2.29
Pole Vault	Danny Ecker; Germany	5.71	Denys Yurchenko; Ukraine	5.71; SB	Björn Otto; Germany	5.71
Long Jump	Andrew Howe; Italy	8.30; NR EL PB	Loúis Tsátoumas; Greece	8.02	Salim Sdiri; France	8.00
Triple Jump	Phillips Idowu; Great Britain	17.56; WL CR	Nathan Douglas; Great Britain	17.47; PB	Aleksandr Sergeyev; Russia	17.15; SB
Shot Put	Mikuláš Konopka; Slovakia	21.57; NR EL	Pavel Lyzhyn; Belarus	20.82; PB	Joachim Olsen; Denmark	20.55
WR world record | ER European record | CR championship record | NR national record | WL world leading | EL European leading | PB personal best | SB seasonal best

=== Combined ===
Event	Gold		Silver		Bronze	
Heptathlon	Roman Šebrle; Czech Republic	6196; WL	Aleksandr Pogorelov; Russia	6127	Andrei Krauchanka; Belarus	6090; PB
WR world record | ER European record | CR championship record | NR national record | WL world leading | EL European leading | PB personal best | SB seasonal best

== Women's results ==
=== Track ===
Event	Gold		Silver		Bronze	
60 m	Kim Gevaert; Belgium	7.12	Yevgeniya Polyakova; Russia	7.18	Daria Onyśko; Poland	7.20; PB
400 m	Nicola Sanders; Great Britain	50.02; WL NR PB	Ilona Usovich; Belarus	51.00; PB	Olesya Zykina; Russia	51.69; SB
800 m	Oksana Zbrozhek; Russia	1:59.23	Tetyana Petlyuk; Ukraine	1:59.84	Jolanda Čeplak; Slovenia	2:00.00
1500 m	Lidia Chojecka; Poland	4:05.13	Natalya Panteleyeva; Russia	4:06.04; PB	Olesya Chumakova; Russia	4:06.48; SB
3000 m	Lidia Chojecka; Poland	8:43.25	Marta Domínguez; Spain	8:44.40; SB	Silvia Weissteiner; Italy	8:44.81; NR PB
60 m H	Susanna Kallur; Sweden	7.87	Aleksandra Antonova; Russia	7.94	Kirsten Bolm; Germany	7.97; SB
4 × 400 m	Belarus; Yulyana Yushchanka; Iryna Khliustava; Svetlana Usovich; Ilona Usovich	3:27.83; NR CR	Russia; Olesya Zykina; Natalya Ivanova; Zhanna Kashcheyeva; Natalya Antyukh	3:28.16	Great Britain; Emma Duck; Nicola Sanders; Kim Wall; Lee McConnell	3:28.69; NR
WR world record | ER European record | CR championship record | NR national record | WL world leading | EL European leading | PB personal best | SB seasonal best

=== Field ===
Event	Gold		Silver		Bronze	
High jump	Tia Hellebaut; Belgium	2.05; WL CR NR;PB;SB;EL	Antonietta Di Martino; Italy	1.96	Ruth Beitia; Spain	1.96
High jump	Venelina Veneva (Bulgaria) originally took the bronze with 1.96 m but was later disqualified after testing positive for testosterone.					
Pole Vault	Svetlana Feofanova; Russia	4.76; SB	Yuliya Golubchikova; Russia	4.71; PB	Anna Rogowska; Poland	4.66
Long Jump	Naide Gomes; Portugal	6.89; WL NR	Concepción Montaner; Spain	6.69	Denisa Ščerbová; Czech Republic	6.64 =NR
Triple Jump	Carlota Castrejana; Spain	14.64; EL NR PB	Olesya Bufalova; Russia	14.50; PB	Teresa Nzola Meso Ba; France	14.49; NR PB
Shot Put	Assunta Legnante; Italy	18.92	Irina Khudoroshkina; Russia	18.50	Olga Ryabinkina; Russia	18.16
WR world record | ER European record | CR championship record | NR national record | WL world leading | EL European leading | PB personal best | SB seasonal best

=== Combined ===
Event	Gold		Silver		Bronze	
Pentathlon	Carolina Klüft; Sweden	4944; WL	Kelly Sotherton; Great Britain	4927; NR	Karin Ruckstuhl; Netherlands	4801; NR
WR world record | ER European record | CR championship record | NR national record | WL world leading | EL European leading | PB personal best | SB seasonal best

== Medal table ==
Rank	Nation	Gold	Silver	Bronze	Total
1	Great Britain	4	3	3	10
2	Italy	3	1	2	6
3	Sweden	3	1	0	4
4	Russia	2	9	4	15
5	Spain	2	4	4	10
6	Netherlands	2	1	1	4
7	Poland	2	0	3	5
8	Belgium	2	0	0	2
9	Belarus	1	2	1	4
10	Germany	1	1	2	4
11	Czech Republic	1	0	1	2
12	Ireland	1	0	0	1
12	Portugal	1	0	0	1
12	Slovakia	1	0	0	1
15	Ukraine	0	2	0	2
16	France	0	1	3	4
17	Greece	0	1	0	1
18	Bulgaria	0	0	1	1
18	Denmark	0	0	1	1
18	Slovenia	0	0	1	1
Totals (20 entries)		26	26	27	79

== Participating nations ==
- Albania (2)
- Armenia (1)
- Austria (6)
- Azerbaijan (1)
- Belarus (13)
- Belgium (6)
- Bulgaria (9)
- Croatia (4)
- Cyprus (3)
- Czech Republic (10)
- Denmark (7)
- Estonia (10)
- Finland (15)
- France (31)
- Georgia (1)
- Germany (31)
- Gibraltar (4)
- Great Britain (40)
- Greece (11)
- Hungary (7)
- Iceland (4)
- Ireland (13)
- Israel (3)
- Italy (17)
- Latvia (9)
- Liechtenstein (1)
- Lithuania (5)
- Luxembourg (1)
- Macedonia (2)
- Malta (3)
- Moldova (1)
- Monaco (1)
- Netherlands (10)
- Norway (7)
- Poland (27)
- Portugal (6)
- Romania (25)
- Russia (64)
- San Marino (1)
- Serbia (4)
- Slovakia (8)
- Slovenia (14)
- Spain (37)
- Sweden (15)
- Switzerland (4)
- Turkey (4)
- Ukraine (21)

== See also ==
- 2007 in athletics (track and field)
