= Ilona Usovich =

Belarusian sprinter

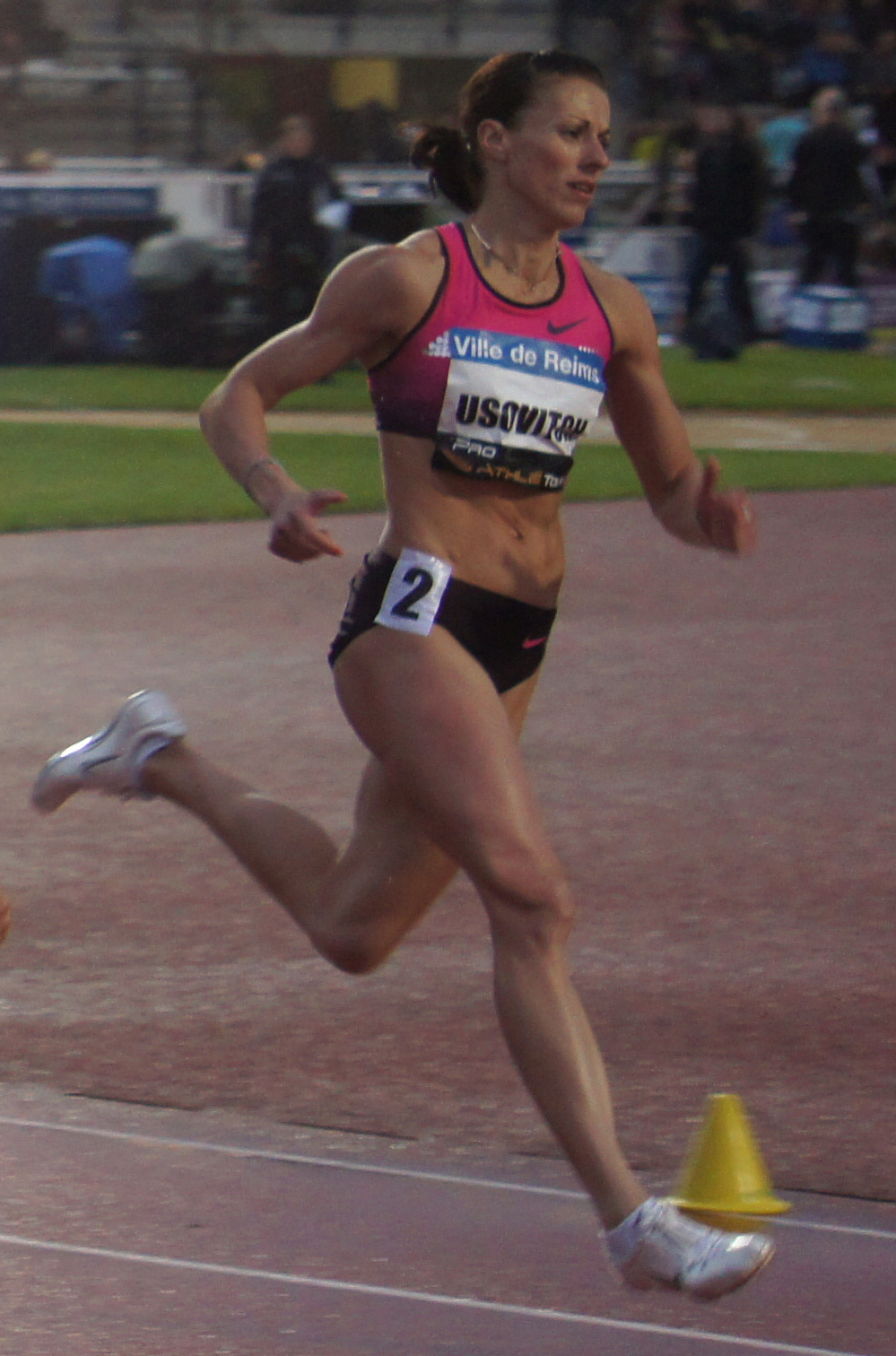
- Ilona Usovich in 2013

Personal information
- Born: November 14, 1982 (age 43) Chervyen, Soviet Union
- Height: 1.69 m (5 ft 6 1/2 in)
- Weight: 59 kg (130 lb)

Sport
- Country: Belarus
- Sport: Athletics
- Event: 400 m
Medal record
World Indoor Championships
| Silver medal – second place | 2008 Valencia | 4 × 400 m relay |
European Championships
| Silver medal – second place | 2006 Gothenburg | 4 × 400 m relay |
| Bronze medal – third place | 2012 Helsinki | 400 metres |
European Indoor Championships
| Gold medal – first place | 2007 Birmingham | 4 × 400 m relay |

Ilona Usovich (Belarusian: Ілона Усовіч; born 14 November 1982) is a Belarusian sprinter.

Together with Natallia Solohub, Anna Kozak and Svetlana Usovich (her sister) she won a silver medal in 4 × 400 metres relay at the 2004 IAAF World Indoor Championships. The next year Ilona finished 4th over 400 metres at the 2005 European Indoor Athletics Championships. For the 2006 IAAF World Indoor Championships, the Belarusian team had substituted Svetlana Usovich with Yulyana Zhalniaruk, and won a bronze medal.

She finished fifth in the 400 m final at the 2006 European Athletics Championships in Gothenburg and won a silver medal in the 4 × 400 m relay. The next year she won the 400 m silver medal and a 4 × 400 m relay gold medal at the 2007 European Athletics Indoor Championships. In 2012, she won a bronze medal at the European Championships.

She has represented Belarus at the 2008 and 2012 Summer Olympics, as well as the 2005 World Championships in Athletics
