= 2002 IAAF Grand Prix =

- Edition: 18th
- Dates: 8 February – 16 September
- Meetings: 27 (+1 final)

The 2002 IAAF Grand Prix was the eighteenth edition of the annual global series of one-day track and field competitions organized by the International Association of Athletics Federations (IAAF). The series was divided into four levels: 2002 IAAF Golden League, Grand Prix I and Grand Prix II, and IAAF Permit Meetings. There were seven Golden League meetings, Grand Prix I featured 9 meetings from 5 May to 23 August and Grand Prix II featured 11 meetings from 7 March to 8 September, making a combined total of 27 meetings for the series. An additional 10 IAAF Outdoor Permit Meetings were attached to the circuit.

Compared to the previous season, the meeting schedule remained mostly unchanged, with the exception of the dropping of the Nikaia meeting in Nice and the British Grand Prix II meeting being moved from Gateshead to Sheffield.

Performances on designated events on the circuit earned athletes points which qualified them for entry to the 2002 IAAF Grand Prix Final, held on 14 September in Paris, France. The honour of points leader for the series was shared between three athletes on 92 points: Hicham El Guerrouj and Félix Sánchez topped the men's side while Marion Jones topped the women's side.

== Meetings ==
#	Date	Meeting name	City	Country	Level
-	8 February	Canberra Track Classic	Canberra	Australia	IAAF Permit Meeting
1	7 March	Melbourne Track Classic	Melbourne	Australia	IAAF Grand Prix II
2	12 April	Engen Grand Prix	Pretoria	South Africa	IAAF Grand Prix II
-	19 April	Engen Grand Prix Final	Cape Town	South Africa	IAAF Permit Meeting
-	27 April	Meeting du Conseil Général de Martinique	Fort-de-France	Martinique	IAAF Permit Meeting
3	5 May	Grand Prix Brasil de Atletismo	Rio de Janeiro	Brazil	IAAF Grand Prix I
4	11 May	Japan Grand Prix	Osaka	Japan	IAAF Grand Prix I
5	15 May	Qatar Athletic Grand Prix 1	Doha	Qatar	IAAF Grand Prix I
6	18 May	Adidas Oregon Track Classic	Portland	United States	IAAF Grand Prix II
7	26 May	Prefontaine Classic	Eugene	United States	IAAF Grand Prix I
8	2 June	Fanny Blankers-Koen Games	Hengelo	Netherlands	IAAF Grand Prix II
-	5 June	Notturna di Milano	Milan	Italy	IAAF Permit Meeting
-	7 June	Meeting di Atletica Leggera Torino	Turin	Italy	IAAF Permit Meeting
9	8 June	Oracle US Open	Palo Alto	United States	IAAF Grand Prix I
10	8 June	Meeting de Atletismo Sevilla	Seville	Spain	IAAF Grand Prix II
-	9 June	Znamensky Memorial	Moscow	Russia	IAAF Permit Meeting
11	10 June	Athens Grand Prix Tsiklitiria	Athens	Greece	IAAF Grand Prix I
12	11 June	Cena Slovenska – Slovak Gold	Bratislava	Slovakia	IAAF Grand Prix II
-	16 June	Meeting du Nord	Lille	France	IAAF Permit Meeting
13	28 June	Bislett Games	Oslo	Norway	2002 IAAF Golden League
14	30 June	Norwich Union Classic	Sheffield	United Kingdom	IAAF Grand Prix II
15	2 July	Athletissima	Lausanne	Switzerland	IAAF Grand Prix I
16	5 July	Meeting de Paris	Paris	France	2002 IAAF Golden League
17	8 July	IAAF Meeting Zagreb	Zagreb	Croatia	IAAF Grand Prix II
18	12 July	Golden Gala	Rome	Italy	2002 IAAF Golden League
-	14 July	MAL Cup Meeting	Szombathely	Hungary	IAAF Permit Meeting
19	16 July	DN Galan	Stockholm	Sweden	IAAF Grand Prix I
20	19 July	Herculis	Monte Carlo	Monaco	2002 IAAF Golden League
-	24 July	International Olympic Meeting	Thessaloniki	Greece	IAAF Permit Meeting
21	13 August	Asics GP Helsinki	Helsinki	Finland	IAAF Grand Prix II
22	16 August	Weltklasse Zürich	Zürich	Switzerland	2002 IAAF Golden League
23	19 August	Gugl-Meeting	Linz	Austria	IAAF Grand Prix II
24	23 August	Norwich Union British Grand Prix	London	United Kingdom	IAAF Grand Prix I
25	30 August	Memorial Van Damme	Brussels	Belgium	2002 IAAF Golden League
26	6 September	ISTAF Berlin	Berlin	Germany	2002 IAAF Golden League
27	8 September	Rieti Meeting	Rieti	Italy	IAAF Grand Prix II
F	14 September	2002 IAAF Grand Prix Final	Paris	France	IAAF Grand Prix Final
-	16 September	Super Track & Field Meet	Yokohama	Japan	IAAF Permit Meeting

== Points standings ==
=== Overall men ===
Rank	Athlete	Nation	Meets	Points
1	Hicham El Guerrouj	Morocco	8	92
1	Félix Sánchez	Dominican Republic	8	92
3	Benjamin Limo	Kenya	8	80
4	Christian Olsson	Sweden	8	78
5	Maurice Greene	United States	8	76
6	Jonathan Edwards	United Kingdom	8	75
7	Bernard Williams	United States	8	72
8	Kim Collins	Saint Kitts and Nevis	8	71
9	Bernard Lagat	United States	8	70
10	Timothy Mack	United States	8	67.5
11	Walter Davis	United States	8	67
12	Tim Lobinger	Germany	8	66
13	Jeff Hartwig	United States	8	65
14	Hadi Soua'an Al-Somaily	Saudi Arabia	8	62
14	James Carter	United States	8	62
16	Mark Boswell	Canada	8	61.5
17	William Chirchir	Kenya	8	60
18	Alexander Martínez	Cuba	8	59
19	Cornelius Chirchir	Kenya	8	58
20	Stefan Holm	Sweden	7	57.5
21	Coby Miller	United States	8	57
22	Eric Thomas	United States	8	56
23	Abraham Chebii	Kenya	7	55
24	Joey Woody	United States	8	52
25	Sammy Kipketer	Kenya	6	51
25	Francis Obikwelu	Portugal	6	51
25	Rui Silva	Portugal	7	51
25	Paul Bitok	Kenya	8	51
29	Lars Börgeling	Germany	6	49.5
30	Stéphane Diagana	France	6	49
30	Jadel Gregório	Brazil	8	49
30	Laban Rotich	Kenya	8	49
33	Dwain Chambers	United Kingdom	5	48
34	Michael Blackwood	Jamaica	6	47
34	Leonard Byrd	United States	6	47
36	Nick Hysong	United States	7	46.5
37	Jon Drummond	United States	8	45
37	Luke Kipkosgei	Kenya	8	45
39	Fawzi Al-Shammari	Kuwait	6	44
39	Aleksandr Averbukh	Israel	6	44
39	Aleksandr Glavatskiy	Belarus	8	44
42	Viktor Chistiakov	Australia	8	43.5
43	Antonio Pettigrew	United States	7	43
44	Adrián Annus	Hungary	6	42
44	Abdelkader Hachlaf	Morocco	8	42
46	Fabrizio Mori	Italy	6	39
46	Timothy Rusan	United States	7	39
48	Vasiliy Gorshkov	Russia	5	38.5
49	Koji Murofushi	Japan	6	38
50	Staffan Strand	Sweden	6	37.5
51	Salah Hissou	Morocco	5	36
51	Balázs Kiss	Hungary	8	36
53	Abderrahim Goumri	Morocco	4	35
53	Richard Limo	Kenya	6	35
55	Igor Astapkovich	Belarus	4	34
56	Chris Rawlinson	United Kingdom	6	33
56	Andriy Skvaruk	Ukraine	6	33
58	Yaroslav Rybakov	Russia	6	32.5
59	Mark Bett	Kenya	5	32
59	Kevin Toth	United States	6	32
61	Mohammed Amyn	Morocco	5	31
62	Aziz Zakari	Ghana	6	30.5
63	Phillips Idowu	United Kingdom	4	30
64	Andrei Chubsa	Belarus	4	28.5
65	Kenta Bell	United States	5	28
65	Uchenna Emedolu	Nigeria	5	28
65	Yuriy Bilonoh	Ukraine	6	28
65	Matt Hemingway	United States	6	28
69	Tibor Gécsek	Hungary	6	27
69	Jiří Mužík	Czech Republic	6	27
71	Greg Haughton	Jamaica	4	26
71	Adam Nelson	United States	5	26
73	Tomáš Janků	Czech Republic	5	25.5
74	Paweł Januszewski	Poland	5	25
75	Nobuharu Asahara	Japan	4	24
75	Avard Moncur	Bahamas	4	24
75	Robert Rono	Kenya	4	24
78	Abderrahmane Hammad	Algeria	5	23.5
79	Vyacheslav Shabunin	Russia	5	23
79	Dai Tamesue	Japan	6	23
81	Frankie Fredericks	Namibia	4	22
81	Olli-Pekka Karjalainen	Finland	4	22
81	Oleksandr Krykun	Ukraine	4	22
84	Michael McDonald	Jamaica	4	21
84	Leevan Sands	Bahamas	4	21
84	Paolo Dal Soglio	Italy	6	21
84	Milan Haborák	Slovakia	6	21
88	Yoandri Betanzos	Cuba	3	20
88	John Kibowen	Kenya	3	20
88	Serhiy Lebid	Ukraine	3	20
88	Mark Lewis-Francis	United Kingdom	3	20
88	Shawn Crawford	United States	4	20
88	Seneca Lassiter	United States	4	20
88	Driss Maazouzi	France	4	20
88	Vladyslav Piskunov	Ukraine	4	20
88	Ian Weakley	Jamaica	4	20
97	Deji Aliu	Nigeria	4	19.5
97	Paul Burgess	Australia	4	19.5
97	Pyotr Brayko	Russia	6	19.5
100	Rostislav Dimitrov	Bulgaria	4	19
100	Craig Mottram	Australia	4	19
100	Angelo Taylor	United States	4	1

=== Overall women ===
Rank	Athlete	Nation	Meets	Points
1	Marion Jones	United States	8	92
2	Gail Devers	United States	8	87
3	Ana Guevara	Mexico	7	84
4	Tatyana Shikolenko	Russia	8	83
5	Berhane Adere	Ethiopia	8	82
5	Osleidys Menéndez	Cuba	8	82
7	Brigitte Foster-Hylton	Jamaica	8	78
8	Lorraine Fenton	Jamaica	8	76
9	Tayna Lawrence	Jamaica	8	75
10	Gabriela Szabo	Romania	7	74
11	Alesia Turava	Belarus	8	70
12	Edith Masai	Kenya	8	68
13	Chryste Gaines	United States	8	66
14	Glory Alozie	Spain	8	64
15	Anjanette Kirkland	United States	8	63
16	Steffi Nerius	Germany	8	61
17	Jearl Miles Clark	United States	8	60
18	Felicia Țilea-Moldovan	Romania	8	58
19	Kaltouma Nadjina	Chad	8	56
20	Lacena Golding-Clarke	Jamaica	8	54
21	Debbie Ferguson	Bahamas	8	53
22	Jenny Adams	United States	8	51
23	Mikaela Ingberg	Finland	7	48
24	Natalya Sadova	Russia	6	46
24	Taina Kolkkala	Finland	8	46
24	Tünde Vaszi	Hungary	8	46
27	Nikolett Szabó	Hungary	7	45
28	Melissa Morrison-Howard	United States	8	44.5
29	Torri Edwards	United States	8	43
30	Regina Jacobs	United States	5	42
30	Muriel Hurtis	France	6	42
32	Maria Cioncan	Romania	5	41
33	Tatyana Tomashova	Russia	5	40
33	Ellina Zvereva	Belarus	6	40
35	Maurren Maggi	Brazil	5	39
35	Judit Varga	Hungary	6	39
37	Sandie Richards	Jamaica	8	38.5
38	Suziann Reid	United States	8	38
39	LaTasha Colander	United States	7	37
40	Věra Pospíšilová-Cechlová	Czech Republic	7	36
41	Kelli White	United States	7	35.5
42	Leah Malot	Kenya	6	35
43	Tatyana Kotova	Russia	5	34
43	Chandra Sturrup	Bahamas	5	34
43	Monique Hennagan	United States	7	34
43	Jackie Edwards	Bahamas	8	34
47	Zhanna Block	Ukraine	4	33
47	Nicole Teter	United States	4	33
47	Werknesh Kidane	Ethiopia	6	33
50	Suzy Favor Hamilton	United States	4	32
50	Olga Rublyova	Russia	5	32
50	Aretha Thurmond	United States	5	32
50	Suzanne Powell	United States	6	32
54	Yelena Zadorozhnaya	Russia	4	31
54	Beatrice Faumuina	New Zealand	5	31
54	Paula Tarvainen	Finland	7	31
57	Miesha McKelvy-Jones	United States	5	30
57	Kris Kuehl	United States	6	30
57	Iryna Yatchenko	Belarus	7	30
60	Nicoleta Grasu	Romania	5	29
61	Natalya Gorelova	Russia	5	28
62	Sonia O'Sullivan	Australia	4	27
62	Mercy Nku	Nigeria	5	27
64	Olesya Zykina	Russia	3	26
64	Yekaterina Ivakina	Russia	5	26
66	Patricia Girard	France	4	25
66	Tatyana Ter-Mesrobyan	Russia	7	25
68	Süreyya Ayhan	Turkey	2	24
68	Carla Sacramento	Portugal	4	24
68	Olena Krasovska	Ukraine	5	24
68	Vonette Dixon	Jamaica	7	24
72	Sonia Bisset	Cuba	3	22
73	Elvan Abeylegesse	Turkey	4	21
73	Jo Pavey	United Kingdom	4	21
73	Valentīna Gotovska	Latvia	8	21
76	Zhor El Kamch	Morocco	4	20
76	Isabella Ochichi	Kenya	4	20
76	Olena Antonova	Ukraine	5	20
79	Nora Aída Bicet	Cuba	3	19
79	Mireille Nguimgo	Cameroon	3	19
79	Sentayehu Ejigu	Ethiopia	4	19
79	Concepción Montaner	Spain	4	19
79	Amy Mbacké Thiam	Senegal	4	19
84	Kelly Holmes	United Kingdom	2	18
84	Lidia Chojecka	Poland	3	18
84	Marla Runyan	United States	3	18
84	Geraldine Hendricken	Ireland	4	18
84	Seilala Sua	United States	4	18
84	Antonina Yefremova	Ukraine	5	18
90	Benita Johnson	Australia	2	17
90	Maria Mutola	Mozambique	2	17
90	Karen Shinkins	Ireland	3	17
90	Ayelech Worku	Ethiopia	3	17
90	Olabisi Afolabi	Nigeria	4	17
90	Laverne Eve	Bahamas	4	17
90	Nadine Faustin-Parker	Haiti	5	17
90	Beverly McDonald	Jamaica	5	17
98	Elena Iagar	Romania	2	16
98	Claudia Coslovich	Italy	3	16
98	Tirunesh Dibaba	Ethiopia	3	16
98	Kayoko Fukushi	Japan	3	16
98	Mardrea Hyman	Jamaica	3	16
98	Kim Gevaert	Belgium	4	16
98	Heide Seyerling	South Africa	4	16
