= Athletics at the 2003 Pan American Games – Women's 4 × 400 metres relay =

Women's 4 × 400 metres relay at the Pan American Games

The women's 4 × 400 metres relay event at the 2003 Pan American Games was held on August 9.

== Results ==
Rank	Nation	Athletes	Time	Notes
1st place, gold medalist(s)	United States	Me'Lisa Barber, Moushaumi Robinson, Julian Clay, DeeDee Trotter	3:26.40	
2nd place, silver medalist(s)	Jamaica	Naleya Downer, Michelle Burgher, Novlene Williams, Allison Beckford	3:27.34	
3rd place, bronze medalist(s)	Brazil	Maria Laura Almirão, Josiane Tito, Geisa Coutinho, Lucimar Teodoro	3:28.07	
4	Mexico	Liliana Allen, Mayra González, Gabriela Medina, Ana Guevara	3:28.23	NR
5	Cuba	Libania Grenot, Yanelis Lara, Yudalis Díaz, Adriana Muñoz	3:28.79	
6	Puerto Rico	Militza Castro, Yvonne Harrison, Sandra Moya, Yamelis Ortiz	3:32.28	
7	Dominican Republic	Yelmi Martínez, Jazmín Rodríguez, Claudia Rosa Vargas, Clara Hernández	3:38.48	NR
	Colombia		DQ	
