= 2002 World Junior Championships in Athletics – Women's 4 × 400 metres relay =

The women's 4x400 metres relay event at the 2002 World Junior Championships in Athletics was held in Kingston, Jamaica, at National Stadium on 20 and 21 July.

== Medalists ==
Gold	Christina Hardeman; Monique Henderson; Tiffany Ross; Lashinda Demus; United States
Silver	Kim Wall; Amy Spencer; Vernicha James; Lisa Miller; United Kingdom
Bronze	Yelena Mygunova; Mariya Dryakhlova; Yuliya Gushchina; Tatyana Popova; Russia

== Results ==
=== Final ===
21 July

Rank	Nation	Competitors	Time	Notes
1st place, gold medalist(s)	United States	Christina Hardeman; Monique Henderson; Tiffany Ross; Lashinda Demus	3:29.95	
2nd place, silver medalist(s)	United Kingdom	Kim Wall; Amy Spencer; Vernicha James; Lisa Miller	3:30.46	
3rd place, bronze medalist(s)	Russia	Yelena Mygunova; Mariya Dryakhlova; Yuliya Gushchina; Tatyana Popova	3:30.72	
4	Jamaica	Davita Prendergast; Sheryl Morgan; Carlene Robinson; Camille Robinson	3:31.90	
5	Germany	Eileen Müller; Sara Jander; Sandra Schmadtke; Jana Neubert	3:36.82	
6	Romania	Angela Moroșanu; Simona Barcau; Gabriela Ciuca; Ioana Ciurila	3:39.95	
7	Australia	Kate Pedley; Annabelle Smith; Morgan Whiley; Rebecca Irwin	3:40.45	
	Senegal	Aminata Sylla; Adja Ndiaye; Gnima Faye; Fatou Diabaye	DNS	

=== Heats ===
20 July

==== Heat 1 ====
Rank	Nation	Competitors	Time	Notes
1	Russia	Yelena Mygunova; Mariya Dryakhlova; Yuliya Gushchina; Tatyana Popova	3:31.64	Q
2	Jamaica	Davita Prendergast; Carlene Robinson; Kerron Stewart; Sheryl Morgan	3:32.20	Q
3	Germany	Eileen Müller; Sandra Schmadtke; Sara Jander; Jana Neubert	3:37.02	q
4	Australia	Kate Pedley; Annabelle Smith; Morgan Whiley; Rebecca Irwin	3:40.72	q
5	Senegal	Aminata Sylla; Adja Ndiaye; Gnima Faye; Fatou Diabaye	3:57.13	q

==== Heat 2 ====
Rank	Nation	Competitors	Time	Notes
1	United States	Christina Hardeman; Monique Henderson; Sanya Richards; Lashinda Demus	3:35.84	Q
2	United Kingdom	Kim Wall; Rachael Thompson; Vicky Griffiths; Lisa Miller	3:38.49	Q
3	Romania	Angela Moroșanu; Simona Barcau; Gabriela Ciuca; Ioana Ciurila	3:40.21	q
	France	Céline Landmann; Géraldine Lécefel; Virginie Michanol; Natalia Losange	DNF	

== Participation ==
According to an unofficial count, 40 athletes from 9 countries participated in the event.

- Australia (4)
- France (4)
- Germany (4)
- Jamaica (5)
- Romania (4)
- Russia (4)
- Senegal (4)
- United Kingdom (6)
- United States (5)
