= Athletics at the 2007 Pan American Games – Women's 400 metres =

Women's 400 metres at the Pan American Games

The women's 400 metres event at the 2007 Pan American Games was held on July 23–25.

== Medalists ==
| Gold | Silver | Bronze |
|---|---|---|
| Ana Guevara; Mexico | Christine Amertil; Bahamas | Indira Terrero; Cuba |

== Results ==
=== Heats ===
Qualification: First 2 of each heat (Q) and the next 2 fastest (q) qualified for the final.

| Rank | Heat | Name | Nationality | Time | Notes |
|---|---|---|---|---|---|
| 1 | 1 | Ana Guevara | Mexico | 51.10 | Q |
| 2 | 2 | Davita Prendergast | Jamaica | 51.47 | Q |
| 3 | 2 | Indira Terrero | Cuba | 51.56 | Q |
| 4 | 3 | Shereefa Lloyd | Jamaica | 51.66 | Q |
| 5 | 3 | Christine Amertil | Bahamas | 51.67 | Q, SB |
| 6 | 2 | Debbie Dunn | United States | 51.86 | q |
| 7 | 1 | LaVerne Jones | United States Virgin Islands | 51.94 | Q, PB |
| 8 | 1 | Monique Henderson | United States | 52.18 | q |
| 9 | 3 | Gabriela Medina | Mexico | 52.22 | |
| 10 | 2 | Kineke Alexander | Saint Vincent and the Grenadines | 52.37 | |
| 11 | 1 | Maria Laura Almirão | Brazil | 52.72 | |
| 12 | 1 | Esther Akinsulie | Canada | 52.77 | |
| 13 | 3 | Aliann Pompey | Guyana | 53.03 | |
| 14 | 2 | Ginou Etienne | Haiti | 53.13 | |
| 15 | 3 | Carline Muir | Canada | 53.25 | |
| 16 | 3 | Nathandra John | Saint Kitts and Nevis | 53.42 | |
| 17 | 2 | María Idrobo | Colombia | 54.29 | |
| 18 | 3 | Sheila Ferreira | Brazil | 54.44 | |
| 19 | 3 | Britney St. Louis | Trinidad and Tobago | 54.45 | |
| 20 | 1 | Lucy Jaramillo | Ecuador | 54.55 | |
| 21 | 2 | Hazel Ann Regis | Grenada | 54.75 | |
| | 1 | Dominique Maloney | British Virgin Islands | DQ | |

=== Final ===
| Rank | Lane | Name | Nationality | Time | Notes |
|---|---|---|---|---|---|
| 1st place, gold medalist(s) | 4 | Ana Guevara | Mexico | 50.34 | SB |
| 2nd place, silver medalist(s) | 2 | Christine Amertil | Bahamas | 50.99 | SB |
| 3rd place, bronze medalist(s) | 6 | Indira Terrero | Cuba | 51.09 | |
| 4 | 3 | Shereefa Lloyd | Jamaica | 51.19 | |
| 5 | 5 | Davita Prendergast | Jamaica | 51.90 | |
| 6 | 1 | Monique Henderson | United States | 52.28 | |
| 7 | 7 | LaVerne Jones | United States Virgin Islands | 52.97 | |
| 8 | 8 | Debbie Dunn | United States | 52.97 | |
