= 2007 World Championships in Athletics – Women's 4 × 400 metres relay =

The women's 4 × 400 metres relay at the 2007 World Championships in Athletics was held at the Nagai Stadium on 1 and 2 September.

== Medalists ==
Gold	Silver	Bronze
United States; DeeDee Trotter; Allyson Felix; Mary Wineberg; Sanya Richards; Monique Hennagan*; Natasha Hastings*	Jamaica; Shericka Williams; Shereefa Lloyd; Davita Prendergast; Novlene Williams; Anastasia Le-Roy*	Great Britain; Christine Ohuruogu; Marilyn Okoro; Lee McConnell; Nicola Sanders; Donna Fraser*

* Runners who participated in the heats only and received medals.

== Schedule ==
Date	Time	Round
September 1, 2007	20:05	Heats
September 2, 2007	20:30	Final

== Results ==
=== Heats ===
Qualification: First 3 of each heat (Q) plus the 2 fastest times (q) advance to the final.

Rank	Heat	Nation	Athletes	Time	Notes
1	2	United States	DeeDee Trotter, Monique Hennagan, Mary Wineberg, Natasha Hastings	3:23.37	Q, WL
2	1	Russia	Yelena Migunova, Natalya Nazarova, Lyudmila Litvinova, Tatyana Levina	3:23.49	Q, WL
3	1	Belarus	Yulyana Yushchanka, Iryna Khliustava, Anna Kozak, Sviatlana Usovich	3:25.14	Q
4	2	Great Britain	Lee McConnell, Donna Fraser, Marilyn Okoro, Nicola Sanders	3:25.45	Q, SB
5	1	Jamaica	Shericka Williams, Anastasia Le-Roy, Davita Prendergast, Shereefa Lloyd	3:26.14	Q, SB
6	2	Poland	Agnieszka Karpiesiuk, Grażyna Prokopek, Zuzanna Radecka, Anna Jesień	3:26.45	Q
7	1	Cuba	Aymée Martínez, Daimí Pernía, Zulia Calatayud, Indira Terrero	3:27.04	q, SB
8	2	Mexico	Zudikey Rodriguez, Gabriela Medina, Nallely Vela, Ana Guevara	3:27.14	q, NR
9	1	Nigeria	Folashade Abugan, Christy Ekpukhon Ihunaegbo, Olouma Nwoke, Sekinat Adesanya	3:27.97	SB
10	2	France	Thélia Sigère, Marie-Angélique Lacordelle, Phara Anacharsis, Solen Désert	3:29.87	
11	2	Japan	Sayaka Aoki, Asami Tanno, Satomi Kubokura, Mayu Kida	3:30.17	NR
12	1	Ukraine	Nataliya Pyhyda, Antonina Yefremova, Olha Zavhorodnya, Oksana Shcherbak	3:30.76	
13	2	Brazil	Maria Laura Almirão, Emily Pinheiro, Sheila Ferreira, Josiane Tito	3:34.34	
14	1	Romania	Taisia Crestincov, Liliana Popescu, Elena Mirela Lavric, Ionela Târlea-Manolache	3:35.69	
	2	India	Mandeep Kaur, Manjeet Kaur, Chitra K. Soman, Iyleen Samantha Lawrence Anthony	DQ	

=== Final ===
Rank	Nation	Athletes	Time	Notes
1st place, gold medalist(s)	United States	DeeDee Trotter, Allyson Felix, Mary Wineberg, Sanya Richards	3:18.55	WL
2nd place, silver medalist(s)	Jamaica	Shericka Williams, Shereefa Lloyd, Davita Prendergast, Novlene Williams	3:19.73	NR
3rd place, bronze medalist(s)	Great Britain	Christine Ohuruogu, Marilyn Okoro, Lee McConnell, Nicola Sanders	3:20.04	NR
4	Russia	Lyudmila Litvinova, Natalya Nazarova, Tatyana Veshkurova, Natalya Antyukh	3:20.25	SB
5	Belarus	Yulyana Yushchanka, Iryna Khliustava, Ilona Usovich, Sviatlana Usovich	3:21.88	NR
6	Poland	Zuzanna Radecka, Grażyna Prokopek, Ewelina Sętowska-Dryk, Anna Jesień	3:26.49	
7	Cuba	Aymée Martínez, Daimí Pernía, Zulia Calatayud, Indira Terrero	3:27.05	
8	Mexico	Zudikey Rodriguez, Gabriela Medina, Nallely Vela, Ana Guevara	3:29.14	
