= 2009 World Championships in Athletics – Women's 400 metres =

The women's 400 metres at the 2009 World Championships in Athletics was held at the Olympic Stadium on 15, 16 and 18 August. The world-leader prior to the competition, Sanya Richards, was regarded as the favourite in the event, although her previous failure to convert circuit dominance to major championship success raised some doubts. Reigning Olympic and world champion Christine Ohuruogu entered the championships as only the 25th fastest in the world that year, although a low-key run up also preceded her previous victories. Jamaicans Shericka Williams and Novlene Williams-Mills were predicted as possible medallists, while Russian Antonina Krivoshapka held the second fastest time in the world prior to the tournament.

All the favoured athletes made it through the heats and Motswana Amantle Montsho, a 2008 Olympic finalist, had the fastest time of the day with 50.65 seconds. Unusually, two of the race favourites, Richards and Ohuruogu, faced each other in the first round, with the Richards taking first place. The two faced each other again in the semi-finals, and Richards again beat the defending champion. The other two semi-finals were much faster, however, with five athletes breaking 50 seconds. Shericka Williams and Debbie Dunn set personal bests to qualify in the second final, and Montsho and Williams-Mills had run season's best to qualify – Aliann Pompey's national record was not enough to reach the final.

In the final, Richards started the race quickly, leading the first 100 m. Krivoshapka pulled slightly ahead of her at the halfway, but Richards regained the lead on the final bend. She remained in front through the home straight and won in a world-leading 49 seconds flat. Williams overtook Krivoshapka on the final stretch to take silver with a personal best of 49.32 seconds, and the Russian retained third place for the bronze. Williams-Mills was close behind for fourth place, but it was Ohuruogu's fifth-place finish that drew more attention.

Richards, often the fastest 400 m runner on the athletics circuit, won her first major gold medal of her career with the 38th sub-50 clocking of her career – the most of any athlete. After a lacklustre season, the 2007 World Champion Ohuruogu could not repeat the performance that had made her Olympic champion the previous year. Shericka Williams had twice lowered her personal best, and her silver medal-winning performance was 0.02 seconds outside of Lorraine Fenton's Jamaican record. Krivoshapka's bronze was Russia's first medal in the event in the post-Soviet era.

== Medalists ==
Gold	Silver	Bronze
Sanya Richards; United States	Shericka Williams; Jamaica	Antonina Krivoshapka; Russia

== Records ==
World record	Marita Koch (GDR)	47.60	Canberra, Australia	6 October 1985
Championship record	Jarmila Kratochvílová (TCH)	47.99	Helsinki, Finland	10 August 1983
World Leading	Sanya Richards (USA)	49.23	Oslo, Norway	3 July 2009
African record	Falilat Ogunkoya (NGR)	49.10	Atlanta, United States	29 July 1996
Asian record	Ma Yuqin (CHN)	49.81	Beijing, China	11 September 1993
North American record	Sanya Richards (USA)	48.70	Athens, Greece	16 September 2006
South American record	Ximena Restrepo (COL)	49.64	Barcelona, Spain	5 August 1992
European record	Marita Koch (GDR)	47.60	Canberra, Australia	6 October 1985
Oceanian Record	Cathy Freeman (AUS)	48.63	Atlanta, United States	29 July 1996

== Qualification standards ==
A time	B time
51.50	52.30

== Schedule ==
Date	Time	Round
August 15, 2009	13:05	Heats
August 16, 2009	19:40	Semifinals
August 18, 2009	19:35	Final

== Results ==
=== Heats ===
Qualification: First 3 in each heat(Q) and the next 6 fastest(q) advance to the semifinals.

Rank	Heat	Name	Nationality	Time	Notes
1	3	Amantle Montsho	Botswana	50.65	Q
2	6	Antonina Krivoshapka	Russia	51.03	Q
3	5	Sanya Richards	United States	51.06	Q
4	4	Debbie Dunn	United States	51.13	Q
5	4	Anastasiya Kapachinskaya	Russia	51.17	Q
6	3	Shericka Williams	Jamaica	51.23	Q
7	5	Christine Ohuruogu	Great Britain & N.I.	51.30	Q
8	1	Lyudmila Litvinova	Russia	51.31	Q
9	5	Aliann Pompey	Guyana	51.38	Q
10	1	Libania Grenot	Italy	51.45	Q
11	2	Novlene Williams-Mills	Jamaica	51.55	Q
12	3	Solen Désert-Mariller	France	51.63	Q, SB
13	6	Nicola Sanders	Great Britain & N.I.	51.64	Q
14	3	Folasade Abugan	Nigeria	51.70	q
15	2	Jessica Beard	United States	51.72	Q
16	2	Sorina Nwachukwu	Germany	51.74	Q
17	5	Norma González	Colombia	51.86	q, PB
18	1	Indira Terrero	Cuba	51.98	Q
19	2	Kineke Alexander	Saint Vincent and the Grenadines	52.44	q, SB
20	1	Tiandra Ponteen	Saint Kitts and Nevis	52.54	q
21	6	Amy Mbacké Thiam	Senegal	52.79	Q
22	4	Amaka Ogoegbunam	Nigeria	52.85	Q
23	2	Joy Nakhumicha Sakari	Kenya	52.88	q
24	1	Christine Day	Jamaica	53.13	q
25	3	Racheal Nachula	Zambia	53.21	
25	6	Esther Akinsulie	Canada	53.21	
27	6	Asami Tanno	Japan	53.30	
28	4	Chandrika Rasnayake	Sri Lanka	53.68	
29	1	Marina Maslenko	Kazakhstan	54.38	
30	4	Fatou Bintou Fall	Senegal	54.46	
31	5	Makelesi Bulikiobo	Fiji	54.65	SB
32	5	Trish Bartholomew	Grenada	54.89	
33	6	Sharolyn Scott	Costa Rica	55.63	PB
34	2	Kia Davis	Liberia	56.85	
35	5	Claudine Yemalin	Benin	58.82	
36	1	Khin Phyo Thet	Myanmar	1:00.35	PB
37	4	Rozina Shafqat	Pakistan	1:00.72	SB
38	6	Rania Alqebali	Jordan	1:00.90	SB
	2	Khoury Keita	Mauritania	DQ	
	4	Christine Amertil	Bahamas	DQ	
	3	Nawal El Jack	Sudan	DNF	
	3	Evodie Lydie Saramandji	Central African Republic	DNS	

Key: PB = Personal best, Q = qualification by place in heat, q = qualification by overall place, SB = Seasonal best

=== Semifinals ===
Qualification: First 2 in each semifinal(Q) and the next 2 fastest(q) advance to the final.

Rank	Heat	Name	Nationality	Time	Notes
1	2	Shericka Williams	Jamaica	49.51	Q, PB
2	2	Antonina Krivoshapka	Russia	49.67	Q
3	1	Novlene Williams-Mills	Jamaica	49.88	Q, SB
4	1	Amantle Montsho	Botswana	49.89	Q, SB
5	2	Debbie Dunn	United States	49.95	q, PB
6	3	Sanya Richards	United States	50.21	Q
7	1	Anastasiya Kapachinskaya	Russia	50.30	q
8	3	Christine Ohuruogu	Great Britain & N.I.	50.35	Q, SB
9	2	Nicola Sanders	Great Britain & N.I.	50.45	SB
10	3	Lyudmila Litvinova	Russia	50.52	
11	1	Aliann Pompey	Guyana	50.71	NR
12	3	Libania Grenot	Italy	50.85	
13	1	Jessica Beard	United States	51.20	
14	2	Amy Mbacké Thiam	Senegal	51.70	
15	2	Folasade Abugan	Nigeria	51.75	
16	3	Indira Terrero	Cuba	51.87	
17	1	Norma González	Colombia	51.91	
18	3	Sorina Nwachukwu	Germany	51.98	
19	2	Joy Nakhumicha Sakari	Kenya	52.69	
20	3	Tiandra Ponteen	Saint Kitts and Nevis	53.22	
21	2	Solen Désert-Mariller	France	53.26	
22	1	Kineke Alexander	Saint Vincent and the Grenadines	53.43	
23	1	Christine Day	Jamaica	53.46	
	1	Amaka Ogoegbunam	Nigeria	DNF	

Key: DNF = Did not finish, NR = National record, PB = Personal best, Q = qualification by place in heat, q = qualification by overall place, SB = Seasonal best

=== Final ===
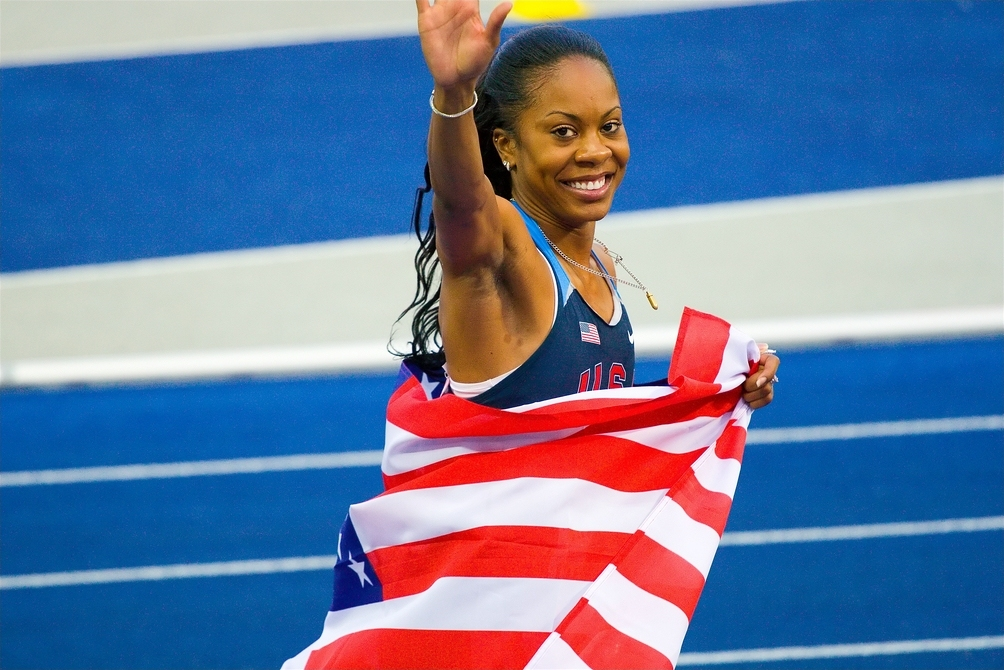
Sanya Richards won her first major championships in Berlin

Rank	Name	Nationality	Time	Notes
1st place, gold medalist(s)	Sanya Richards	United States	49.00	WL
2nd place, silver medalist(s)	Shericka Williams	Jamaica	49.32	PB
3rd place, bronze medalist(s)	Antonina Krivoshapka	Russia	49.71	
4	Novlene Williams-Mills	Jamaica	49.77	SB
5	Christine Ohuruogu	Great Britain & N.I.	50.21	SB
6	Debbie Dunn	United States	50.35	
7	Anastasiya Kapachinskaya	Russia	50.53	
8	Amantle Montsho	Botswana	50.65	

Key: PB = Personal best, SB = Seasonal best, WL = World leading (in a given season)
