= 2002 World Junior Championships in Athletics – Women's 400 metres =

The women's 400 metres event at the 2002 World Junior Championships in Athletics was held in Kingston, Jamaica, at National Stadium on 16, 17 and 18 July.

== Medalists ==
Gold	Monique Henderson; United States
Silver	Sanya Richards; United States
Bronze	Sheryl Morgan; Jamaica

== Results ==
=== Final ===
18 July

Rank	Name	Nationality	Time	Notes
1st place, gold medalist(s)	Monique Henderson	United States	51.10	
2nd place, silver medalist(s)	Sanya Richards	United States	51.49	
3rd place, bronze medalist(s)	Sheryl Morgan	Jamaica	52.61	
4	Tatyana Popova	Russia	52.68	
5	Lisa Miller	United Kingdom	53.20	
6	Joanne Cuddihy	Ireland	53.36	
7	Mariya Dryakhlova	Russia	53.76	
8	Yemi Fagbamila	Nigeria	54.44	

=== Semifinals ===
17 July

==== Semifinal 1 ====
Rank	Name	Nationality	Time	Notes
1	Sanya Richards	United States	52.72	Q
2	Tatyana Popova	Russia	52.94	Q
3	Lisa Miller	United Kingdom	53.28	Q
4	Yemi Fagbamila	Nigeria	53.30	Q
5	Davita Prendergast	Jamaica	53.76	
5	Olga Tereshkova	Kazakhstan	53.76	
7	Kate Pedley	Australia	54.36	
8	Kundai Sengudzwa	Zimbabwe	55.13	

==== Semifinal 2 ====
Rank	Name	Nationality	Time	Notes
1	Monique Henderson	United States	52.31	Q
2	Sheryl Morgan	Jamaica	53.20	Q
3	Joanne Cuddihy	Ireland	53.77	Q
4	Mariya Dryakhlova	Russia	53.80	Q
5	Kim Wall	United Kingdom	54.05	
6	Ayden Ollivier	Canada	54.11	
7	Rebecca Irwin	Australia	54.45	
8	Kiza Francis	Trinidad and Tobago	55.63	

=== Heats ===
16 July

==== Heat 1 ====
Rank	Name	Nationality	Time	Notes
1	Tatyana Popova	Russia	53.46	Q
2	Joanne Cuddihy	Ireland	54.07	Q
3	Kim Wall	United Kingdom	54.18	Q
4	Davita Prendergast	Jamaica	54.65	q
5	Ursula Ellecosta	Italy	55.95	
6	Gabriela Ciuca	Romania	56.81	
7	Shifana Ali	Maldives	64.10	

==== Heat 2 ====
Rank	Name	Nationality	Time	Notes
1	Sheryl Morgan	Jamaica	54.14	Q
2	Rebecca Irwin	Australia	54.69	Q
3	Kundai Sengudzwa	Zimbabwe	55.08	Q
4	Olatunde Okusanya	Nigeria	55.11	
5	Ioana Ciurila	Romania	55.19	
6	Gabriela Medina	Mexico	56.05	

==== Heat 3 ====
Rank	Name	Nationality	Time	Notes
1	Monique Henderson	United States	52.81	Q
2	Yemi Fagbamila	Nigeria	54.12	Q
3	Olga Tereshkova	Kazakhstan	54.64	Q
4	Kiza Francis	Trinidad and Tobago	54.96	q
5	Patricia Mayers	Canada	55.40	
6	Tiandra Ponteen	Saint Kitts and Nevis	55.41	
7	Gretta Taslakian	Lebanon	57.34	

==== Heat 4 ====
Rank	Name	Nationality	Time	Notes
1	Sanya Richards	United States	53.14	Q
2	Lisa Miller	United Kingdom	54.39	Q
3	Mariya Dryakhlova	Russia	54.42	Q
4	Ayden Ollivier	Canada	54.47	q
5	Kate Pedley	Australia	54.67	q
6	Alyssa Kallinikou	Cyprus	55.36	
7	Deneb Cervantes	Mexico	55.66	

== Participation ==
According to an unofficial count, 27 athletes from 18 countries participated in the event.

- Australia (2)
- Canada (2)
- Cyprus (1)
- Ireland (1)
- Italy (1)
- Jamaica (2)
- Kazakhstan (1)
- Lebanon (1)
- Maldives (1)
- Mexico (2)
- Nigeria (2)
- Romania (2)
- Russia (2)
- Saint Kitts and Nevis (1)
- Trinidad and Tobago (1)
- United Kingdom (2)
- United States (2)
- Zimbabwe (1)
