= Shereefa Lloyd =

Jamaican sprinter (born 1982)

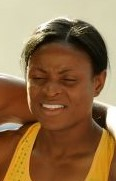
- Shereefa Lloyd during the World Championship Athletics 2009 in Berlin.

Personal information
- Born: 2 September 1982 (age 43)
- Height: 1.68 m (5 ft 6 in)
- Weight: 61 kg (134 lb)

Sport
- Country: Jamaica
- Sport: Athletics
- Event: 4 × 400m Relay
Medal record
Olympic Games
Silver medal – second place	2008 Beijing	4 × 400 m relay
Silver medal – second place	2012 London	4 × 400 m relay
World Championships
Silver medal – second place	2007 Osaka	4 × 400 m relay
Silver medal – second place	2009 Berlin	4 × 400 m relay
CAC Junior Championships (U20)
Gold medal – first place	2000 San Juan	4 × 100 m relay

Shereefa Lloyd (born 2 September 1982 in Clarendon Park, Jamaica) is a Jamaican sprinter, who specializes in the 400 metres.

She attended and competed for Texas Tech under coach Wes Kittley.

At the 2007 World Championships Lloyd won a bronze medal in 4 × 400 metres relay, together with teammates Shericka Williams, Davita Prendergast and Novlene Williams. She also reached the semi-final in the individual event, with a personal best time of 51.00 seconds. She was also part of the Jamaican teams that won the bronze medal at the 2008 and 2012 Summer Olympics.

== Achievements ==
Year	Competition	Venue	Position	Event	Notes
Representing Jamaica
2000	World Junior Championships	Santiago, Chile	1st (h)	4 × 100 m relay	44.26
2007	Pan American Games	Rio, Brazil	4th	400 m	51.19
2007	Pan American Games	Rio, Brazil	4th	4 × 400 m relay	3:28.74
2007	World Championships	Osaka, Japan	2nd	4 × 400 m relay	3:19.73
2008	Olympic Games	Beijing, China	7th	400 m	50.68
2008	Olympic Games	Beijing, China	2nd	4 × 400 m relay	3:20.40
2012	Olympic Games	London, United Kingdom	7th	400 m	50.79
2012	Olympic Games	London, United Kingdom	2nd	4 × 400 m relay	3:20.95

=== Personal bests ===
- 100 metres – 11.50 s (2003)
- 200 metres – 23.10 s (2004)
- 400 metres – 51.00 s (2007)
