= Athletics at the 2007 Pan American Games – Women's 4 × 400 metres relay =

Women's 4 × 400 metres relay at the Pan American Games

The women's 4 × 400 metres relay at the 2007 Pan American Games was held on July 28.

== Results ==
Rank	Nation	Athletes	Time	Notes
1st place, gold medalist(s)	Cuba	Aymée Martínez, Daimí Pernía, Zulia Calatayud, Indira Terrero	3:27.51	
2nd place, silver medalist(s)	Mexico	María Teresa Rugerio, Gabriela Medina, Zudikey Rodríguez, Ana Guevara	3:27.75	NR
3rd place, bronze medalist(s)	United States	Debbie Dunn, Angel Perkins, Latonia Wilson, Nicole Leach	3:27.84	
4	Jamaica	Ronetta Smith, Shereefa Lloyd, Anastasia Le-Roy, Davita Prendergast	3:28.74	
5	Brazil	Maria Laura Almirão, Emmily Pinheiro, Lucimar Teodoro, Josiane Tito	3:28.89	
6	Canada	Adrienne Power, Esther Akinsulie, Carline Muir, Diane Cummins	3:32.37	
7	Trinidad and Tobago	Janeil Bellille, Natalie Dixon, Melissa de Leon, Romona Modeste	3:39.67	
8	Ecuador	Yessica Perea, Lucy Jaramillo, Paola Sánchez, Erika Chávez	3:43.88	
