= 2009 World Championships in Athletics – Women's 4 × 400 metres relay =

The women's 4 × 400 metres relay at the 2009 World Championships in Athletics was held at the Olympic Stadium on August 22 and August 23.

== Medalists ==
Gold	Silver	Bronze
United States; Debbie Dunn; Allyson Felix; Lashinda Demus; Sanya Richards; Natasha Hastings*; Jessica Beard*	Jamaica; Rosemarie Whyte; Novlene Williams-Mills; Shereefa Lloyd; Shericka Williams; Kaliese Spencer*	Great Britain & N.I. Lee McConnell; Christine Ohuruogu; Vicki Barr; Nicola Sanders; Jenny Meadows*

* Runners who participated in the heats only and received medals.

**Original medalists Russia forfeited results and medals as a result of disqualification of Kapachinskaya.

== Records ==
Prior to the competition, the following records were as follows.

World record	Soviet Union (URS); Tatyana Ledovskaya, Olga Nazarova, Mariya Pinigina, Olga Bryzgina	3:15.17	Seoul, South Korea	1 October 1988
Championship record	United States (USA); Gwen Torrence, Jearl Miles Clark, Natasha Kaiser-Brown, Maicel Malone-Wallace	3:16.71	Stuttgart, Germany	22 August 1993
World Leading	United States (USA); Monica Hargrove, Natasha Hastings, Allyson Felix, Sanya Richards	3:23.08	Philadelphia, United States	25 April 2009
African Record	Nigeria (NGR); Falilat Ogunkoya, Fatima Yusuf, Olabisi Afolabi, Charity Opara	3:21.04	Atlanta, United States	3 August 1996
Asian Record	China (CHN); An Xiaohong, Bai Xiaoyun, Cao Chunying, Ma Yuqin	3:24.28	Beijing, China	13 September 1993
North American Record	United States (USA); Denean Howard-Hill, Diane Dixon, Valerie Brisco-Hooks, Florence Griffith Joyner	3:15.51	Seoul, South Korea	1 October 1988
South American record	Brazil (BRA); Lucimar Teodoro, Geisa Aparecida Coutinho, Maria Laura Almirão, Josiane Tito	3:26.82	Helsinki, Finland	13 August 2005
European Record	Soviet Union (URS); Tatyana Ledovskaya, Olga Nazarova, Mariya Pinigina, Olga Bryzgina	3:15.17	Seoul, South Korea	1 October 1988
Oceanian Record	Australia (AUS); Cathy Freeman, Melinda Gainsford-Taylor, Tamsyn Lewis, Nova Peris	3:23.81	Sydney, Australia	30 September 2000

No new world or championship record was set during this competition.

== Qualification standards ==
Standard
3:31.00

== Schedule ==
Date	Time	Round
August 22, 2009	20:15	Heats
August 23, 2009	17:50	Final

== Results ==
=== Heats ===
Qualification: First 3 of each heat (Q) plus the 2 fastest times (q) advance to the final.

Rank	Heat	Nation	Athletes	Time	Notes
1	2	Russia	Natalya Nazarova, Tatyana Firova, Natalya Antyukh, Lyudmila Litvinova	3:23.80	Q, SB
2	2	Jamaica	Kaliese Spencer, Shereefa Lloyd, Rosemarie Whyte, Novlene Williams-Mills	3:24.72	Q
3	2	Germany	Fabienne Kohlmann, Sorina Nwachukwu, Esther Cremer, Claudia Hoffmann	3:25.08	Q, SB
4	2	Great Britain & N.I.	Nicola Sanders, Vicki Barr, Jenny Meadows, Lee McConnell	3:25.23	q, SB
5	2	Cuba	Susana A. Clement, Daisurami Bonne, Zulia Calatayud, Indira Terrero	3:27.36	q, SB
6	2	Canada	Esther Akinsulie, Adrienne Power, Jenna Martin, Carline Muir	3:29.17	SB
7	1	United States	Debbie Dunn, Natasha Hastings, Jessica Beard, Sanya Richards	3:29.31	Q
8	1	Nigeria	Endurance Abinuwa, Muizat Ajoke Odumosu, Josephine Ehigie, Folashade Abugan	3:29.60	Q, SB
8	1	France	Virginie Michanol, Aurélie Kamga, Symphora Béhi, Solen Désert-Mariller	3:29.60	Q, SB
10	2	Ukraine	Yuliya Baraley, Tetiana Petlyuk, Anastasiya Rabchenyuk, Antonina Yefremova	3:30.76	
11	1	Australia	Pirrenee Steinert, Madeleine Pape, Caitlin Willis-Pincott, Tamsyn Lewis	3:30.80	
12	1	Italy	Marta Milani, Daniela Reina, Maria Enrica Spacca, Libania Grenot	3:31.05	
13	1	Brazil	Geisa Aparecida Coutinho, Emmilly Pinheiro, Sheila Ferreira, Jailma de Lima	3:31.42	
14	2	Japan	Sayaka Aoki, Asami Tanno, Mayu Sato, Satomi Kubokura	3:34.46	
15	1	Mexico	Alejandra Cherizola, Nallely Vela, Ruth Grajeda, Karla Dueñas	3:40.03	
	1	Bahamas	Sasha Rolle, Shakeitha Henfield, Rashan Brown, Katrina Seymour	DQ	

Key: DQ = Disqualified, Q = qualification by place in heat, q = qualification by overall place, SB = Seasonal best

=== Final ===
Rank	Nation	Athletes	Time	Notes
1st place, gold medalist(s)	United States	Debbie Dunn, Allyson Felix, Lashinda Demus, Sanya Richards	3:17.83	WL
2nd place, silver medalist(s)	Jamaica	Rosemarie Whyte, Novlene Williams-Mills, Shereefa Lloyd, Shericka Williams	3:21.15	SB
~~3~~	Russia	Anastasiya Kapachinskaya, Tatyana Firova, Lyudmila Litvinova, Antonina Krivoshapka	~~3:21.64~~	Doping
3rd place, bronze medalist(s)	Great Britain & N.I.	Lee McConnell, Christine Ohuruogu, Vicki Barr, Nicola Sanders	3:25.16	SB
4	Germany	Fabienne Kohlmann, Sorina Nwachukwu, Esther Cremer, Claudia Hoffmann	3:27.61	
5	Nigeria	Endurance Abinuwa, Muizat Ajoke Odumosu, Josephine Ehigie, Folasade Abugan	3:28.55	SB
6	France	Virginie Michanol, Aurélie Kamga, Symphora Béhi, Solen Désert-Mariller	3:30.16	
7	Cuba	Diosmely Peña, Daisurami Bonne, Zulia Calatayud, Indira Terrero	3:36.99	

Key: SB = Seasonal best, WL = World leading (in a given season)
