= Athletics at the 2003 Pan American Games – Women's 400 metres =

Women's 400 metres at the Pan American Games

The final of the Women's 400 metres event at the 2003 Pan American Games took place on Friday August 8, 2003, with the heats staged a day earlier. Hazel-Ann Regis won the only silver medal for Grenada at the 2003 Pan American Games.

== Medalists ==
Gold	Ana Guevara; Mexico
Silver	Hazel-Ann Regis; Grenada
Bronze	Aliann Pompey; Guyana

== Records ==
World Record	Marita Koch (GDR)	47.60	October 6, 1985	Canberra, Australia
Pan Am Record	Ana Fidelia Quirot (CUB)	49.61	August 5, 1991	Havana, Cuba

== Results ==
Rank	Athlete	Heats		Final
Rank	Athlete	Time	Rank	Time
1	Ana Guevara (MEX)	52.22	2	50.36
2	Hazel-Ann Regis (GRN)	52.21	1	51.56
3	Aliann Pompey (GUY)	52.23	3	52.06
4	Libania Grenot (CUB)	52.37	4	52.23
5	Me'Lisa Barber (USA)	52.62	5	52.53
6	Novlene Williams (JAM)	52.76	7	52.83
7	Moushami Robinson (USA)	52.23	6	52.96
8	Michelle Burgher (JAM)	53.13	8	53.26
9	Josiane Tito (BRA)	53.18	9	
10	Geisa Coutinho (BRA)	53.23	10	
11	Patricia Libia Rodríguez (COL)	53.41	11	
12	Mayra González (MEX)	53.53	12	
13	Adia McKinnon (TRI)	54.24	13	
14	Clara Hernández (DOM)	55.22	14	
15	Jackie-Ann Morain (GRN)	56.30	15	
16	Mirtha Brock (COL)	1:01.79	16	
—	Eliana Pacheco (VEN)	DNF	—	
—	Tonique Williams-Darling (BAH)	DNS	—	

== See also ==
- 2003 World Championships in Athletics – Women's 400 metres
- Athletics at the 2004 Summer Olympics – Women's 400 metres
