= 2003 World Championships in Athletics – Women's 4 × 400 metres relay =

These are the official results of the Women's 4 × 400 metres event at the 2003 IAAF World Championships in Paris, France. Their final was held on Sunday 31 August 2003 at 19:10h.

== Final ==
RANK	NATION	ATHLETES	TIME
	United States (USA)	• Me'Lisa Barber • Demetria Washington • Jearl Miles Clark • Sanya Richards	3:22.63
	Russia (RUS)	• Olesya Zykina • Yuliya Pechenkina • Anastasiya Kapachinskaya • Natalya Nazarova	3:22.91
	Jamaica (JAM)	• Sandie Richards • Allison Beckford • Ronetta Smith • Lorraine Fenton	3:22.92
4.	Germany (GER)	• Claudia Marx • Birgit Rockmeier • Claudia Hoffmann • Grit Breuer	3:26.25
5.	Poland (POL)	• Monika Bejnar • Małgorzata Pskit • Anna Jesień • Grażyna Prokopek	3:26.64
6.	Great Britain (GBR)	• Lee McConnell • Jennifer Meadows • Catherine Murphy • Tasha Danvers	3:26.67
7.	Cameroon (CMR)	• Mireille Nguimgo • Carole Kaboud Mebam • Delphine Atangana • Hortense Bewouda	3:27.08 (NR)
—	Senegal (SEN)	• Fatou Bintou Fall • Mame Tacko Diouf • Aminata Diouf • Amy Mbacké Thiam	DQ

== Heats ==
- Held on Saturday 30 August 2003

=== Heat 1 ===
RANK	NATION	ATHLETES	TIME
1.	Jamaica (JAM)	• Sandie Richards • Ronetta Smith • Michelle Burgher • Allison Beckford	3:26.22
2.	Great Britain (GBR)	• Helen Karagounis • Jennifer Meadows • Catherine Murphy • Lee McConnell	3:26.44
3.	Poland (POL)	• Anna Guzowska • Monika Bejnar • Anna Jesień • Grażyna Prokopek	3:26.66
4.	Greece (GRE)	• Hariklia Bouda • Fani Halkia • Georgia Koumnaki • Hrisoula Goudenoudi	3:33.88
5.	India (IND)	• Kalpana Reddy • Sathi Geetha • Sagardeep Kaur • Manjeet Kaur	3:42.25
—	Australia (AUS)	• Lauren Hewitt • Susan Andrews • Tamsyn Lewis • Jana Rawlinson	DNS

=== Heat 2 ===
RANK	NATION	ATHLETES	TIME
1.	Russia (RUS)	• Svetlana Pospelova • Svetlana Goncharenko • Olesya Zykina • Natalya Nazarova	3:27.97
2.	Cameroon (CMR)	• Mireille Nguimgo • Carole Kaboud Mebam • Delphine Atangana • Hortense Bewouda	3:29.40
3.	France (FRA)	• Marie-Louise Bévis • Anita Mormand • Virginie Michanol • Solen Désert	3:30.29
4.	Belarus (BLR)	• Katsiaryna Bobryk • Natallia Solohub • Iryna Khliustava • Sviatlana Usovich	3:31.40
5.	Italy (ITA)	• Danielle Perpoli • Monika Niederstatter • Maria Teresa Schutzmann • Virna De Angeli	3:32.00
6.	Bulgaria (BUL)	• Monika Gachevska • Mariyana Dimitrova • Ekaterina Maschova • Nedyalka Nedkova	3:33.92
—	Nigeria (NGR)	• Olabisi Afolabi • Doris Jacob • Oluyemi Fagbamila • Rosemary Okafor	DNS

=== Heat 3 ===
RANK	NATION	ATHLETES	TIME
1.	United States (USA)	• Me'Lisa Barber • DeeDee Trotter • Sanya Richards • Jearl Miles Clark	3:24.57
2.	Germany (GER)	• Claudia Marx • Birgit Rockmeier • Claudia Hoffmann • Grit Breuer	3:27.97
3.	Senegal (SEN)	• Fatou Bintou Fall • Mame Tacko Diouf • Aminata Diouf • Amy Mbacké Thiam	3:28.37
4.	Ukraine (UKR)	• Nataliya Pyhyda • Olga Mishchenko • Oleksandra Ryzhkova • Antonina Yefremova	3:29.65
5.	Mexico (MEX)	• Liliana Allen • Gabriela Medina • Mayra González • Ana Guevara	3:29.74
6.	Kazakhstan (KAZ)	• Tatyana Roslanova • Natalya Torshina • Olga Tereshkova • Svetlana Bodritskaya	3:31.20
7.	Israel (ISR)	• Irina Lenskiy • Svetlana Gnezdilov • Anat Morad • Anna Tkach	3:32.99 (NR)
