= Maria Teresa Schutzmann =

Italian sprinter

Personal information
- Nationality: Italian
- Born: 21 July 1979 (age 46)

Sport
- Country: Italy
- Sport: Athletics
- Event: Sprinting

Achievements and titles
- Personal bests: 200 m: 24.43 (2003); 400 m: 53.53 (2003)

Maria Teresa Schutzmann (born 21 July 1979) is an Italian retired female sprinter, which participated at the 2003 World Championships in Athletics.

== Achievements ==
Year	Competition	Venue	Position	Event	Time	Notes
2003	World Championships	(France) Paris	Heat	4x400 metres relay	3:32:00	
