= Oleksandra Ryzhkova =

Ukrainian sprinter

Oleksandra Ryzhkova (born 9 July 1980) is a Ukrainian sprinter who specializes in the 400 metres.

In the 4 x 400 metres relay she competed at the 2003 World Championships and the 2004 Olympic Games without reaching the final.

Her personal best time was 51.75 seconds in the 400 metres, achieved in May 2005 in Kyiv.
