= Gabriela Medina (sprinter) =

Mexican sprinter (born 1985)

Personal information
- Full name: Gabriela Elizabeth Medina Solórzano
- Born: 3 March 1985 (age 41) Guadalajara, Mexico
- Height: 1.60 m (5 ft 3 in)
- Weight: 55 kg (121 lb)

Sport
- Country: Mexico
- Sport: Athletics
- Events: Sprint and Middle-distance running
Medal record
Athletics
Representing Mexico
CAC Junior Championships (U20)
Bronze medal – third place	2000 San Juan	800 m
CAC Junior Championships (U17)
Bronze medal – third place	2000 San Juan	800 m
- Updated on 31 December 2014

Gabriela Elizabeth Medina Solórzano (born 3 March 1985 in Guadalajara, Jalisco) is a Mexican sprinter who specializes in the 400 metres.

== Personal bests ==
Her personal best time is 51.25 seconds, achieved in May 2007 in Xalapa.

Event	Result	Venue	Date
200 m	23.76 s A (wind: +0.1 m/s)	(Mexico) Xalapa	11 May 2008
400 m	51.25 s A	(Mexico) Xalapa	5 May 2007
800 m	2:01.50 min	(Puerto Rico) Mayagüez	17 Jul 2011

== Achievements ==
Year	Competition	Venue	Position	Event	Notes
Representing Mexico
2000	Central American and Caribbean Junior Championships (U-17)	San Juan, Puerto Rico	4th	400 m	57.10
2000	Central American and Caribbean Junior Championships (U-17)	San Juan, Puerto Rico	3rd	800 m	2:13.99
2000	NACAC Under-25 Championships	Monterrey, Mexico	7th	400 m	57.33
2000	NACAC Under-25 Championships	Monterrey, Mexico	3rd	4 × 400 m relay	3:49.83
2001	World Youth Championships	Debrecen, Hungary	15th (sf)	400m	56.32
2001	World Youth Championships	Debrecen, Hungary	—	Mixed medley relay	DQ
2002	Central American and Caribbean Junior Championships (U-20)	Bridgetown, Barbados	5th	400 m	55.26
2002	Central American and Caribbean Junior Championships (U-20)	Bridgetown, Barbados	3rd	800 m	2:10.35
2002	World Junior Championships	Kingston, Jamaica	24th (h)	400 m	56.05
2002	Central American and Caribbean Games	San Salvador, El Salvador	4th	400 m	54.40
2002	Central American and Caribbean Games	San Salvador, El Salvador	3rd	800 m	2:06.55
2002	Central American and Caribbean Games	San Salvador, El Salvador	1st	4 × 400 m relay	3:31.24
2003	Central American and Caribbean Championships	St. George's, Grenada	7th	400 m	53.55
2003	Central American and Caribbean Championships	St. George's, Grenada	4th	4 × 400 m	3:35.07
2003	Pan American Games	Santo Domingo, Dom. Rep.	15th (h)	800 m	2:10.69
2003	Pan American Games	Santo Domingo, Dom. Rep.	4th	4 × 400 m	3:28.23
2003	World Championships	Paris Saint-Denis, France	10th (h)	4 × 400 m relay	3:29.74
2004	World Junior Championships	Grosseto, Italy	25th (h)	400m	55.95
2004	World Junior Championships	Grosseto, Italy	—	4 × 100 m relay	DQ
2005	World Championships	Helsinki, Finland	11th (h)	4 × 400 m relay	3:31.41
2006	Ibero-American Championships	Ponce, Puerto Rico	2nd	800 m	2:03.43
2006	Ibero-American Championships	Ponce, Puerto Rico	1st	4 × 400 m	3:33.27
2006	NACAC Under-23 Championships	Santo Domingo, Dominican Republic	2nd	800m	2:05.02
2006	NACAC Under-23 Championships	Santo Domingo, Dominican Republic	2nd	4 × 400 m relay	3:41.66
2006	Central American and Caribbean Games	Cartagena, Colombia	3rd	800 m	2:06.15
2006	Central American and Caribbean Games	Cartagena, Colombia	1st	4 × 400 m	3:29.92
2007	Pan American Games	Rio de Janeiro, Brazil	9th (h)	400 m	52.22
2007	Pan American Games	Rio de Janeiro, Brazil	2nd	4 × 400 m	3:27.75
2007	World Championships	Osaka, Japan	30th (h)	400 m	53.16
2007	World Championships	Osaka, Japan	8th	4 × 400 m	3:29.14
2008	Ibero-American Championships	Iquique, Chile	5th	200 m	24.21 (wind: -0.5 m/s)
2008	Ibero-American Championships	Iquique, Chile	1st	4 × 400 m	3:33.27
2008	Central American and Caribbean Championships	Cali, Colombia	2nd	400 m	51.78
2008	Central American and Caribbean Championships	Cali, Colombia	2nd	4 × 400 m	3:29.94
2008	Olympic Games	Beijing, China	23rd (sf)	400 m	52.97
2008	Olympic Games	Beijing, China	14th (h)	4 × 400 m	3:30.36
2010	Ibero-American Championships	San Fernando, Spain	7th	800 m	2:05.50
2010	Ibero-American Championships	San Fernando, Spain	2nd	4 × 400 m	3:32.96
2010	Central American and Caribbean Games	Mayagüez, Puerto Rico	5th	800 m	2:07.57
2010	Central American and Caribbean Games	Mayagüez, Puerto Rico	—	4 × 400 m relay	DQ
2011	Central American and Caribbean Championships	Mayagüez, Puerto Rico	1st	800 m	2:01.50
2011	Central American and Caribbean Championships	Mayagüez, Puerto Rico	4th	4 × 400 m relay	3:35.12
2011	Pan American Games	Guadalajara, Mexico	2nd	800 m	2:04.41
2012	Ibero-American Championships	Barquisimeto, Venezuela	9th (h)	800 m	2:13.04
2013	Central American and Caribbean Championships	Morelia, Mexico	4th	800 m	52.90
2013	Central American and Caribbean Championships	Morelia, Mexico	4th	800 m	2:03.11
2013	Central American and Caribbean Championships	Morelia, Mexico	2nd	4 × 400 m	3:34.52
2014	IAAF World Relays	Nassau, Bahamas	8th	4 × 800 m	8:24.45
2014	Ibero-American Championships	São Paulo, Brazil	1st	800 m	2:03.17
2014	Pan American Sports Festival	Mexico City, Mexico	3rd	800m	2:04.47 A
2014	Central American and Caribbean Games	Xalapa, Mexico	3rd	800m	2:02.36 A
2014	Central American and Caribbean Games	Xalapa, Mexico	2nd	4 × 400 m relay	3:33.16 A
2015	NACAC Championships	San José, Costa Rica	2nd	800m	2:02.13
