= Geisa Coutinho =

Brazilian sprinter (born 1980)

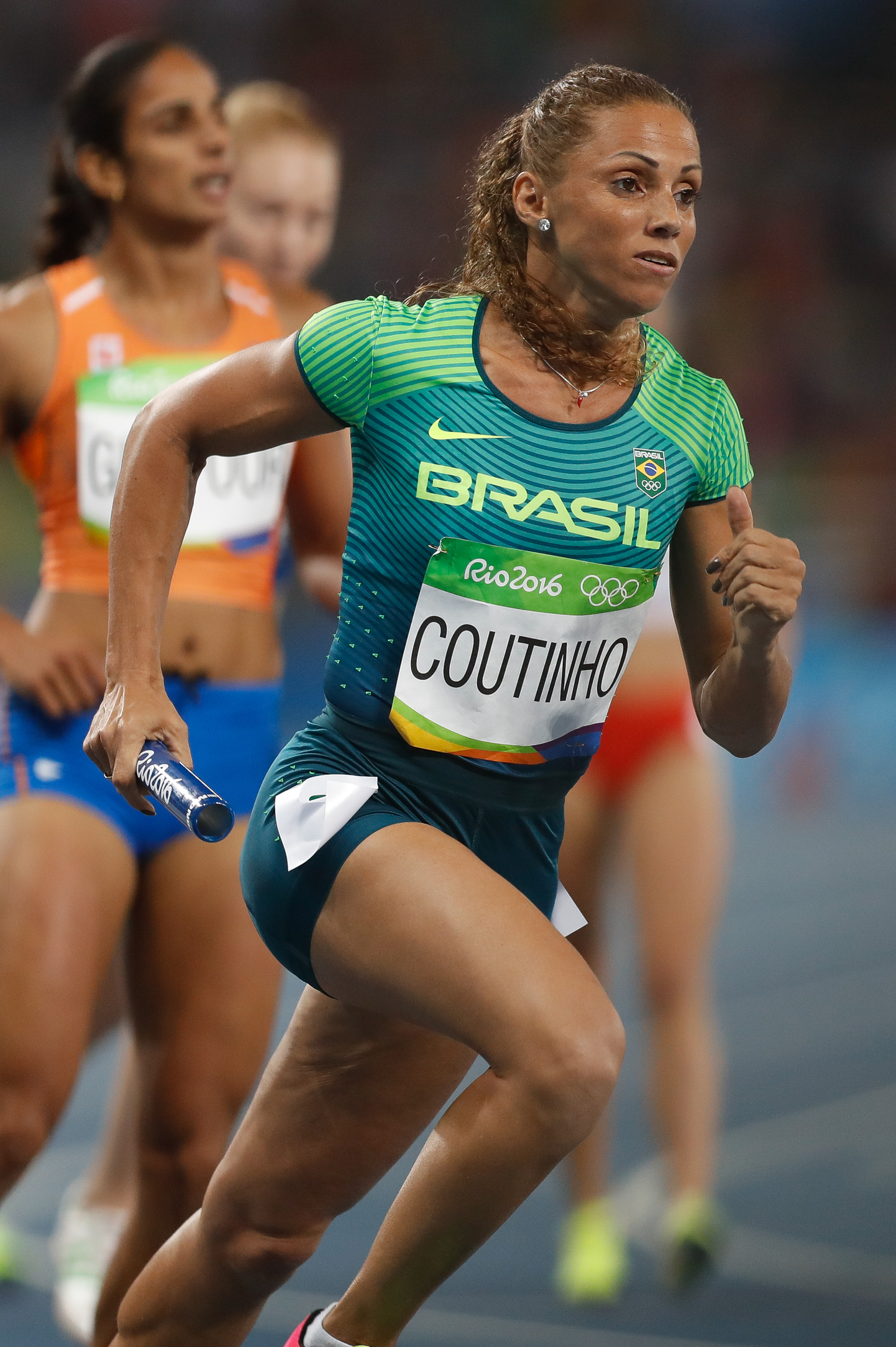
- Coutinho at the 2016 Olympics

Personal information
- Full name: Geisa Aparecida Muniz Coutinho
- Born: 1 June 1980 (age 46) Araruama, Rio de Janeiro, Brazil
- Height: 1.61 m (5 ft 3 in)
- Weight: 55 kg (121 lb)

Sport
- Country: Brazil
- Sport: Athletics
- Event: 4 × 400m Relay
Medal record
World Relays
Silver medal – second place	2021 Chorzów	4×400 m relay mixed
Military World Games
Gold medal – first place	2011 Rio de Janeiro	400 m
Gold medal – first place	2011 Rio de Janeiro	4×100 m relay
Gold medal – first place	2011 Rio de Janeiro	4×400 m relay
Pan American Games
Silver medal – second place	2011 Guadalajara	4×400 m relay
Bronze medal – third place	2003 Santo Domingo	4×400 m relay
Bronze medal – third place	2011 Guadalajara	400 m
South American Championships
Gold medal – first place	2003 Barquisimeto	400 m
Gold medal – first place	2003 Barquisimeto	4×400 m relay
Gold medal – first place	2005 Cali	4×400 m relay
Gold medal – first place	2011 Buenos Aires	4×400 m relay
Silver medal – second place	2005 Cali	400 m
Bronze medal – third place	2011 Buenos Aires	400 m
- Updated on 15 April 2014

Geisa Aparecida Muniz Coutinho (born 1 June 1980) is a Brazilian track and field athlete who competes in the 400 metres sprint. She represented Brazil at the 2004 Summer Olympics and at the 2012 Summer Olympics and is a four-time participant in the World Championships in Athletics (2003, 2005, 2009, and 2011). Her personal best in the 400 m is 51.08 seconds, and she holds the South American record of 3:26.68 minutes for the 4×400 metres relay.

She was the South American champion in the 400 m in 2003, the silver medallist in 2005, and the bronze medallist in 2011. She has won three South American titles with the Brazilian relay team and a bronze at the Pan American Games. At the 2011 Military World Games, she was a triple gold medallist, having won the 400 m, 4×100 m relay, and 4×400 m relay events.

== Career ==
Born in Araruama, she discovered athletics while at high school and tried the pole vault and sprinting events. She eventually focused solely on the 400 m and moved to Rio de Janeiro in order to train with the Vasco da Gama 16 sports club. She won her first Brazilian title in the 400 m in 2002 and took three consecutive victories at the annual event.

She made her world debut at the 2003 IAAF World Indoor Championships, running in the heats stage. Her first continental medals came at the 2003 South American Championships in Athletics, where she secured both the individual and relay 400 m titles for Brazil. She was also chosen for those events at the 2003 Pan American Games, and she helped Brazil to the bronze medal in the 4×400 metres relay. She made her outdoor global debut at the 2003 World Championships in Athletics, but was eliminated in the heats of the 400 m. In 2004, she won the bronze at the 2004 Ibero-American Championships and took a third Brazilian title. She was selected for the 400 m race and relay at the 2004 Athens Olympics but was eliminated in the first round of both events.

The following year she won the silver medal behind Maria Laura Almirão at the 2005 South American Championships in Athletics and joined her compatriot to win the relay gold. More relay success came at the 2005 World Championships in Athletics, as a team of Almirão, Coutinho, Josiane Tito and Lucimar Teodoro set a South American record time of 3:26.82 minutes in the heats, although they were disqualified in the final. She was a finalist in both the 200 metres and 400 m at the 2006 Ibero-American Championships, but she then disappeared from international competition with sub-par seasons in 2007 and 2008.

She joined the BM&F Bovespa sports club in 2009, coinciding with Coutinho's revival period. That year, she returned to international competition as she ran on the Brazilian relay team at the 2009 World Championships in Athletics. She won back-to-back 400 m national titles from 2010 to 2011. She also re-established herself at continental level, taking the 400 m bronze medal and relay gold at the 2011 South American Championships in Athletics. The 2011 Military World Games were held in her home state of Rio de Janeiro, and she provided one of the highlights for the hosts by winning the 400 m title in a personal best and Games record of 51.08 seconds. She won two further gold medals at the competition as she helped Brazil not only win the 4×400 m relay but also the 4×100 metres relay (in which she set another Games record). At the 2011 Brazilian championships, she ran a personal best of 23.07 seconds for the 200 m (later finishing third overall), won the 400 m race, and then set a South American record in the 4×400 m relay of 3:26.68 minutes with her club mates Bárbara de Oliveira, Joelma Sousa and Jailma de Lima.

== Personal bests ==
- 100 m: 11.55 (wind: -0.2 m/s) – São Paulo, Brazil, 16 April 2011
- 200 m: 23.07 (wind: +0.7 m/s) – São Paulo, Brazil, 7 August 2011
- 400 m: 51.08 – Rio de Janeiro, Brazil, 22 July 2011

== International competitions ==
Year	Competition	Venue	Position	Event	Notes
Representing Brazil
2002	Ibero-American Championships	Guatemala City, Guatemala	1st	4 × 400 m relay	3:33.13A
2003	World Indoor Championships	Birmingham, United Kingdom	21st (h)	400 m	54.23
2003	South American Championships	Barquisimeto, Venezuela	1st	400 m	51.81
2003	South American Championships	Barquisimeto, Venezuela	1st	4 × 400 m relay	3:28.64
2003	Pan American Games	Santo Domingo, Dominican Republic	10th (h)	400 m	53.23
2003	Pan American Games	Santo Domingo, Dominican Republic	3rd	4 × 400 m relay	3:28.07
2003	World Championships	Saint-Denis, France	7th (h)	400 m	53.31
2004	Ibero-American Championships	Huelva, Spain	3rd	400 m	52.42
2004	Olympic Games	Athens, Greece	28th (h)	400 m	52.18
2004	Olympic Games	Athens, Greece	12th (h)	4 × 400 m relay	3:28.43
2005	South American Championships	Cali, Colombia	2nd	400 m	52.94
2005	South American Championships	Cali, Colombia	1st	4 × 400 m relay	3:29.24
2005	World Championships	Helsinki, Finland	–	4 × 400 m relay	DQ
2006	Ibero-American Championships	Ponce, Puerto Rico	7th	200 m	24.02 (+0.7 m/s)
2006	Ibero-American Championships	Ponce, Puerto Rico	4th	400 m	53.66
2009	South American Championships	Lima, Peru	1st	4 × 400 m relay	3:32.69
2009	Lusophony Games	Lisbon, Portugal	1st	4 × 400 m relay	3:34.16
2009	World Championships	Berlin, Germany	13th (h)	4 × 400 m relay	3:31.42
2011	South American Championships	Buenos Aires, Argentina	3rd	400 m	52.84
2011	South American Championships	Buenos Aires, Argentina	1st	4 × 400 m relay	3:31.66
2011	Military World Games	Rio de Janeiro, Brazil	1st	400 m	51.08
2011	Military World Games	Rio de Janeiro, Brazil	1st	4x100 m relay	43.73
2011	Military World Games	Rio de Janeiro, Brazil	1st	4 × 400 m relay	3:32.42
2011	World Championships	Daegu, South Korea	14th (sf)	400 m	51.87
2011	World Championships	Daegu, South Korea	18th (h)	4x100 m relay	3:32.43
2011	Pan American Games	Guadalajara, Mexico	3rd	400 m	51.87
2011	Pan American Games	Guadalajara, Mexico	2nd	4 × 400 m relay	3:29.59
2012	World Indoor Championships	Istanbul, Turkey	–	400 m	DQ
2012	Ibero-American Championships	Barquisimeto, Venezuela	8th	200 m	23.66 (+0.9 m/s)
2012	Ibero-American Championships	Barquisimeto, Venezuela	2nd	400 m	52.66
2012	Ibero-American Championships	Barquisimeto, Venezuela	1st	4x100 m relay	43.90
2012	Ibero-American Championships	Barquisimeto, Venezuela	1st	4 × 400 m relay	3:28.56
2012	Olympic Games	London, United Kingdom	5th (h)	400 m	53.43
2012	Olympic Games	London, United Kingdom	7th (h)	4 × 400 m relay	3:32.95
2014	South American Games	Santiago, Chile	1st	400 m	51.81
2014	South American Games	Santiago, Chile	1st	4 × 400 m relay	3:35.07
2014	Ibero-American Championships	São Paulo, Brazil	1st	400 m	51.76
2014	Ibero-American Championships	São Paulo, Brazil	1st	4 × 400 m relay	3:29.66
2015	South American Championships	Lima, Peru	2nd (h) (Note: Did not start in the final.)	200 m	24.62 (-1.4 m/s)
2015	South American Championships	Lima, Peru	1st	400 m	53.07
2015	World Championships	Beijing, China	37th (h)	400 m	52.72
2016	Olympic Games	Rio de Janeiro, Brazil	25th (h)	400 m	52.05
2016	Olympic Games	Rio de Janeiro, Brazil	16th (h)	4 × 400 m relay	3:30.27
2017	IAAF World Relays	Nassau, Bahamas	1st (B)	4 × 400 m relay	3:34.68
2017	South American Championships	Asunción, Paraguay	1st	400 m	52.03
2017	South American Championships	Asunción, Paraguay	1st	4 × 400 m relay	3:33.00
2018	South American Games	Cochabamba, Bolivia	2nd	400 m	52.93
2018	Ibero-American Championships	Trujillo, Peru	2nd	400 m	52.57
2019	South American Championships	Lima, Peru	4th	400 m	53.51
2021	South American Championships	Guayaquil, Ecuador	4th	400 m	53.55
