= Ana Guevara =

Mexican athlete and politician

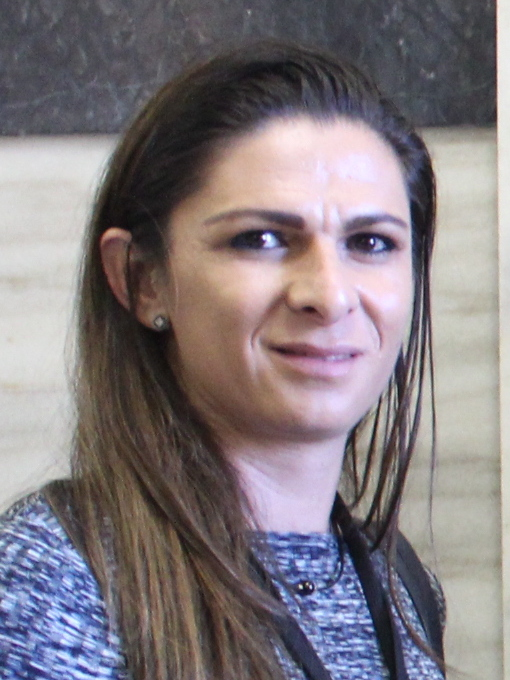
- Guevara in 2017

Personal information
- Born: March 4, 1977 (age 49) Nogales, Sonora, Mexico
- Occupations: Retired sprinter, politician

President of CONADE
- In office 1 December 2018 – 30 September 2024
- Preceded by: Alfredo Castillo Cervantes
- Succeeded by: Rommel Pacheco

Personal details
- Party: Labor Party
Medal record
Women's athletics
Olympic Games
Silver medal – second place	2004 Athens	400 m
World Championships
Gold medal – first place	2003 Paris	400 m
Bronze medal – third place	2001 Edmonton	400 m
Bronze medal – third place	2005 Helsinki	400 m
IAAF World Cup
Gold medal – first place	2002 Madrid	400 m
Gold medal – first place	2002 Madrid	4 × 400 m
Goodwill Games
Gold medal – first place	2001 Brisbane	400 m
Bronze medal – third place	2001 Brisbane	4 × 400 m
Pan American Games
Gold medal – first place	1999 Winnipeg	400 m
Gold medal – first place	2003 Santo Domingo	400 m
Gold medal – first place	2007 Rio de Janeiro	400 m
Silver medal – second place	2007 Rio de Janeiro	4 × 400 m
Central American and Caribbean Games
Silver medal – second place	1998 Maracaibo	400 metres
Silver medal – second place	1998 Maracaibo	800 metres
Gold medal – first place	2002 San Salvador	400 metres
Gold medal – first place	2002 San Salvador	4 × 400 m
Gold medal – first place	2006 Cartagena	400 metres
Gold medal – first place	2006 Cartagena	4 × 400 m
Ibero-American Championships
Gold medal – first place	1998 Lisbon	400 metres
Gold medal – first place	1998 Lisbon	4 × 400 metres
Silver medal – second place	1998 Lisbon	800 metres
CAC Junior Championships (U20)
Silver medal – second place	1996 San Salvador	800 m
Silver medal – second place	1996 San Salvador	4 × 400 m relay

Ana Gabriela Guevara Espinoza (born March 4, 1977) is a Mexican politician and former track and field athlete. She specialized in the 400 meters and is the 7th fastest female 300-meter runner in the world, running 300 meters in 35.3 seconds on May 3, 2003. She served as a Mexican Senator for the 2012–2018 term. She later served as the president of CONADE during the presidency of Andrés Manuel López Obrador between 2018 and 2024.

== Early life ==
Guevara was born in Nogales, Sonora. Her parents are Cesar Octavio Guevara and Ana María Espinoza. She has four siblings: Azalia, César, Daniela, and Jaime.

== Athletic career ==
Ana's career began in 1996 when she started participating in her first international competition. In 1998, she won two silver medals in the Central American and Caribbean Games in the 400 and 800 meters.

Her first major victory was the gold medal in the 400 meters at the 1999 Pan American Games in Canada. A year later, she qualified to the 2000 Sydney Olympics going to the 400 meters finals, finishing with a reasonable 5th place with a time of 49.96 seconds. After that race, she won 28 consecutive international races before a second-place finish in Rome in July 2004.

In 2001, she won the 400-meter race at the Herculis in Monaco, one of the two 400-meter events held at Golden League competitions that year. At the 2001 World Championships in Athletics, Guevara made the finals in the 400 m. She came off the last turn leading the race with about 105 meters to go. Unfortunately, she could not keep the fast pace and was passed by Amy Mbacké Thiam from Senegal and Lorraine Fenton from Jamaica with no more than 20 meters to go. Guevara won the bronze medal posting a season-best with a time of 49.97 seconds. In fact, Fenton and Mbacke Thiam also posted personal bests, the last one also being a national record.

In 2002, she won all seven competitions of 400 m of the Golden League (Oslo, Paris, Rome, Monaco, Zürich, Brussels and Berlin) sharing the jackpot of one million dollars in gold bars with three athletes. She also won the gold medal at the 2002 IAAF World Cup in 400 m and 400 m relay, running for the Americas team. She won the 2002 IAAF Grand Prix Final in Paris.

In 2003, she defended her title in the 400 m at the 2003 Pan American Games winning the gold medal. She won the 400-meter race at the Weltklasse Zürich, one of the two 400 m events held at Golden League competitions that year. Later, on August 27, 2003, in Paris, France, she won the 2003 World Championships in Athletics in the women's 400 meters. She set a personal record, a national record, and a world-leading time, finishing in 48.89 seconds. She won the 400 m at the 2003 IAAF World Athletics Final in Monaco.

Guevara made her second Olympic appearance in 2004 as the flag carrier for the Mexican delegation and represented her country in the 400 m. After winning her heat in the first round, and her corresponding semi-final, she would go on to win the silver medal in the final. This was Mexico's first Olympic medal in athletics outside of race walking. She won the 400 m at the 2004 IAAF World Athletics Final in Monaco.

A year later, at the 2005 World Championships in Athletics, she won the bronze medal in the 400 meters with a time of 49.81 seconds, despite the heavy rainfall that occurred during the event.

In 2007, for the third consecutive time, she won the gold medal in the 400 m at the 2007 Pan American Games. In addition, she led Mexico's 4 × 400 m relay team to a second-place finish. About a month later, at the age of 30, Guevara participated in her fourth World Championships in Athletics in Osaka, Japan. She finished in fourth place with a season-best time of 50.16 seconds, just 0.01 seconds ahead of 24-year-old DeeDee Trotter of the United States.

On January 16, 2008, she announced her retirement from all competitions due to conflicts with Mariano Lara, the then president of the Mexican Athletics Federation. No help was received at that time from Carlos Hermosillo, director of the CONADE (Comision Nacional de Cultura Fisica y Deporte), who did not act rapidly and the problem only grew bigger and continued for months. Ana finally said, "My retirement from sport in Mexico is now definitive, I contemplated the possibility of participating independently at the Olympic Games, but my dream was to participate for my country."

== Political career ==
In 2009, Guevara entered politics. She stood as the Party of the Democratic Revolution (PRD) candidate for the borough of Miguel Hidalgo in Mexico City but ultimately lost to Demetrio Sodi from the National Action Party (PAN).

In the 2012 general election she won a seat in the Senate on a ticket comprising the PRD, the Labor Party (PT), and the Citizens' Movement party. At the end of her Senate term, she won a seat in the Chamber of Deputies in the 2018 general election, representing Sonora's second district for the PT.

On December 13, 2016, near Mexico City, Guevara was struck by a car while riding her motorcycle and was then physically beaten by the four men who were in the car. News outlets created a national outrage over this incident.

== Allegations of corruption ==
In May 2020, Guevara, while serving as president of CONADE under Andrés Manuel López Obrador's presidency, was accused by the Superior Auditor of the Federation for allegedly requesting bribes in exchange for contracts to supply food for athletes and trainers from August 2019 to December 2019.

In February 2024, the Attorney General of Mexico reportedly opened two investigations into Guevara.

In October 2024, president Claudia Sheinbaum replaced Guevara's position as the president of CONADE with politician and ex diver Rommel Pacheco.

== Personal bests ==
Date	Event	Venue	Time
2003	300 m	Mexico City, Mexico	35.30 WB
2003	400 m	Paris, France	48.89 NR
2000	4 × 400 m	Osaka, Japan	3:27.14 NR
1998	800 m	Maracaibo, Venezuela	2:01.12 NR

== Achievements ==
Representing Mexico
Year	Competition	Venue	Position	Event	Notes
1996	Ibero-American Championships	Medellín, Colombia	7th	400 m	54.92
1996	Ibero-American Championships	Medellín, Colombia	3rd	4 × 400 m relay	3:38.48
1996	Central American and Caribbean; Junior Championships (U-20)	San Salvador, El Salvador	4th	400 m	56.03
1996	Central American and Caribbean; Junior Championships (U-20)	San Salvador, El Salvador	2nd	800 m	2:09.8
1996	Central American and Caribbean; Junior Championships (U-20)	San Salvador, El Salvador	2nd	4 × 400 m relay	3:47.96
1996	World Junior Championships	Sydney, Australia	12th (sf)	400 m	55.24
1997	Universiade	Catania, Italy	6th	800 m	2:02.90
1997	Universiade	Catania, Italy	7th	4 × 400 m relay	3:34.63
1998	Ibero-American Championships	Lisbon, Portugal	1st	400 m	50.65
1998	Ibero-American Championships	Lisbon, Portugal	1st	800 m	2:01.55
1998	Ibero-American Championships	Lisbon, Portugal	1st	4 × 400 m relay	3:33.41
1998	Central American and Caribbean Games	Maracaibo, Venezuela	2nd	400 m	51.32
1998	Central American and Caribbean Games	Maracaibo, Venezuela	2nd	800 m	2:01.12 NR
1998	Central American and Caribbean Games	Maracaibo, Venezuela	4th	4 × 400 m relay	3:34.37
1999	Pan American Games	Winnipeg, Canada	1st	400 m	50.91
1999	Pan American Games	Winnipeg, Canada	7th	4 × 400 m relay	3:35.86
1999	World Championships	Seville, Spain	12th (sf)	400 m	50.70
2000	Olympic Games	Sydney, Australia	5th	400 m	49.96
2000	Grand Prix Final	Doha, Qatar	5th	400 m	51.22
2001	Golden League Competitions	Monaco	1st	400 m	50.84
2001	World Championships	Edmonton, Canada	3rd	400 m	49.97
2002	Central American and Caribbean Games	San Salvador, El Salvador	1st	400 m	51.87
2002	Central American and Caribbean Games	San Salvador, El Salvador	1st	4 × 400 m relay	3:31.24
2002	Golden League Competitions	Oslo, Norway	1st	400 m	50.45
2002	Golden League Competitions	Paris, France	1st	400 m	50.00
2002	Golden League Competitions	Rome, Italy	1st	400 m	49.51
2002	Golden League Competitions	Monaco	1st	400 m	49.25
2002	Golden League Competitions	Zurich, Switzerland	1st	400 m	49.16
2002	Golden League Competitions	Brussels, Belgium	1st	400 m	49.69
2002	Golden League Competitions	Berlin, Germany	1st	400 m	49.91
2002	Grand Prix Final	Paris, France	1st	400 m	49.90
2003	Pan American Games	Santo Domingo, Dominican Republic	1st	400 m	50.36
2003	Golden League Competitions	Zürich, Switzerland	1st	400 m	49.11
2003	World Championships	Paris, France	1st	400 m	48.89 WL
2003	World Championships	Paris, France	10th (h)	4 × 400 m relay	3:29.74
2003	2003 IAAF World Athletics Final	Monaco	1st	400 m	49.34
2004	Golden League Competitions	Rome, Italy	2nd	400 m	49.74
2004	Golden League Competitions	Zurich, Switzerland	2nd	400 m	50.18
2004	Golden League Competitions	Brussels, Belgium	2nd	400 m	49.95
2004	Golden League Competitions	Berlin, Germany	2nd	400 m	49.53
2004	Olympic Games	Athens, Greece	2nd	400 m	49.56
2004	Olympic Games	Athens, Greece	11th (h)	4 × 400 m relay	3:27.88 NR
2004	World Athletics Final	Monaco	1st	400 m	50.13
2005	Golden League Competitions	Paris, France	3rd	400 m	50.44
2005	Golden League Competitions	Rome, Italy	2nd	400 m	50.62
2005	World Championships	Helsinki, Finland	3rd	400 m	49.81
2006	Central American and Caribbean Games	Cartagena, Colombia	1st	400 m	50.99
2006	Central American and Caribbean Games	Cartagena, Colombia	1st	4 × 400 m relay	3:29.92
2006	Golden League Competitions	Paris, France	4th	400 m	50.79
2006	Golden League Competitions	Rome, Italy	5th	400 m	50.43
2007	Pan American Games	Rio de Janeiro, Brazil	1st	400 m	50.34
2007	Pan American Games	Rio de Janeiro, Brazil	2nd	4 × 400 m relay	3:27.75 NR
2007	World Championships	Osaka, Japan	4th	400 m	50.16
2007	World Championships	Osaka, Japan	8th	4 × 400 m relay	3:29.14
