= Anna Tkach =

Israeli sprinter

Personal information
- Native name: Анна Ткач
- Citizenship: Israel
- Born: April 17, 1975 (age 51)

Sport
- Sport: Track
- Event: 400 metres
Medal record
Representing Russia
Summer Universiade
Silver medal – second place	1999 Palma de Mallorca	4x400m relay

Anna Tkach (Hebrew: 'אנה טקץ, Russian: Анна Ткач; born 17 April 1975) is a retired Russian-born Israeli sprinter who specialized in the 400 metres.

Tkach is Jewish, and was a Russian citizen until 2003 when she changed nationality to Israel. She competed for her new country in the 400 metres at the 2003 World Championships, reaching the semi-final. She also competed in the 4 x 400 metres relay.

Her personal best times were 11.45 seconds in the 100 metres, achieved in June 1999 in Moscow; 23.07 seconds in the 200 metres, achieved in June 1999 in Moscow; and 50.67 seconds in the 400 metres, achieved in July 2000 in Tula. She also holds the current Israeli record in the 400 metres at 52.06.

== See also ==
- List of Israeli records in athletics
- Sports in Israel
