= 2003 World Championships in Athletics – Women's 400 metres =

These are the official results of the Women's 400 metres event at the 2003 IAAF World Championships in Paris, France. There were a total number of 37 participating athletes, with five qualifying heats, three semi-finals and the final held on Wednesday 27 August 2003 at 21:50h.

== Final ==
RANK	FINAL	TIME
	Ana Guevara (MEX)	48.89
	Lorraine Fenton (JAM)	49.43
	Amy Mbacké Thiam (SEN)	49.95
4.	Natalya Nazarova (RUS)	49.98
5.	Tonique Williams-Darling (BAH)	50.38
6.	Olesya Zykina (RUS)	50.59
7.	Lee McConnell (GBR)	51.07
8.	Svetlana Pospelova (RUS)	51.30

== Semi-final ==
- Held on Monday 25 August 2003

RANK	HEAT 1	TIME
1.	Amy Mbacké Thiam (SEN)	50.78
2.	Svetlana Pospelova (RUS)	50.84
3.	Lee McConnell (GBR)	51.06
4.	Sanya Richards (USA)	51.32
5.	Olabisi Afolabi (NGR)	51.38
6.	Ronetta Smith (JAM)	51.39
7.	Heide Seyerling (RSA)	51.89
8.	Hazel-Ann Regis (GRN)	51.95

RANK	HEAT 2	TIME
1.	Tonique Williams-Darling (BAH)	50.43
2.	Lorraine Fenton (JAM)	50.45
3.	Olesya Zykina (RUS)	50.96
4.	Demetria Washington (USA)	51.31
5.	DeeDee Trotter (USA)	51.68
6.	Grażyna Prokopek (POL)	51.89
7.	Makelesi Batimala (FIJ)	52.27
8.	Antonina Yefremova (UKR)	53.19

RANK	HEAT 3	TIME
1.	Ana Guevara (MEX)	50.68
2.	Natalya Nazarova (RUS)	50.92
3.	Mireille Nguimgo (CMR)	51.19
4.	Sviatlana Usovich (BLR)	51.46
5.	Sandie Richards (JAM)	51.80
6.	Christine Amertil (BAH)	51.85
7.	Anna Tkach (ISR)	52.25
8.	Karen Shinkins (IRL)	52.74

== Heats ==
Held on Sunday 24 August 2003

RANK	HEAT 1	TIME
1.	Ana Guevara (MEX)	51.14
2.	Sviatlana Usovich (BLR)	51.39
3.	Olabisi Afolabi (NGR)	51.47
4.	Mireille Nguimgo (CMR)	51.65
5.	Karen Shinkins (IRL)	52.06
6.	Sandrine Thiébaud-Kangni (TOG)	52.50 (NR)
7.	Geisa Aparecida Coutinho (BRA)	53.31

RANK	HEAT 2	TIME
1.	Natalya Nazarova (RUS)	51.09
2.	Christine Amertil (BAH)	51.72
3.	Sandie Richards (JAM)	51.86
4.	Antonina Yefremova (UKR)	51.91
5.	Anna Tkach (ISR)	52.06 (NR)
6.	DeeDee Trotter (USA)	52.17
7.	Irisca Kithouka (CGO)	1:00.04

RANK	HEAT 3	TIME
1.	Tonique Williams-Darling (BAH)	51.24
2.	Olesya Zykina (RUS)	51.32
3.	Demetria Washington (USA)	51.53
4.	Hazel-Ann Regis (GRN)	51.97
5.	Hrisoula Goudenoudi (GRE)	52.33
6.	Solen Désert-Mariller (FRA)	52.41
7.	Aida Torosyan (ARM)	58.02
8.	Wai Kuan Hoi (MAC)	1:00.75

RANK	HEAT 4	TIME
1.	Lorraine Fenton (JAM)	50.90
2.	Svetlana Pospelova (RUS)	51.00
3.	Lee McConnell (GBR)	51.67
4.	Makelesi Batimala (FIJ)	52.01
5.	Aliann Pompey (GUY)	52.21
6.	Fatou Bintou Fall (SEN)	52.35
7.	Eliana Pacheco (VEN)	54.32

RANK	HEAT 5	TIME
1.	Amy Mbacké Thiam (SEN)	50.86
2.	Sanya Richards (USA)	51.00
3.	Grażyna Prokopek (POL)	51.36
4.	Ronetta Smith (JAM)	51.62
5.	Heide Seyerling (RSA)	52.18
6.	Claudia Marx (GER)	52.30
7.	Lilian Bwalya (ZAM)	56.84
8.	Shifana Ali (MDV)	1:01.74
