= Sheryl Morgan =

Jamaican sprinter (born 1983)

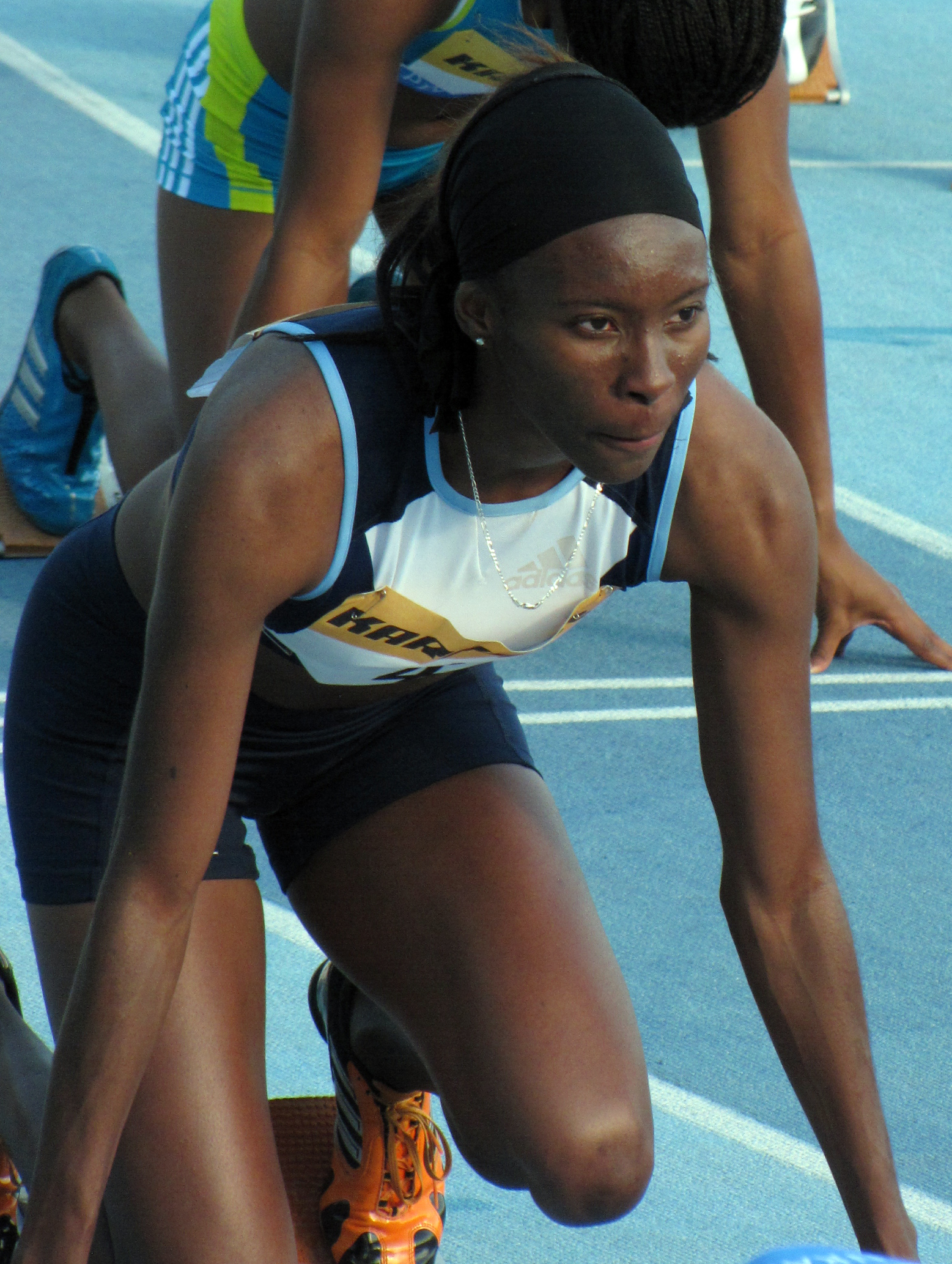

Personal information
- Born: 6 November 1983 (age 43) Manchester Parish, Jamaica

Sport
- Sport: Track and field
Medal record
Athletics
Representing Jamaica
World Indoor Championships
| Silver medal – second place | 2003 Birmingham | 4x400m relay |
World U20 Championships
| Silver medal – second place | 2000 Santiago | 4x400m relay |
| Bronze medal – third place | 2002 Kingston | 400m |
CAC Junior Championships (U20)
| Gold medal – first place | 2000 San Juan | 4x400 m relay |
| Gold medal – first place | 2002 Bridgetown | 400 m |
| Gold medal – first place | 2002 Bridgetown | 4x400 m relay |
| Silver medal – second place | 2000 San Juan | 400 m |
CARIFTA Games Junior (U20)
| Gold medal – first place | 2001 Bridgetown | 400m |
| Gold medal – first place | 2002 Nassau | 400 m |
| Gold medal – first place | 2002 Nassau | 4x400 m relay |
| Silver medal – second place | 2000 St. George's | 400m |

Sheryl Morgan (born 6 November 1983) is a Jamaican sprinter, who specializes in the 400 metres. She was born in Manchester, Jamaica.

Morgan won a bronze medal at the 2002 World Junior Championships. In the 4 x 400 metres relay she won the silver medal at the 2003 World Indoor Championships and the 2000 World Junior Championships and finished fourth at the 2002 World Junior Championships.

Morgan competed for the Nebraska Cornhuskers track and field team in the NCAA.

Her personal best time is 52.31 seconds, achieved in June 2001 in Nassau.

== Achievements ==
| Year | Competition | Venue | Position | Event | Notes |
Representing Jamaica
| 2000 | World Junior Championships | Santiago, Chile | 6th (sf) | 400m | 53.64 |
| 2000 | World Junior Championships | Santiago, Chile | 2nd | 4 × 400 m relay | 3:33.99 |
| 2002 | World Junior Championships | Kingston, Jamaica | 3rd | 400m | 52.61 |
| 2002 | World Junior Championships | Kingston, Jamaica | 4th | 4 × 400 m relay | 3:31.90 |
| 2002 | Central American and Caribbean Games | San Salvador, El Salvador | 5th | 400m hurdles | 58.66 |
| 2002 | Central American and Caribbean Games | San Salvador, El Salvador | 4th | 4 × 400 m relay | 3:38.90 |
