= Botswana at the 2009 World Championships in Athletics =

- WA code: BOT

in Berlin
- Competitors: 5 (4 men, 1 woman)
- Medals: Gold 0 Silver 0 Bronze 0 Total 0

World Championships in Athletics appearances
- 1983; 1987; 1991; 1993; 1995; 1997; 1999; 2001; 2003; 2005; 2007; 2009; 2011; 2013; 2015; 2017; 2019; 2022; 2023

Botswana competes at the 2009 World Championships in Athletics from 15–23 August in Berlin.

== Team selection ==
Track and road events

Event	Athletes	
Event	Men	Women
200 metres	Fanuel Kenosi	
400 metres	Isaac Makwala	Amantle Montsho

Field and combined events

Event	Athletes	
Event	Men	Women
High jump	Kabelo Kgosiemang	
Long jump	Gable Garenamotse	

== Results ==
=== Men ===
Track and road events

Event	Athletes	Heats		Quarterfinal		Semifinal		Final	
Event	Athletes	Result	Rank	Result	Rank	Result	Rank	Result	Rank
200 m	Fanuel Kenosi	21.75 SB	53	did not advance					
400 m	Isaac Makwala	46.45	34	-		did not advance			

Field and combined events

Event	Athletes	Qualification		Final	
Event	Athletes	Result	Rank	Result	Rank
High jump	Kabelo Kgosiemang	2.30 SB	3	2.18	13
Long jump	Gable Garenamotse	8.03	11	8.06	7

=== Women ===
Track and road events

Event	Athletes	Heats		Semifinal		Final	
Event	Athletes	Result	Rank	Result	Rank	Result	Rank
400 m	Amantle Montsho	50.65	1	49.89 SB	4	50.65	8
