= 2002 IAAF Golden League =

Athletics competition series

The 2002 IAAF Golden League was the fifth edition of the annual international track and field meeting series, held from 28 June to 6 September. It was contested at seven European meetings: the Bislett Games, Meeting Gaz de France, Golden Gala, Herculis, Weltklasse Zürich, Memorial Van Damme and the Internationales Stadionfest (ISTAF).

The Golden League jackpot consisted of one million US dollars' worth of gold bars. The jackpot was available to athletes who won all seven competitions of the series in one of the twelve specified events (divided equally between the sexes) and participated at the 2002 IAAF Grand Prix Final. The jackpot events for 2002 were: 100 metres for men and women, women's 400 metres, 1500 metres for men and women, 3000 metres/5000 metres for men and women, women's 100 metres hurdles, men's 400 metres hurdles, men's pole vault, men's triple jump and women's javelin throw.

The prize was shared among four athletes who won all seven events: Morocco's Hicham El Guerrouj, Felix Sánchez of the Dominican Republic, American Marion Jones and Mexico's Ana Guevara. Marion Jones's results were later annulled after she admitted to doping. Gail Devers came close to winning the jackpot, taking 100 m hurdles victories at all competitions except for Zurich, where she was beaten by Glory Alozie.

== Results ==
	Bislett Games 28 June	Meeting Gaz de France 5 July	Golden Gala 12 July	Herculis 19 July	Weltklasse Zürich 16 August	Memorial Van Damme 30 August	ISTAF 6 September
Men
100 m	Dwain Chambers (GBR)	Maurice Greene (USA)	Maurice Greene (USA)	Maurice Greene (USA)	Tim Montgomery (USA)	Tim Montgomery (USA)	Dwain Chambers (GBR)
200 m	—	—	Frank Fredericks (NAM)	—	—	Coby Miller (USA)	—
400 m	Leonard Byrd (USA)	—	Michael Blackwood (JAM)	—	—	—	Michael Blackwood (JAM)
800 m	—	David Krummenacker (USA)	David Krummenacker (USA)	Wilson Kipketer (DEN)	Joseph Mutua (KEN)	Wilson Kipketer (DEN)	Wilfred Bungei (KEN)
1500 m Mile	Hicham El Guerrouj (MAR)	Hicham El Guerrouj (MAR)	Hicham El Guerrouj (MAR)	Hicham El Guerrouj (MAR)	Hicham El Guerrouj (MAR)	Hicham El Guerrouj (MAR)	Hicham El Guerrouj (MAR)
3000 m/ 5000 m	Benjamin Limo (KEN)	Benjamin Limo (KEN)	Salah Hissou (MAR)	Benjamin Limo (KEN)	Sammy Kipketer (KEN)	Abderrahim Goumri (MAR)	Luke Kipkosgei (KEN)
10,000 metres	—	—	—	—	—	Sammy Kipketer (KEN)	—
110 m hurdles	—	Anier García (CUB)	—	Larry Wade (USA)	—	—	—
400 m hurdles	Felix Sánchez (DOM)	Felix Sánchez (DOM)	Felix Sánchez (DOM)	Felix Sánchez (DOM)	Felix Sánchez (DOM)	Felix Sánchez (DOM)	Felix Sánchez (DOM)
3000 m s'chase	—	Ezekiel Kemboi (KEN)	—	Brahim Boulami (MAR)	Stephen Cherono (KEN)	Ezekiel Kemboi (KEN)	—
Pole vault	Tim Mack (USA)	Romain Mesnil (FRA)	Tim Lobinger (GER)	Jeff Hartwig (USA)	Lars Börgeling (GER)	Alexander Averbukh (ISR)	Alexander Averbukh (ISR)
High jump	Tomáš Janku (CZE)	—	Mark Boswell (CAN)	—	Stefan Holm (SWE)	—	—
Triple jump	Jonathan Edwards (GBR)	Jonathan Edwards (GBR)	Walter Davis (USA)	Christian Olsson (SWE)	Jonathan Edwards (GBR)	Walter Davis (USA)	Christian Olsson (SWE)
Javelin throw	Boris Henry (GER)	—	—	—	—	Boris Henry (GER)	Boris Henry (GER)
Discus throw	—	—	—	—	Róbert Fazekas (HUN)	—	—
Hammer throw	—	—	Igor Astapkovich (BLR)	—	—	—	—
Women
100 m	Marion Jones (USA)	Marion Jones (USA)	Marion Jones (USA)	Marion Jones (USA)	Marion Jones (USA)	Marion Jones (USA)	Marion Jones (USA)
200 m	—	Kelli White (USA)	—	—	—	Marion Jones (USA)	—
400 m	Ana Guevara (MEX)	Ana Guevara (MEX)	Ana Guevara (MEX)	Ana Guevara (MEX)	Ana Guevara (MEX)	Ana Guevara (MEX)	Ana Guevara (MEX)
800 metres	Zulia Calatayud (CUB)	—	—	Zulia Calatayud (CUB)	Maria Mutola (MOZ)	Maria Mutola (MOZ) (1000 m)	—
1500 m	Maria Cioncan (ROM)	Nicole Teter (USA)	Maria Mutola (MOZ)	Regina Jacobs (USA)	Gabriela Szabo (ROM)	Süreyya Ayhan (TUR)	Süreyya Ayhan (TUR)
3000 m/ 5000 m	Gabriela Szabo (ROM)	Gabriela Szabo (ROM)	Edith Masai (KEN)	Gabriela Szabo (ROM)	Berhane Adere (ETH)	Berhane Adere (ETH)	Berhane Adere (ETH)
100 m hurdles	Gail Devers (USA)	Gail Devers (USA)	Gail Devers (USA)	Gail Devers (USA)	Glory Alozie (ESP)	Gail Devers (USA)	Gail Devers (USA)
400 m hurdles	—	Jana Pittman (AUS)	—	—	—	—	—
Pole vault	—	—	—	Svetlana Feofanova (RUS)	—	—	—
High jump	—	Kajsa Bergqvist (SWE)	—	—	—	Kajsa Bergqvist (SWE)	—
Long jump	—	—	—	—	Maurren Maggi (BRA)	—	Heike Drechsler (GER)
Triple jump	—	—	Huang Qiuyan (CHN)	—	—	—	—
Shot put	—	—	Astrid Kumbernuss (GER)	—	—	—	—
Javelin throw	Osleidys Menéndez (CUB)	Tatyana Shikolenko (RUS)	Osleidys Menéndez (CUB)	Tatyana Shikolenko (RUS)	Tatyana Shikolenko (RUS)	Nikolett Szabo (HUN)	Osleidys Menéndez (CUB)
