= Solen Désert-Mariller =

French sprinter (born 1982)

Solen Désert-Mariller (born 2 August 1982) is a French sprinter who specializes in the 400 metres.

She was born in Brest. She competed in the 200 metres at the 2003 World Indoor Championships, and then in the 400 metres at the 2003 World Championships, the 2005 World Championships, the 2006 European Championships, the 2007 World Championships and the 2009 World Championships without reaching the final. She won the bronze medal at the 2005 Jeux de la Francophonie.

In the 4 x 400 metres relay she finished fifth at the 2002 European Championships, seventh at the 2006 European Championships and seventh at the 2009 World Championships, and also competed at the 2003 World Championships, the 2007 World Championships and the 2008 Olympic Games.

Her personal best times are 23.02 seconds in the 200 metres, achieved in June 2005 in Lamballe; and 51.42 seconds in the 400 metres, achieved in August 2007 in Niort.
