= Hazel-Ann Regis =

Grenadian sprinter

Personal information
- Born: 1 February 1981 (age 45)

Sport
- Sport: Track and field
- Club: LSU Tigers
Medal record
Representing Grenada
Pan American Games
Silver medal – second place	2003 Santo Domingo	400m
Central American and Caribbean Games
Silver medal – second place	2006 Cartagena	400m
CAC Junior Championships (U20)
Gold medal – first place	2000 San Juan	400 m
Silver medal – second place	2000 San Juan	4x400 m relay
Silver medal – second place	1998 George Town	400 m
CARIFTA Games Junior (U20)
Gold medal – first place	2000 St. George's	400m
Silver medal – second place	1998 Port of Spain	400m
CARIFTA Games Youth (U17)
Bronze medal – third place	1997 Bridgetown	400m

Hazel-Ann Regis (born 1 February 1981) is a retired Grenadian sprinter who specialized in the 400 metres.

She participated at the World Championships in Athletics in 1999, 2003 and 2005 as well as the Summer Olympics in 2000 and 2004, without reaching the final.

Competing for the LSU Lady Tigers track and field team, Regis won the 2004 NCAA Division I Outdoor Track and Field Championships title in the 4 × 400 m relay.

Her personal best time is 50.64 seconds, achieved in May 2004 in Oxford.

== Competition record ==
Year	Competition	Venue	Position	Event	Notes
Representing Grenada
1997	CARIFTA Games (U17)	Bridgetown, Barbados	3rd	400 m	56.04
1998	CARIFTA Games (U20)	Port of Spain, Trinidad and Tobago	2nd	400 m	52.83
1998	Central American and Caribbean Junior Championships (U20)	Georgetown, Cayman Islands	2nd	400 m	54.51
1998	World Junior Championships	Annecy, France	25th (qf)	200 m	24.56 (wind: +0.7 m/s)
1998	World Junior Championships	Annecy, France	23rd (h)	400 m	55.55
1999	Pan American Junior Championships	Tampa, United States	5th	400 m	53.77
1999	World Championships	Seville, Spain	48th (h)	400 m	57.64
2000	CARIFTA Games (U20)	St. George's, Grenada	1st	400 m	53.29
2000	Central American and Caribbean Junior Championships (U20)	San Juan, Puerto Rico	1st	400 m	53.32
2000	Central American and Caribbean Junior Championships (U20)	San Juan, Puerto Rico	2nd	4x400 m	3:40.24
2000	Olympic Games	Sydney, Australia	48th (h)	400 m	55.11
2000	World Junior Championships	Santiago, Chile	20th (h)	400m	56.33
2002	Commonwealth Games	Manchester, United Kingdom	–	400 m	DQ
2003	Central American and Caribbean Championships	St. George's, Grenada	1st	400 m	51.56
2003	Central American and Caribbean Championships	St. George's, Grenada	2nd	4x400 m	3:32.99
2003	Pan American Games	Santo Domingo, Dominican Rep.	2nd	400 m	51.56
2003	World Championships	Paris, France	20th (h)	400 m	51.95
2004	Olympic Games	Athens, Greece	15th (sf)	400 m	51.47
2005	Central American and Caribbean Championships	Nassau, Bahamas	7th	400 m	52.79
2005	World Championships	Helsinki, Finland	28th (h)	400 m	52.51
2006	Commonwealth Games	Melbourne, Australia	6th	400 m	52.35
2006	Central American and Caribbean Games	Cartagena, Colombia	2nd	400 m	51.16
2007	Pan American Games	Rio de Janeiro, Brazil	21st (h)	400 m	54.75
2007	World Championships	Osaka, Japan	39th (h)	400 m	54.78
2008	Central American and Caribbean Championships	Cali, Colombia	17th (h)	400 m	54.72
2009	Central American and Caribbean Championships	Havana, Cuba	10th (h)	400 m	54.66
