= Indira Terrero =

Spanish sprinter (born 1985)

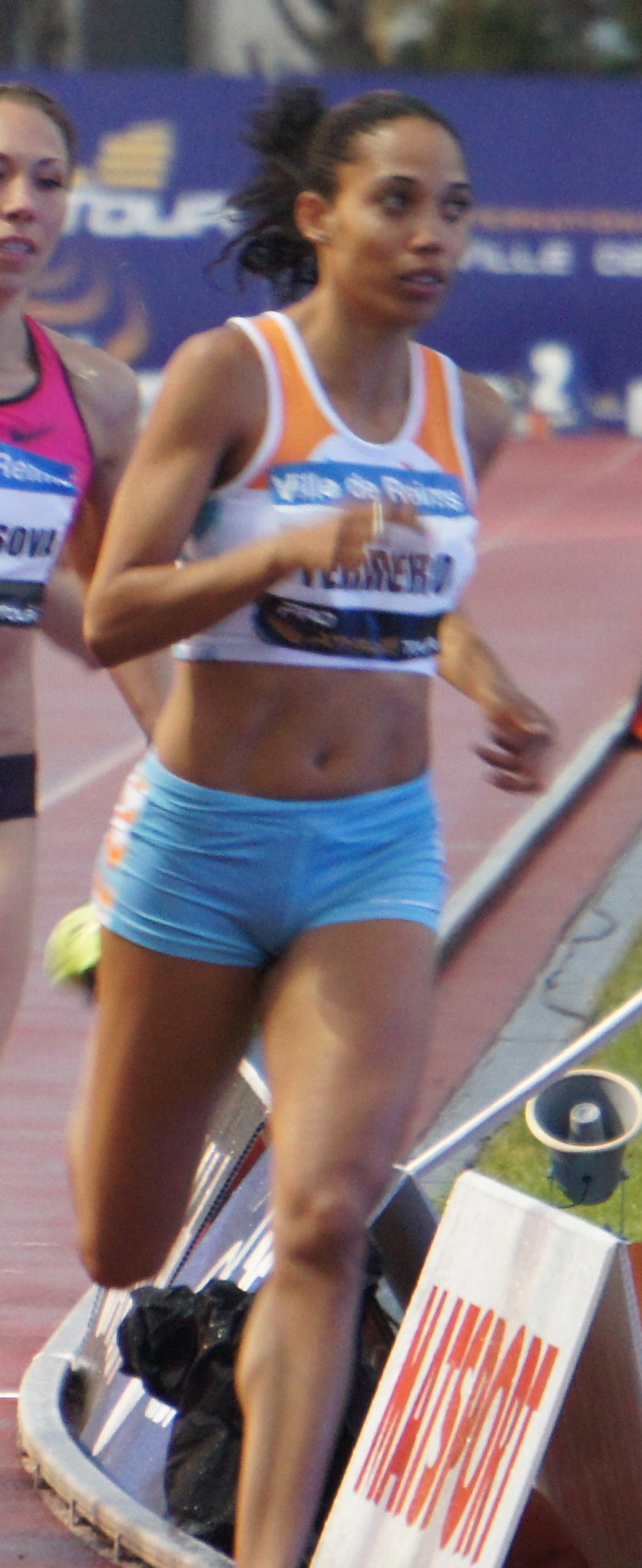
- Indira Terrero in 2013

Personal information
- Full name: Indira Terrero Letuce
- Born: November 29, 1985 (age 40) Havana, Cuba
- Height: 1.61 m (5 ft 3 in)
- Weight: 52 kg (115 lb)

Sport
- Country: Spain
- Sport: Athletics
Medal record
Women's athletics
Representing Cuba
Pan American Games
Gold medal – first place	2007 Rio de Janeiro	4x400m relay
Bronze medal – third place	2007 Rio de Janeiro	400m
Representing Spain
European Championships
Bronze medal – third place	2014 Zürich	400 m
European Indoor Championships
Silver medal – second place	2015 Prague	400 m

Indira Terrero Letuce (born 29 November 1985) is a Spanish sprinter who specializes in the 400 metres. Earlier she represented her native Cuba.

== Career ==
Her personal best time is 51.00 seconds, achieved in May 2007 in Havana.

== Personal best ==
Outdoor

- 100 m: 11.70 s (wind: -1.9 m/s) – (Spain) Cáceres, 29 June 2011
- 200 m: 23.80 s (wind: +0.0 m/s) – (Cuba) Camagüey, 14 March 2009
- 400 m: 50.98 s A – (Colombia) Cali, 4 July 2008
- 800 m: 2:03.24 min – (Spain) San Fernando, 6 June 2010

Indoor

- 200 m: 23.92 s – (Spain) Valencia, 26 January 2013
- 400 m: 52.02 s – (France) Metz, 24 February 2013

== Achievements ==
Year	Competition	Venue	Position	Event	Notes
Representing Cuba
2005	ALBA Games	La Habana, Cuba	2nd	400 m	53.5 s
2005	Central American and Caribbean Championships	Nassau, Bahamas	15th (h)	400 m	55.47 s
2005	Central American and Caribbean Championships	Nassau, Bahamas	3rd	4 × 400 m relay	3:33.85 min
2007	ALBA Games	Caracas, Venezuela	1st	400 m	51.99 s
2007	ALBA Games	Caracas, Venezuela	1st	4 × 400 m relay	3:38.77 min
2007	Pan American Games	Rio de Janeiro, Brazil	3rd	400 m	51.09 s
2007	Pan American Games	Rio de Janeiro, Brazil	1st	4 × 400 m relay	3:27.51 min
2007	World Championships	Osaka, Japan	15th (sf)	400 m	51.08 s
2007	World Championships	Osaka, Japan	7th	4 × 400 m relay	3:27.05 min
2008	Central American and Caribbean Championships	Cali, Colombia	1st	400 m	50.98 s
2008	Central American and Caribbean Championships	Cali, Colombia	1st	4 × 400 m relay	3:27.97 min
2008	Olympic Games	Beijing, China	16th (sf)	400 m	51.80 s
2008	Olympic Games	Beijing, China	6th	4 × 400 m relay	3:23.21 min
2009	ALBA Games	Havana, Cuba	1st	400 m	51.79 s
2009	Central American and Caribbean Championships	Havana, Cuba	1st	400 m	51.64 s
2009	Central American and Caribbean Championships	Havana, Cuba	1st	4 × 400 m relay	3:29.94
2009	World Championships	Berlin, Germany	16th (sf)	400 m	51.87 s
2009	World Championships	Berlin, Germany	8th	4 × 400 m relay	3:36.99 min
2010	Ibero-American Championships	San Fernando, Spain	3rd	800 m	2:03.24 min
2010	Ibero-American Championships	San Fernando, Spain	1st	4 × 400 m relay	3:30.73 min
Representing Spain
2014	European Championships	Zürich, Switzerland	3rd	400 m	51.38 s
2015	European Indoor Championships	Prague, Czech Republic	2nd	400 m	52.63 s
2016	Ibero-American Championships	Rio de Janeiro, Brazil	2nd	4 × 400 m relay	3:36.16 min
2016	European Championships	Amsterdam, Netherlands	–	400 m	DNF
