= Demetria Washington =

American sprinter (born 1979)

Demetria Washington (born December 31, 1979) is an athlete who attended the University of South Carolina, graduating in 2003. She was a member of the US team that won at 2003 World Championships in Athletics – Women's 4 × 400 metres relay. She is known as a "sprinter" and was trained by Curtis Frye.
