= Virginie Michanol =

French sprinter

Virginie Michanol (born 18 June 1985) is a French sprinter who specializes in the 400 metres.

She was born in Albi. As a junior, she won the bronze medal in the 200 metres at the 2003 European Junior Championships with a career-best time of 23.36 seconds. She also competed at the 2002 World Junior Championships and the 2010 World Indoor Championships without reaching the final.

In the 4 x 400 metres relay event she finished seventh at the 2009 World Championships, and also competed at the 2003 World Championships and the 2008 Olympic Games.

23.36 seconds is still her personal best 200 metres time. Her personal best 400 metres time is 51.83 seconds, achieved in July 2008 in Reims.
