= Antonina Yefremova =

Ukrainian sprinter (born 1981)

Medal record

Women's athletics

Representing Ukraine

European Team Championships
| Gold medal – first place | 2011 Stockholm | 400 m |
| Silver medal – second place | 2010 Bergen | 400 m |
| Bronze medal – third place | 2010 Bergen | 4x400 m relay |
| Bronze medal – third place | 2011 Stockholm | 4x400 m relay |

European Indoor Cup
| Bronze medal – third place | 2004 Leipzig | 400 m |

Summer Universiade
| Gold medal – first place | 2007 Bangkok | 4×400 m relay |
| Bronze medal – third place | 2005 İzmir | 4×400 m relay |

European U23 Championships
| Gold medal – first place | 2001 Amsterdam | 400 m |
| Bronze medal – third place | 2001 Amsterdam | 4x400 m relay |

Antonina Yefremova (born 19 July 1981) is a Ukrainian sprinter who specializes in the 400 metres. Yefremova received a two-year ban in 2012 for using testosterone at the 2011 World Athletics Championships.

She won the gold medal at the 2001 European U23 Championships, finished sixth at the 2002 European Championships and fourth at the 2008 World Indoor Championships. She reached the semi-final at the 2000 World Junior Championships, the 2003 World Championships and the 2004 Olympic Games, and competed at the 2003 World Indoor Championships, the 2005 World Championships, the 2008 Olympic Games and the 2010 World Indoor Championships without progressing from the first round.

In the 4 x 400 metres relay she finished fifth at the 2002 World Cup, fifth at the 2003 World Indoor Championships, fourth at the 2005 European Indoor Championships, fifth at the 2005 World Championships, won a bronze medal at the 2005 Summer Universiade, and won a gold medal at the 2007 Summer Universiade. She also competed at the 2003 World Championships, the 2004 Olympic Games, the 2007 World Championships, and the 2009 World Championships.

Her personal best times are 50.70 seconds in the 400 metres, achieved in June 2002 in Annecy, and 24.35 in the 200 metres (indoor), achieved in February 2005 in Sumy.

In 2011, she competed for Fenerbahçe Athletics in Turkey. She failed a random drug test in June 2012 and was banned for two years.
