= Davita Prendergast =

Jamaican sprinter (born 1984)

Personal information
- Born: 6 December 1984 (age 41) Westmoreland, Jamaica

Sport
- Sport: Track and field
Medal record
Athletics
Representing Jamaica
World Championships
Silver medal – second place	2007 Osaka	4x400 m relay
CAC Junior Championships (U20)
Gold medal – first place	2002 Bridgetown	4x400 m relay
Silver medal – second place	2002 Bridgetown	400 m
CARIFTA Games Junior (U20)
Gold medal – first place	2003 Port of Spain	4x400 m relay
Bronze medal – third place	2003 Port of Spain	400 m

Davita Prendergast (born 6 December 1984) is a Jamaican sprinter, who specializes in the 400 meters.

== Career ==
She ran the 4 x 400 meters relay with Jamaica at the 2007 World Championships in Athletics and the team took the silver medal and recorded a Central American and Caribbean record in the process. Prendergast came in with the Jamaican relay team at the 2010 World Indoor Championships in third place, but was stripped of the bronze medal because of the disqualification of Bobby-Gaye Wilkins.

== Achievements ==
Year	Competition	Venue	Position	Event	Notes
2002	Central American and Caribbean Junior Championships (U-20)	Bridgetown, Barbados	2nd	400 m	54.10
2002	Central American and Caribbean Junior Championships (U-20)	Bridgetown, Barbados	1st	4 × 400 m relay	3:34.76
2002	World Junior Championships	Kingston, Jamaica	5th (sf)	400 m	53.76
2002	World Junior Championships	Kingston, Jamaica	4th	4 × 400 m relay	3:31.90 SB
2003	CARIFTA Games	Port of Spain, Trinidad and Tobago	1st	4 × 400 m relay	3:36.20 CR
2003	CARIFTA Games	Port of Spain, Trinidad and Tobago	3rd	400 m	53.96
2007	Pan American Games	Rio, Brazil	5th	400 m	51.90
2007	Pan American Games	Rio, Brazil	4th	4 × 400 m relay	3:28.74
2007	World Championships	Osaka, Japan	2nd	4 × 400 m relay	3:19.73 NR

=== Personal bests ===
- 200 meters – 23.34 seconds (2007)
- 400 meters – 51.24 seconds (2007)
