= DeeDee Trotter =

American athlete

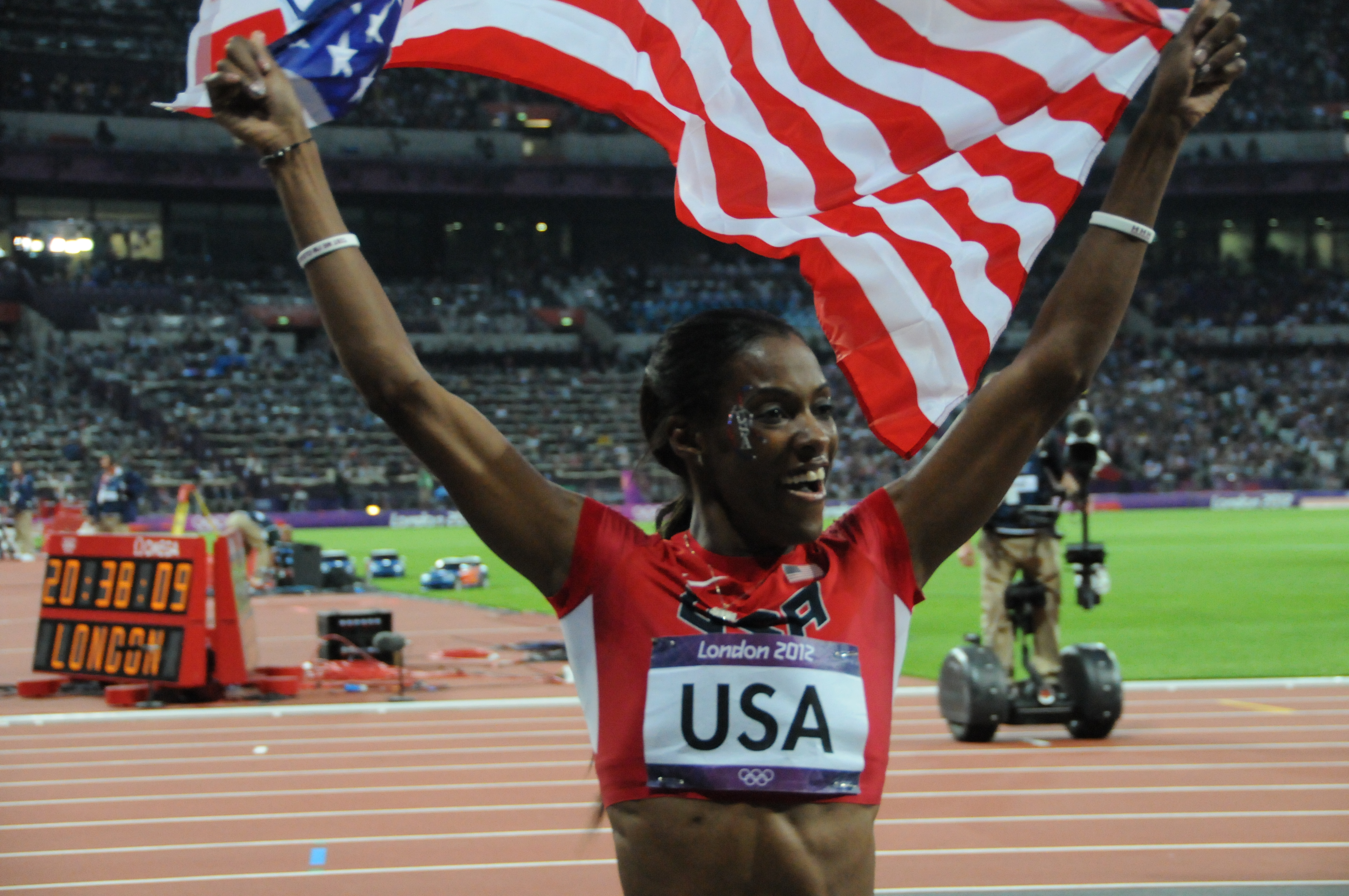
- Trotter at the 2012 Olympics

Personal information
- Full name: De'Hashia Tonnek Trotter
- Born: December 8, 1982 (age 43) Twentynine Palms, California, U.S.
- Height: 5 ft 10 in (1.78 m)
- Weight: 141 lb (64 kg)

Sport
- Country: United States
- Sport: Athletics
- Event: 4 × 400 m Relay
Medal record
Women's athletics
Representing the United States
Olympic Games
Gold medal – first place	2004 Athens	4 × 400 m relay
Gold medal – first place	2012 London	4 × 400 m relay
Bronze medal – third place	2012 London	400 m
World Championships
Gold medal – first place	2003 Paris	4 × 400 m relay
Gold medal – first place	2007 Osaka	4 × 400 m relay
World Indoor Championships
Gold medal – first place	2010 Doha	4 × 400 m relay
World Relay Championships
Gold medal – first place	2014 Nassau	4 × 400 m relay

De'Hashia Tonnek "DeeDee" Trotter (born December 8, 1982) is an American athlete. Trotter is a University of Tennessee Hall of Fame inductee, and former NCAA national champion in the 400 m. She competed in the 2004, 2008, and 2012 Summer Olympics. There, she claimed two-time Olympic gold medals in the 4 × 400 m relay (2004 and 2012), in addition to a bronze medal in the 2012 400 m event. Trotter is currently an international motivational speaker and the Executive Pastry Chef of Taste of Gold Bakery in Atlanta, Georgia.

== Early life ==
Trotter was born in Twenty Nine Palms, California, on December 8, 1982. She grew up in Decatur, Georgia, graduating from Cedar Grove High School in 2001. She was a member of both the track and basketball teams, helping to lead the basketball team in her senior year to an undefeated season on home court. She specialized in both the 200 m and 400 m in track, and in her senior year, she also helped lead the 4 × 400 m relay team from her highschool to the Georgia State Championship.

== College track and field ==
Trotter was mainly a basketball player in high school, and took up track-and-field as a second sport under the encouragement of those who saw her running on the court. She earned a track-and-field scholarship to the University of Tennessee, and was forced to turn away from basketball and focus solely on running. In 2003, she placed second in the NCAA championships in the distance, and in 2004 she was the NCAA champion. She still holds the Tennessee record time of 50.0s. She graduated from the university with a major in sociology. She later trained under coach Caryl Smith-Gilbert, who continued to train Trotter after her graduation. Trotter became the first woman to turn professional as a track-and-field athlete coming out of the University of Tennessee before graduation, turning pro in her junior year.

== Professional track and field career ==
=== 2003-04 ===
Trotter competed at the 2003 IAAF World Athletics Championship in France, running in the 400 m, where she qualified for the semi-finals. That year she also won gold in the 4 × 400 m women's relay, at both the World Championships and the Pan-American Games. Trotter qualified for the 2004 Summer Olympics team in the 400 m, and was considered a medal contender going into the games. Trotter placed 5th overall in the 400 metres with a personal best time of 50.00s. She was part of the US team which finished first in the 4 × 400 meters relay, which beat the second placed team from Russia by more than one second. Trotter ran first, with a lead leg time of 49.19 seconds.

=== 2005-11 ===
In 2005 and 2006, Trotter repeated as gold medalist at the USA Indoor Championships. In 2007, she won an additional 4 × 400 m gold at that year's World Championships. In 2007, she finished first in the 400 m at the US Track and Field Championships, with the fastest time in the world that year: 49.64 seconds, and afterwards stated that her victory "was like a dream". According to USA Track and Field, "At the 2008 Olympic Trials, in perhaps the most astounding story of the women's 400, Trotter finished third in 50.88. She was running with a broken bone chip in her left leg, the result of an errant car door closing on her two months ago." Trotter did compete in the women's 400 meters race at the 2008 Summer Olympics, and qualified out of heats for the semi-finals, but failed to qualify for the finals due to the injury. She also withdrew from her spot on the 4 × 400 m relay.

After the Olympics Trotter had successful reconstructive surgery and was able to return to competition in 2009. In her return races, she used face paint to help motivate her return to form. However the following three years she remained plagued with injuries. Still, in 2010 during the Reebok Boston Indoor Games Trotter tripped near the beginning of the race, but was able to recover her stride and eventually place first in the 400 m event despite the misstep. She stated after the race that nothing like that had ever happened to her, but her first instinct was 'as long as I'm not on the ground, just keep running'. Trotter is also a multi-time IAAF Diamond League silver and bronze medalist.

=== 2012 to present ===
Leading into the 2012 Olympics, she again recorded the fastest time that year in the 400 m. She said of the time that, "My personality, demeanor, confidence and spirit were low. That DeeDee is gone. I overcame my entire career crumbling and made the Olympic Team." She qualified at the national championships with a second place showing. At the 2012 Olympics in London she won the bronze medal in the 400 meters in a time of 49.72, two one hundredths of a second behind the silver medalist. She was also the lead runner in the gold medal 4 × 400 m US relay team, providing her team with a 10 m lead at the end of her leg. After winning the event, Trotter stated that, "I think the pressure was on to go out and do what we are capable of doing ... I think we finally hit the mark this time. We hit the center of the target. We got it done." Trotter ran her final lap at the 2016 USA Olympic Trials to gracefully retire from the sport. After a thirteen-year career, Trotter waved farewell to the crowd at Hayward Field in Eugene, Oregon, after crossing the finish line of the 400 m semifinals and not advancing to the finals.

== Other work ==
In 2009 Trotter was the winner of the Bodybuilding.com Model Search, transitioning into a part-time career as a fitness model. In 2013 Trotter became a volunteer assistant coach in the sprints for the USC Trojans track and field team. That year she also began a fundraising drive called Gifted Soles, which gathers shoes for the homeless population of Orlando. The drive also raised funds for 500 meals for the homeless as well. Donations were made through the Orlando Union Rescue Mission. In 2014, Trotter dissolved her non-profit organization Test Me I'm Clean and launched a new non-profit entitled Running For The People. Running For The People used running as a way to help people in need of encouragement. In 2020, Trotter traveled to Japan as a Sports Envoy for the U.S. State Department's Sports Diplomacy Office.

== Anti-doping advocacy ==
Trotter is the founder of Test Me I'm Clean, a charity dedicated to combating the abuse of steroids and other performance-enhancing drugs. She also acts as the organization's spokesperson, traveling across the United States giving speeches and presentations to students about the importance of staying clean. Those that support the organization can identify themselves with a white and red rubber armband, which Trotter herself wore during her 2012 bronze medal race. Trotter was inspired to found the charity in 2006, after overhearing a conversation on an airplane where the participants were convinced that all elite athletes were on steroids, which she took exception to. She has said of the program that, "I'm more concerned with the health aspect than anything else ... [Drugs] have been glorified. It's not something that is always emphasized as a danger, so I wanted to make that very clear."

Trotter was one of the founding athletes of Project Believe, in which twelve athletes volunteered for frequent random out-of-competition drug testing. As a part of the testing she volunteer to give 31 additional testing samples. She was quoted as saying of the program that, "[T]o prevent myself from going down in the flames ... We have to do something ... Otherwise, it will continue to go down this path, and it won't stop." In 2009, Trotter also became one of the first twelve athletes to join the "Athlete Ambassador" program, which is a U.S. Anti-Doping Agency (USADA) initiative. As an ambassador, Trotter travelled to speak with students about the importance of staying clean in sports. She also wrote articles for the USADA website. After this initial advocacy, Athens 4 × 400 m relay team member Crystal Cox, pleaded guilty to a doping violation in 2010, and was stripped of her gold medal. In 2013 however, the other three members (including Trotter) were allowed to keep their own gold medals and the team remains the gold medal team in the historical Olympics standings.
