= Lyudmila Litvinova =

Russian sprinter

Medal record

Representing Russia

Women's athletics

Olympic Games
Disqualified	2008 Beijing	4x400 relay

World Championships
Bronze medal – third place	2009 Berlin	4x400 m relay
Bronze medal – third place	2011 Daegu	4x400 m relay

Lyudmila Litvinova (born June 8, 1985) is a Russian sprint athlete.

Litvinova won the silver medal in the 4 × 400 m Women's relay for Russia at the 2008 Beijing Summer Olympics.
