= 2002 IAAF Grand Prix Final =

Athletics competition in Paris, France

- Host city: Paris, France
- Events: 19
- Dates: 14 September
- Main venue: Stade Sébastien Charléty

The 2002 IAAF Grand Prix Final was the eighteenth edition of the season-ending competition for the IAAF Grand Prix track and field circuit, organised by the International Association of Athletics Federations. It was held on 14 September at the Stade Sébastien Charléty in Paris, France. Paris became the third city to host the event for a second time, following Rome and Fontvieille.

Hicham El Guerrouj (1500 metres) and Marion Jones (100 metres) were the overall points winners of the tournament. Both athletes took their second career win in the series, El Guerrouj becoming the third man to achieve the feat and Jones the second woman. A total of 18 athletics events were contested, ten for men and eight for women.

This was the last IAAF Grand Prix Final to be staged, the competition being replaced by the IAAF World Athletics Final in 2003.

== Medal summary ==
=== Men ===
Event	Gold		Silver		Bronze	
Overall	Hicham El Guerrouj (MAR)	116	Félix Sánchez (DOM)	116	Christian Olsson (SWE)	102
100 metres	Jon Drummond (USA)	9.97	Kim Collins (SKN)	9.98	Francis Obikwelu (POR)	10.03
400 metres	Michael Blackwood (JAM)	44.72	Greg Haughton (JAM)	44.87	Leonard Byrd (USA)	44.92
1500 metres	Hicham El Guerrouj (MAR)	3:29.27	Bernard Lagat (KEN)	3:30.54	Cornelius Chirchir (KEN)	3:31.51
3000 metres	Abraham Chebii (KEN)	8:33.42	Paul Bitok (KEN)	8:34.00	Mark Bett (KEN)	8:34.20
400 m hurdles	Félix Sánchez (DOM)	47.62	Stéphane Diagana (FRA)	47.82	James Carter (USA)	48.12
High jump	Stefan Holm (SWE)	2.31 m	Yaroslav Rybakov (RUS)	2.28 m	Abderrahmane Hammad (ALG)	2.28 m
Pole vault	Jeff Hartwig (USA)	5.75 m	Aleksandr Averbukh (ISR)	5.75 m	Tim Lobinger (GER)	5.65 m
Triple jump	Christian Olsson (SWE)	17.48 m	Jonathan Edwards (GBR)	17.41 m	Alexander Martínez (CUB)	17.09 m
Shot put	Adam Nelson (USA)	21.34 m	Yuriy Bilonog (UKR)	20.74 m	Milan Haborák (SVK)	20.40 m
Hammer throw	Koji Murofushi (JPN)	81.14 m	Adrián Annus (HUN)	80.03 m	Balázs Kiss (HUN)	79.74 m

=== Women ===
Event	Gold		Silver		Bronze	
Overall	Marion Jones (USA)	116	Gail Devers (USA)	111	Ana Guevara (MEX)	108
100 metres	Marion Jones (USA)	10.88	Debbie Ferguson (BAH)	10.97	Tayna Lawrence (JAM)	10.99
400 metres	Ana Guevara (MEX)	49.90	Lorraine Fenton (JAM)	50.47	Jearl Miles Clark (USA)	51.48
1500 metres	Yelena Zadorozhnaya (RUS)	4:00.63	Suzy Favor Hamilton (USA)	4:01.08	Geraldine Hendricken (IRL)	4:02.08
3000 metres	Gabriela Szabo (ROM)	8:56.29	Tatyana Tomashova (RUS)	8:56.34	Berhane Adere (ETH)	8:56.60
100 m hurdles	Gail Devers (USA)	12.51	Brigitte Foster (JAM)	12.62	Anjanette Kirkland (USA)	12.62
Long jump	Maurren Maggi (BRA)	7.02 m	Tatyana Kotova (RUS)	6.86w m	Tünde Vaszi (HUN)	6.70 m
Discus throw	Natalya Sadova (RUS)	65.79 m	Vera Pospíšilová (CZE)	64.10 m	Ellina Zvereva (BLR)	63.28 m
Javelin throw	Osleidys Menéndez (CUB)	65.69 m	Mikaela Ingberg (FIN)	62.34 m	Tatyana Shikolenko (RUS)	62.25 m
