= Lorraine Fenton =

Jamaican sprinter (born 1973)

Personal information
- Born: Lorraine Graham; September 8, 1973 (age 52) Manchester, Jamaica

Sport
- Country: Jamaica
- Sport: Athletics
- Event: 400 m
- Retired: 2006

Achievements and titles
- Personal bests: 100 m: 11.73 (1999); 200 m: 22.63 (2001); 400 m: 49.30 (2002)
Medal record
Women's athletics
Representing Jamaica
Olympic Games
Silver medal – second place	2000 Sydney	400 m
Silver medal – second place	2000 Sydney	4 × 400 m relay
World Championships
Gold medal – first place	2001 Edmonton	4 × 400 m relay
Silver medal – second place	2001 Edmonton	400 m
Silver medal – second place	2003 Paris	400 m
Silver medal – second place	2005 Helsinki	4 × 400 m relay
Bronze medal – third place	1997 Athens	4 × 400 m relay
Bronze medal – third place	1999 Seville	400 m
Bronze medal – third place	2003 Paris	4 × 400 m relay

Lorraine Fenton (born Lorraine Graham on 8 September 1973 in Manchester) is a retired Jamaican athlete who specialized in the 400 metres.

== Career ==
Her career highlight came when she won the Olympic silver medal in 2000, being the first Jamaican woman to win a medal in this event. She also won silver medals at the 2001 and 2003 World Championships, a bronze medal at the 1999 World Championships, as well as gold, silver and bronze medals in the relay. In 2002, she set a Jamaican record in 400 m with 49.30 seconds that lasted until 2024.

She missed the 2004 Olympic season due to a hamstring injury, but she returned to win a silver medal with the 4 × 400 metres relay team at the 2005 World Championships in Athletics (together with Shericka Williams, Novlene Williams and Ronetta Smith). She retired after the 2006 season.

== Achievements ==
Year	Competition	Venue	Position	Notes
Representing Jamaica
1997	IAAF World Championships	Athens, Greece	3rd	4 × 400 m Relay
1998	IAAF Golden League / Grand Prix Final	Moscow, Russia	7th	400 m
1999	IAAF World Championships	Seville, Spain	3rd	400 m
2000	Olympic Games	Sydney, Australia	2nd	400 m
2000	Olympic Games	Sydney, Australia	2nd	4 × 400 m
2000	IAAF Grand Prix Final	Doha, Qatar	1st	400 m
2001	IAAF World Championships	Edmonton, Alberta	2nd	400 m
2001	IAAF World Championships	Edmonton, Alberta	1st	4 × 400 m
2002	IAAF Grand Prix Final	Paris, France	2nd	400 m
2003	IAAF World Championships	Paris, France	2nd	400 m
2003	IAAF World Championships	Paris, France	3rd	4 × 400 m
2003	IAAF World Athletics Final	Monte Carlo, Monaco	2nd	400 m
2005	IAAF World Championships	Helsinki, Finland	2nd	4 × 400 m

=== Personal bests ===
Date	Event	Venue	Time
1 June 1999	100 m	Tartu, Estonia	11.73
13 June 2001	200 m	Kassel, Germany	22.63
19 July 2002	400 m	Monaco	49.30
