= Monique Henderson =

American track and field athlete (born 1983)

Personal information
- Full name: Monique Marie Henderson
- Born: February 18, 1983 (age 43) San Diego, California, U.S.
Medal record
Women's athletics
Representing United States
Olympic Games
Gold medal – first place	2004 Athens	4 × 400 meter relay
Gold medal – first place	2008 Beijing	4 × 400 meter relay

Monique Marie Henderson (born February 18, 1983, in San Diego, California) is an American track and field athlete, who specializes in the 400-meter dash. Henderson was a gold medalist in both the 2004 Olympic Games in Athens, Greece and the 2008 Olympic Games in Beijing, China as a member of the American 4 × 400-meter relay squad.

As a young runner, she set the still standing American record for 9-10-year-old girls in the 400 meters.

Henderson prepped at Morse High School in San Diego '01. She is the only four-time 400 meters California State Champion in the state's history from 98–01. In 1999 while in high school, age 16, she won the 400 m at the World Youth Championship in Bydgoszcz, Poland. At age 17, she set a US junior class, as well as high school national record (since broken), at 50.74 in the 400 m at the CIF California State Meet. In 2000, still in high school, she was named to the US Olympic track and field team. Selected as an alternate (Pool) for the 4 × 400 m squad but did not run. That year she was named the national Girl's "High School Athlete of the Year" by Track and Field News.

After graduating from high school in 2001 she accepted a scholarship to attend UCLA. While at UCLA in 2002, she place 1st in the 400 m at the World Junior Championship held in Kingston Jamaica. Also at UCLA she went on to be a five-time Pac-10 champion. In 2004, she placed second at the NCAA championships at 400 m. The next year she became the 2005 NCAA outdoor champion at 400 m, establishing a new NCAA record (50.10). In 2005, she won the Honda Award as the nation's best female collegiate track and field athlete.

Since 2010, the gold medal at the Athens Olympics in 2004 has been in doubt as Crystal Cox, who ran for the team in a preliminary round, admitted to doping. However, as of 2012 the original result still stands.

She holds a master's degree in kinesiology and worked as a professor in the exercise science department at San Diego Mesa College until 2015 when she became the head coach at Golden West College in Summer 2015.

== Honors ==
Monique Henderson was nominated and inducted into the San Diego County Women's Hall of Fame in 2009 hosted by Women's Museum of California, Commission on the Status of Women, University of California, San Diego Women's Center, and San Diego State University Women's Studies.
