= Maria Laura Almirão =

Brazilian sprinter (born 1977)

Personal information
- Nationality: Brazil
- Born: 20 September 1977 (age 49) São Paulo, Brazil
- Height: 1.62 m (5 ft 4 in)
- Weight: 50 kg (110 lb)

Sport
- Sport: Athletics
- Event: Sprint
- Club: Associação Profissional BMF
- Coached by: Katsuhito Nakaya

Achievements and titles
- Personal best: 400 m: 51.30 s (2005)
Medal record
Women's athletics
Representing Brazil
Pan American Games
Bronze medal – third place	2003 Santo Domingo	4x400 m relay
Summer Universiade
Silver medal – second place	2001 Beijing	4x100 m relay
Ibero-American Championships
Gold medal – first place	2004 Huelva	400 m
Gold medal – first place	2004 Huelva	4×400 m relay
Silver medal – second place	2006 Ponce	400 m
Silver medal – second place	2008 Iquique	4×400 m relay
Bronze medal – third place	2008 Iquique	400 m

Maria Laura Almirão (born September 20, 1977 in São Paulo) is a Brazilian sprinter, who specialized in the 400 metres. She is a two-time Olympian and a five-time medalist for the 400 metres and sprint relay at the Ibero-American Championships.

Almirao qualified for the women's 400 metres at the 2004 Summer Olympics in Athens, by winning the gold medal from the Ibero-American Championships in Huelva, Spain. She finished fifth in the second heat of the event by six hundredths of a second (0.06) behind Jamaica's Nadia Davy, with a time of 52.10 seconds. Almirao eventually joined the national sprint team for the women's 4 × 400 m relay, along with her compatriots Josiane Tito, Lucimar Teodoro, and Geisa Coutinho. She and her team placed sixth on the second heat of the relay, for a seasonal best time of 3:28.43.

At the 2008 Summer Olympics in Beijing, Almirao competed again for the second time in individual and relay sprint events. For her first event, 400 metres, Almirao ran in the fourth heat against six other athletes, including Great Britain's Christine Ohuruogu, who eventually became an Olympic champion in the final. She finished the race again in fifth place by more than two seconds behind Ohuruogu, with a time of 53.26. Few days later, Almirao reunited with her teammates Lucimar Teodoro, Josiane Tito, and Emmily Pinheiro for the women's 4 × 400 m relay. She ran on the starting leg of the second heat, with an individual-split time of 53.49 seconds. Almirao and her team finished the relay in sixth place for a total time of 3:30.10, failing to advance into the final.

Almirao is also a full-time member of Associação Profissional BMF in São Caetano do Sul, being coached and trained by Japanese-born Katsuhito Nakaya.
