= 2009 British Indoor Athletics Championships =

- Dates: 14–15 February
- Host city: Sheffield
- Venue: EIS Sheffield
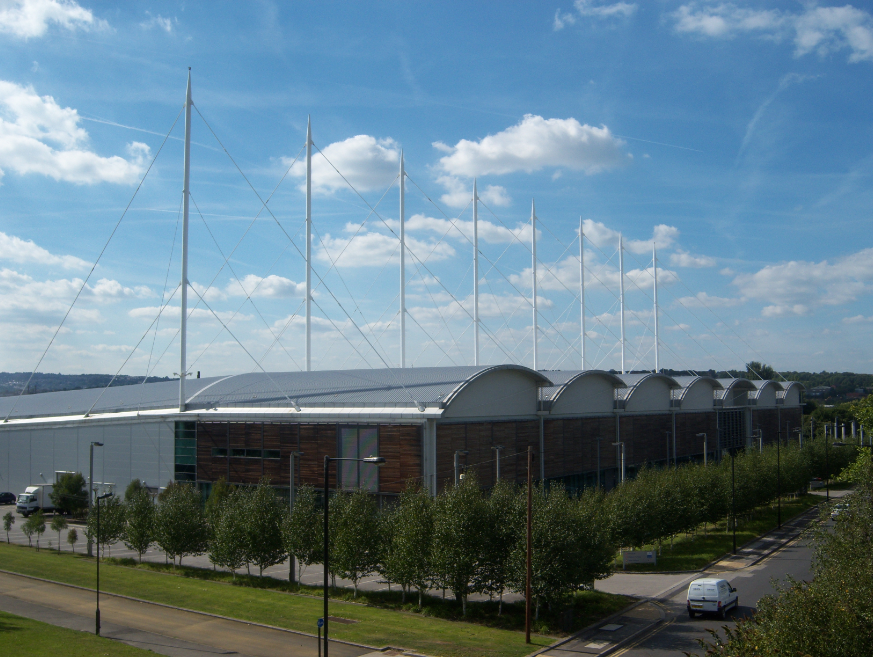
- Level: Senior national
- Type: Indoor
- Events: 24

The 2009 British Indoor Athletics Championships was the 3rd edition of the national championship in indoor track and field for the United Kingdom. It was held from 13–14 February at the English Institute of Sport, Sheffield, England. A total of 24 events (divided evenly between the sexes) were contested over the two-day competition.

== Medal summary ==
=== Men ===
Event	Gold		Silver		Bronze	
60 metres	Dwain Chambers	6.51	Tyrone Edgar	6.64	Simeon Williamson	6.66
200 metres	Leon Baptiste	21.04	Daniel Cossins	21.20	Rion Pierre-Forde	21.27
400 metres	Richard Buck	46.41	Mark Brown	47.32	John Kelley	47.63
800 metres	Ed Aston	1:48.82	Richard Hill	1:49.01	Joe Thomas	1:49.15
1500 metres	Mo Farah	3:40.57	Neil Speaight	3:42.67	Chris Warburton	3:43.04
3000 metres	Nick McCormick	7:54.73	Mark Draper	7:56.46	Neil Gamester	8:04.99
60 metres hurdles	Chris Baillie	7.74	Gianni Frankis	7.81	Callum Priestley	7.89
High jump	Darvin Edwards; Saint Lucia	2.22 m	Robbie Grabarz	2.19 m	Robert Mitchell	2.19 m
Pole vault	Steven Lewis	5.65 m	Luke Cutts	5.41 m	Paul Walker	5.31 m
Long jump	Chris Tomlinson	7.72 m	Leigh Smith	7.57 m	Richardo Childs	7.41 m
Triple jump	Julian Golley	16.07 m	Tosin Oke	16.01 m	Ben Williams	15.67 m
Shot put	Mark Edwards	18.90 m	Kieren Kelly	18.68 m	Rimantas Martisauskas; Lithuania	17.52 m

=== Women ===
Event	Gold		Silver		Bronze	
60 metres	Joice Maduaka	7.36	Elaine O'Neill	7.41	Ailis McSweeney; Ireland	7.43
200 metres	Donna Fraser	23.48	Helen Pryer	23.62	Emma Wiltshire	24.58
400 metres	Donna Fraser	52.83	Marilyn Okoro	52.98	Kim Wall	53.88
800 metres	Jenny Meadows	2:01.67	Vicky Griffiths	2:02.59	Tara Bird	2:06.27
1500 metres	Susan Scott	4:12.85	Hannah England	4:12.99	Charlotte Best	4:16.16
3000 metres	Deirdre Byrne; Ireland	9:04.78	Katrina Wootton	9:05.27	Gemma Turtle	9:05.41
60 metres hurdles	Gemma Bennett	8.06	Kelly Sotherton	8.30	Zara Hohn	8.49
High jump	Stephanie Pywell	1.82 m	Kay Humberstone	1.79 m	Vikki Hubbard	1.79 m
Pole vault	Kate Dennison	4.45 m	Emma Lyons	4.25 m	Zoe Brown; Ireland Louise Butterworth Sally Scott	4.05 m
Long jump	Kelly Proper; Ireland	6.44 m	Amy Woodman	6.40 m	Jade Johnson	6.36 m
Triple jump	Nony Mordi	13.23 m	Nadia Williams	13.18 m	Stephanie Aneto	13.07 m
Shot put	Alison Rodger	15.79 m	Kelly Sotherton	14.50 m	Rachel Wallader	14.34 m
