= 2008 British Athletics Championships =

- Dates: 11–13 July
- Host city: Birmingham, England
- Venue: Alexander Stadium
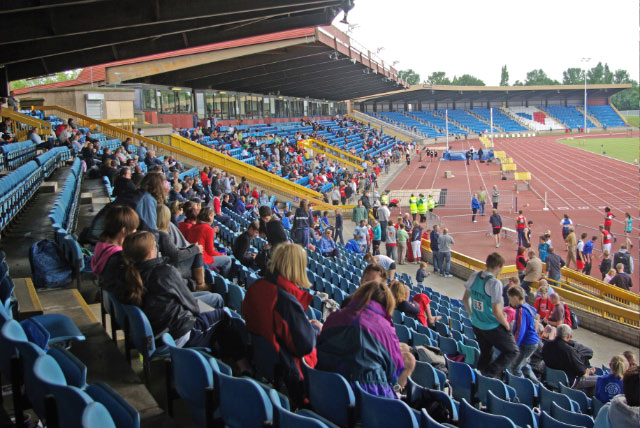
- Level: Senior
- Type: Outdoor

The 2008 British Athletics Championships was the national championship in outdoor track and field for athletes in the United Kingdom, held from 11–13 July at Alexander Stadium in Birmingham. It was organised by UK Athletics. It served as a selection meeting for Great Britain at the 2008 Summer Olympics.

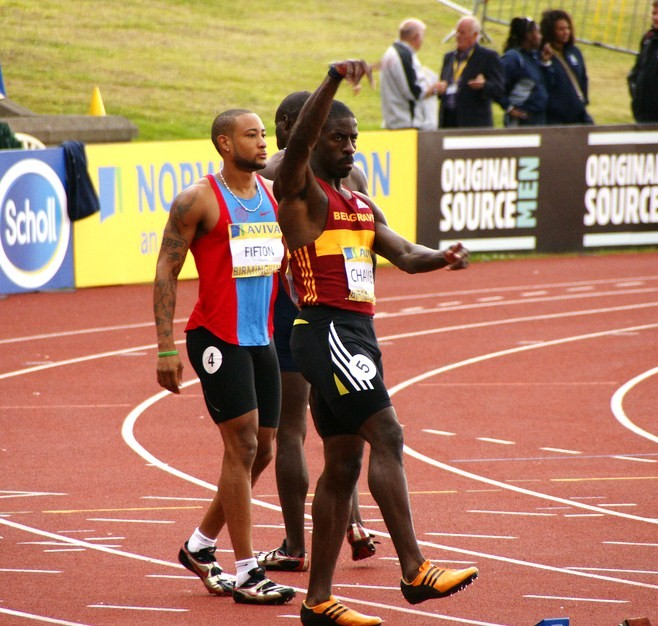
Dwain Chambers during the 100 metres event

== Results ==
=== Men ===
Event	Gold		Silver		Bronze	
100m (Wind: +1.6 m/s)	Dwain Chambers	10.00	Simeon Williamson	10.03	Craig Pickering	10.19
200m (Wind: +0.9 m/s)	(Wales) Christian Malcolm	20.52	Alexander Nelson	20.61	Leon Baptiste	20.80
400m	Martyn Rooney	45.31	Robert Tobin	46.18	Michael Bingham	46.28
800m	Michael Rimmer	1:49.13	Andy Baddeley	1:50.48	Richard Hill	1:50.63
1,500m	Tom Lancashire	3:38.92	Mo Farah	3:39.66	Chris Warburton	3:39.98
5,000m	Andy Vernon	13:54.26	Scott Overall	13:55.14	Mark Warmby	13:57.88
110m hurdles (Wind: +0.4 m/s)	Andy Turner	13.58	(Scotland) Allan Scott	13.67	William Sharman	13.84
400m hurdles	Richard Yates	49.50	Steven Green	50.26	(Wales) Dai Greene	51.08
3000m s'chase	Adam Bowden	8:36.17	Luke Gunn	8:36.52	Andrew Lemoncello	8:36.56
5000m walk	Daniel King	21:06.37	Mark Williams	22:21.40	Alex Wright	22:58.21
high jump	Tom Parsons	2.30 m	Germaine Mason	2.27 m	Martyn Bernard	2.23 m
pole vault	Steven Lewis	5.60 m	(Wales) Scott Simpson	5.30 m	Luke Cutts	5.20 m
long jump	Greg Rutherford	8.20 m (+2.0)	Chris Kirk	7.93 m (+1.7)	Nathan Morgan	7.88 m (+0.5)
triple jump	Phillips Idowu	17.58 m (+1.0)	Larry Achike	17.18 m (+1.0)	Nathan Douglas	17.18 m (+2.0)
shot put	Carl Myerscough	20.15 m	Mark Edwards	18.55 m	Scott Rider	18.11 m
discus throw	Emeka Udechuku	59.35 m	Abdul Buhari	58.18 m	Matthew Brown	54.64 m
hammer throw	Mike Floyd	69.68 m	Amir Williamson	68.24 m	Alex Smith	67.21 m
javelin throw	(Northern Ireland) Michael Allen	75.07 m	Mervyn Luckwell	72.13 m	Neil McLellan	70.38 m

=== Women ===
Event	Gold		Silver		Bronze	
100m (Wind: +1.8 m/s)	Jeanette Kwakye	11.26	Montell Douglas	11.35	Laura Turner-Alleyne	11.36
200m (Wind: +0.5 m/s)	Emily Freeman	22.92	Christine Ohuruogu	22.99	Joice Maduaka	23.53
400m	(Scotland) Lee McConnell	52.31	Vicki Barr	53.01	Donna Fraser	53.11
800m	Marilyn Okoro	1:59.81	Jemma Simpson	2:00.49	Vicky Griffiths	2:02.29
1,500m	Lisa Dobriskey	4:15.84	(Scotland) Susan Scott	4:16.66	Hannah England	4:17.82
5,000m	Jo Pavey	15:12.55	Hayley Higham	15:38.60	(Scotland) Laura Whittle	15:54.11
100m hurdles (Wind: +0.8 m/s)	Sarah Claxton	13.12	Sara McGreavy-Wills	13.35	Tasha Danvers	13.36
400m hurdles	Perri Shakes-Drayton	56.09	Tasha Danvers	57.00	(Scotland) Eilidh Doyle	57.83
3000m s'chase	Helen Clitheroe	9:36.98	Barbara Parker	9:40.10	Jo Ankier	9:48.14
5000m walk	Johanna Jackson	21:30.75	Niobe Menendez	25:18.67	(Scotland) Diane Bradley	26:19.45
high jump	Stephanie Pywell	1.88 m	Susan Moncrieff	1.85 m	Kelly Sotherton	1.78 m
pole vault	Emma Lyons	4.12 m	(Scotland) Kirsty Maguire	4.02 m	Louise Butterworth	3.92 m
long jump	Jade Johnson	6.30 m (+1.0)	Kelly Sotherton	6.28 m (+1.0)	Amy Woodman	6.09 m w (+4.2)
triple jump	Nadia Williams	13.35 m w (+2.9)	Yasmine Regis	13.13 m w (+3.1)	(Scotland) Gillian Kerr	13.03 m w (+2.8)
shot put	Joanne Duncan	15.99 m	Eden Francis	15.95 m	(Scotland) Alison Rodger	15.78 m
discus throw	Emma Carpenter	57.26 m	Philippa Roles	57.13 m	Eden Francis	52.48 m
hammer throw	Zoe Derham	67.27 m	Carys Parry	65.34 m	Laura Douglas	60.75 m
javelin throw	Goldie Sayers	62.62 m	Hayley Thomas	48.33 m	Rosie Semenytsh	47.01 m
