= 2009 British Athletics Championships =

- Dates: 10–12 July
- Host city: Birmingham, England
- Venue: Alexander Stadium
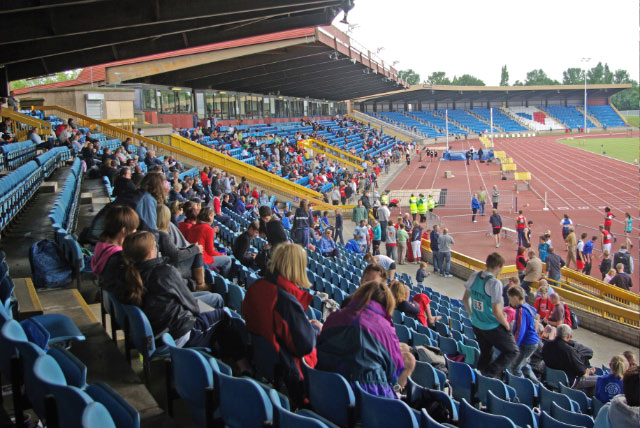
- Level: Senior
- Type: Outdoor

The 2009 British Athletics Championships was the national championship in outdoor track and field for athletes in the United Kingdom, held from 10–12 July at Alexander Stadium in Birmingham. It was organised by UK Athletics. It served as a selection meeting for Great Britain at the 2009 World Championships in Athletics.

In the men's discus throw, former Paralympic champion Daniel Greaves finished in fourth place with a mark of 54.14 m. The top performing British athlete in the women's 10,000 m race was Claire Hallissey, who finished fifth in a time of 33:10.73 minutes.

== Results ==
=== Men ===
Event	Gold		Silver		Bronze	
100m (Wind: -1.8 m/s)	Simeon Williamson	10.05	Dwain Chambers	10.22	Tyrone Edgar	10.28
200m (Wind: +0.9 m/s)	Toby Sandeman	20.69	Marlon Devonish	20.78	Leon Baptiste	20.79
400m	Robert Tobin	45.84	Conrad Williams	46.13	Set Osho	46.71
800m	Michael Rimmer	1:46.47	Damien Moss	1:48.15	Steven Fennell	1:48.34
1,500m	Jermaine Mays	3:41.26	Lee Emanuel	3:41.82	Nick McCormick	3:42.21
5,000m	Scott Overall	13:57.75	Ryan McLeod	13:58.52	Lee Merrien	13:59.35
10,000m	Andy Vernon	28:43.41	Phil Nicholls	29:22.17	Ian Hudspith	29:27.18
110m hurdles (Wind: -1.9 m/s)	Andy Turner	13.47	Callum Priestley	13.69	Gianni Frankis	13.86
400m hurdles	(Wales) Dai Greene	49.07	(Wales) Rhys Williams	50.20	Dale Garland	50.92
3000m s'chase	Luke Gunn	8:46.87	(Scotland) Bruce Raeside	8:51.05	Samatar Farah	8:57.09
5000m walk	(Scotland) Scott Davis	22:40.63	Alex Wright	23:20.13	Mark O'Kane	23:52.69
high jump	Germaine Mason	2.24 m	Samson Oni	2.24 m	Tom Parsons	2.24 m
pole vault	Luke Cutts	5.55 m	Steven Lewis	5.55 m	Paul Walker	5.20 m
long jump	Chris Tomlinson	8.03 m (+0.2)	Andre Fernandez	7.55 m w (+3.3)	Jonathan Moore	7.52 m (+1.3)
triple jump	Phillips Idowu	17.05 m (+1.6)	Nathan Douglas	17.01 m (+1.9)	Larry Achike	16.45 m (+0.0)
shot put	Carl Myerscough	19.87 m	Kieren Kelly	18.83 m	Emeka Udechuku	17.71 m
discus throw	Emeka Udechuku	56.93 m	(Wales) Brett Morse	55.86 m	Abdul Buhari	55.39 m
hammer throw	Alex Smith	69.79 m	Simon Bown	68.38 m	Mike Floyd	68.03 m
javelin throw	Mervyn Luckwell	77.70 m	Chris Hughff	70.47 m	Lee Doran	69.33 m

=== Women ===
Event	Gold		Silver		Bronze	
100m (Wind: -1.0 m/s)	Joice Maduaka	11.52	Kadi-Ann Thomas	11.59	Montell Douglas	11.64
200m (Wind: +0.5 m/s)	Emily Freeman	22.92	Joey Duck	23.62	Kadi-Ann Thomas	23.63
400m	Christine Ohuruogu	51.26	Perri Shakes-Drayton	51.81	Kim Wall	52.75
800m	Jemma Simpson	2:01.16	Jenny Meadows	2:01.62	Marilyn Okoro	2:02.94
1,500m	Charlene Thomas	4:09.18	(Scotland) Stephanie Twell	4:09.55	Hannah England	4:09.93
5,000m	(Scotland) Freya Ross	15:45.07	Charlotte Purdue	15:57.18	Juliet Potter	16:11.35
10,000	(Ethiopia) Meseret Defar	29:59.20	(Ethiopia) Aheza Kiros	31:21.22	(Kenya) Lineth Chepkurui	31:31.92
100m hurdles (Wind: +1.7 m/s)	Jessica Ennis-Hill	12.87	Sarah Claxton	13.16	Zara Hohn	13.41
400m hurdles	Nusrat Ceesay	57.13	Hannah Douglas	57.50	Sian Scott	57.71
3000m s'chase	Helen Clitheroe	9:48.24	(Scotland) Lennie Waite	9:52.62	Tina Brown	9:57.64
5000m walk	Johanna Jackson	21:21.67	Emma Doherty	25:15.23	(Scotland) Diane Bradley	26:30.85
high jump	Jessica Ennis-Hill	1.91 m	Vikki Hubbard	1.82 m	Kelly Sotherton	1.82 m
pole vault	Kate Dennison	4.57 m	(Scotland) Henrietta Paxton	4.15 m	Bryony Raine	4.05 m
long jump	Phyllis Agbo	6.42 m w (+3.0)	Amy Woodman	6.36 m (+0.8)	Abigail Irozuru	6.28 m w (+3.2)
triple jump	Nadia Williams	13.67 m (+2.0)	Yasmine Regis	13.43 m w (+2.4)	Claire Linskill	12.91 m (+1.1)
shot put	Eden Francis	16.33 m	Eleanor Gatrell	15.56 m	Joanne Duncan	15.23 m
discus throw	(Wales) Philippa Roles	57.57 m	Eden Francis	56.06 m	Jade Lally	53.75 m
hammer throw	Zoe Derham	67.94 m	Carys Parry	62.73 m	Sarah Holt	59.90 m
javelin throw	Goldie Sayers	55.33 m	Laura Whittingham	50.72 m	Katy Temple	50.62 m
