= Athletics at the 2005 Summer Universiade – Women's 4 × 400 metres relay =

The women's 4 × 400 metres relay event at the 2005 Summer Universiade was held on 19–20 August in İzmir, Turkey.

== Medalists ==
Gold	Silver	Bronze
Russia; Anastasiya Ovchinnikova; Yelena Migunova; Yekaterina Kostetskaya; Natalya Nazarova	Poland; Monika Bejnar; Ewelina Sętowska-Dryk; Marta Chrust-Rożej; Grażyna Prokopek	Ukraine; Antonina Yefremova; Olha Zavhorodnya; Nataliya Pyhyda; Liliya Lobanova; Anastasiya Rabchenyuk*

* Athletes who appeared in heats only.

== Results ==
=== Heats ===
Rank	Heat	Nation	Athletes	Time	Notes
1	2	Russia	Anastasiya Ovchinnikova, Yelena Migunova, Yekaterina Kostetskaya, Natalya Nazarova	3:32.09	Q
2	2	Great Britain	Kim Wall, Lisa Miller, Sian Scott, Nicola Sanders	3:33.34	Q
3	2	Belarus	Inna Kalinina, Katsiaryna Bobryk, Iryna Khliustava, Sviatlana Usovich	3:33.44	q
4	1	Ukraine	Antonina Yefremova, Anastasiya Rabchenyuk, Olha Zavhorodnya, Liliya Lobanova	3:33.86	Q
5	1	Kazakhstan	Anna Gavriushenko, Tatyana Azarova, Olga Tereshkova, Tatyana Khadjimuratova	3:34.62	Q
6	2	Poland	Monika Bejnar, Ewelina Sętowska-Dryk, Marta Chrust-Rożej, Grażyna Prokopek	3:37.64	q
7	1	Lithuania	Audra Dagelytė, Jekaterina Šakovič, Edita Kavaliauskienė, Jūratė Stanislovaitienė	3:37.72	q
8	2	Ireland	Michelle Carey, Elaine McCaffrey, Fiona O'Friel, Claire Bergin	3:38.73	q
9	2	Turkey	Birsen Engin, Burcu Şentürk, Pınar Saka, Özge Akın	3:40.41	
10	1	Bulgaria	Vaia Vladeva, Vania Stambolova, Teodora Kolarova, Violeta Kiskinova	3:40.59	
11	2	Thailand	Sunantha Kinnareewong, Saowalee Kaewchuy, Yuangjan Panthakarn, Wassanee Winatho	3:41.08	
12	1	Canada	Julia Kawamoto, Rebecca Johnstone, Adrienne Power, Martine Cloutier-LeBlanc	3:42.17	
13	1	Macau	Lai Choi Lok, Hoi Wai Kuan, Chan Wai Lan, Choi Sut Ieng	4:09.87	

=== Final ===
Rank	Nation	Athletes	Time	Notes
1st place, gold medalist(s)	Russia	Anastasiya Ovchinnikova, Yelena Migunova, Yekaterina Kostetskaya, Natalya Nazarova	3:27.47	
2nd place, silver medalist(s)	Poland	Monika Bejnar, Ewelina Sętowska-Dryk, Marta Chrust-Rożej, Grażyna Prokopek	3:27.71	
3rd place, bronze medalist(s)	Ukraine	Antonina Yefremova, Olha Zavhorodnya, Nataliya Pyhyda, Liliya Lobanova	3:28.23	
4	Great Britain	Kim Wall, Marilyn Okoro, Lisa Miller, Nicola Sanders	3:30.10	
5	Belarus	Katsiaryna Bobryk, Sviatlana Kouhan, Iryna Khliustava, Ilona Usovich	3:32.04	
6	Kazakhstan	Anna Gavriushenko, Tatyana Azarova, Olga Tereshkova, Tatyana Khadjimuratova	3:32.83	
7	Ireland	Michelle Carey, Joanne Cuddihy, Emily Maher, Elaine McCaffrey	3:36.10	
8	Lithuania	Audra Dagelytė, Jekaterina Šakovič, Edita Kavaliauskienė, Jūratė Stanislovaitienė	3:36.30	
