= 2010 British Indoor Athletics Championships =

- Dates: 13–14 February
- Host city: Sheffield
- Venue: EIS Sheffield
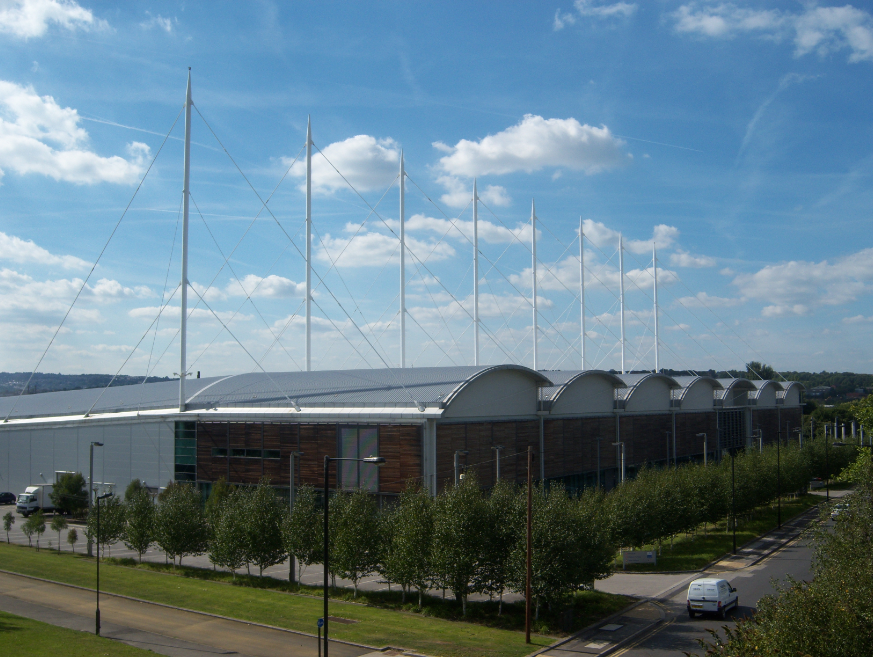
- Level: Senior national
- Type: Indoor
- Events: 24

The 2010 British Indoor Athletics Championships was the 4th edition of the national championship in indoor track and field for the United Kingdom. It was held from 13–14 February at the English Institute of Sport, Sheffield, England. A total of 24 events (divided evenly between the sexes) were contested over the two-day competition.

== Medal summary ==
=== Men ===
Event	Gold		Silver		Bronze	
60 metres	Dwain Chambers	6.50	Harry Aikines-Aryeetey	6.55	Craig Pickering	6.66
200 metres	Leon Baptiste	20.90	Conrad Williams	21.48	Chris Craig	21.98
400 metres	Richard Buck	47.54	Nigel Levine	47.73	Luke Lennon-Ford	48.16
800 metres	Andrew Osagie	1:50.21	Paul Bradshaw	1:50.55	Ed Aston	1:50.58
1500 metres	Colin McCourt	4:04.83	Tim Bayley	4:04.96	Scott Overall	4:05.99
3000 metres	Andy Vernon	8:00.70	Tom Lancashire	8:04.07	Jonathan Mellor	8:06.40
60 metres hurdles	Gianni Frankis	7.76	Lawrence Clarke	7.78	Nick Gayle	7.83
High jump	Samson Oni	2.25 m	Tom Parsons	2.25 m	Adam Scarr Robbie Grabarz	2.22 m
Pole vault	Steven Lewis	5.56 m	Andrew Sutcliffe	5.36 m	Luke Cutts	5.36 m
Long jump	Greg Rutherford	7.94 m	Chris Tomlinson	7.75 m	Matthew Burton	7.56 m
Triple jump	Tosin Oke	16.76 m	Nick Thomas	16.22 m	Ben Williams	15.94 m
Shot put	Mark Edwards	17.40 m	Ryan Spencer-Jones	17.02 m	Jamie Williamson	16.85 m

=== Women ===
Event	Gold		Silver		Bronze	
60 metres	Joice Maduaka	7.29	Bernice Wilson	7.34	Katherine Endacott	7.39
200 metres	Joice Maduaka	23.48	Katherine Endacott	23.57	Niamh Whelan; Ireland	23.86
400 metres	Kim Wall	53.07	Hayley Mills	53.85	Dawn Hunt	54.66
800 metres	Jenny Meadows	2:00.91	Vicky Griffiths	2:02.94	Danielle Christmas	2:05.15
1500 metres	Helen Clitheroe	4:13.90	Rose-Anne Galligan; Ireland	4:15.13	Kelly Neely	4:17.06
3000 metres	Hazel Murphy	9:02.06	Gemma Turtle	9:02.81	Emily Pidgeon	9:04.11
60 metres hurdles	Derval O'Rourke; Ireland	8.11	Gemma Bennett	8.20	Louise Hazel	8.27
High jump	Vikki Hubbard	1.87 m	Kay Humberstone	1.84 m	Deirdre Ryan; Ireland	1.81 m
Pole vault	Kate Dennison	4.40 m	Henrietta Paxton	4.21 m	Sally Scott	4.10 m
Long jump	Kelly Proper; Ireland	6.48 m	Amy Woodman	6.20 m	Louise Hazel	6.14 m
Triple jump	Trecia-Kaye Smith; Jamaica	13.69 m	Nadia Williams	13.41 m	Stephanie Aneto	12.78 m
Shot put	Alison Rodger	16.02 m	Rebecca Peake	15.43 m	Rachel Wallader	14.82 m
