= 2006 European Athletics Indoor Cup – results =

These are the full results of the 2006 European Athletics Indoor Cup which was held on 5 March 2006 at the Stade Couvert Régional in Liévin, France.

== Men's results ==
=== 60 metres ===
Rank	Name	Nationality	Time	Notes	Points
1	Ronald Pognon	France	6.65		9
2	Anatoliy Dovhal	Ukraine	6.70		7
3	Dariusz Kuć	Poland	6.73		6
4	Iván Mocholí	Spain	6.74		5
5	Ronny Ostwald	Germany	6.74		4
6	Nipa Tran	Finland	6.75		3
7	Francesco Scuderi	Italy	6.75		2
8	Aleksandr Smirnov	Russia	6.76		1

=== 400 metres ===
Rank	Heat	Name	Nationality	Time	Notes	Points
1	A	Daniel Dąbrowski	Poland	46.62		9
2	B	Ruwen Faller	Germany	46.89		7
3	B	Aleksey Rachkovskiy	Ukraine	47.01		6
4	A	Santiago Ezquerro	Spain	47.12		5
5	A	Dmitry Forshev	Russia	47.95		4
6	A	Jacopo Marin	Italy	48.04		3
7	B	Ari Kauppinen	Finland	48.40		2
	B	Fadil Bellaabous	France	DQ		0

=== 800 metres ===
Rank	Name	Nationality	Time	Notes	Points
1	Juan de Dios Jurado	Spain	1:49.50		9
2	Maurizio Bobbato	Italy	1:50.05		7
3	René Herms	Germany	1:50.06		6
4	Ivan Nesterov	Russia	1:50.35		5
5	Antoine Martiak	France	1:50.53		4
6	Grzegorz Krzosek	Poland	1:50.67		3
7	Juha Kukkamo	Finland	1:50.97		2
8	Vitaliy Voloshin	Ukraine	1:52.76		1

=== 1500 metres ===
Rank	Name	Nationality	Time	Notes	Points
1	Sergio Gallardo	Spain	3:49.77		9
2	Guillaume Éraud	France	3:50.66		7
3	Vasyl Tsikalo	Ukraine	3:50.74		6
4	Christian Obrist	Italy	3:51.10		5
5	Sergey Ivanov	Russia	3:51.14		4
6	Jonas Hamm	Finland	3:51.43		3
7	Ireneusz Sekretarski	Poland	3:51.51		2
8	Jonas Stifel	Germany	3:51.80		1

=== 3000 metres ===
Rank	Name	Nationality	Time	Notes	Points
1	Jan Fitschen	Germany	7:58.08		9
2	Badre Din Zioini	France	8:03.63		7
3	Francisco Javier Alves	Spain	8:04.78		6
4	Cosimo Caliandro	Italy	8:05.62		5
5	Pavel Shapovalov	Russia	8:07.93		4
6	Ivan Babaryka	Ukraine	8:10.60		3
7	Łukasz Parszczyński	Poland	8:13.55		2
8	Konstantin Kutilainen	Finland	8:23.89		1

=== 60 metres hurdles ===
Rank	Name	Nationality	Time	Notes	Points
1	Ladji Doucouré	France	7.62		9
2	Mike Fenner	Germany	7.69		7
3	Olli Talsi	Finland	7.74		6
4	Tomasz Ścigaczewski	Poland	7.74		5
5	Sergey Demydyuk	Ukraine	7.75		4
6	Andrea Giaconi	Italy	7.75		3
7	Iban Maiza	Spain	7.82	=PB	2
8	Yakov Petrov	Russia	7.88		1

=== Swedish relay (800/600/400/200 metres) ===
Rank	Nation	Athletes	Time	Note	Points
1	Russia	Yuriy Koldin, Dmitriy Bogdanov, Alexander Usov, Ivan Teplych	4:15.93		9
2	France	Romain Maquin, Kévin Hautcœur, Brice Panel, Idrissa M'Barke	4:16.20		7
3	Germany	Moritz Waldmann, Steffen Co, Florian Seitz, Sebastian Ernst	4:17.39		6
4	Ukraine	Maksim Shudin, Andriy Tverdostup, Vitaliy Dubonosov, Myhaylo Knysh	4:17.99		5
5	Poland	Yared Shegumo, Piotr Kędzia, Marcin Marciniszyn, Marcin Jędrusiński	4:20.62		4
6	Finland	Niclas Sandells, Jouni Haatainen, Ari Kauppinen, Samsa Tuikka	4:31.57		3
	Italy	Livio Sciandra, Davide Rodia, Filippo Michele Reina, Stefano Dacastello	DQ	R170.8	0
	Spain	Miguel Quesada, Eugenio Barrios, David Testa, Iván Mocholí	DQ	R170.8	0

=== High jump ===
Rank	Name	Nationality	2.10	2.15	2.20	2.23	2.26	2.28	Result	Notes	Points
1	Ivan Ukhov	Russia	–	o	xo	o	o	xxx	2.26		9
2	Andrea Bettinelli	Italy	–	o	xo	o	xo	xxx	2.26		7
3	Javier Bermejo	Spain	o	o	o	xo	xxo	xxx	2.26		6
4	Aleksander Waleriańczyk	Poland	–	o	o	xo	xxx		2.23		5
5	Hervé Paris	France	o	o	xo	xxx			2.20		4
6	Artem Kozbanov	Ukraine	o	xxo	xo	xxx			2.20		3
7	Osku Torro	Finland	xo	xo	xxo	xxx			2.20		2
8	Roman Fricke	Germany	o	xxo	xxx				2.15		1

=== Long jump ===
Rank	Name	Nationality	#1	#2	#3	#4	Result	Notes	Points
1	Oleksy Lukashevych	Ukraine	x	7.80	x	7.88	7.88		9
2	Salim Sdiri	France	x	7.85	x	–	7.85		7
3	Peter Rapp	Germany	7.69	7.82	7.73	x	7.82		6
4	Marcin Starzak	Poland	7.59	7.75	6.16	x	7.75		5
5	Ferdinando Iucolano	Italy	7.70	7.68	7.68	7.67	7.70		4
6	Vladimir Malyavin	Russia	7.54	7.63	7.46	7.62	7.63		3
7	Alberto Sanz	Spain	7.57	x	x	x	7.57		2
8	Samir Abbissi	Finland	6.91	7.41	7.13	x	7.41		1

=== Shot put ===
Rank	Name	Nationality	#1	#2	#3	#4	Result	Notes	Points
1	Tomasz Majewski	Poland	19.63	19.90	20.59	20.60	20.60		9
2	Ralf Bartels	Germany	20.50	20.59	20.52	19.90	20.59		7
3	Manuel Martínez	Spain	19.65	19.83	19.80	20.09	20.09		6
4	Gaëtan Bucki	France	x	18.06	19.69	x	19.69		5
5	Ville Tiisanoja	Finland	18.26	18.68	19.08	18.97	19.08		4
6	Andrey Borodkin	Ukraine	18.98	x	18.68	x	18.98		3
7	Marco Dodoni	Italy	18.96	18.66	18.60	17.97	18.96		2
8	Oleg Korotkov	Russia	17.10	18.06	18.24	18.22	18.24		1

== Women's results ==
=== 60 metres ===
Rank	Name	Nationality	Time	Notes	Points
1	Christine Arron	France	7.16		9
2	Olga Khalandyreva	Russia	7.29		7
3	Angela Moroșanu	Romania	7.32		6
4	Marion Wagner	Germany	7.43		5
5	Iwona Brzezińska	Poland	7.46		4
6	Olga Andreyeva	Ukraine	7.47		3
7	Belén Recio	Spain	7.48		2
8	Emma Rienas	Sweden	7.54		1

=== 400 metres ===
Rank	Heat	Name	Nationality	Time	Notes	Points
1	A	Tatyana Veshkurova	Russia	51.67		9
2	A	Monika Bejnar	Poland	52.45	NR	7
3	B	Claudia Hoffmann	Germany	52.69		6
4	A	Ionela Tîrlea-Manolache	Romania	53.08		5
5	B	Liliya Lobanova	Ukraine	53.52		4
6	A	Aurore Kassambara	France	54.16		3
7	B	Emma Agerbjer	Sweden	55.32		2
8	B	Laia Forcadell	Spain	55.91		1

=== 800 metres ===
Rank	Name	Nationality	Time	Notes	Points
1	Maria Cioncan	Romania	2:02.21		9
2	Ewelina Sętowska	Poland	2:02.58		7
3	Svetlana Cherkasova	Russia	2:02.78		6
4	Laetitia Valdonado	France	2:04.09		5
5	Montse Mas	Spain	2:05.45		4
6	Kerstin Werner	Germany	2:05.74		3
7	Nataliya Lupu	Ukraine	2:06.09		2
8	Carolina Nylén	Sweden	2:07.34		1

=== 1500 metres ===
Rank	Name	Nationality	Time	Notes	Points
1	Olga Komyagina	Russia	4:10.23		9
2	Anna Jakubczak	Poland	4:13.23		7
3	Natalya Tobias	Ukraine	4:15.39		6
4	Elena Iagăr	Romania	4:17.22		5
5	Irene Alfonso	Spain	4:19.86		4
6	Valérie Leheutre	France	4:20.93		3
7	Ulrika Johansson	Sweden	4:21.21		2
8	Katrin Judith Trauth	Germany	4:22.70		1

=== 3000 metres ===
Rank	Name	Nationality	Time	Notes	Points
1	Yekaterina Volkova	Russia	8:59.70		9
2	Antje Möldner	Germany	9:01.07		7
3	Tatyana Holovchenko	Ukraine	9:04.88		6
4	Christine Bardelle	France	9:09.02		5
5	Cristina Casandra	Romania	9:09.43		4
6	Sylwia Ejdys	Poland	9:19.46		3
7	Zulema Fuentes-Pila	Spain	9:24.99		2
	Flo Jonsson	Sweden	DNF		0

=== 60 metres hurdles ===
Rank	Name	Nationality	Time	Notes	Points
1	Susanna Kallur	Sweden	7.95		9
2	Glory Alozie	Spain	7.99		7
3	Aurelia Trywiańska	Poland	8.00		6
4	Kirsten Bolm	Germany	8.00		5
5	Aleksandra Antonova	Russia	8.16		4
6	Viorica Țigău	Romania	8.16		3
7	Nicole Ramalalanirina	France	8.17		2
8	Yevgeniya Snihur	Ukraine	8.21		1

=== Swedish relay (800/600/400/200 metres) ===
Rank	Nation	Athletes	Time	Note	Points
1	Russia	Irina Vashentseva, Mariya Dryakhlova, Tatyana Firova, Natalya Ivanova	4:47.48		9
2	Romania	Mihaela Neacsu, Iuliana Popescu, Angela Moroșanu, Ionela Tîrlea-Manolache	4:49.96		7
3	Poland	Lidia Chojecka, Małgorzata Pskit, Marta Chrust-Rożej, Grażyna Prokopek	4:50.96		6
4	France	Laura Tavares, Virginnie Fouguet, Thélia Sigére, Lina Jacques-Sébastien	4:52.28		5
5	Ukraine	Tamara Tverdostup, Soya Nesterenko, Oksana Shcherbak, Irina Shtanyeyeva	4:52.86		4
6	Germany	Jana Hartmann, Julia-Kristin Kunz, Jana Neubert, Birgit Rockmeier	4:54.48		3
7	Spain	Mayte Martínez, Marlén Estévez, Begoña Garrido, Belén Recio	4:55.36		2
8	Sweden	Charlotte Schönbeck, Carolina Nylén, Ulrika Johansson, Emma Agerbjer	5:04.97		1

=== Pole vault ===
Rank	Name	Nationality	3.90	4.10	4.25	4.40	4.50	4.55	4.60	4.80	4.92	Result	Notes	Points
1	Anna Rogowska	Poland	–	–	–	xo	–	–	xo	xo	xxx	4.80	NR	9
2	Tatyana Polnova	Russia	–	–	o	xo	xo	xxx				4.50		7
3	Martina Strutz	Germany	–	xo	o	o	xxx					4.40		6
4	Natalya Kushch	Ukraine	–	o	o	xo	xxx					4.40		5
5	Naroa Agirre	Spain	o	o	o	xxx						4.25		4
6	Caroline Bocquet	France	o	o	xxx							4.10		3
7	Linda Persson	Sweden	o	xxo	xxx							4.10		2
		Romania										DNS		0

=== Triple jump ===
Rank	Name	Nationality	#1	#2	#3	#4	Result	Notes	Points
1	Oksana Rogova	Russia	x	14.08	x	x	14.08		9
2	Mariana Solomon	Romania	x	x	14.04	x	14.04		7
3	Theresa N'Zola	France	13.73	13.97	x	13.66	13.97		6
4	Carlota Castrejana	Spain	13.45	13.94	x	13.76	13.94		5
5	Aneta Sadach	Poland	13.85	13.69	x	13.53	13.85		4
6	Camilla Johansson	Sweden	13.32	13.28	13.63	x	13.63		3
7	Olha Saladukha	Ukraine	13.56	13.59	x	13.59	13.59		2
8	Frauke Thrun	Germany	x	x	12.94	12.99	12.99		1
