= Kim Wall (sprinter) =

British sprinter (born 1983)

Personal information
- Born: Kimberly Wall; 21 April 1983 (43 years, 210 days old)
- Home town: Chelmsford, England
- Education: Loughborough University
- Height: 173 cm (5 ft 8 in)
- Weight: 55 kg (121 lb)

Sport
- Country: Great Britain
- Sport: Sport of athletics
- Event: 400 metres
- Club: BAS; Basildon Athletic Club
- Coached by: Nick Dakin; Adam Beard

Achievements and titles
- National finals: 1999 British U20s; • 400m, 3rd (bronze); 2002 British U20s; • 400m, 1st (gold); 2003 British U23s; • 400m, 4th; 2004 British Indoors; • 400m, 6th; 2004 British Champs; • 400m, 8th; 2005 British Indoors; • 400m, 1st (gold); 2005 British U23s; • 400m, 2nd (silver); 2006 British Champs; • 400m, 8th; 2007 British Indoors; • 400m, 3rd (bronze); 2007 British Champs; • 400m, 5th; 2008 British Champs; • 400m, 4th; 2009 British Indoors; • 400m, 3rd (bronze); 2009 British Champs; • 400m, 3rd (bronze); 2010 British Indoors; • 400m, 1st (gold); 2010 British Champs; • 400m, 5th
- Personal bests: 400m: 52.11 (2008); 300m: 37.72 (2008); 200m: 23.60 (2005)
Medal record
Women's athletics
Representing Great Britain
World Indoor Championships
Bronze medal – third place	2010 Doha	4 × 400 m relay
World U20 Championships
Gold medal – first place	2000 Santiago	4 × 400 m relay
Silver medal – second place	2002 Kingston	4 × 400 m relay
European Indoor Championships
Bronze medal – third place	2007 Birmingham	4 × 400 m relay
Silver medal – second place	2009 Turin	4 × 400 m relay
European U20 Championships
Bronze medal – third place	2001 Grosseto	400 m
Gold medal – first place	2001 Grosseto	4 × 400 m relay
European U23 Championships
Silver medal – second place	2003 Bydgoszcz	4 × 400 m relay
Silver medal – second place	2005 Erfurt	4 × 400 m relay
Representing England
Commonwealth Games
Silver medal – second place	2006 Melbourne	4 × 100 m relay
Commonwealth Youth Games
Gold medal – first place	2000 Edinburgh	400 m
- Updated on November 2024

Kimberly Wall (born 21 April 1983) is an English former sprinter specializing in the 400 metres and the 2010 World Athletics Indoor Championships bronze medalist in the 4 × 400 m relay. She also won eight continental medals throughout her career, mostly as a member of the British 4 × 400 m relay team which spanned from the 1990s through her retirement in 2012. She was controversially not selected for the four-woman British 4 × 400 m team at the 2008 Summer Olympics despite finishing 4th at that year's national championships.

== Career ==
Wall was a "star sprinter" throughout the 1990s, winning multiple English Schools' Athletics Championships and AAA Championships age group titles before she began her international career in 1999. She placed 3rd in the 400 m at the British U20 Athletics Championships and was selected to represent Great Britain in the 200 m at the 1999 World U20 Championships, where she nearly qualified for the finals by finishing 3rd in her semi-final. She also competed at the 1999 European Athletics Junior Championships, finishing 5th in her 200 m heat and placing 4th leading off in the 4 × 400 m final.

In 2000, Wall qualified for the first Commonwealth Youth Games, winning her first international gold medal in the 400 m representing England. English teams also won gold medals in the 4 × 400 m and 4 × 100 m, but whether or not Wall was a member of those teams is unknown. At the 2000 World U20 Championships, Wall competed in the finals of the individual 200 m (progressing through 4 rounds) and the 4 × 400 m relay. Though she finished 8th in the 200 m finals, her 4 × 400 m team which she led off for won the gold medal ahead of Jamaica and Romania.

At the 2001 European Athletics Junior Championships, Wall won a bronze medal in the 400 m and won another gold leading off the British 4 × 400 m team. In 2002, Wall notched a U20 national title in the 400 m, qualifying her for her second World U20 Championships appearance in both the 400 m and relay. Though she finished 5th in her 400 m semi-final, she won a silver medal in the 4 × 400 m relay, setting a national U20 record of 3:30.46 in the process.

Wall finished 4th in the 400 m at her first national U23 championships in 2003, which wasn't high enough to qualify individually for the 2003 European Athletics U23 Championships but did place her on the 4 × 400 m relay team. Running 3rd leg, Wall won another silver medal behind Russia. At her first senior nationals, Wall finished 6th at the 2004 British Indoor Athletics Championships and won the 'B' heat of the 400 m at that year's outdoor championships and Olympic trials, placing her 8th on time. She wasn't selected for the British 2004 Olympic team.

Wall earned her first senior national title in 2005, winning the 400 m at the AAA Indoor Championships and upsetting Catherine Murphy in the process. In her first continental championships at the 2005 European Indoors, Wall set a personal best of 53.02 seconds but was the first to miss qualifying for the finals. Outdoors, she won the 4 × 400 m relay at the European Cup First League Group B before placing runner-up at the British U23 Championships in the 400 m behind Christine Ohuruogu. At the 2005 European Athletics U23 Championships, Wall qualified for finals in the 400 m, 4 × 400 m, and the 4 × 100 m. Her 4 × 100 m team was disqualified for leaving the assigned lane early before the breakline, but she finished 6th in the 400 m and won the silver 4 × 400 m medal behind Russia. Wall finished her season at the 2005 World University Games, qualifying for the semi-finals of the 200 m and finishing 4th in the 4 × 400 m.

At her only senior Commonwealth Games in March 2006, Wall was selected to compete in the 400 m and both relays. She failed to advance past the 400 m semi-finals, and her 4 × 400 m team she led off for was disqualified due to their later legs not waiting in the correct position. However, Wall won a silver medal for England in the 4 × 100 m. She finished 8th in that year's outdoor championships.

Wall placed 3rd at the 2007 British Indoor Athletics Championships, qualifying her to compete in the 4 × 400 m relay at the European Indoor Championships where she won bronze behind Belarus and Russia. She finished 5th at the outdoor national championships in the 400 m that year.

Wall was in a good position to be selected for the British Olympic team going into the 2008 season, with three individual 400 m spots and six relay pool spots available. She finished a career-best 4th at the 2008 British Athletics Championships behind only Lee McConnell, Vicky Barr, and Donna Fraser. However, she was controversially not selected to the relay pool and the team that Great Britain eventually did run in the 4 × 400 m consisted entirely of athletes who didn't run the 400 m at the national championships. "I just missed out in 2008 and that broke my heart really, I thought I should have been selected for that.", Wall said in retrospect.

She again finished 3rd at the 2009 British Indoor Athletics Championships and won a relay silver medal at the 2009 European Indoor Championships. Outdoors, Wall improved her best nationals finish to 3rd at the British Athletics Championships.

Wall won her first senior global medal in 2010, selected to compete at the 2010 World Indoor 4 × 400 m relay after winning the 2010 British Indoor Athletics Championships 400 m. Leading off for Great Britain, her team finished in bronze position behind the United States and Czech Republic. Outdoors, Wall finished 6th in the 400 m and 4th in the 4 × 400 m at the 2010 European Team Championships Super League.

Wall continued to compete internationally over the next two years, but she didn't run at the 2011 or 2012 British Athletics Championships and didn't qualify for any further international teams. She retired after not being selected to represent Great Britain at the 2012 Summer Olympics.

== Personal life ==
Wall was born on 21 April 1983 and grew up in Chelmsford, England. She studied at Loughborough University. She trained at the Basildon Athletic Club with coaches Nick Dakin and Adam Beard.

In the years following her 2001 season, Wall struggled with illness including glandular fever.

== Statistics ==
=== Personal best progression ===
400m progression
#	Mark	Pl.	Competition	Venue	Date	Ref.
1	54.58	3rd place, bronze medalist(s)	NC-j	Bedford, Great Britain	3 Jul 1999	
2	54.41	3rd place, bronze medalist(s)		Bath, Somerset	15 Sep 2000	
3	54.04	3rd place, bronze medalist(s)	Aqua-Pura	Loughborough, Great Britain	19 May 2001	
4	53.52	3rd place, bronze medalist(s)	European Junior Championships	Grosseto, Italy	19 Jul 2001	
5	53.07	(bronze) (Round 1)	Atletica	Genève, Switzerland	11 Jun 2004	
6	53.02 sh	(bronze) (Heat 1)	European Athletics Indoor Championships	Madrid, Spain	3 Mar 2005	
7	52.88	(gold) (Round 3)		Loughborough, Great Britain	21 May 2005	
8	52.59	3rd place, bronze medalist(s)	Venizelia Meeting	Haniá, Greece	5 Jun 2005	
9	52.20	(gold) (Round 1)	International Meeting - Atletica Genève	Genève, Switzerland	10 Jun 2005	
