= 2005 European Athletics U23 Championships – Women's 400 metres =

The women's 400 metres event at the 2005 European Athletics U23 Championships was held in Erfurt, Germany, at Steigerwaldstadion on 15 and 16 July.

== Medalists ==
Gold	Olga Zaytseva; Russia
Silver	Christine Ohuruogu; Great Britain
Bronze	Yelena Migunova; Russia

== Results ==
=== Final ===
16 July

Rank	Name	Nationality	Time	Notes
1st place, gold medalist(s)	Olga Zaytseva	Russia	50.72	CR
2nd place, silver medalist(s)	Christine Ohuruogu	Great Britain	50.73	
3rd place, bronze medalist(s)	Yelena Migunova	Russia	51.59	
4	Anastasiya Ovchinnikova	Russia	52.24	
5	Phara Anacharsis	France	52.44	
6	Kim Wall	Great Britain	52.84	
7	Liliya Lobanova	Ukraine	52.87	
8	Yulianna Yushchanka	Belarus	52.93	

=== Heats ===
15 July
Qualified: first 2 in each heat and 2 best to the Final

==== Heat 1 ====
Rank	Name	Nationality	Time	Notes
1	Olga Zaytseva	Russia	51.69	Q
2	Christine Ohuruogu	Great Britain	51.85	Q
3	Phara Anacharsis	France	52.74	q
4	Yulianna Yushchanka	Belarus	52.88	q
5	Joanne Cuddihy	Ireland	53.66	
6	Annemarie Schulte	Netherlands	53.93	
7	Izabela Kostruba-Rój	Poland	54.94	

==== Heat 2 ====
Rank	Name	Nationality	Time	Notes
1	Yelena Migunova	Russia	51.82	Q
2	Kim Wall	Great Britain	52.85	Q
3	Katsiaryna Bobryk	Belarus	53.22	
4	Zsófia Rózsa	Hungary	54.54	
5	Alissa Kallinicou	Cyprus	55.66	

==== Heat 3 ====
Rank	Name	Nationality	Time	Notes
1	Anastasiya Ovchinnikova	Russia	52.53	Q
2	Liliya Lobanova	Ukraine	52.70	Q
3	Lisa Miller	Great Britain	53.43	
4	Johanna Monthe	France	53.57	
5	Bożena Łukasik	Poland	53.78	
6	Pınar Saka	Turkey	54.80	

== Participation ==
According to an unofficial count, 18 athletes from 11 countries participated in the event.

- Belarus (2)
- Cyprus (1)
- France (2)
- Hungary (1)
- Ireland (1)
- Netherlands (1)
- Poland (2)
- Russia (3)
- Turkey (1)
- Ukraine (1)
- United Kingdom (3)
