= 2007 British Indoor Athletics Championships =

- Dates: 10–11 February
- Host city: Sheffield
- Venue: EIS Sheffield
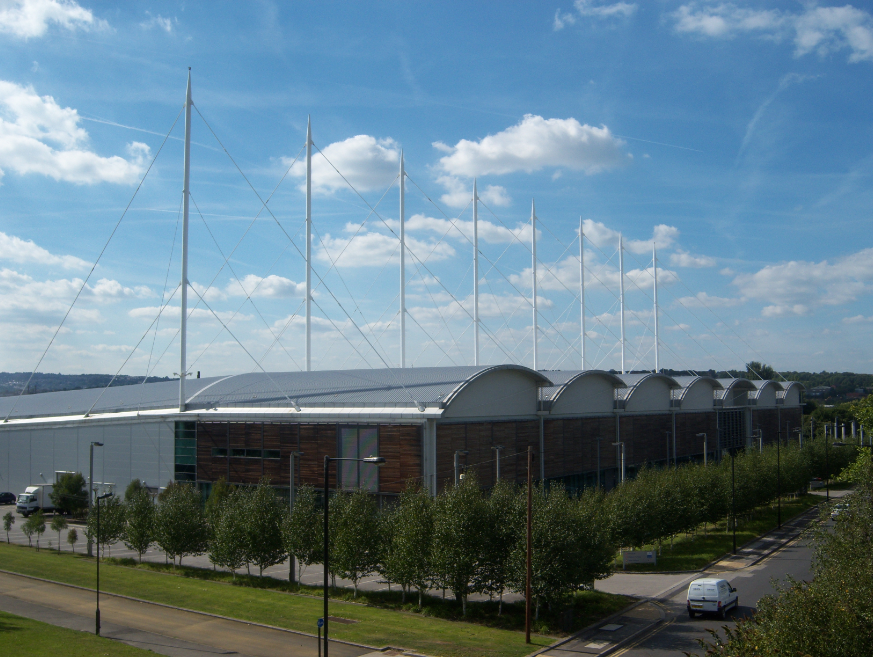
- Level: Senior national
- Type: Indoor
- Events: 24

The 2007 British Indoor Athletics Championships was the 1st edition of the national championship in indoor track and field for the United Kingdom, organised by UK Athletics. It replaced the AAA Indoor Championships run by the Amateur Athletic Association of England, which had been the de facto national indoor championship since 1935. It was held from 10 to 11 February at the English Institute of Sport, Sheffield, England. A total of 24 events (divided evenly between the sexes) were contested over the two-day competition.

== Medal summary ==
=== Men ===
Event	Gold		Silver		Bronze	
60 metres	Craig Pickering	6.58	Ryan Scott	6.64	Simeon Williamson	6.65
200 metres	Rikki Fifton	21.06	Somto Eruchie	21.11	Jeffrey Lawal-Balogun	21.22
400 metres	Gareth Warburton	48.02	Steven Green	48.04	Brian Doyle	48.28
800 metres	James Brewer	1:49.03	Richard Hill	1:49.28	James Nasrat	1:49.51
1500 metres	Chris Warburton	3:56.47	James Thie	3:56.64	Colin McCourt	3:56.66
3000 metres	Mo Farah	7:50.86	Nick McCormick	8:01.35	Lee Merrien	8:06.86
60 metres hurdles	Andy Turner	7.55	Allan Scott	7.76	William Sharman	7.84
High jump	Martyn Bernard	2.23 m	Robert Mitchell	2.23 m	Tom Parsons	2.19 m
Pole vault	Steven Lewis	5.50 m	Luke Cutts	5.30 m	Scott Simpson	5.15 m
Long jump	Bernard Yeboah	7.50 m	Jonathan Moore	7.49 m	Chris Kirk	7.38 m
Triple jump	Nathan Douglas	17.19 m	Phillips Idowu	16.68 m	Julian Golley	15.95 m
Shot put	Garrett Johnson; United States	18.98 m	Chris Gaviglio; Australia	18.05 m	Emeka Udechuku	17.64 m

=== Women ===
Event	Gold		Silver		Bronze	
60 metres	Laura Turner-Alleyne	7.25	Jeanette Kwakye	7.26	Montell Douglas	7.33
200 metres	Kadi-Ann Thomas	23.68	Susan Deacon	24.03	Perri Shakes-Drayton	24.09
400 metres	Nicola Sanders	50.60	Emma Duck	53.57	Kim Wall	53.68
800 metres	Marilyn Okoro	2:04.39	Jenny Meadows	2:04.40	Karen Cudby	2:06.21
1500 metres	Katrina Wootton	4:17.90	Ellie Stevens-Meany	4:21.00	Orla Drumm	4:21.12
3000 metres	Lisa Dobriskey	8:55.22	Helen Clitheroe	8:58.27	Jo Ankier	9:26.17
60 metres hurdles	Sara McGreavy-Wills	8.03	Sarah Claxton	8.05	Jessica Ennis-Hill	8.18
High jump	Jessica Ennis-Hill	1.87 m	Susan Moncrieff	1.84 m	Julie Crane	1.84 m
Pole vault	Kate Dennison	4.35 m	Kirsty Maguire	4.10 m	Ellie Kormis	4.00 m
Long jump	Amy Harris-Willock	6.47 m	Gillian Cooke	6.33 m	Jessica Ennis-Hill	6.15 m
Triple jump	Ashia Hansen	13.68 m	Nadia Williams	13.29 m	Gillian Kerr	12.83 m
Shot put	Joanne Duncan	16.45 m	Dayana Octavien	15.86 m	Rebecca Peake	15.51 m
