= Athletics at the 2000 Commonwealth Youth Games =

Athletics at the I Commonwealth Youth Games
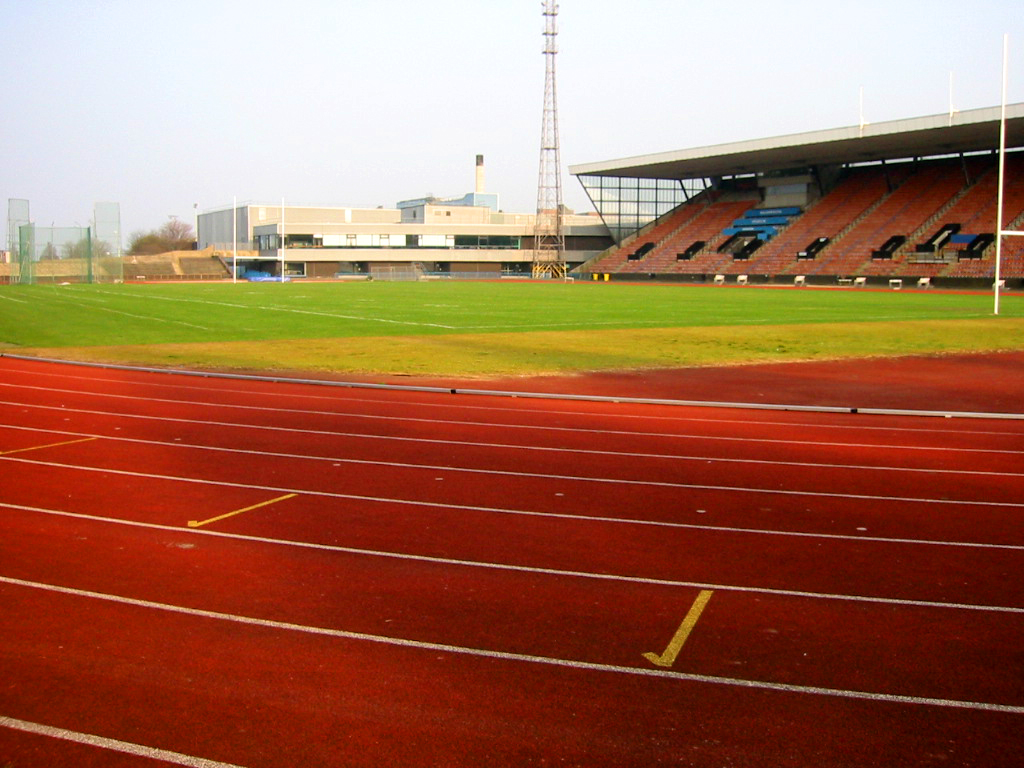
- The track at the host stadium
- Dates: 11 – 13 August
- Host city: Edinburgh, Scotland
- Venue: Meadowbank Stadium
- Events: 30

At the 2000 Commonwealth Youth Games, the athletics events were held at the Meadowbank Stadium in Edinburgh, Scotland from 11 to 13 August. A total of 30 events were contested, divided equally between the sexes. Among the medallists were Nicola Sanders, the 2007 World Championships runner-up in the 400 metres, and Johan Cronje (bronze medallist at the 2013 World Championships in Athletics in the 1500 metres).

== Medal summary ==
=== Medal table ===
* Host nation ( SCO)

Rank	Nation	Gold	Silver	Bronze	Total
1	ENG	15	7	6	28
2	RSA	10	9	6	25
3	AUS	4	6	10	20
4	WAL	0	4	3	7
5	SCO*	0	2	4	6
6	NIR	0	1	0	1
Totals (6 entries)		29	29	29	87

== Boys ==
Event	Gold		Silver		Bronze	
100 metres	Tyrone Edgar (ENG)	11.0 GR	Marthinus van der Vyver (RSA)	11.0	Seriashe Childs (WAL)	11.0
200 metres	Dwaine Grant (ENG)	21.15 GR	Gareth Roelf (RSA)	21.42	Tim Abeyie (ENG)	21.47
400 metres	Jacob Ramokoka (RSA)	47.11 GR	Mark van Soest (RSA)	47.70	Sam Ellis (ENG)	48.40
800 metres	Johan Cronje (RSA)	1:51.32 GR	Michael Coltherd (ENG)	1:52.09	James Nasrat (WAL)	1:52.35
1500 metres	Ricky Soos (ENG)	4:00.30 GR	Johan Cronje (RSA)	4:00.32	Mitchell Kealey (AUS)	4:02.71
110 metres hurdles	Dominic Girdler (ENG)	14.20 GR	Ryan Purcell (AUS)	14.27	Brenden Harmse (RSA)	14.33
400 metres hurdles	Ter de Villiers (RSA)	50.7 GR	Stephen Murphy (SCO)	53.2	Elliott Wood (AUS)	53.7
4 × 100 m relay	England (ENG); Monu Miah; Dwaine Grant; Tyrone Edgar; Tim Abeyie	47.25 GR	Wales (WAL); Gethyn McFall; Nick Hiscott; Gareth Llewellyn; Seriashe Childs	47.45	Australia (AUS); Scott Wells; Henari Veratau; Ryan Purcell; Jarrem Pearce	47.49
4 × 400 m relay	South Africa (RSA); Gareth Roelf; Mark van Soest; Jacob Ramokoka; Ismael Abrahams	3:12.55 GR	England (ENG); Robert Tobin; Sam Ellis; Dwaine Grant; Tim Abeyie	3:17.10	Scotland (SCO); Jonathan Simpson; Stephen Murphy; Chris Watson; Craig Erskine	3:18.44
High jump	James Watson (AUS)	2.09 m GR	Terry Wepener (RSA)	2.09 m	Chuka Enih-Snell (WAL)	2.09 m
Long jump	Nico Grimbeeck (RSA)	7.18 m GR	Leigh Smith (ENG)	7.09 m	Erik Surjan (AUS)	7.06 m
Triple jump	Jonathan Moore (ENG)	16.02 m GR	Owen O'Reilly (RSA)	14.47 m	Patrick Coleman (AUS)	14.15 m
Shot put	Greg Beard (ENG)	16.73 m GR	Gregory Holmes (AUS)	16.49 m	Johannes Fick (RSA)	16.10 m
Discus throw	Timothy Driesen (AUS)	50.37 m GR	Robert Morris (ENG)	48.64 m	Werner Smit (RSA)	47.22 m
Hammer throw	Riaan Smit (RSA)	66.70 m GR	Peter Field (ENG)	61.96 m	Timothy Driesen (AUS)	60.47 m

== Girls ==
Event	Gold		Silver		Bronze	
100 metres	Danielle Norville (ENG)	12.14 GR	Danielle Selley (WAL)	12.21	Gemma Ryde (SCO)	12.27
200 metres	Veronica James (ENG)	24.16 GR	Eleanor Caney (ENG)	24.65	Gemma Ryde (SCO)	24.99
400 metres	Kim Wall (ENG)	54.46 GR	Lisa Miller (ENG)	54.99	Elmie Hugo (RSA)	55.30
800 metres	Jemma Simpson (ENG)	2:09.45 GR	Lisa Corrigan (AUS)	2:10.16	Dina Lebo Phalula (RSA)	2:12.93
1500 metres	Shannon Hill (AUS)	4:35.2 GR	Dina Lebo Phalula (RSA)	4:35.7	Louise Damen (ENG)	4:35.7
100 metres hurdles	Sara McGreavy (ENG)	14.12 GR	Lauren McLoughlin (WAL)	14.25	Kiara McDonald (AUS)	14.39
400 metres hurdles	Nicola Sanders (ENG)	59.19 GR	Corné Claassen (RSA)	61.80	Katie Nicholson (AUS)	62.70
4 × 100 m relay	England (ENG); Danielle Norville; Victoria Barr; Veronica James; Eleanor Caney	47.25 GR	Wales (WAL); Lowri Jones; Danielle Selley; Lauren McLoughlin; Alex Bick	47.45	Australia (AUS); Prue Robertson; Brooke Wood; Kate Pedley; Kylie Bent	47.49
4 × 400 m relay	England (ENG); Kim Wall; Lisa Miller; Veronica James; Eleanor Caney	3:45.78 GR	South Africa (RSA); Elmie Hugo; Celeste Ferreira; Michelle Louw; Vicky van Os	3:51.52	Australia (AUS); Jessica Montague; Lisa Corrigan; Katie Nicholson; Katherine Hancock	3:55.89
High jump	Marizca Gertenbach (RSA)	1.82 m GR	Aileen Wilson (SCO)	1.82 m	Samantha Adamson (ENG)	1.70 m
Long jump	Delia Visser (RSA)	6.02 m GR	Sarah Dosen (AUS)	5.94 m	Rachel Hogg (SCO)	5.77 m
Triple jump	Karen Pretorius (RSA)	11.94 m GR	Sharon Cakes (NIR)	11.93 m	Rebekah Williams (AUS)	11.90 m
Shot put	Anmaré Sullivan (RSA)	13.62 m GR	Belinda Johnson (AUS)	13.42 m	Charlotte Spelzini (ENG)	11.84 m
Discus throw	Emma Carpenter (ENG)	48.20 m GR	Samantha Fraser (AUS)	44.19 m	Tanya Bloem (RSA)	42.86 m
Hammer throw	Gabrielle Neighbour (AUS)	51.34 m GR	Laura Douglas (WAL)	48.63 m	Nicola Dudman (ENG)	45.87 m
