= 2005 European Athletics U23 Championships – Women's 4 × 400 metres relay =

The women's 4 x 400 metres relay event at the 2005 European Athletics U23 Championships was held in Erfurt, Germany, at Steigerwaldstadion on 17 July.

== Medalists ==
Gold	Anastasiya Ovchinnikova; Anastasiya Kochetova; Yelena Migunova; Olga Zaytseva; Russia
Silver	Kim Wall; Sian Scott; Lisa Miller; Christine Ohuruogu; Great Britain
Bronze	Dora Jémaa; Thélia Sigère; Johanna Monthe; Phara Anacharsis; France

== Results ==
=== Final ===
17 July

Rank	Nation	Competitors	Time	Notes
1st place, gold medalist(s)	Russia	Anastasiya Ovchinnikova; Anastasiya Kochetova; Yelena Migunova; Olga Zaytseva	3:27.27	CR
2nd place, silver medalist(s)	Great Britain	Kim Wall; Sian Scott; Lisa Miller; Christine Ohuruogu	3:31.64	
3rd place, bronze medalist(s)	France	Dora Jémaa; Thélia Sigère; Johanna Monthe; Phara Anacharsis	3:31.91	
4	Poland	Izabela Kostruba-Rój; Jolanta Wójcik; Anna Nentwig; Bożena Łukasik	3:34.26	
5	Germany	Katharina Gröb; Anja Pollmächer; Sandra Schmadtke; Julia-Kristin Kunz	3:37.18	
	Belarus	Katsiaryna Bobryk; Natallia Chabatar; Volha Varabei; Yulianna Yuschanka	DQ	IAAF rule 170.9

== Participation ==
According to an unofficial count, 24 athletes from 6 countries participated in the event.

- Belarus (4)
- France (4)
- Germany (4)
- Great Britain (4)
- Poland (4)
- Russia (4)
