= English Schools' Athletics Championships =

The English Schools' Athletics Championships are annual national athletics competitions organised by the English Schools' Athletic Association ESAA for students in England aged 12–18 for track and field, cross country and race walking.

The events are used to select the English team for the Schools International Athletics Board competitions (which involve England, Scotland, Wales, and Northern Ireland) and the ISF World Schools' Cross Country Championships and World Schools Track & Field Championships.

== Age groups ==
Age groups for the championships are defined based on a student's age on 31 August of the school year in which the competition is held as follows:

| Group (Boys, Girls) | Age at 31 August | Age at Event | School Year |
|---|---|---|---|
| Junior (JB, JG) | 13–14 | 12–14 | 8–9 |
| Intermediate (IB, IG) | 15–16 | 14–16 | 10–11 |
| Senior (SB, SG) | 17–18 | 16–18 | 12–13 |

== Track and field championships ==
The track and field championships have been held every year since 1925 (except for 1940–1945 due to World War II), are the 4th largest athletics event in the world and since 2003 have been held at the major athletics venues of Birmingham Alexander Stadium, Sportscity, Manchester, Gateshead International Stadium and former Sheffield Don Valley Stadium.

To be eligible to compete students must attain an entry standard. Each county selects a team for the championships from the eligible students attending schools in their area subject to various constraints including maximum team sizes and students only being allowed to participate in a single individual event at the championships. Teams earn points based on the finishing position of their students in each event and their performances levels. The teams compete for various trophies based on their points earned. Since 1951 Essex have attained the overall highest points total the most times.

=== Championship records ===
==== Boy's ====
Junior (13-14)
| Event | Mark | Athlete | County | Year |
|---|---|---|---|---|
| 100 m | 10.64 | Divine Ebechukwu Iheme | Oxfordshire | 2024 |
| 200 m | 21.99 | Remi Jokosenumi | Middlesex | 2018 |
| 300 m | 34.81 | Amir Sultan - Edwards | London | 2018 |
| 800 m | 1:56.00 | Findlay Mclaren | Essex | 2023 |
| 1500 m | 4:03.60 | Douglas Stones | Humberside | 1979 |
| 80 m hurdles (84cm) | 10.50 | Joseph Harding | Essex | 2017 |
| 4 × 100 m relay | 43.33 | | Surrey | 2025 |
| High jump | 1.96 m | Richard Byers | Cumbria | 2005 |
| Long jump | 7.06 m | Duncan Williams | Buckinghamshire | 2026 |
| Triple jump | 14.26 m | Jomiloju Hughes | London | 2024 |
| Pole vault | 4.30 m | Neil Winter | Avon | 1988 |
| Shot put (4kg) | 18.29 m | Michael Wheeler | Surrey | 2006 |
| Discus throw (1.25kg) | 56.90 m | Kendrick Onolememen | Kent | 2026 |
| Javelin throw (600g) | 69.89 m | Hugo Bucher | Middlesex | 2025 |
| Hammer throw (4kg) | 70.78 m | Andrew Tolputt | Berkshire | 1982 |
Intermediate (15-16)
| 100 m | 10.41 | Divine Iheme | Oxfordshire | 2025 |
| 200 m | 21.32 | Sean Appiah | Essex | 2024 |
| 400 m | 47.18 | Chris Clarke | Berkshire | 2006 |
| 800 m | 1:50.93 | Michael Rimmer | Merseyside | 2002 |
| 1500 m | 3:49.15 | Matthew Shirling | Merseyside | 2012 |
| 3000 m | 8:20.00 | Kevin Steere | Norfolk | 1971 |
| 100 m hurdles (91.5cm) | 12.69 | Jaiden Dean | Norfolk | 2022 |
| 400 m hurdles (84cm) | 51.83 | Samael Lunt | Cheshire | 2022 |
| 1500 m steeplechase | 4:11.90 | Teddy Murphy | Hertfordshire | 2026 |
| 4 × 100 m relay | 41.85 | | London | 2010 |
| High jump | 2.12 m | Femi Abejide | London | 1981 |
| Long jump | 7.80 m | Daniel Emegbor | Hertfordshire | 2025 |
| Triple jump | 15.91 m | Jonathan Moore | West Midlands | 2000 |
| Pole vault | 4.87 m | Max Merriman | Surrey | 2026 |
| Shot put (5kg) | 20.48 m | Carl Myerscough | Lancashire | 1996 |
| Discus throw (1.5kg) | 61.24 m | Emeka Udechuku | London | 1995 |
| Javelin throw (700g) | 77.12 m | James Whiteaker | Kent | 2014 |
| Hammer throw (5kg) | 73.58 m | Andrew Tolputt | Berkshire | 1984 |
Senior (17-18)
| 100 m | 10.31 | Alec Williamson | Merseyside | 2026 |
| 200 m | 20.85 | Ethan Franklin | Essex | 2025 |
| 400 m | 46.26 | Mark Hylton | Berkshire | 1995 |
| 800 m | 1:48.60 | Paul Burgess | Leicestershire | 1989 |
| 1500 m | 3:45.90 | Clifton Bradeley | Staffordshire | 1984 |
| 3000 m | 8:10.50 | John Nuttall | Lancashire | 1985 |
| 110 m hurdles (99cm) | 13.69 | Jack Meredith | Merseyside | 2010 |
| 400 m hurdles (91.5cm) | 51.45 | Rayhan Mourtada | Kent | 2025 |
| 2000 m steeplechase | 5:38.20 | Spencer Duval | Staffordshire | 1989 |
| 4 × 100 m relay | 40.55 | | Essex | 2025 |
| High jump | 2.25 m | Geoff Parsons | Kent | 1983 |
| Long jump | 7.82 m | Daniel Emegbor | Middlesex | 2026 |
| Triple jump | 15.92 m | Lawrence Lynch | London | 1985 |
| Pole vault | 5.16 m | Ben Flint | South Yorkshire | 1998 |
| Shot put (6kg) | 20.64 m | Carl Myerscough | Somerset | 1998 |
| Discus throw (1.75kg) | 61.87 m | Lawrence Okoye | Surrey | 2010 |
| Javelin throw (800g) | 73.41 m | Harry Huges | Suffolk | 2016 |
| Hammer throw (6kg) | 76.84 m | Jake Norris | Berkshire | 2017 |

==== Girl's ====
Junior (13-14)
| Event | Mark | Athlete | County | Year |
|---|---|---|---|---|
| 100 m | 11.58 | Ashleigh Nelson | Staffordshire | 2005 |
| 200 m | 23.72 | Annable Fasuba | Devon | 2025 |
| 300 m | 38.61 | Isla Perry | Devon | 2025 |
| 800 m | 2:06.22 | Tilly Simpson | Derby | 2015 |
| 1500 m | 4:23.58 | Jessica Judd | Essex | 2009 |
| 75 m hurdles (76cm) | 10.90 | Pippa Earley | Surrey | 2015 |
| 4 × 100 m relay | 47.37 | | Surrey | 2012 |
| High jump | 1.77 m | Lee Haggett | London | 1986 |
| Long jump | 6.22 m | Margaret Cheetham | Merseyside | 1983 |
| Pole vault | 3.62 m | Emillie Oakden | Sussex | 2018 |
| Shot put | 14.08 m | Adanna Udechuku | Essex | 2025 |
| Discus throw (1kg) | 39.89 m | Sophie Mace | Surrey | 2013 |
| Javelin throw (500g) | 46.36 m | Mila Desborough | Dorset | 2026 |
| Hammer throw (3kg) | 58.01 m | Pheobe Baggott | Staffordshire | 2016 |
Intermediate (15-16)
| 100 m | 11.63 | Darryl Neita | London | 2012 |
| 200 m | 23.62 | Vernicha James | London | 2000 |
| 300 m | 37.93 | Cheriece Hylton | Kent | 2013 |
| 800 m | 2:03.12 | Phoebe Gill | Hertfordshire | 2023 |
| 1500 m | 4:16.24 | Georgia Peel | Hampshire | 2009 |
| 3000 m | 9:27.15 | Harriet Knowles-Jones | Greater Manchester | 2014 |
| 80 m hurdles (76cm) | 10.85 | Thea Brown | Cheshire | 2023 |
| 300 m hurdles (76cm) | 41.13 | Lucia Bertacchini | Hampshire | 2025 |
| 1500 m steeplechase | 4:52.00 | Evelyn Wildman | Greater Manchester | 2026 |
| 4 × 100 m relay | 46.10 | | Surrey | 2016 |
| High jump | 1.83 m | Aileen Wilson | Leicestershire | 2000 |
| Long jump | 6.38 m | Margaret Cheetham | Merseyside | 1985 |
| Triple jump | 12.59 m | Leila Newth | Middlesex | 2025 |
| Pole vault | 3.93 m | Molly Caudery | Cornwall | 2015 |
| Shot put (3kg) | 17.36 m | Emilia Adese | London | 2026 |
| Discus throw (1kg) | 49.36 m | Claire Smithson | Sussex | 1999 |
| Javelin throw (500g) | 52.25 m | Lucy Bull | Gloucestershire | 2026 |
| Hammer throw (3kg) | 65.06 m | Katie Head | Essex | 2016 |
Senior (17-18)
| 100 m | 11.59 | Rebecca Drummond | Staffordshire | 1995 |
| 200 m | 23.40 | Simone Jacobs | Berkshire | 1984 |
| 400 m | 53.99 | Hannah Williams | Hampshire | 2016 |
| 800 m | 2:04.40 | Khahisa Mhlanga | Essex | 2017 |
| 1500 m | 4:15.08 | Amy Griffiths | Leicestershire | 2014 |
| 3000 m | 9:04.37 | Paula Radcliffe | Bedfordshire | 1992 |
| 100 m hurdles (84cm) | 13.50 | Lesley-Anne Skeete | Somerset | 1986 |
| 400 m hurdles (76cm) | 57.81 | Hayley McLean | Essex | 2013 |
| 1500 m steeplechase | 4:40.23 | Victoria Weir | Devon | 2016 |
| 4 × 100 m relay | 46.80 | | Surrey | 2017 |
| High jump | 1.88 m | Vikki Hubbard | Lincolnshire | 2006 |
| Pole vault | 4.20 m | Molly Caudery | Cornwall | 2017 |
| Long jump | 6.65 m | Fiona May | Derbyshire | 1989 |
| Triple jump | 12.88 m | Ahtollah Rose | Greater Manchester | 2011 |
| Shot put (4kg) | 15.65 m | Eden Francis | Leicestershire | 2007 |
| Discus throw (1kg) | 52.74 m | Claire Smithson | Sussex | 2001 |
| Javelin throw (600g) | 52.68 m | Harriet Court | Kent | 2025 |
| Hammer throw (4kg) | 61.65 m | Sophie Hitchon | Lancashire | 2009 |

== Cross country championships ==
The cross country championships have been held every year since 1960 for boys and 1968 for girls (except for 2001 due to the foot-and-mouth outbreak). Originally separate events were held for boys and girls but since 1989 they have always been combined.

== Combined events and race waking championships ==
A separate championships is held each year for combined events and race walking. For combined events students compete in the track and field pentathlon (JB, JG), heptathlon (IG, SG), octathlon (IB) and decathlon (SB) events. For race walking students compete over 3000 metres (JB, JG, IG) and 5000 metres (IB, SB, SG).

== Notable competitors ==
Many competitors at the English Schools' Athletics Championships have gone on to win individual Olympic and World Championship medals including multiple gold medallists Mo Farah, Jessica Ennis-Hill, Kelly Holmes and Greg Rutherford.

Olympic and World Medallists at the English Schools' Athletics Championships
| Athlete | Olympic Medals | World Championships Medals | English Schools' Athletics Championships Results | | |
| Athlete | Olympic Medals | World Championships Medals | Senior | Intermediate | Junior |
|---|---|---|---|---|---|
| Mo Farah | (gold) 5000 m, 2016; (gold) 10,000 m, 2016; (gold) 5000 m, 2012; (gold) 10,000 m, 2012 | (gold) 10,000 m, 2017; (silver) 5000 m, 2017; (gold) 5000 m, 2015; (gold) 10,000 m, 2015; (gold) 5000 m, 2013; (gold) 10,000 m, 2013; (gold) 5000 m, 2011; (silver) 10,000 m, 2011 | (silver) 1500 m, 2001 | (gold) 1500 m, 1999; (gold) cross country, 1999; (gold) 3000 m, 1998; (silver) cross country, 1998 | (gold) 1500 m, 1997 |
| Jessica Ennis-Hill | (silver) heptathlon, 2016; (gold) heptathlon, 2012 | (gold) heptathlon, 2015; (gold) heptathlon, 2011; (gold) heptathlon, 2009 | | (gold) high Jump, 2002 | (gold) high jump, 2000; 10th, high jump, 1999; 15th, heptathlon, 1999 |
| Kelly Holmes | (gold) 800 m, 2004; (gold) 1500 m, 2004 | | | | (gold) 1500 m, 1987 |
| Greg Rutherford | (bronze) long jump, 2016; (gold) long jump, 2012 | (gold) long jump, 2015 | | 4th, long jump, 2004; 4th, long jump, 2003 | 5th, long jump, 2001 |
| Alistair Brownlee | (gold) triathlon, 2012 | | (gold) cross country, 2006 | | |
| Phillips Idowu | | (gold) triple jump, 2009 | (gold) triple jump, 1997; (silver) triple jump, 1996 | | |
| Paula Radcliffe | | (gold) marathon, 2005 | (gold) 3000 m, 1992; (gold) 1500 m, 1991 | | 8th, 1500 m, 1988 |
| Kelly Sotherton | (silver) heptathlon, 2004 | (silver) heptathlon, 2007 | (bronze) long jump, 1995; (gold) heptathlon, 1994 | (gold) heptathlon, 1992; 4th, 300 m, 1992 | |
| Darren Campbell | (silver) 200 m, 2000 | (bronze) 100 m, 2003 | | (gold) 200 m, 1989 | (bronze) 200 m, 1988 |
| Dean Macey | | (bronze) decathlon, 2001; (silver) decathlon, 1999 | (gold) decathlon, 1995 | | |
| Jonathan Brownlee | (silver) triathlon, 2012 | | 11th, cross country, 2008 | 23rd, 3000 m, 2006 | 146th, cross country, 2004 |
| Lisa Dobriskey | | (silver) 1500 m, 2009 | (gold) 1500 m, 2001 | (gold) 800 m, 1999 | (gold) 800 m, 1998; 4th, cross country, 1998; 5th, 800 m, 1997 |
| Hannah England | | (silver) 1500 m, 2011 | (silver) 1500 m, 2005 | 12th, cross country, 2003 | 5th, 1500 m, 2001; 61st, cross country, 2000 |
| Nicola Sanders | | (silver) 400 m, 2007 | (gold) 400 m hurdles, 2000; (gold) 400 m hurdles, 1999 | (silver) 300 m, 1998; 4th, 200 m, 1997 | |
| Tasha Danvers | (bronze) 400 m hurdles, 2008 | | (gold) 100 m hurdles, 1995 | (gold) 300 m hurdles, 1994; (gold) 300 m hurdles, 1993 | |
| Robert Grabarz | (bronze) high jump, 2012 | | (gold) high jump, 2005 | (silver) high jump, 2004 | |
| Sophie Hitchon | (bronze) hammer throw, 2016 | | (gold) hammer throw, 2009 | | |
| Jenny Meadows | | (bronze) 800 m, 2009 | 5th, 400 m, 1999; (silver) 400 m, 1998 | 5th, 300 m, 1997 | (gold) 800 m, 1995 |
| Andy Turner | | (bronze) 110 m hurdles, 2011 | (silver) 110 m hurdles, 1999 | (gold) 100 m hurdles, 1997 | |
