= Set Osho =

English sprinter

Personal information
- Nationality: British/Nigerian
- Born: 28 September 1986 (age 40) Nigeria

Sport
- Sport: Athletics
- Event: 400m
- Club: Belgrave Harriers

Setonji Osho (born 28 September 1986) is a former sprinter. He won the 4x400 m gold medal as part of the European junior 4x400 m Great Britain team, which also included Martyn Rooney, Richard Buck, and Richard Strachan in 2005.

== Biography ==
Osho was born in Nigeria, one of four boys born to Linda and Emanuel Osho. He lived in Nigeria until he was 6, when his parents relocated to the UK seeking a better quality of life for his younger brother Deji, who had been born with Down syndrome.

Osho grew up in Brighton and attended St Mary Magdalen Primary School, and later, Cardinal Newman Catholic School where he played football, rugby, and athletics. His favourite events were the sprint and jumps. Spotting Osho's athletic potential, after inter school sports day, a local teacher took him down to the local athletic's club Brighton & Hove AC at Withdean Stadium. Osho competed for Brighton for many years before being scouted to join the London club Belgrave Harriers.

He set a Sussex junior 400 m record, breaking Olympic champion Steve Ovett's 25-year-old mark.

In 2009 he claimed the bronze medal at the Aviva AAA National World Trials and 2009 British Athletics Championships.

== European Junior Championships 4 x 400 m relay (2005) ==
Men
Rank	Country	Athletes	Times
1	United Kingdom	Richard Buck; Set Osho; Richard Strachan; Martyn Rooney	3 min 06 s 67
2	Russia		3 min 07 s 19 (RNJ)
3	Poland		3 min 09 s 75
