= 2005 European Athletics U23 Championships – Women's 4 × 100 metres relay =

The women's 4 x 100 metres relay event at the 2005 European Athletics U23 Championships was held in Erfurt, Germany, at Steigerwaldstadion on 17 July.

== Medalists ==
Gold	Natacha Vouaux; Lina Jacques-Sébastien; Aurélie Kamga; Ayodelé Ikuesan; France
Silver	Karoline Köhler; Verena Sailer; Johanna Kedzierski; Anne Möllinger; Germany
Bronze	Claudia Baggio; Doris Tomasini; Alessia Berti; Vincenza Calì; Italy

== Results ==
=== Final ===
17 July

Rank	Nation	Competitors	Time	Notes
1st place, gold medalist(s)	France	Natacha Vouaux; Lina Jacques-Sébastien; Aurélie Kamga; Ayodelé Ikuesan	44.22	
2nd place, silver medalist(s)	Germany	Karoline Köhler; Verena Sailer; Johanna Kedzierski; Anne Möllinger	44.89	
3rd place, bronze medalist(s)	Italy	Claudia Baggio; Doris Tomasini; Alessia Berti; Vincenza Calì	45.03	
4	Switzerland	Fabienne Weyermann; Michelle Cueni; Nicole Koller; Mirjam Hess	45.45	
5	Greece	Athanasia Efstratiadou; Eleftheria Kobidou; Evaggelia Kavoura; Olga Tsobanidi	46.65	
	Russia	Yevgeniya Polyakova; Anna Yevdokimova; Yelena Yakovleva; Yekaterina Butusova	DNF	
	United Kingdom	Katherine Jones; Kim Wall; Lisa Miller; Anyika Onuora	DQ	IAAF rule 170.14

== Participation ==
According to an unofficial count, 28 athletes from 7 countries participated in the event.

- France (4)
- Germany (4)
- Greece (4)
- Italy (4)
- Russia (4)
- Switzerland (4)
- United Kingdom (4)
