= 2000 World Junior Championships in Athletics – Women's 4 × 400 metres relay =

The women's 4x400 metres relay event at the 2000 World Junior Championships in Athletics was held in Santiago, Chile, at Estadio Nacional Julio Martínez Prádanos on 21 and 22 October.

== Medalists ==
Gold	Kim Wall; Jenny Meadows; Helen Thieme; Lisa Miller; United Kingdom
Silver	Sheryl Morgan; Kareen Gayle; Anneisha McLaughlin; Melaine Walker; Jamaica
Bronze	Adela Marchis; Liliana Barbulescu; Maria Rus; Alina Rîpanu; Romania

== Results ==
=== Final ===
22 October

Rank	Nation	Competitors	Time	Notes
1st place, gold medalist(s)	United Kingdom	Kim Wall; Jenny Meadows; Helen Thieme; Lisa Miller	3:33.82	
2nd place, silver medalist(s)	Jamaica	Sheryl Morgan; Kareen Gayle; Anneisha McLaughlin; Melaine Walker	3:33.99	
3rd place, bronze medalist(s)	Romania	Adela Marchis; Liliana Barbulescu; Maria Rus; Alina Rîpanu	3:34.49	
4	Poland	Monika Bejnar; Dorota Dydo; Karolina Tłustochowska; Aneta Lemiesz	3:36.11	
5	Germany	Eileen Müller; Claudia Hoffmann; Nadine Balkow; Larissa Kettenis	3:36.70	
6	Ukraine	Svetlana Chervan; Tatyana Petlyuk; Antonina Yefremova; Natalya Pygyda	3:37.83	
7	Australia	Lauren Jauncey; Katerina Dressler; Rebecca Irwin; Jana Pittman	3:38.66	
8	New Zealand	Rachael Signal; April Brough; Anna Spriggens; Monique Williams	3:49.87	

=== Heats ===
21 October

==== Heat 1 ====
Rank	Nation	Competitors	Time	Notes
1	Germany	Eileen Müller; Claudia Hoffmann; Nadine Balkow; Larissa Kettenis	3:38.18	Q
2	United Kingdom	Heather Brookes; Jenny Meadows; Helen Thieme; Lisa Miller	3:38.38	Q
3	Ukraine	Svetlana Chervan; Tatyana Petlyuk; Antonina Yefremova; Natalya Pygyda	3:38.92	Q
	Botswana	Ramomene Boikhutso; Geoitsemodimo Dikinya; Ethel Masoloko; Orapeleng Keboifile	DQ	
	Colombia	Sira Córdoba; Rosibel García; Melisa Murillo; Norma González	DQ	

==== Heat 2 ====
Rank	Nation	Competitors	Time	Notes
1	Jamaica	Kashain Page; Sheryl Morgan; Anneisha McLaughlin; Shellene Williams	3:37.38	Q
2	Romania	Adela Marchis; Liliana Barbulescu; Maria Rus; Alina Rîpanu	3:37.65	Q
3	Poland	Dorota Wojtczak; Monika Bejnar; Dorota Dydo; Aneta Lemiesz	3:41.24	Q
4	Australia	Lauren Jauncey; Caitlin Willis; Rebecca Irwin; Katerina Dressler	3:42.45	q
5	New Zealand	Rachael Signal; April Brough; Anna Spriggens; Monique Williams	3:46.02	q

== Participation ==
According to an unofficial count, 45 athletes from 10 countries participated in the event.

- Australia (5)
- Botswana (4)
- Colombia (4)
- Germany (4)
- Jamaica (6)
- New Zealand (4)
- Poland (5)
- Romania (4)
- Ukraine (4)
- United Kingdom (5)
