= 2003 European Athletics U23 Championships – Women's 400 metres =

The women's 400 metres event at the 2003 European Athletics U23 Championships was held in Bydgoszcz, Poland, at Zawisza Stadion on 18 and 19 July.

== Medalists ==
Gold	Helen Karagounis; United Kingdom
Silver	Solene Désert; France
Bronze	Tatyana Firova; Russia

== Results ==
=== Final ===
19 July

Rank	Name	Nationality	Time	Notes
1st place, gold medalist(s)	Helen Karagounis	United Kingdom	51.78	
2nd place, silver medalist(s)	Solene Désert	France	52.05	
3rd place, bronze medalist(s)	Tatyana Firova	Russia	52.14	
4	Monika Bejnar	Poland	52.35	
5	Natalya Ivanova	Russia	52.54	
6	Claudia Hoffmann	Germany	52.81	
7	Jennifer Meadows	United Kingdom	53.17	
8	Katsiaryna Bobryk	Belarus	54.47	

=== Heats ===
18 July
Qualified: first 3 in each heat and 2 best to the Final

==== Heat 1 ====
Rank	Name	Nationality	Time	Notes
1	Solene Désert	France	52.77	Q
2	Tatyana Firova	Russia	52.80	Q
3	Jennifer Meadows	United Kingdom	53.10	Q
4	Claudia Hoffmann	Germany	53.27	q
5	Ilona Usovich	Belarus	53.81	
6	Anna Nentwig	Poland	53.99	
7	Simone Murer	Switzerland	54.66	

==== Heat 2 ====
Rank	Name	Nationality	Time	Notes
1	Helen Karagounis	United Kingdom	53.04	Q
2	Natalya Ivanova	Russia	53.15	Q
3	Katsiaryna Bobryk	Belarus	53.16	Q
4	Monika Bejnar	Poland	53.23	q
5	Lisa Miller	United Kingdom	54.55	
6	Daniela Reina	Italy	54.82	
7	Nadine Balkow	Germany	55.99	

== Participation ==
According to an unofficial count, 14 athletes from 8 countries participated in the event.

- Belarus (2)
- France (1)
- Germany (2)
- Italy (1)
- Poland (2)
- Russia (2)
- Switzerland (1)
- United Kingdom (3)
