= 2003 European Athletics U23 Championships – Women's 4 × 400 metres relay =

The women's 4 x 400 metres relay event at the 2003 European Athletics U23 Championships was held in Bydgoszcz, Poland, at Zawisza Stadion on 20 July.

== Medalists ==
Gold	Yuliya Gushchina; Natalya Ivanova; Oksana Gulumyan; Tatyana Firova; Russia
Silver	Jennifer Meadows; Danielle Halsall; Kim Wall; Helen Karagounis; United Kingdom
Bronze	Eileen Müller; Katharina Gröb; Tina Kron; Claudia Hoffmann; Germany

== Results ==
=== Final ===
20 July

Rank	Nation	Competitors	Time	Notes
1st place, gold medalist(s)	Russia	Yuliya Gushchina; Natalya Ivanova; Oksana Gulumyan; Tatyana Firova	3:29.55	
2nd place, silver medalist(s)	United Kingdom	Jennifer Meadows; Danielle Halsall; Kim Wall; Helen Karagounis	3:30.44	
3rd place, bronze medalist(s)	Germany	Eileen Müller; Katharina Gröb; Tina Kron; Claudia Hoffmann	3:33.59	
4	Ukraine	Hanna Bordyugova; Tetyana Petlyuk; Anastasiya Rabchenyuk; Nataliya Pyhyda	3:33.63	
5	Poland	Anna Nentwig; Karolina Tłustochowska; Anita Hennig; Monika Bejnar	3:34.04	

== Participation ==
According to an unofficial count, 20 athletes from 5 countries participated in the event.

- Germany (4)
- Poland (4)
- Russia (4)
- Ukraine (4)
- United Kingdom (4)
