= Monika Bejnar =

Polish sprinter (born 1981)

Medal record

Women's Athletics

Representing Poland

European Championships
Bronze medal – third place	2006 Gothenburg	4 x 400m

European Indoor Championships
Silver medal – second place	2005 Madrid	4 x 400 m

Monika Bejnar (born 10 March 1981, Tarnów) is a Polish retired sprint athlete.

She finished 4th in the 200m final at the 2006 European Athletics Championships in Gothenburg.

She also competed in the 4 × 400 m relay team for Poland in the 2004 Olympics.

== Competition record ==
Year	Competition	Venue	Position	Event	Notes
Representing Poland
2000	World Junior Championships	Santiago, Chile	4th	4 × 400 m relay	3:36.11
2001	European U23 Championships	Amsterdam, Netherlands	2nd	4 × 400 m relay	3:32.38
2003	European U23 Championships	Bydgoszcz, Poland	4th	400m	52.35
2003	European U23 Championships	Bydgoszcz, Poland	5th	4 × 400 m relay	3:34.04
2003	World Championships	Paris, France	5th	4 × 400 m relay	3:26.64
2004	World Indoor Championships	Budapest, Hungary	4th	4 × 400 m relay	3:30.52
2004	Olympic Games	Athens, Greece	5th	4 × 400 m relay	3:25.22
2005	European Indoor Championships	Madrid, Spain	6th	400 m	52.63
2005	European Indoor Championships	Madrid, Spain	2nd	4 × 400 m relay	3:29.37
2005	World Championships	Helsinki, Finland	4th	4 × 400 m relay	3:24.49
2005	Universiade	İzmir, Turkey	5th	200 m	23.75
2005	Universiade	İzmir, Turkey	2nd	4 × 400 m relay	3:27.71
2006	World Indoor Championships	Moscow, Russia	11th (sf)	400 m	52.60
2006	World Indoor Championships	Moscow, Russia	4th	4 × 400 m relay	3:28.95
2006	European Championships	Gothenburg, Sweden	4th	200 m	23.28
2006	European Championships	Gothenburg, Sweden	3rd	4 × 400 m relay	3:27.77
2008	Olympic Games	Beijing, China	31st (h)	400 m	52.80
2008	Olympic Games	Beijing, China	11th (h)	4 × 400 m relay	3:28.23

== See also ==
- Polish records in athletics
