= Alison Rodger =

Scottish chemist

Professor Alison Rodger FRSC FRACI FAA
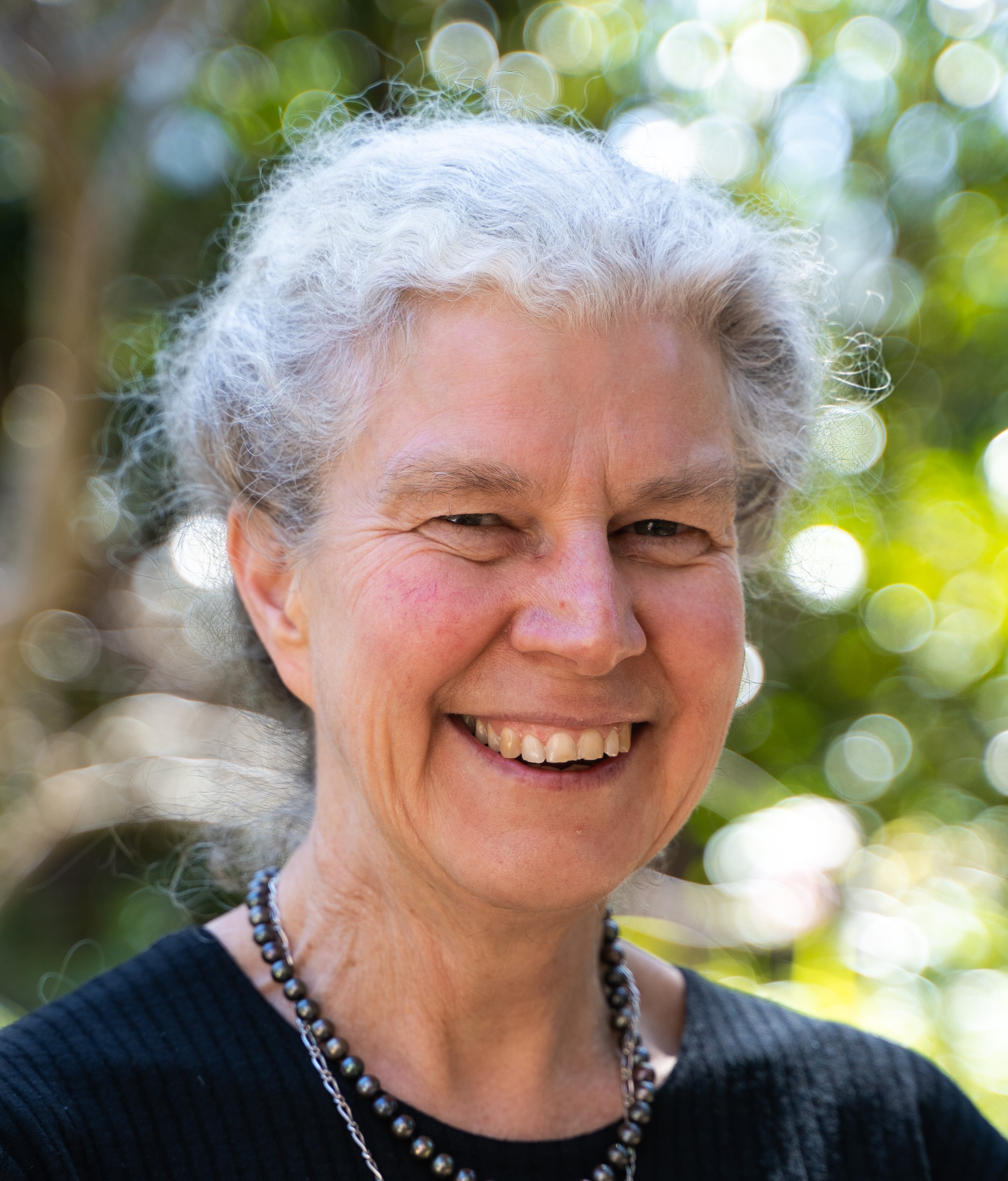
- Education: University of Sydney; Moore Theological College; University of Oxford; University of Chester
- Known for: Biomacromolecules
- Scientific career
- Workplaces: Australian National University; Macquarie University; University of Warwick; University of Oxford; University of Cambridge

Alison Rodger (born November 21, 1959) is a Scottish-Australian chemist who is a professor of chemistry at the Australian National University. Her research considers biomacromolecular structures and their characterisation. She is currently developing fluorescence detected liner dichroism, Raman Linear Difference Spectroscopy and attenuated total reflectance Vibrational linear dichroism to understand biomacromolecular structure and interactions with application to the division of bacterial cells.

== Early life and education ==
Rodger was born in Edinburgh to John and Margaret McDougall. She earned her bachelor's, PhD and DSc from University of Sydney. She was awarded the University of Sydney University Medal for theoretical chemistry. Whilst a student, Roger developed Classical Selection Rule (CSR), a procedure that can be used to analyse reaction mechanisms. In 1985 she completed a diploma in Biblical Studies at Moore Theological College. She gained a master's degree at the University of Oxford in 1988. She moved to the University of Warwick for a second DSc, and earned a bachelor's degree in theology at the University of Chester. Rodger was appointed a Beatrice Dale Fellowship at Newnham College, Cambridge from 1985 to 1988.

== Research and career ==
In 1985 Rodger joined Newnham College Cambridge as a Beatrice Dale Research fellow. 1988 Rodger she moved to the University of Oxford as a Unilever Fellow in St Catherine's College. She moved to St Hilda's College in 1991. She developed the UK's first Couette flow linear dichroism facilities. In 1994 Rodger joined the University of Warwick as a Lecturer. She was made a Senior Lecturer in 1998, a Reader in 2003 and a professor in 2005. Rodger was Head of the Department of Chemistry at the University of Warwick from 2014 to 2016. She was the only woman academic in the Physical Chemistry Laboratory at Oxford and the Department of Chemistry at the University of Warwick for over 11 years. She has been involved with several initiatives to improve gender balance in academic chemistry, including Athena SWAN and a European partnership, PLOTINA (Promoting Gender Balance and Inclusion in Research, Innovation and Training). PLOTINA looked to drive cultural change by developing diverse, inclusive work environments. Under Rodger's leadership, Warwick was the fourth institution to achieve silver Athena SWAN status. She was the founder and Director of the Doctoral Training Centre in Molecular Organisation and Assembly in Cells. The Doctoral Training Centre was one of the first EPSRC-funded DTCs. She developed a postgraduate certificate in transferable skills to support early career researchers. She moved to Macquarie University in 2017, where she established an open-access biophysical spectroscopy facility for collaborators. In 2024, she joined the Australian National University. as Director of the Research School of Chemistry.

Rodger is interested in how the structure and arrangement of biomolecules impact their function. She developed the technology for UV- Linear Dichroism spectroscopy. Her lab became the national and international hub of Couette flow Linear Dichroism, allowing scientists to obtain structural and kinetic information about several systems. She demonstrated that it is possible to orient membrane systems of liposomes. Rodgers developed Raman Linear Difference Spectroscopy to study the division of bacterial cells. She designed a new instrument that could measure Raman optical activity and Raman Linear Difference Spectroscopy in an effort to probe the secondary and tertiary structures of biomacromolecules. Her research in the UK was supported by the Engineering and Physical Sciences Research Council, Biotechnology and Biological Sciences Research Council. Rodger serves on the advisory board of the Protein Circular Dichroism Data Bank. In 2015 she was named on the Analytical Science Power List. She joined the council at St John's College, Nottingham in 2015. Rodger completed a bachelor's degree in Theology at St John's College whilst working as a professor of Biophysical Chemistry. She serves on the Australian Research Council Science and Technology Advisory Panel.

Alongside investigating circular dichroism of biomacromolecules, Rodger has studied molecular electronic systems. She co-led the UK Circular and Linear Dichroism Summer School for over 10 years. She was a member of the Royal Society of Chemistry Council until she left the UK in 2017. She was very involved in Athena SWAN in the UK and was part of the Athena SWAN expansion in Australia, SAGE. She is a member of Barker College Council and an Honorary Member of the British Biophysical Society.

In 2021 she received the accolade of election as Fellow of the Australian Academy of Science.

== Awards ==
Rodger was awarded the David Craig Medal and Lecture in 2025.

=== Books ===
- 2017 Circular Dichroism and Linear Dichroism
- 2014 Molecular Geometry
- 2010 Linear Dichroism and Circular Dichroism: A Textbook on Polarized-light Spectroscopy
