= Olha Zavhorodnya =

Ukrainian sprinter

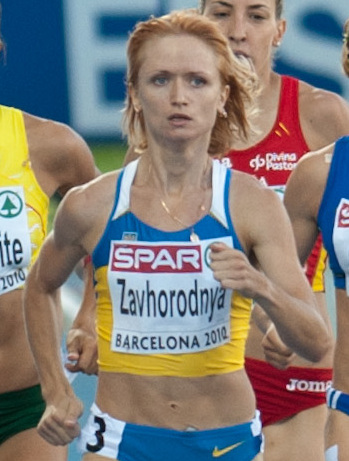
Medal record
Women's athletics
Summer Universiade
Gold medal – first place	2007 Bangkok	4x400 m relay
Gold medal – first place	2011 Shenzhen	800 m
Bronze medal – third place	2005 İzmir	4x400 m relay

Olha Zavhorodnya (born 6 January 1983) is a Ukrainian athlete who specializes in the 400 metres and 800 metres. She is the most famous athlete to come from the small industrial town of Pryluky.

She finished eighth in the 400 metres at the 2005 Summer Universiade, and also won a bronze medal in the 4 x 400 metres relay. At the 2007 Summer Universiade she won a gold medal in the 4 x 400 metres relay. She also competed at the 2007 World Championships, and was on the 2007 European Indoor Championships team that was disqualified.

Her personal best times are 52.13 seconds in the 400 metres, achieved in July 2007 in Donetsk; and 1:59.56 minutes in the 800 metres, achieved in August 2011 in Shenzhen, China.

She retired in August 2016 with an achilles injury that dashed her hopes at making the 2016 Olympic Team. Upon retirement, she received a scholarship to study the Korean language with the ISR Sports Academy. After the end of the program, she enrolled in Korean language classes at Pukyong National University and now lives in Busan. She works as a coach in both Ukraine and Korea.
