= Athletics at the 2005 Summer Universiade =

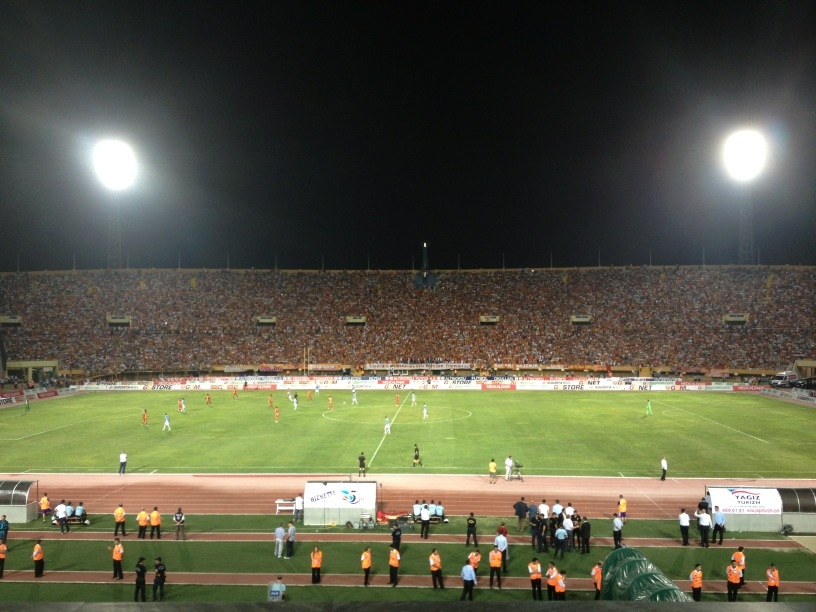
- Host stadium in İzmir
- Dates: 15–20 August
- Host city: İzmir, Turkey
- Venue: İzmir Atatürk Stadyumu
- Level: Senior
- Events: 46

The athletics competition at the 2005 Summer Universiade was held on the İzmir Atatürk Stadyumu in İzmir, Turkey, between 15 August and 20 August 2005.

== Medal summary ==
=== Men's events ===
Event	Gold		Silver		Bronze	
100 metres	Hu Kai; China	10.30	Andrey Yepishin; Russia	10.43	Sandro Viana; Brazil	10.49
200 metres	Leigh Julius; South Africa	20.56	Shinji Takahira; Japan	20.93	Paul Hession; Ireland	21.02
400 metres	Marvin Essor; Jamaica	45.99	DeWayne Barrett; Jamaica	46.14	Yuki Yamaguchi; Japan	46.15
800 metres	Fabiano Peçanha; Brazil	1:46.01	Selahattin Çobanoğlu; Turkey	1:47.49	Maksim Adamovich; Russia	1:47.50
1500 metres	Ivan Heshko; Ukraine	3:49.49	Andrew Baddeley; Great Britain	3:50.90	Vincent Rono; Kenya	3:51.48
5000 metres	Wilson Busienei; Uganda	13:38.81	Reid Coolsaet; Canada	13:39.90	Simon Ndirangu; Kenya	13:43.47
10,000 metres	Wilson Busienei; Uganda	28:27.57	Mohamed Fadil; Morocco	28:31.86	Karim El Mabchour; Morocco	28:43.15
Half marathon	Wilson Busienei; Uganda	1:03:47	Takayuki Tagami; Japan	1:03:48	Mohamed Fadil; Morocco	1:03:52
3000 metre steeplechase	Halil Akkaş; Turkey	8:30.16	Ion Luchianov; Moldova	8:30.66	Ruben Ramolefi; South Africa	8:31.53
110 metres hurdles	Mateus Inocêncio; Brazil	13.45	Jared MacLeod; Canada	13.67	Sergey Demidyuk; Ukraine	13.69
400 metres hurdles	Kenji Narisako; Japan	48.96	Takayuki Koike; Japan	49.75	Greg Little; Jamaica	49.77
4 × 100 metres relay	Italy; Luca Verdecchia, Alessandro Rocco, Massimiliano Donati, Stefano Anceschi	39.25	Japan; Kazuya Kitamura, Masaya Aikawa, Masaya Minami, Shinji Takahira	39.29	Great Britain; Gavin Eastman, Tyrone Edgar, Darren Chin, Timothy Abeyie	39.41
4 × 400 metres relay	Poland; Rafał Wieruszewski, Daniel Dąbrowski, Piotr Kędzia, Piotr Klimczak	3:02.57	Japan; Kazunori Ota, Yoshihiro Horigome, Yuki Yamaguchi, Kenji Narisako	3:03.20	Russia; Dimitry Petrov, Alexander Borshchenko, Konstantin Svechkar, Vladislav Frolov	3:03.33
20 kilometre road walk	Juan Manuel Molina; Spain	1:24:06	Kim Hyun-Sup; South Korea	1:24:42	Koichiro Morioka; Japan	1:25:18
High jump	Aleksander Waleriańczyk; Poland	2.30	Gennadiy Moroz; Belarus	2.26	Martyn Bernard; Great Britain	2.23
Pole vault	Björn Otto; Germany	5.80 =CR	Konstadinos Filippidis; Greece	5.75	Aleksandr Korchmyd; Ukraine	5.70
Long jump	Vladimir Zyuskov; Ukraine	8.06	Issam Nima; Algeria	8.02	Stefano Dacastello; Italy	7.95
Triple jump	Aleksandr Sergeyev; Russia	16.72	Steven Shalders; Great Britain	16.67	Nikolay Savolaynen; Ukraine	16.67
Shot put	Tomasz Majewski; Poland	20.60	Taavi Peetre; Estonia	20.02	Anton Lyuboslavskiy; Russia	19.40
Discus throw	Gerd Kanter; Estonia	65.29	Omar Ahmed El Ghazaly; Egypt	62.28	Gábor Máté; Hungary	61.91
Hammer throw	Vadim Devyatovskiy; Belarus	79.13	Eşref Apak; Turkey	76.18	Valeriy Sviatokha; Belarus	74.71
Javelin throw	Ainārs Kovals; Latvia	80.67	Tero Järvenpää; Finland	79.61	Stefan Müller; Switzerland	78.56
Decathlon	Aleksandr Parkhomenko; Belarus	8051	François Gourmet; Belgium	7792	Nadir El Fassi; France	7724

=== Women's events ===
Event	Gold		Silver		Bronze	
100 metres	Olga Khalandyreva; Russia	11.43	Ailis McSweeney; Ireland	11.68	Nikolett Listár; Hungary	11.71
200 metres	Natalya Ivanova; Russia	23.28	Yelena Yakovleva; Russia	23.45	Élodie Ouédraogo; Belgium	23.62
400 metres	Natalya Nazarova; Russia	51.31	Fatou Bintou Fall; Senegal	51.33	Tatyana Roslanova; Kazakhstan	52.46
800 metres	Svetlana Klyuka; Russia	2:00.80	Binnaz Uslu; Turkey	2:01.42	Marilyn Okoro; Great Britain	2:01.90
1500 metres	Olesya Syreva; Russia	4:12.69	Tatyana Holovchenko; Ukraine	4:12.73	Liu Qing; China	4:12.76
5000 metres	Kim Smith; New Zealand	15:29.18	Tatyana Holovchenko; Ukraine	15:44.92	Jolene Byrne; Ireland	15:56.01
10,000 metres	Eri Sato; Japan	34:12.06	Zeng Guang; China	34:57.57	Mary Davies; New Zealand	35:58.20
Half marathon	Lee Eun-Jung; South Korea	1:14:31	Ryoko Kizaki; Japan	1:14:34	Jang Son-Ok; North Korea	1:14:50
3000 metre steeplechase	Lívia Tóth; Hungary	9:40.37 CR	Victoria Mitchell; Australia	9:47.54	Türkan Erişmiş; Turkey	9:50.32
100 metres hurdles	Mirjam Liimask; Estonia	12.96	Tatyana Pavliy; Russia	13.01	Derval O'Rourke; Ireland	13.02
400 metres hurdles	Marina Shiyan; Russia	55.14	Benedetta Ceccarelli; Italy	55.22	Marta Chrust; Poland	55.49
4 × 100 metres relay	Russia; Evgeniya Polyakova, Olga Khalandyreva, Elena Yakovleva, Yuliya Chermoshanskaya	43.62	France; Natacha Vouaux, Aurore Kassambara, Celine Thelamon, Adrianna Lamalle	43.73	Ireland; Derval O'Rourke, Anna Boyle, Emily Maher, Ailis McSweeney	44.69
4 × 400 metres relay	Russia; Anastasia Ovchinnikova, Natalia Ivanova, Yelena Migunova, Natalya Nazarova	3:27.47	Poland; Monika Bejnar, Ewelina Sętowska, Marta Chrust, Grażyna Prokopek	3:27.71	Ukraine; Antonina Yefremova, Olga Zangorodnya, Nataliya Pygyda, Liliya Pilyugina	3:28.23
20 km walk	Jiang Qiuyan; China	1:33:13 CR	Vera Santos; Portugal	1:33.54	Tatyana Sibileva; Russia	1:34.16
High jump	Anna Chicherova; Russia	1.90	Iryna Kovalenko; Ukraine	1.88	Ariane Friedrich; Germany	1.88
Pole vault	Julia Hütter; Germany	4.25	Nadine Rohr; Switzerland	4.20	Dimitra Emmanouil; Greece	4.20
Long jump	Lyudmila Kolchanova; Russia	6.79	Naide Gomes; Portugal	6.56	Natalya Lebusova; Russia	6.51
Triple jump	Wang Ying; China	14.12	Olha Saladukha; Ukraine	13.96	Nadezhda Bazenova; Russia	13.90
Shot put	Natalya Khoroneko; Belarus	18.86	Li Meiju; China	18.48	Misleydis González; Cuba	18.26
Discus throw	Wioletta Potępa; Poland	62.10	Song Aimin; China	61.74	Dragana Tomaševic; Serbia and Montenegro	59.92
Hammer throw	Kamila Skolimowska; Poland	72.75	Liu Yinghui; China	72.51	Ester Balassini; Italy	70.13
Javelin throw	Barbora Špotáková; Czech Republic	60.73	Ma Ning; China	59.18	Justine Robbeson; South Africa	58.70
Heptathlon	Lyudmila Blonska; Ukraine	6297	Simone Oberer; Switzerland	5996	Jessica Ennis; Great Britain	5910

== Medal table ==
Rank	Nation	Gold	Silver	Bronze	Total
1	Russia (RUS)	11	3	6	20
2	Poland (POL)	5	1	1	7
3	China (CHN)	3	5	1	9
4	Ukraine (UKR)	3	4	4	11
5	Belarus (BLR)	3	1	1	5
6	Uganda (UGA)	3	0	0	3
7	Japan (JPN)	2	5	2	9
8	Estonia (EST)	2	1	0	3
9	Brazil (BRA)	2	0	1	3
9	Germany (GER)	2	0	1	3
11	Turkey (TUR)	1	3	1	5
12	Italy (ITA)	1	1	2	4
13	Jamaica (JAM)	1	1	1	3
14	South Korea (KOR)	1	1	0	2
15	Hungary (HUN)	1	0	2	3
16	New Zealand (NZL)	1	0	1	2
16	South Africa (RSA)	1	0	1	2
18	Czech Republic (CZE)	1	0	0	1
18	Latvia (LAT)	1	0	0	1
18	Spain (ESP)	1	0	0	1
21	Great Britain (GBR)	0	2	4	6
22	Switzerland (SUI)	0	2	1	3
23	Canada (CAN)	0	2	0	2
23	Portugal (POR)	0	2	0	2
25	Ireland (IRL)	0	1	4	5
26	Morocco (MAR)	0	1	3	4
27	Belgium (BEL)	0	1	1	2
27	France (FRA)	0	1	1	2
27	Greece (GRE)	0	1	1	2
27	North Korea (PRK)	0	1	1	2
31	Algeria (ALG)	0	1	0	1
31	Australia (AUS)	0	1	0	1
31	Egypt (EGY)	0	1	0	1
31	Finland (FIN)	0	1	0	1
31	Moldova (MDA)	0	1	0	1
31	Senegal (SEN)	0	1	0	1
37	Kenya (KEN)	0	0	2	2
38	Cuba (CUB)	0	0	1	1
38	Kazakhstan (KAZ)	0	0	1	1
38	Serbia and Montenegro (SCG)	0	0	1	1
Totals (40 entries)		46	46	46	138

== See also ==
- 2005 in the sport of athletics
- FISU World University Games
- University and college sport
