= Mervyn Luckwell =

British javelin thrower

Personal information
- Nationality: British (English)
- Born: 29 November 1984 (age 41) Milton Keynes, England
- Height: 1.91 m (6 ft 3 in)
- Weight: 104 kg (229 lb)

Sport
- Sport: Track and field
- Event: Javelin

Achievements and titles
- Personal best: Javelin throw: 83.52 m (2011)

Mervyn Richard Luckwell (born 29 November 1984) is a British javelin thrower. He was the sole male javelin thrower on the team for Great Britain at the 2012 Summer Olympics.

== Biography ==
He was born in Milton Keynes. Luckwell represented Great Britain at the European Team Championships in 2009 and 2010, and also the 2009 World Championships in Athletics.

Luckwell became the British javelin throw champion after winning the 2009 British Athletics Championships.

== Seasonal bests by year ==
- 2007 - 75.68
- 2008 - 74.98
- 2009 - 81.05
- 2010 - 80.08
- 2011 - 83.52
- 2012 - 82.15
