= Natalya Ivanova (hurdler) =

Russian hurdler (born 1981)

Natalya Nikolaevna Ivanova (Russian: Наталья Николаевна Иванова, born 25 June 1981) is a Russian hurdler. She finished fifth in the 400 m hurdles final at the 2006 European Athletics Championships in Gothenburg.

She also ran in the heats for Russia's 4 × 400 m relay team in the 2004 Olympics. This entitled her to a silver medal, despite not competing in the final where Russia finished second.

== Achievements ==
Year	Competition	Venue	Position	Event	Notes
Representing Russia
2000	World Junior Championships	Santiago, Chile	5th	400 m	53.58
2002	European Indoor Championships	Vienna, Austria	4th	400 m	52.23
2003	European U23 Championships	Bydgoszcz, Poland	5th	400 m	52.54
2003	European U23 Championships	Bydgoszcz, Poland	1st	4 × 400 m relay	3:29.55
2004	Olympic Games	Athens, Greece	2nd	4 × 400 m relay	3:23.52
2005	Universiade	İzmir, Turkey	1st	200 m	23.28
2006	European Championships	Gothenburg, Sweden	5th	400 m hurdles	55.04
2006	European Championships	Gothenburg, Sweden	1st	4 × 400 m relay	3:25.12
2007	European Indoor Championships	Birmingham, England	2nd	4 × 400 m relay	3:28.16
2010	European Championships	Barcelona, Spain	7th	400 m hurdles	55.51

=== Personal bests ===
- 200 metres – 22.97 s (2005)
- 400 metres – 50.79 s (2004)
- 400 metres hurdles – 54.36 s (2007)
