= Jana Neubert =

German sprinter

Personal information
- Nationality: German
- Born: 30 August 1984 (age 41) Karl-Marx-Stadt, East Germany

Sport
- Sport: Sprinting
- Event: 4 × 400 metres relay

Jana Neubert (born 30 August 1984) is a German sprinter. She competed in the women's 4 × 400 metres relay at the 2004 Summer Olympics.
