= Scott Overall =

British athlete

The Honourable, C.D. Scott Overall
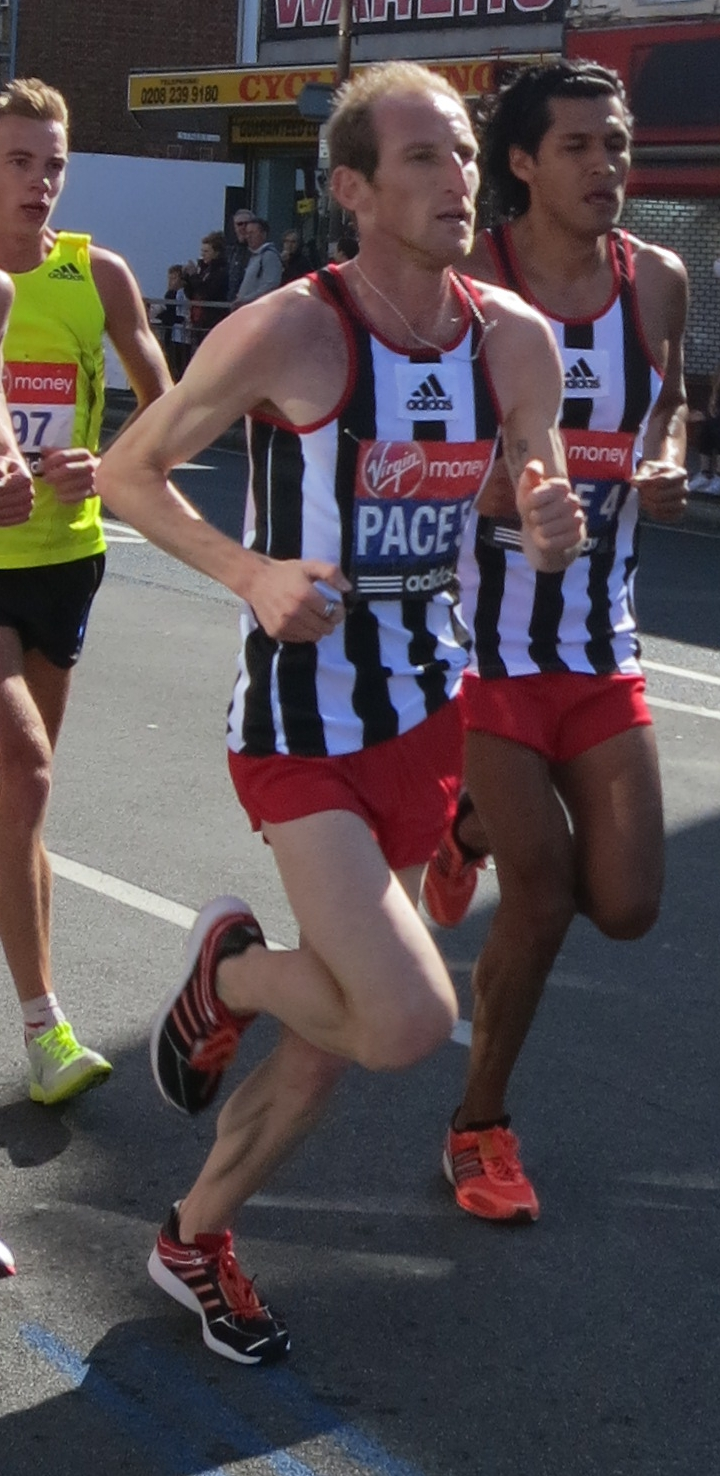
- Scott in the London marathon 2012

Personal information
- Nationality: British (English)
- Born: 9 February 1983 (age 43)
- Height: 181 cm (5 ft 11 in)
- Weight: 62 kg (137 lb)

Sport
- Sport: Track and field
- Events: Middle, Long Distance
- College team: Butler University
- Club: Blackheath and Bromley Harriers AC

Achievements and titles
- Personal bests: 1500 m: 3:41 (Hillsdale, Michigan 2008) 1 mile (Indoor): 3:58.61 (Bloomington, Indiana 2010); 3000 m: 7:48 (London 2008) 5000 m: 13:28 (Walnut, CA 2008); 10 mile: 47:37 (Portsmouth 2010); Half Marathon: 61:25 (New York City 2012) Marathon: 2:10.55 (Berlin 2011)

Scott Ashley Overall (born 9 February 1983) is a British athlete who runs for the Blackheath & Bromley. Scott was officially named part of the 2012 GB Olympic team on 5 December 2011 after achieving "A-Standard" at the Berlin marathon. He finished 61st in the London Olympic Marathon of 2012 in a time of 2:22:37

== Biography ==
Overall attended Archdeacon Cambridge's Church of England Primary School until 1994 then Orleans Park Secondary School in Twickenham until 1999. Overall then attended Butler University in Indiana, United States, from 2004-2007. He was also an usher at Mo Farah's wedding.

Overall became the British 5000 metres champion after winning the 2009 British Athletics Championships.

== International competitions ==
Year	Competition	Venue	Position	Event	Notes
2005	European U23 Championships	Erfurt, Germany	6th	5000m	14:17.16
2012	Olympic Games	London, England	61st	Marathon	
2014	Reading Half Marathon	Reading, United Kingdom	1st	Half marathon	1:04:44
2015	London Marathon	United Kingdom	13th	Marathon	2:13:13
2015	Peachtree Road Race	United States	1st	10 km	29:30
2019	Reading Half Marathon	Reading, United Kingdom	1st	Half marathon	1:03:50
