= Emma Lyons =

English pole vaulter

Emma Lyons (born 14 June 1987) is an English female athlete who competes in the pole vault. She has a personal best performance of 4.31 metres.

== Athletics career ==
Lyons competed for England at the 2010 Commonwealth Games in Delhi, India finishing 7th. The previous year, she placed 12th in the 2009 European Athletics Under 23 Championships in Kaunas, Lithuania. Lyons also won a gold medal at the 2008 British Championships which also served as the Olympic Trials in the same year.
