= Robert Mitchell (high jumper) =

Robert Mitchell (born 14 September 1980) is a Welsh athlete competing in high jump.

He finished seventh at the 2006 Commonwealth Games in Melbourne with a jump of 2.15 metres.

== Personal bests ==
His personal best outdoor jump is 2.25 metres, achieved in July 2001 in Bedford.
His personal best indoor jump is 2.24 metres, achieved in January 2009 in Cardiff.
