= Paul Walker (pole vaulter) =

Welsh male athlete

Personal information
- Nationality: British (Welsh)
- Born: 15 August 1985 (age 41)

Sport
- Sport: Athletics
- Event: Pole vault
- Club: Sale Harriers; Loughborough Students

Paul Walker (born 15 August 1985) is a former athlete from Wales who competed in the pole vault event. He has a personal best performance of 5.45 metres.

== Biography ==
Walker competed for Wales at the 2010 Commonwealth Games in Delhi, India finishing 5th and the 2014 Commonwealth Games in Glasgow, Scotland again finishing 5th.

He is also the Welsh Indoor record holder which stands at 5.45 metres.

Walker was on the podium three-times at the British nationals; at the AAA Championships title in 2006 and the British Athletics Championships in 2009 and 2014.
