= Louise Butterworth =

English pole vaulter

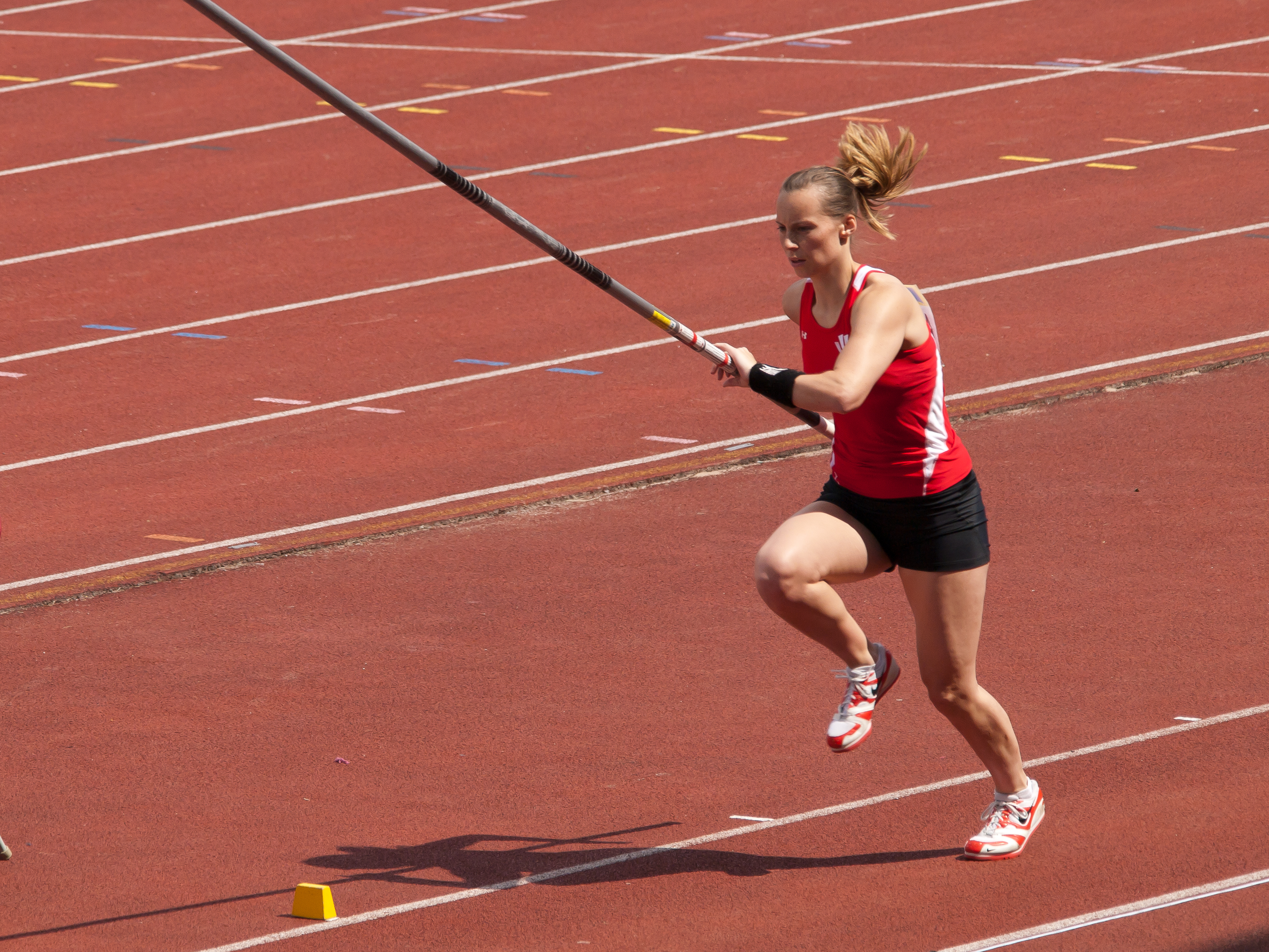
Louise Butterworth competing at the 2010 UK Athletics Championships and European Trials

Louise Butterworth (born 22 February 1985) is an English pole vaulter from Paignton, Devon. She currently competes for Birchfield Harriers and has represented Great Britain.

Her personal best jump is 4.21 metres, achieved in June 2008 in Poland.

Butterworth attended Churston Grammar School, before studying at UWIC. She made her Great Britain debut in the SPAR European Cup in France.

In March 2009 she was chosen as the first member of a new funding initiative in Torbay, Devon, with the aim of helping a local talent reach the 2012 Olympics.
