= Tyrone Edgar =

British sprinter (born 1982)

Personal information
- Full name: Tyrone Damien Edgar
- Nationality: British (English)
- Born: 29 March 1982 (age 44) Greenwich, England
- Height: 183 cm (6 ft 0 in)
- Weight: 84 kg (185 lb)

Sport
- Sport: Athletics
- Event: Sprints
- Club: Newham and Essex Beagles
Medal record
Men's Athletics
Representing Great Britain
World Championships
Bronze medal – third place	2009 Berlin	4 × 100 m relay

Tyrone Damien Edgar (born 29 March 1982) is a former sprinter from Great Britain who specialised in the 100 metres. He competed at the 2008 Summer Olympics.

== Biography ==
Edgar went to junior college at Kansas City Community College in 2003 where he ran an impressive wind assisted (+5.2) 10.04 at the Junior College Championships. He moved to Texas A&M University in the autumn of 2004 and had a breakthrough in 2006 with another wind assisted 10.05 in the NCAA Midwest Championships - Later that summer he earned a place in the Norwich Union GB and NI European Championships Team. Edgar has a degree in leadership and development from Texas A&M and is a qualified fitness instructor.

He competed at the 2004 World Indoor Championships and the 2006 European Championships without reaching the final. In the 4 × 100 metres relay he won a gold medal at the 2000 World Junior Championships and a silver medal at the 2005 Summer Universiade.

2008 was his most successful year to date. He improved his personal best to 10.06 and, after the controversial disqualification of Dwain Chambers, was selected to compete for Great Britain in the 2008 Summer Olympics. Edgar progressed further than the other two British runners and was eliminated at the semi-final stage after finishing seventh in a time of 10.18 seconds. Following an interview after the race Edgar stated that he felt he belonged in the company of the top sprinters and was now looking to the 2009 World Championships in Berlin. Together with Simeon Williamson, Marlon Devonish and Craig Pickering he also competed at the 4 × 100 metres relay. In their qualification heat they were disqualified and eliminated.

Edgar suffered a torn hamstring at the Birmingham Games in February 2009, and as a result he missed the Indoor Championships in Turin.

On 22 August 2009, Edgar was a member of The Great Britain and Northern Ireland men's 4 × 100 m relay team that took bronze at the IAAF World Championships in Berlin with a season's best of 38.02. Harry Aikines-Aryeetey, Simeon Williamson and Marlon Devonish ran the other legs.

== Personal bests ==
Event	Time (seconds)	Location	Date
60 metres	6.60 sec	Fayetteville, Arkansas, United States	13 February 2004
100 metres	10.06 sec	Geneva, Switzerland	31 May 2008
200 metres	20.96 sec	Mannheim, Germany	16 June 2001
200 metres (indoor)	21.29	Lincoln, Nebraska, United States	7 February 2004

- All information taken from IAAF profile.
