= Liliya Lobanova =

Ukrainian athlete

Personal information
- Born: October 14, 1985 (age 40) Voroshilovgrad, Ukrainian SSR, Soviet Union
- Education: Luhansk State University of Internal Affairs
- Height: 168 cm (5 ft 6 in)
- Weight: 56 kg (123 lb)
- Spouse: Oleg Lobanova

Sport
- Country: Ukraine
- Event(s): 400m, 800m
Medal record
Women's athletics
Representing Ukraine
European Team Championships
Silver medal – second place	2011 Stockholm	800 m

Liliya Lobanova, née Pilyuhina (born 14 October 1985) is a Ukrainian athlete who specializes in the 400 metres and 800 metres.

She was born in Luhansk. She finished eighth in the 400 metres at the 2004 World Junior Championships, fourth in the 4 x 400 metres relay at the 2005 European Indoor Championships, and fifth in the relay at the 2005 World Championships. At the 2005 Summer Universiade she won a bronze medal in the relay.

Her personal best times are 51.85 seconds in the 400 metres, achieved in June 2005 in Minsk; and 2:01.33 minutes in the 800 metres, achieved in June 2009 in Yalta.
