= Jonathan Moore (long jumper) =

English long jumper (born 1984)

Personal information
- Nationality: British (English)
- Born: 31 May 1984 (age 42) Birmingham, England
- Height: 1.80 m (5 ft 11 in)
- Weight: 74 kg (11.7 st)

Sport
- Sport: Athletics
- Events: Triple jump, long jump
- Club: Birchfield Harriers

Jonathan Moore (born 31 May 1984) is an English former athlete who specialised in the triple jump and long jump events. Competing in the triple jump event in 2001, he won gold at the World Youth Championships and silver at the European Junior Championships. A former holder of the British Junior long jump record, he is the son of Commonwealth Games triple jump medallist Aston Moore.

== Athletics career ==
Born in Sutton Coldfield, Birmingham, Jonathan Moore began practising triple jump at the age of thirteen. His first medal came at the English Schools' event in 1999 and he won gold at the same event in 2000. In 2000 he also won the U17 Championships in both events and the Schools' International and Commonwealth Youth Games in the triple jump. That year he became the first under 17-year-old to clear 16 metres in the triple jump.

In 2001 Moore won the English Schools' title and AAA U20 gold in long jump. He grabbed gold in the triple jump at the World Youth Championships with a jump of 16.36 metres (53.7 ft) and silver at the 2001 European Junior Championships with 16.43 metres (53.9 ft).

He equalled the British Junior long jump record with 7.98 metres (26.2 ft) in an international match against France and made his first 8.00 metres (26.25 ft) jump in 2002 when he made the British Junior Record at 8.03 metres (26.3 ft) in Loughborough. This made him the first British Junior to jump over eight metres. He retained his AAA U20 title but in 2002, during the first event of the season, Moore ruptured his patella. He made a swift recovery after keyhole surgery and much appreciated support from fellow athlete Jonathan Edwards. In just twelve months Moore was competing again and he returned to further competitive success – he picked up a silver medal in 2004 for AAA Indoor Long Jump – but disappointment was to follow.

Moore failed a drugs test at a meeting in Merksem, Belgium, where he had won the long jump with an effort of 7.82 metres (25.7 ft) in 2004. He narrowly escaped a drug ban after testing positive for cannabis and was instead handed a public warning after he claimed that the drug had entered his system passively. He has been warned he faces a two-year suspension if he tests positive for cannabis again.

In January 2009, Moore finished fourth in the long jump with 7.37 m at an athletics meeting in Potchefstroom, South Africa. However, this event was overshadowed in the media by a incident in which he was hurt after allegedly jumping naked off the roof of a house while participating in warm-weather training. Moore subsequently flew back home to the United Kingdom with his father and a UK Athletics doctor. He ceased to compete after the incident.

== Family life ==
Moore is part of a successful sporting family: he is the son of 1975 European Junior champion and current athletics coach Aston Moore. He is the nephew of sprinter Wendy Hoyte (formerly Clarke), who is married to Les Hoyte, also a leading sprinter and sprint coach at Arsenal Football Club (brother of Trevor Hoyte, 1978 Commonwealth 200m finalist). His cousins include former Arsenal players Justin and Gavin Hoyte, and athlete Chris Clarke – the 2007 400 metres World Youth Champion.

== Personal bests ==
Correct as of January 2009

Date	Event	Venue	Distance (metres)
18 May 2002	Long jump	Loughborough, England	8.03
22 July 2001	Triple jump	Grosseto, Italy	16.43

- All information taken from IAAF profile.
