= Leon Baptiste =

English sprinter (born 1985)

Personal information
- Nationality: British (English)
- Born: 23 May 1985 (age 41)

Sport
- Sport: Athletics
- Event: 200 metres
- Club: Enfield and Haringey AC

Achievements and titles
- Personal bests: 100 m: 10.26 s (Geneva 2008); 200 m: 20.45 s (Delhi 2010)
Medal record
Men's Athletics
Representing England
Commonwealth Games
Gold medal – first place	2010 Delhi	200 m
Gold medal – first place	2010 Delhi	4 × 100 m relay
Representing Great Britain
European Junior Championships
Gold medal – first place	2003 Tampere	100 m

Leon Sylvanus Baptiste (born 23 May 1985) is an English former sprinter who specialised in the 100 metres and 200 metres events. He became the 100 m European junior champion in 2004 and won his first major title six years later by taking the 200 m gold medal at the 2010 Commonwealth Games held in Delhi. He competed domestically for Enfield and Haringey Athletic Club and was coached by Michael Khmel at Loughborough University.

== Athletics career ==
=== Junior career ===
Baptiste chose athletics over football when a ligament injury whilst only 14 ruled him out of the sport. Speaking of the injury Baptiste said "My main passion was football, but I saw the talent I had in athletics. I was playing for a Sunday League team in the Enfield area and I tore ligaments in my knee during a game. I was 14 at the time...I carried on playing and made it worse. I still can't kick a football. Amazingly, the injury does not affect my running. When I kick a ball, my knee goes out of place, but when I run, it is fine." As a result of the injury Baptiste focused his attention on sprint running and he won the gold medal in the 100 metres at the European Junior Championships in Finland when only 18. He also anchored the 4 × 100 metres relay team to win his second gold of the competition. As a result, he was named junior male athlete of the year by the British Athletics Writers' Association. At the annual UK AAA Junior championships Baptiste won the 200 m title for three consecutive seasons (2002 to 2004) and the 100 m title twice (2003 and 2004).

In 2004 he improved his 100 m best to 10.33 sec with a run in Watford. Aiming to build upon his European junior title, he ran at the 2004 World Junior Championships. However, in the 100 m semi-finals he was eliminated after finishing third, beaten out of qualification by James Ellington.

=== Senior competition ===
His progress in the 100 metres stalled as he moved into the senior ranks and it was not until 2008, when he ran 10.26 sec in Geneva, that he improved upon his 2004 performance. He began to focus on running the 200 metres instead and finished sixth in the event final at the 2007 European Athletics U23 Championships. The next year he set a 200 m best of 20.76 sec to take third place in the British Olympic Trials. Baptiste won consecutive UK indoor titles over 200 m in 2009 and 2010, which included an indoor best of 20.90 sec to become the third fastest European that year.

=== 2010 Commonwealth Games ===
On 10 October 2010 Baptiste won the 200 m gold medal at the 2010 Commonwealth Games in New Delhi, ensuring England's first sprint gold at the games for 12 years since Julian Golding in 1998. In the final he ran 20.45 secs to overcome fellow British athletes Marlon Devonish and Christian Malcolm, as well as Jamaica's Lansford Spence who came in second. The win came on the back of disappointment for Baptiste as only earlier in the year he had failed to qualify for the 2010 European Championships, losing a run off for a place in the squad to Devonish. Speaking of his surprise at the turnaround in his fortunes at the Commonwealths, Baptiste said "If you had told me I would be Commonwealth champion at the start of the year I really would have doubted it so this win for me is just amazing." Later in the tournament he competed as part of the English 4 × 100 m relay team running the second leg. Running alongside Ryan Scott, Mark Lewis-Francis and Marlon Devonish, Baptiste picked up his second gold medal of the games as the relay team finished with a time of 38.75 sec pipping the Jamaicans.

=== Retirement ===
On 12 May 2014, Baptiste announced his retirement from competitive sport to concentrate on his coaching career.

In May 2026, Baptiste was reported missing whilst on holiday with friends in Morocco. In August that year, BBC Sport reported that Baptiste had been arrested in Morocco for the sexual assault of a minor and was sentenced to eight months in prison, reduced from an initial 10 months.
