= Yelena Migunova =

Russian sprinter

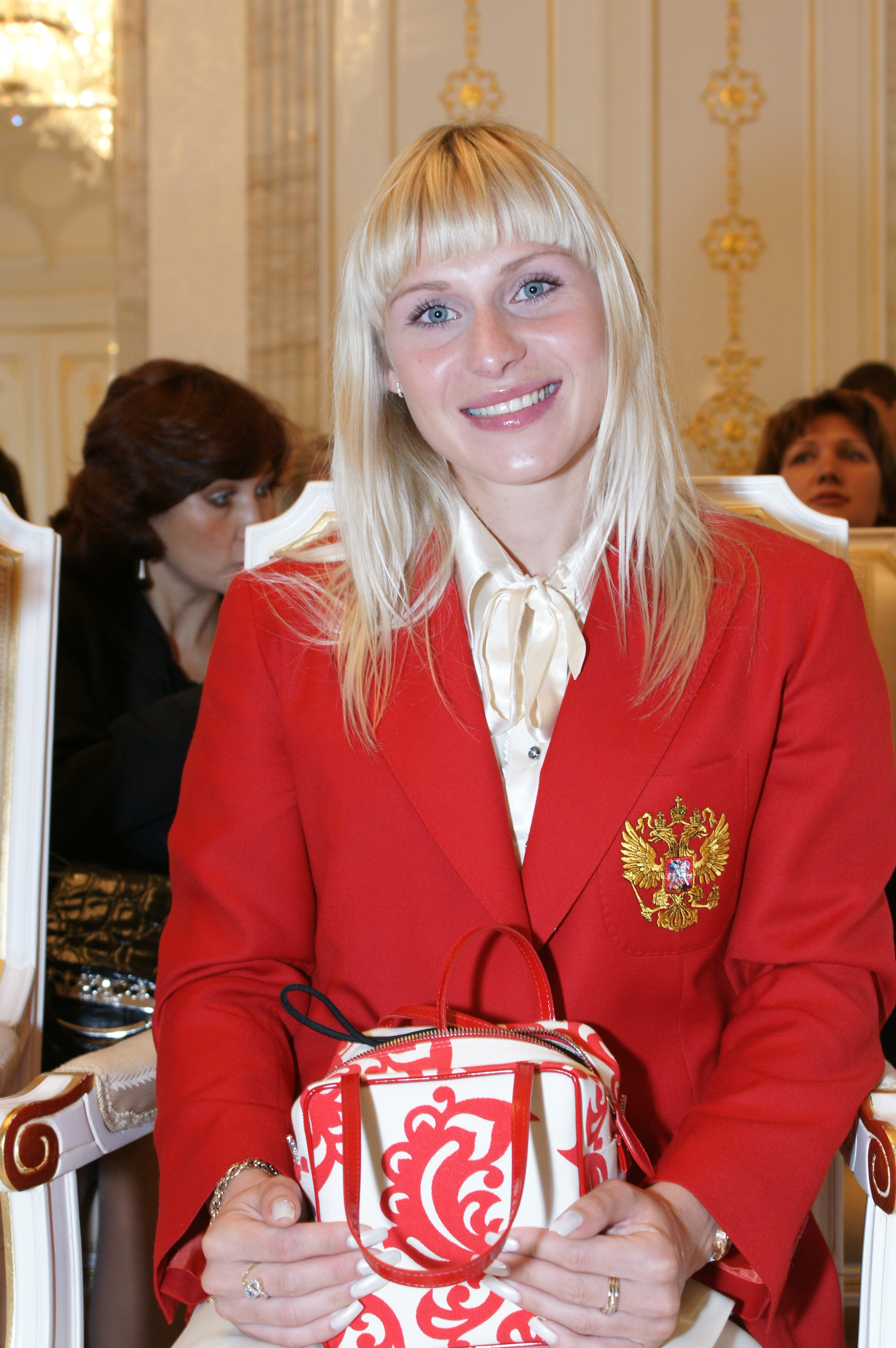

Medal record

Women's athletics

Representing Russia

Olympic Games
Disqualified	2008 Beijing	4 × 400 relay

European Indoor Championships
Gold medal – first place	2011 Paris	4 × 400 m relay

Universiade
Gold medal – first place	2011 Shenzhen	4 × 400 m relay
Silver medal – second place	2011 Shenzhen	400 m

Yelena Migunova (born 4 January 1984 in Kazan) is a Russian sprint athlete.

She won the silver medal in the 4 × 400 m relay at the 2008 Summer Olympics. Her teammates included Natalya Nazarova and Tatyana Levina
