= Vikki Hubbard =

English high jumper

Vikki Hubbard (born 13 July 1989) is an English high jumper.

She was born in Grantham and attended Cliffedale Primary School before being in the form Bronte at Kesteven and Grantham Girls' School. She was good at table tennis at school and was part of the school team.

She finished seventh at the 2005 World Youth Championships, and competed at the 2006 World Junior Championships and the 2010 World Indoor Championships without reaching the final.

Her personal best jump is 1.92 metres (indoor), achieved in February 2010 in Split.
