= Amy Woodman =

British long jumper

Amy Woodman (born 1 November 1984) is a British track and field athlete who competes in the long jump.

She was English National Long-jump champion in 2009 and 2010; English indoor long jump champion in 2009; and USA National Collegiate Champion (NCCA Division II) - Long jump in 2008.

== Early life ==
Amy was born in 1984 and lived in the village of Clutton, Somerset from the age of two years.

Woodman studied Sport and Exercise Science at the University of Wales Institute, Cardiff, before winning a two-year scholarship to Ferris State University at Big Rapids, Michigan, USA.

== Career ==
In March 2008 she represented Ferris State University, Michigan at the USA National Collegiate Championships (NCCA) which were held at Minnesota State University, Mankato. She won the US National Long jump championship by clearing 5.94 metres.

In February 2009, while training at Ferris State University, she visited the UK and won the Aviva UK National Long-jump championship at Sheffield with a distance of 6.40 metres.

Her personal best performances are 60 metres - 7.74 secs; 100 metres - 12 seconds; 200 metres - 24.86; high jump - 1.6 metres; long jump - 6.40 metres; triple jump - 11.04 metres.
