= Miriam Barnes =

American hurdler and sprinter (born 1983)

Personal information
- Born: November 14, 1983 (age 42)
- Education: Harrisburg High School; Barton Community College; Louisiana Tech University

Sport
- Country: United States
- Sport: Sport of athletics
- Events: 400 metres 400 metres hurdles
- College team: Barton Cougars; Louisiana Tech
- Club: Nike, Inc
- Coached by: Shawn Jackson

Achievements and titles
- National finals: 2007 NCAAs; • 4 × 400 m, 3rd (bronze); 2008 USA Champs; • 400 m hurdles, DQ; 2008 USA Indoors; • 400 m, 4th
- Personal bests: 400 mH: 55.35 (2008); 400 m: 52.61 (2008); 600 m: 1:29.34 sh (2009); 200 m: 24.11 (+1.3) (2008)
Medal record
Women's athletics
Representing the United States
World Indoor Championships
Bronze medal – third place	2008 Valencia	4 × 400 m relay
- Updated on November 2024

Miriam Barnes (born November 14, 1983) is an American former hurdler and sprinter specializing in the 400 metres and the 2008 World Athletics Indoor Championships bronze medalist in the 4 × 400 m relay. Before she turned professional with Nike, Inc., Barnes was an All American for the Louisiana Tech Lady Techsters track and field team in the relay. Barnes was in 3rd position and nearly became an Olympian at the 2008 United States Olympic trials, but she fell over the final hurdle and was disqualified.

== Career ==
As a prep at Harrisburg High School, Barnes finished 4th in the 400 m and 5th in the 300 m hurdles at the Pennsylvania Interscholastic Athletic Association state championships. She committed to Barton Community College, where she placed 4th in the 400 m at the 2005 NJCAA national championships.

Running for the Louisiana Tech Lady Techsters track and field team, Barnes took up the 400 metres hurdles. She had an unusual style, able to take off from either her left or right leg during races while other hurdlers favored one leg. In her first year of 400 m hurdling, she qualified for the 2006 NCAA Division I Outdoor Track and Field Championships in that event and the 4 × 400 m, failing to advance to the finals in both disciplines. She equaled her semi-finals placing in the 400 m hurdles at the 2007 NCAA Division I Outdoor Track and Field Championships, but at that meet she finished 3rd in the 4 × 400 m to earn her first All American status. Barnes continued her season after NCAAs, qualifying for the semi-finals of the 2007 USA Outdoor Track and Field Championships.

Barnes achieved her greatest international success during the 2008 indoor season, beginning with finishing 4th at the 2008 USA Indoor Track and Field Championships in the 400 m. As a member of the U.S. team at the 2008 World Indoor Championships 4 × 400 m, Barnes ran the 2nd leg alongside Angel Perkins, Shareese Woods, and Moushaumi Robinson, contributing to a bronze medal finish behind Russia and Belarus.

Outdoors, Barnes did not run at the NCAA Championships but was competitive in her first Olympic bid at the 2008 Olympic trials. Entered in the 400 m hurdles, Barnes won her heat and finished 2nd in her semi-final. With only 3 Olympic spots available, Barnes was in 3rd position coming into the last hurdle at the trials final and was expected to make the Olympic team before she fell trying to clear the hurdle, disqualifying her from the race.

Barnes ran at her last national championships in 2009, failing to advance to the finals in both the indoor 400 m and outdoor 400 m hurdles. She completed her last international season in 2010.

== Personal life ==
Barnes was born on November 14, 1983 and she attended Harrisburg High School in Harrisburg, Pennsylvania. She graduated in 2001 and then enrolled at Barton County Community College. She gave birth to a son, Devin, and took a one-year break before enrolling at Louisiana Tech University in 2005.

Barnes was sponsored by Nike, Inc. and was coached by Shawn Jackson while in college. She lived in Ruston, Louisiana while training for the 2008 Olympic trials.

== Statistics ==
=== Personal best progression ===
400 m progression
#	Mark	Pl.	Competition	Venue	Date	Ref.
1	55.41	3rd place, bronze medalist(s)	KJCCC	Coffeyville, KS	April 29, 2005	
2	54.82A	4th	National Junior College Athletic Association Championships	Levelland, TX	May 17, 2005	
3	54.13	(gold) (Heat 2)	WAC	Fresno, CA	May 10, 2007	
4	53.16 sh	(silver) (Heat 7)	Tyson	Fayetteville, AR	February 14, 2008	
5	53.12 sh	(bronze) (Round 1)	USA Outdoor Track and Field Championships	Boston, MA	February 23, 2008	
6	53.06	(gold) (Round 2)	Tiger Inv	Baton Rouge, LA	April 11, 2008	
7	52.61	5th	Athletissima	Lausanne, Switzerland	September 1, 2008	

400 m Hurdles progression
#	Mark	Pl.	Competition	Venue	Date	Ref.
1	1:00.95	1st place, gold medalist(s)	Mississippi State Bulldog Invitational	Starkville, MS	March 31, 2006	
2	1:00.55	1st place, gold medalist(s)	Louisiana Tech Jim Mize Tech Twilight	Ruston, LA	April 10, 2006	
3	59.80	2nd place, silver medalist(s)	Alumni Gold	Baton Rouge, LA	April 21, 2006	
4	57.06	1st place, gold medalist(s)	Western Athletic Conference Championships	Honolulu, HI	May 12, 2006	
5	56.97	5th	Mideast	Columbia, MO	May 25, 2007	
6	56.57	1st place, gold medalist(s)	Ole Miss Inv	Oxford, MS	May 2, 2008	
7	56.23	(gold) (Heat 4)	USA Outdoor Track and Field Championships	Eugene, OR	June 26, 2008	
8	55.35	(silver) (Semifinal 1)	USA Outdoor Track and Field Championships	Eugene, OR	June 27, 2008	
