= 2004 IAAF World Indoor Championships – Women's 4 × 400 metres relay =

The Women's 4 × 400 metres relay event at the 2004 IAAF World Indoor Championships was held on 7 March 2004.

The winning margin was a huge 6.08 seconds which as of July 2024 remains the only time the women's 4 × 400 metres relay was won by more than five seconds at these championships.

== Medalists ==
Gold	Silver	Bronze
Russia; Olesya Forsheva; Olga Kotlyarova; Tatyana Levina; Natalya Nazarova; Olesya Zykina*; Natalya Antyukh*	Belarus; Natallia Solohub; Anna Kozak; Ilona Usovich; Sviatlana Usovich	Romania; Angela Moroșanu; Alina Râpanu; Maria Rus; Ionela Târlea

* Runners who participated in the heats only and received medals.

== Results ==
=== Heats ===
Qualification: First 2 teams of each heat (Q) plus the next 2 fastest (q) advance to the final.

Rank	Heat	Nation	Athletes	Time	Notes
1	1	Belarus	Natallia Solohub, Anna Kozak, Ilona Usovich, Sviatlana Usovich	3:31.25	Q, WL
2	1	Russia	Olesya Zykina, Olga Kotlyarova, Tatyana Levina, Natalya Antyukh	3:31.27	Q, SB
3	1	Jamaica	Ronetta Smith, Allison Beckford, Sheryl Morgan, Michelle Burgher	3:32.29	q, SB
4	2	Poland	Zuzanna Radecka, Monika Bejnar, Małgorzata Pskit, Grażyna Prokopek	3:32.44	Q, NR
5	2	Romania	Angela Moroșanu, Alina Râpanu, Maria Rus, Ionela Târlea	3:32.45	Q, NR
6	2	Greece	Elefthería Papadopoulou, Hrisoula Goudenoudi, Yeoryía Koumnaki, Fani Chalkia	3:32.88	q, NR
7	2	Great Britain	Melanie Purkiss, Carey Marshall, Liz Fairs, Jennifer Meadows	3:33.30	SB
8	2	United States	Ellannee Richardson, Virginia Johnson, Natasha Hastings, Moushaumi Robinson	3:33.38	SB
9	1	Ireland	Karen Shinkins, Ciara Sheehy, Michelle Carey, Joanne Cuddihy	3:34.61	NR
10	1	Sweden	Beatrice Dahlgren, Ellinor Stuhrmann, Erica Mårtensson, Louise Gundert	3:34.71	NR
11	2	Spain	Elena Córcoles, Cora Olivero, Daisy Antonio, Laia Forcadell	3:38.01	SB

=== Final ===
Rank	Nation	Athletes	Time	Notes
1st place, gold medalist(s)	Russia	Olesya Forsheva, Olga Kotlyarova, Tatyana Levina, Natalya Nazarova	3:23.88	WR
2nd place, silver medalist(s)	Belarus	Natallia Solohub, Anna Kozak, Ilona Usovich, Sviatlana Usovich	3:29.96	NR
3rd place, bronze medalist(s)	Romania	Angela Moroșanu, Alina Râpanu, Maria Rus, Ionela Târlea	3:30.06	NR
4	Poland	Zuzanna Radecka, Monika Bejnar, Małgorzata Pskit, Grażyna Prokopek	3:30.52	NR
5	Jamaica	Ronetta Smith, Allison Beckford, Michelle Ballentine, Michelle Burgher	3:33.77	
6	Greece	Elefthería Papadopoulou, Hrisoula Goudenoudi, Yeoryía Koumnaki, Fani Chalkia	3:39.23	
