= 2002 European Athletics Championships – Women's 4 × 400 metres relay =

Women's 4 × 400 metres relay at the European Athletics Championships

The women's 4 × 400 metres relay at the 2002 European Athletics Championships were held at the Olympic Stadium on August 10–11.

== Medalists ==
Gold	Silver	Bronze
Germany; Florence Ekpo-Umoh; Birgit Rockmeier; Claudia Marx; Grit Breuer; Nancy Kette	Russia; Natalya Antyukh; Natalya Nazarova; Anastasiya Kapachinskaya; Olesya Zykina; Yekaterina Bakhvalova; Tatyana Levina	Poland; Zuzanna Radecka; Grażyna Prokopek; Małgorzata Pskit; Anna Olichwierczuk; Justyna Karolkiewicz

== Results ==
=== Heats ===
Qualification: First 3 of each heat (Q) and the next 2 fastest (q) qualified for the final.

Rank	Heat	Nation	Athlete	Time	Notes
1	1	Germany	Florence Ekpo-Umoh, Nancy Kette, Claudia Marx, Grit Breuer	3:28.48	Q
2	1	Poland	Zuzanna Radecka, Justyna Karolkiewicz, Anna Olichwierczuk, Grażyna Prokopek	3:29.20	Q
3	2	Russia	Natalya Antyukh, Yekaterina Bakhvalova, Tatyana Levina, Natalya Nazarova	3:30.94	Q
4	1	Belarus	Yekaterina Stankevich, Iryna Khliustava, Anna Kozak, Sviatlana Usovich	3:30.95	Q
5	1	France	Marie-Louise Bévis, Solene Désert, Sylvanie Morandais, Peggy Babin	3:31.57	q
6	2	Great Britain	Helen Karagounis, Helen Frost, Melanie Purkiss, Lee McConnell	3:33.88	Q
7	2	Sweden	Beatrice Dahlgren, Lena Udd, Ellinor Stuhrmann, Nadja Petersen	3:34.15	Q
8	2	Greece	Dimitra Dova, Hariklia Bouda, Maria Papadopoulou, Hrisoula Goudenoudi	3:35.02	q
9	2	Portugal	Patrícia Lopes, Sandra Teixeira, Severina Cravid, Carmo Tavares	3:35.36	
10	1	Spain	María Paz Maqueda, Miriam Bravo, Mayte Martínez, Julia Alba	3:37.08	

=== Final ===
Rank	Nation	Athletes	Time	Notes
1st place, gold medalist(s)	Germany	Florence Ekpo-Umoh, Birgit Rockmeier, Claudia Marx, Grit Breuer	3:25.10	EL
2nd place, silver medalist(s)	Russia	Natalya Antyukh, Natalya Nazarova, Anastasiya Kapachinskaya, Olesya Zykina	3:25.59	SB
3rd place, bronze medalist(s)	Poland	Zuzanna Radecka, Grażyna Prokopek, Małgorzata Pskit, Anna Olichwierczuk	3:26.15	SB
4	Great Britain	Helen Karagounis, Helen Frost, Melanie Purkiss, Lee McConnell	3:26.65	SB
5	France	Solene Désert, Peggy Babin, Sylvanie Morandais, Marie-Louise Bévis	3:31.71	
6	Belarus	Yekaterina Stankevich, Iryna Khliustava, Anna Kozak, Sviatlana Usovich	3:32.46	
7	Sweden	Beatrice Dahlgren, Lena Udd, Ellinor Stuhrmann, Nadja Petersen	3:32.65	
8	Greece	Dimitra Dova, Hariklia Bouda, Maria Papadopoulou, Hrisoula Goudenoudi	3:37.38	
