= Angel Perkins =

American sprinter (born 1984)

Personal information
- Born: October 5, 1984 (age 41)
- Home town: Cerritos, California, US
- Education: Gahr High School; University of Arizona; Baylor University; Boston University

Sport
- Country: United States
- Sport: Sport of athletics
- Events: 400 metres 400 metres hurdles
- College team: Arizona Wildcats; Baylor Bears

Achievements and titles
- National finals: 2000 USA U20s; • 400 m, 1st (gold); 2001 USA Champs; • 200 m, 3rd (bronze); 2002 USA U20s; • 100 m, 7th; 2003 USA U20s; • 200 m, 4th; • 400 m, 2nd (silver); 2006 NCAA Indoors; • 4 × 400 m, 9th; 2006 NCAAs; • 4 × 400 m, 5th; 2008 USA Indoors; • 400 m, 5th; 2008 USA Champs; • 400 m hurdles, 7th
- Personal bests: 400 mH: 56.08 (2008); 400 m: 51.73 (2007); 200 m: 23.07 (±0.0) (2001)
Medal record
Women's athletics
Representing the United States
World Indoor Championships
Bronze medal – third place	2008 Valencia	4 × 400 m relay
World U18 Championships
Gold medal – first place	2001 Debrecen	200 m
Gold medal – first place	2001 Debrecen	Sprint medley relay
Pan American Games
Bronze medal – third place	2007 Rio de Janeiro	4 × 400 m relay
Pan American U20 Championships
Silver medal – second place	2003 Bridgetown	400 m
Gold medal – first place	2003 Bridgetown	4 × 400 m relay
- Updated on November 2024

Angel Perkins (born October 5, 1984) is an American former hurdler and sprinter specializing in the 400 metres and the 2008 World Athletics Indoor Championships bronze medalist in the 4 × 400 m relay. As a prep, she won gold medals at the 2001 World U18 Championships in the 200 m and medley relay, and was described as among the best high school sprinters ever in the 100 m and 200 m and world-class on the 400 m. While competing for the Baylor Bears track and field team, she went on to win medals at both the Pan American junior and senior athletics championships before earning World Indoor bronze in 2008.

== Career ==
Running for Gahr High School, Perkins won the 200 m and 400 meter titles at the 2000 CIF Southern Section Division I championships. She went on to place 2nd in both at the 2000 CIF California State Meet. She went on to win the 400 m national title at that year's USA U20 Outdoor Track and Field Championships. At just 15 years old, Perkins qualified for the 2000 United States Olympic trials and finished 5th in her 400 m heat.

The following year, Perkins won the state title in the 200 m. She then finished 4th in the 200 m at the senior 2001 USA Outdoor Track and Field Championships, running 23.46 into a -1.4 m/s headwind. In 2004, the 4th-place finish was upgraded to 3rd as the original 3rd-placer Kelli White was disqualified for doping. As a 16 year old running against adults, Perkins' finish was unexpected.

Perkins qualified to compete at the 2001 World Youth Championships, where she entered in both the 200 m and the sprint medley relay. In the 200 m, Perkins won the gold medal in a best of 23.07 seconds. The mark was the 9th-fastest high school performance in history. In the sprint medley, Perkins ran third leg with Ashley Lodree, Allyson Felix, and Stephanie Smith and won another gold medal. Following her 2001 season, Perkins committed to run for the Arizona Wildcats track and field team.

Perkins placed 7th in the 100 m at the 2002 U.S. U20 Outdoor Championships and she did not compete internationally that summer. The following year, Perkins finished 4th and 2nd in the 200 m and 400 m at the 2003 U20 Championships, qualifying her to represent the U.S. at the 2003 Pan American U20 Athletics Championships in the 400 m and 4 × 400 m relay. In the 400 m, Perkins won her heat and finished runner-up in the finals behind Stephanie Smith, while in the 4 × 400 m the U.S. team won the gold medal by over 7 seconds.

Perkins made her first Olympic bid the following year, attempting to qualify at the 2004 United States Olympic trials. She advanced past the quarter-finals but placed 7th in her semi-final and didn't qualify for the Olympic team. After transferring to the Baylor Bears track and field team, Perkins qualified for the 2005 NCAA Division I Outdoor Track and Field Championships in only the 4 × 400 m relay, failing to make the finals.

She improved upon her NCAA finish in 2006, first placing 9th in the 4 × 400 m at the indoor NCAA championships and then performing in the 400 m and both sprint relays at the 2006 NCAA Division I Outdoor Track and Field Championships. She finished 5th in her 400 m semi-final and her 4 × 100 m team failed to advance, but her 4 × 400 m team did qualify for the finals where they placed 5th.

After advancing to national semifinals in both the 2007 USA indoor 60 m and outdoor 400 m, Perkins was selected to represent the U.S. at both the 2007 NACAC Championships (individually in the 400 m) and at the Athletics at the 2007 Pan American Games (in the 4 × 400 m). At the NACAC Championships, Perkins finished 5th in the 400 m finals, and at the Pan American Games Perkins ran the 2nd leg to help the U.S. team win the bronze medal.

Perkins achieved her greatest international success during the 2008 indoor season. By finishing 5th in the 400 m at the 2008 USA Indoor Track and Field Championships, she qualified for the World Indoor Championships 4 × 400 m. Leading off for the U.S. team, she and Miriam Barnes, Shareese Woods, Moushaumi Robinson won the bronze medal behind Russia and Belarus. Outdoors, Perkins picked up the 400 metres hurdles for the first time and contested that at the 2008 United States Olympic trials. She qualified for the finals but placed 5th, with only the top 3 finishers given berths to the U.S. Olympic team.

In 2009, Perkins continued to work on the 400 m hurdles but failed to advance past the first round at the 2009 USA Outdoor Track and Field Championships. She continued to race inside California in the following years, but did not compete at another national championship and competed at her final high-level race in 2016.

== Personal life ==
Perkins was born on 5 October 1984 and grew up in the Cerritos, California area attending Gahr High School. She has three brothers and two sisters, including one who played basketball for California State University, San Bernardino. She first studied at the University of Arizona before transferring to Baylor University, where she earned a bachelor's degree in economics in 2009. In 2012, she earned a master's degree in criminal justice at Boston University.

In 2010, Perkins coached the track and field team at Los Angeles Southwest College. In her first year of coaching, she coached Shakina Phillips to a CA junior college state title in the 100 m hurdles and 2nd place in the 400 m hurdles. She went on to coach the women's sprinters and hurdlers on the Cerritos Falcons track and field team.

== Statistics ==
=== Personal best progression ===
400 m progression
#	Mark	Pl.	Competition	Venue	Date	Ref.
1	54.30	1st place, gold medalist(s)	NatSch	New York, NY	11 Mar 2000	
2	52.62	1st place, gold medalist(s)	Arcadia Invitational	Glendora, CA	7 Apr 2000	
3	52.52	1st place, gold medalist(s)		Glendora, CA	8 Apr 2000	
4	52.28	1st place, gold medalist(s)		Norwalk, CA	19 May 2000	
5	52.06	2nd place, silver medalist(s)	USA U19 Championships	Stanford, CA	21 Jun 2003	
6	51.73	6th (Semifinal 2)	USA Outdoor Track and Field Championships	Indianapolis, IN	21 Jun 2007	
