= 2008 IAAF World Indoor Championships – Women's 4 × 400 metres relay =

The women's 4 × 400 m relay at the 2008 IAAF World Indoor Championships was held on 9 March in Valencia, Spain. Unlike the men's event, the race was held as a straight final with no heats.

== Medalists ==
Gold
Russia	Yulia Gushchina; Tatyana Levina; Natalya Nazarova; Olesya Zykina
Silver
Belarus	Anna Kozak; Iryna Khliustava; Sviatlana Usovich; Ilona Usovich
Bronze
United States	Angel Perkins; Miriam Barnes; Shareese Woods; Moushaumi Robinson

== Final ==
Pos	Lane	Team	Mark	React
Gold medal	5	Russia	3:28.17 WL	0.262
Gold medal	Yulia Gushchina, Tatyana Levina, Natalya Nazarova, Olesya Zykina			
Silver medal	6	Belarus	3:28.90 SB	0.288
Silver medal	Anna Kozak, Iryna Khliustava, Sviatlana Usovich, Ilona Usovich			
Bronze medal	4	United States	3:29.30 SB	0.279
Bronze medal	Angel Perkins, Miriam Barnes, Shareese Woods, Moushaumi Robinson			
4	2	Czech Republic	3:34.53 SB	0.277
4	Zuzana Bergrová, Denisa Ščerbová, Jitka Bartoničková, Zuzana Hejnová			
5	1	Romania	3:36.79 SB	0.237
5	Anamaria Ioniță, Iuliana Popescu, Elena Mirela Lavric, Angela Moroșanu			
6	3	Poland	3:36.97	0.373
6	Agnieszka Karpiesiuk, Ewelina Sętowska-Dryk, Jolanta Wójcik, Bożena Łukasik			
