= 2003 IAAF World Indoor Championships – Women's 4 × 400 metres relay =

The women's 4 × 400 metres relay event at the 2003 IAAF World Indoor Championships was held on March 16.

== Results ==
Rank	Nation	Competitors	Time	Notes
1st place, gold medalist(s)	Russia	Natalya Antyukh, Yuliya Pechenkina, Olesya Zykina, Natalya Nazarova	3:28.45	WL
2nd place, silver medalist(s)	Jamaica	Ronetta Smith, Catherine Scott, Sheryl Morgan, Sandie Richards	3:31.23	
3rd place, bronze medalist(s)	United States	Monique Hennagan, Meghan Addy, Brenda Taylor, Mary Wineberg	3:31.69	
4	Great Britain	Jennifer Meadows, Danielle Halsall, Amy Spencer, Catherine Murphy	3:32.18	NR
5	Ukraine	Antonina Yefremova, Tetyana Debela, Nataliya Zhuravlyova-Vdovychenko, Nataliya Makukh	3:36.18	
