= Nadia Davy =

Jamaican sprinter (born 1980)

Personal information
- National team: Jamaica
- Born: 24 December 1980 (age 45) Jamaica
- Education: Louisiana State University
- Occupations: instructional aide, assistant track and field coach
- Employer: Bridgeton High School
- Height: 5 ft 8 in (173 cm)
- Weight: 119 lb (54 kg)

Sport
- Country: Jamaica
- Sport: track and field
- Events: 400m, 4x400m relay
- University team: Louisiana State University

Achievements and titles
- Olympic finals: 2004 Athens Summer Olympics
- National finals: JAAA/Supreme Ventures National Senior Championships: 1st Place in 400m (50.76)
Medal record
Women's athletics
Representing Jamaica
Olympic Games
Bronze medal – third place	2004 Athens	4x400m relay
- Updated on 4 February 2016

Nadia Davy (born 24 December 1980) is a Jamaican American track and field athlete, competing internationally for Jamaica. She was a bronze medalist in the 4 x 400 meter relay at the 2004 Olympic Games in Athens, Greece.

== Early life ==
Davy was born in Jamaica but grew up in Bridgeton, New Jersey. She graduated from Bridgeton High School, where she ran track, in 1999. She set a Bridgeton High School record in the 400 meter dash with a time of 54.04 seconds. She earned six state titles in high school, including ones in the 1999 indoor and outdoor 400 meter championships.

== College ==
Davy went to Louisiana State University to run track after high school. She was a seven-time All American at LSU and currently holds the school record in the Women's 400 meters with a time of 50.66 seconds, which she set in 2003 in her junior year.

Davy qualified for the 2004 Jamaican Olympic team after a first-place finish in the 400 meter (50.76 seconds) at the JAAA/Supreme Ventures National Senior Championships in Kingston, Jamaica.

== Olympics ==
Davy ran two events in Athens, the 400 meter individual and the 4x400 meter relay. In the 400 meter, she ran a time of 52.04 seconds and did not place.

She won a bronze medal for the 4 x 400 meter relay (3:22:00). Davy contributed a time of 50.24 seconds during the third leg.

== Today ==
Davy no longer lives in Bridgeton, New Jersey where she worked at her high school as an instructional aide and assistant track coach. She has a son and a daughter. She also has her master's degree in counseling from Wilmington University in Delaware.
