= Athletics at the 2004 Summer Olympics – Women's 4 × 400 metres relay =

Women's 4 × 400 metres relay at the Games of the XXVIII Olympiad
- Venue: Athens Olympic Stadium
- Dates: 27 August 2004 (round 1); 28 August 2004 (final)
- Competitors: 71 from 16 nations
- Winning time: 3:19.01

Medalists
1st place, gold medalist(s)		DeeDee Trotter, Monique Henderson, Sanya Richards, Monique Hennagan, Moushaumi Robinson*	United States
2nd place, silver medalist(s)		Olesya Krasnomovets, Natalya Nazarova, Olesya Zykina, Natalya Antyukh, Tatyana Firova*, Natalia Ivanova*	Russia
3rd place, bronze medalist(s)		Novlene Williams, Michelle Burgher, Nadia Davy, Sandie Richards, Ronetta Smith* * Indicates the athlete only competed in the preliminary heats.	Jamaica

The women's 4 × 400 metres relay at the 2004 Summer Olympics as part of the athletics program was held at the Athens Olympic Stadium from August 27 to 28. The sixteen teams competed in a two-heat qualifying round in which the first three teams from each heat, together with the next two fastest teams, were given a place in the final race.

Russian Olesya Krasnomovets was out hard down the backstretch, passing Britain's Donna Fraser on her outside and opening up a lead over American DeeDee Trotter chasing to the inside. But Trotter did not let Krasnomovets go, gaining steadily through the second turn and speeding down the final straightaway to draw even by the handoff to Monique Henderson, giving the U.S. the lead. Novlene Williams put Jamaica in strong contention a couple of metres behind the Russians. Through her leg, Henderson expanded the American gap to six metres. Natalya Nazarova also opened up a little more space on Jamaica.

During the second handoff while in sixth place, Greece's Dimitra Dova was given an inadvertent flat tire by teammate Hrisoula Goudenoudi. Dova tried to fix her shoe, then stepped into the infield in frustration before returning to the track. Greece would eventually finish 17 seconds behind the next to last finisher.

Through the third leg, Sanya Richards held a steady three metre lead over Olesya Zykina, while Nadia Davy slightly gained on Zykina from behind. Coming onto the final straight, Richards exploded, pulling away as Davy pulled to the outside to put her move on Zykina. They ran even for half the straightaway before Zykina was able to regain command. Monique Hennagan left with a clear lead for America, the Russians exchanged cleanly with Natalya Antyukh in hot pursuit. But as the Jamaicans exchanged, Sandie Richards ran into the back of Zykina. As Richards stopped and sidestepped, she lost several metres and the chance at silver. Hennigan opened up to about 12 meters halfway through the lap, slowing the second half to cross the finish line with just less than a ten-meter advantage in the gold-medal time of 3:19.01.

In 2010, Crystal Cox, who only ran for the U.S. team in the prelims, admitted to using anabolic steroids from 2001 to 2004. As a result, she forfeited all of her results from that time period, and agreed to a four-year suspension, until January 2014. In 2013, both the IAAF and the IOC announced that the result would stand and the American squad (except Cox) would be allowed to retain their gold medals because, according to the rules of the time, a team should not be disqualified because of a doping offense of an athlete who didn't compete in the finals. Russia's Tatyana Firova from the preliminary round in 2004, became one of two Russian athletes to cause disqualification in 2008. Russia has not been disqualified in 2004 but was disqualified in 2012 for numerous doping violations. And the entire Russian athletics team was banned from the 2016 games for its state-sponsored doping.

== Records ==
Prior to the competition, the existing World and Olympic records were as follows:

World record	Soviet Union (URS); Tatyana Ledovskaya; Olga Nazarova; Mariya Pinigina; Olga Bryzgina	3:15.17	Seoul, South Korea	1 October 1988
Olympic record	Soviet Union; Tatyana Ledovskaya; Olga Nazarova; Mariya Pinigina; Olga Bryzgina	3:15.17	Seoul, South Korea	1 October 1988

No new records were set during the competition.

== Qualification ==
The qualification period for athletics was 1 January 2003 to 9 August 2004. A National Olympic Committee (NOC) could enter one qualified relay team per relay event, with a maximum of six athletes. For this event, an NOC would be invited to participate with a relay team if the average of the team's two best times, obtained in IAAF-sanctioned meetings or tournaments, would be among the best sixteen, at the end of this period.

== Schedule ==
All times are Greece Standard Time (UTC+2)

Date	Time	Round
Friday, 27 August 2004	20:35	Round 1
Saturday, 28 August 2004	22:00	Final

== Results ==
=== Round 1 ===
Qualification rule: The first three teams in each heat (Q) plus the next two fastest overall (q) moved on to the final.

==== Heat 1 ====
Rank	Lane	Nation	Competitors	Time	Notes
1	1	Russia	Olesya Krasnomovets, Natalya Ivanova, Tatyana Firova, Olesya Zykina	3:23.52	Q, SB
2	5	Jamaica	Ronetta Smith, Michelle Burgher, Nadia Davy, Sandie Richards	3:24.92	Q, SB
3	3	Poland	Zuzanna Radecka, Monika Bejnar, Małgorzata Pskit, Grażyna Prokopek	3:25.05	Q, SB
4	7	Great Britain	Christine Ohuruogu, Catherine Murphy, Helen Karagounis, Lee McConnell	3:26.99	q, SB
5	4	Romania	Angela Moroșanu, Alina Rîpanu, Maria Rus, Ionela Târlea-Manolache	3:27.36	q
6	8	Belarus	Natallia Solohub, Irina Khlyustova, Ilona Usovich, Sviatlana Usovich	3:27.38	SB
7	6	Cameroon	Mireille Nguimgo, Hortense Béwouda, Carole Kaboud Mebam, Muriel Noah Ahanda	3:29.93	SB
8	2	Nigeria	Ngozi Nwokocha, Gloria Amuche Nwosu, Halimat Ismaila, Christy Ekpukhon	3:30.78	SB

==== Heat 2 ====
Rank	Lane	Nation	Competitors	Time	Notes
1	1	United States	Crystal Cox, Moushaumi Robinson, Monique Henderson, Sanya Richards	3:23.79	Q
2	6	Greece	Hariklia Bouda, Hrisoula Goudenoudi, Dimitra Dova, Faní Halkiá	3:26.70	Q
3	7	India	Rajwinder Kaur, K. M. Beenamol, Chitra K. Soman, Manjit Kaur	3:26.89	Q, NR
4	2	Germany	Claudia Hoffmann, Claudia Marx, Jana Neubert, Grit Breuer	3:27.75	
5	3	Mexico	Liliana Allen, Magali Yañez, Ana Guevara, Mayra González	3:27.88	NR
6	4	Brazil	Maria Laura Almirao, Josiane Tito, Geisa Coutinho, Lucimar Teodoro	3:28.43	SB
7	8	Ukraine	Oleksandra Ryzhkova, Oksana Ilyushkina, Antonina Yefremova, Nataliya Pyhyda	3:28.62	
8	5	Senegal	Aïda Diop, Mame Tacko Diouf, Aminata Diouf, Fatou Bintou Fall	3:35.18	

=== Final ===
Rank	Lane	Nation	Competitors	Time	Notes
1st place, gold medalist(s)	5	United States	DeeDee Trotter, Monique Henderson, Sanya Richards, Monique Hennagan	3:19.01	SB
2nd place, silver medalist(s)	6	Russia	Olesya Krasnomovets, Natalya Nazarova, Olesya Zykina, Natalya Antyukh	3:20.16	SB
3rd place, bronze medalist(s)	3	Jamaica	Novlene Williams, Michelle Burgher, Nadia Davy, Sandie Richards	3:22.00	SB
4	7	Great Britain	Donna Fraser, Catherine Murphy, Christine Ohuruogu, Lee McConnell	3:25.12	SB
5	8	Poland	Zuzanna Radecka, Monika Bejnar, Małgorzata Pskit, Grażyna Prokopek	3:25.22	
6	1	Romania	Angela Moroșanu, Alina Rapanu, Maria Rus, Ionela Târlea-Manolache	3:26.81	SB
7	2	India	Sathi Geetha, K. M. Beenamol, Chitra K. Soman, Rajwinder Kaur	3:28.51	
8	4	Greece	Hariklia Bouda, Hrisoula Goudenoudi, Dimitra Dova, Faní Halkiá	3:45.70	
