= 2008 USA Indoor Track and Field Championships =

- Dates: February 23-24
- Host city: Boston, Massachusetts, United States
- Venue: Reggie Lewis Track and Athletic Center
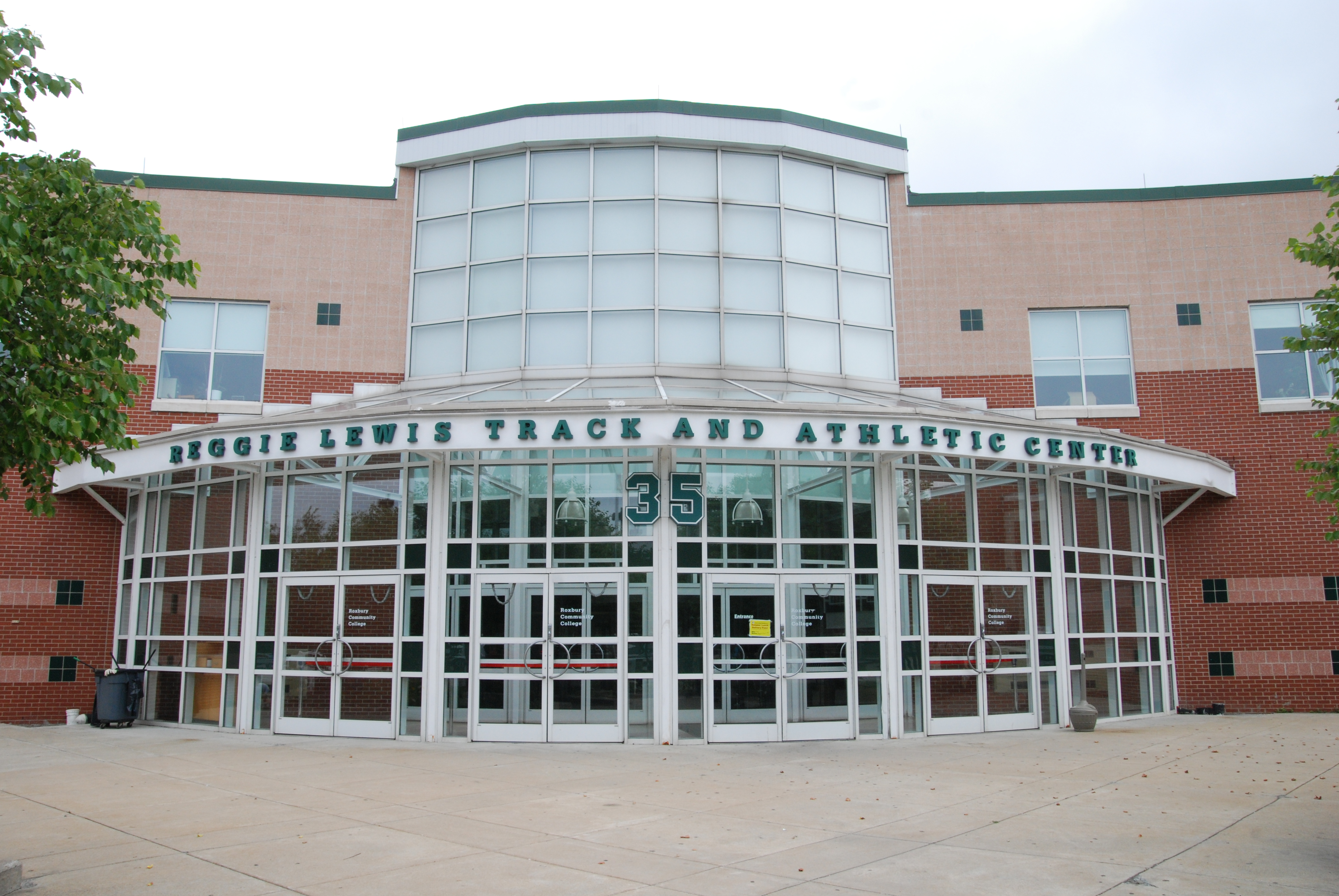
- Level: Senior
- Type: Indoor
- Events: 28 (14 men's + 14 women's)

The 2008 USA Indoor Track and Field Championships were held at the Reggie Lewis Track and Athletic Center in Boston, Massachusetts. Organized by USA Track and Field (USATF), the two-day competition took place February 23-24 and served as the national championships in indoor track and field for the United States. The championships in combined track and field events were held at a later date.

The meeting served as a qualifier for the United States team at the 2008 IAAF World Indoor Championships. At the meeting, Christian Cantwell had hoped to break the indoor shot put world record, but he couldn't do it because the shot puts were only 125 millimetres (4.9 in) in diameter rather than his preferred 128 millimetres (5.0 in). He had asked a competitor Reese Hoffa to bring 128 mm shot puts, but Hoffa declined saying it wasn't his job to help a competitor, causing Cantwell to be "upset with him" making the World Indoors team. There was a photo finish in the men's 800 m, with many having thought that Nick Symmonds had actually won the race.

== Medal summary ==
=== Men ===
Event	Gold		Silver		Bronze	
60 m	Michael Rodgers	6.54	Leroy Dixon	6.56	Monzavous Edwards	6.57
400 m	David Neville	46.34	Greg Nixon	46.72	Jamaal Torrance	46.76
800 m	Khadevis Robinson	1:46.95	Nicholas Symmonds	1:46.96	Ryan Brown	1:47.99
1500 m	Rob Myers	3:40.89	Russell Wolf Brown	3:41.20	Steve Sherer	3:41.52
3000 m	Matt Tegenkamp	8:02.52	Chris Solinsky	8:03.80	Jonathon Riley	8:04.86
60 m hurdles	David Oliver	7.47	Allen Johnson	7.53	Joel Brown	7.54
5000 m walk	Matthew Boyles	20:30.00	Patrick Stroupe	20:59.83	Stephen Quirke	22:31.90
High jump	Andra Manson	2.30 m	Jesse Williams	2.28 m	Jamie Nieto	2.25 m
Pole vault	Brad Walker	5.70 m	Rory Quiller	5.60 m	Toby Stevenson	5.60 m
Pole vault	Brad Walker	5.70 m	Rory Quiller	5.60 m	Derek Miles	5.60 m
Long jump	Trevell Quinley	7.82 m	Joe Allen	7.71 m	Mike Morrison	7.70 m
Triple jump	Aarik Wilson	16.91 m	Kenta Bell	16.73 m	Rafeeq Curry	16.59 m
Shot put	Christian Cantwell	21.51 m	Reese Hoffa	21.40 m	Adam Nelson	21.25 m
Weight throw	Kibwe Johnson	25.12 m	AG Kruger	24.07 m	Thomas Freeman	22.29 m
Heptathlon	Jake Arnold	5851 pts	Stephen Moore	5794 pts	Joe Detmer	5603 pts

=== Women ===
Event	Gold		Silver		Bronze	
60 m	Angela Williams	7.11	Alexis Joyce	7.21 (7.203)	Carmelita Jeter	7.21 (7.206)
400 m	Shareese Woods	52.03	Moushaumi Robinson	52.33	Mary Wineberg	52.36
800 m	Nicole Teter	2:02.65	Nicole Cook	2:02.86	Morgan Uceny	2:04.12
1500 m	Christin Wurth	4:14.21	Jenelle Deatherage	4:17.38	Sara Hall	4:19.23
3000 m	Shannon Rowbury	8:55.19	Jennifer Rhines	8:59.98	Julie Culley	9:00.14
60 m hurdles	Lolo Jones	7.88	Candice Davis	7.90	Kellie Wells	8.02
3000 m walk	Teresa Vaill	13:08.40	Joanne Dow	13:09.61	Sam Cohen	13:44.91
High jump	Amy Acuff	1.92 m	Chaunte Howard	1.89 m	Deirdre Mullen	1.86 m
Pole vault	Jennifer Stuczynski	4.70 m	Jillian Schwartz	4.50 m	Chelsea Johnson	4.50 m
Long jump	Hyleas Fountain	6.38 m	Shameka Marshall	6.38 m	Funmilayo Jimoh	6.33 m
Triple jump	Shakeema Welsch	13.94 m	Shani Marks	13.87 m	Amanda Thieschafer	13.51 m
Shot put	Jillian Camarena	18.11 m	Abigail Ruston	18.03 m	Elizabeth Wanless	18.01 m
Weight throw	Amber Campbell	23.23 m	Kristal Yush	22.62 m	Erin Gilreath	21.71 m
Pentathlon	Diana Pickler	4378 pts	Julie Pickler	4296 pts	Ryanne DuPree	4124 pts
