= Charikleia Bouda =

Greek sprinter

Personal information
- Native name: Χαρίκλεια Μπούντα
- Nationality: Greek
- Born: 17 August 1980 (age 45) Drama, Greece

Sport
- Sport: Sprinting
- Event: 4 × 400 metres relay

Charikleia Bouda (Greek: Χαρίκλεια Μπούντα; born 17 August 1980), also transliterated as Haríklia or Kharikleia, is a Greek sprinter. She competed in the women's 4 × 400 metres relay at the 2004 Summer Olympics, along with Hrisoula Goudenoudi, Dimitra Dova, and Fani Halkia.
