= Squire Creek Country Club =

Country club in Choudrant, Louisiana

- Interactive map of Squire Creek Country Club
- 32.571911°N 92.513053°W

Club information
- Location: 289 Squire Creek Parkway; Choudrant, Louisiana 71227; United States
- Established: 2002
- Type: Private
- Owner: James E. Davison
- Operator: Squire Creek Country Club and Development
- Tota holes: 18
- Tournaments: Bulldog Classic; Brooks-Bradshaw Golf Tournament; Squire Creek Invitational; Davison Cup; Argent Financial Classic
- Website: SquireCreek.com
- Designed by: Tom Fazio
- Par: 72
- Length: 7,105
- Course rating: 76.2
- Course record: 49

The Squire Creek Country Club is a private, members-only country club located in Choudrant, Louisiana, five miles northeast of Ruston. Squire Creek features an 18-hole championship golf course designed by Tom Fazio. Squire Creek is the home golf course for the Louisiana Tech Bulldogs golf team.

== History and features ==
The course has been ranked as number one in the state of Louisiana four times, and was ranked as the No. 5 best new course in the United States by Golf Digest. Squire Creek offers a golf training facility, which features dual bays with retractable doors for indoor or outdoor use, motion analysis, and launch monitor. The Squire Creek tennis facility has 6 lighted courts (4 Hydro Courts and 2 Hard Courts). Squire Creek has full service golf and tennis shops. The Squire Creek fitness facility has 2 exercise rooms and offers massage therapy. The Squire Creek Clubhouse features three dining areas: the more formal Main Dining Hall, the casual 19th Hole, and the Fazio Grill. The Squire Creek Lodge features two floors offering a combined total of seven bedrooms. The Squire Creek Pool overlooks the golf course and is served by the Waterside Cafe. The Squire Creek Development offers six residential estates including the Squire Creek Estates, Timberland Estates, Fairway Estates, The Fairways, Fairway Villas, and The Park Homes. Squire Creek Country Club is the title sponsor of the Louisiana Peach Festival in Ruston.

== Tournaments ==
Squire Creek hosted the 2005 Western Athletic Conference Golf Championships. Southern Junior Amateur Championship 2010, 2018. U.S. Women's Mid-Amateur 2015.

== Notable celebrity guests ==
- Sam Burns - Regularly
- George W. Bush - 2011
- Terry Bradshaw - 2005, 2006, 2007, 2008, 2009, 2010,2011,2012,2013,2014
- Kix Brooks - 2002, 2003, 2004, 2005, 2006, 2007, 2008, 2009, 2010,2011,2012,2013,2014
- Steve Centanni - 2007
- Ronnie Dunn - 2002
- Mike Huckabee - 2008
- Bobby Jindal - 2008
- Greta Van Susteren - 2006, 2010
- Teresa Weatherspoon - 2011
- Willie Roaf - 2011
- Tim Floyd - 2011
- Jim Wooldridge - 2011
- Mike McConathy - 2011
- Karl Malone - Regularly
- Fred Dean
- Morgan Freeman - 2012
- Bubba Watson - 2013
- Duck Dynasty - 2013
- Skip Holtz - Regularly
