= Thomas Assembly Center =

Multipurpose stadium

Samuel Thomas Assembly Center
- "The TAC"
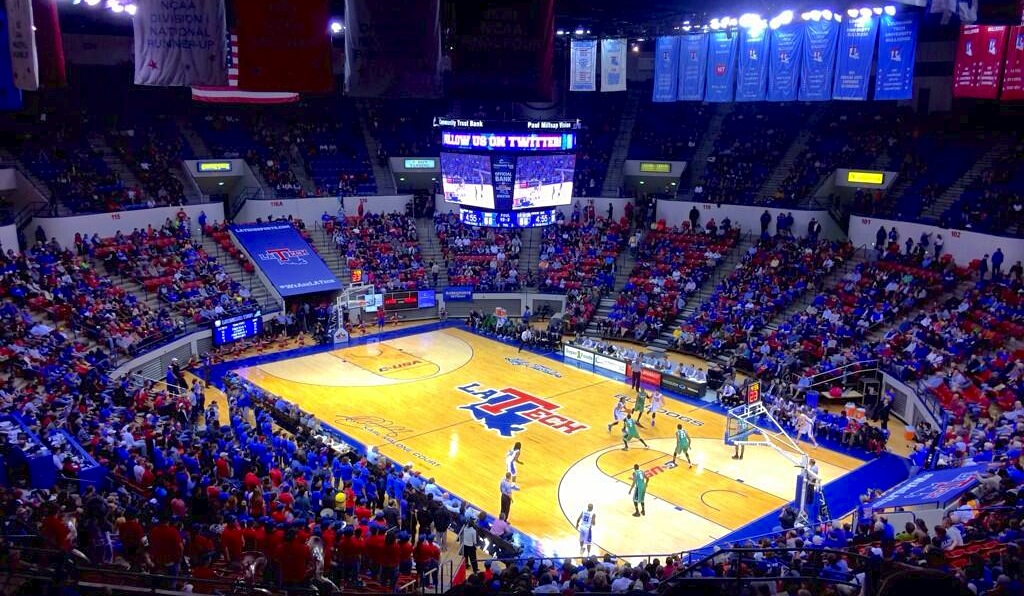
- Interactive map of Samuel Thomas Assembly Center
- Location: 1650 West Alabama Avenue; Ruston, LA 71272
- Coordinates: 32.5321°N 92.6584°W
- Owner: Louisiana Tech University
- Operator: Louisiana Tech University
- Capacity: 8,000
- Surface: Maplewood
- Record attendance: 8,975 (January 22, 1985)

Construction
- Opened: December 4, 1982
- Cost: $17.5 million
- Architects: Morgan, Hill, Sutton & Mitchell Architects, LLC.

Tenant
- Louisiana Tech Bulldogs and Lady Techsters (NCAA) (1982–present)

The Samuel M. Thomas Assembly Center is an 8,000-seat multi-purpose arena in Ruston, Louisiana. The arena, named for its benefactor and businessman Samuel M. Thomas, is home to the Division I NCAA Louisiana Tech University Bulldogs (men) and Lady Techsters (women) basketball teams. The arena also hosts concerts and events.

The arena opened in November 1982 just west of Joe Aillet Stadium, and replaced the then-30-year-old Memorial Gymnasium on the corner of Tech Drive and Railroad Avenue. The men's basketball team hosted the Southland Conference tournament in the STAC in 1985 and 1987, and four NIT games, one in 1986, two games in 2002, and one in 2015. The women's team has hosted the first, second and regional rounds of the NCAA Women's Basketball tournament nineteen times, most recently in 2003.

The TAC also serves as the home of the Louisiana Tech women's volleyball team since the program's inception in 1987.

NBA greats including Karl Malone, P.J. Brown, Randy White and Paul Millsap have called the Samuel Thomas Assembly Center home during their collegiate careers.

== Gallery ==
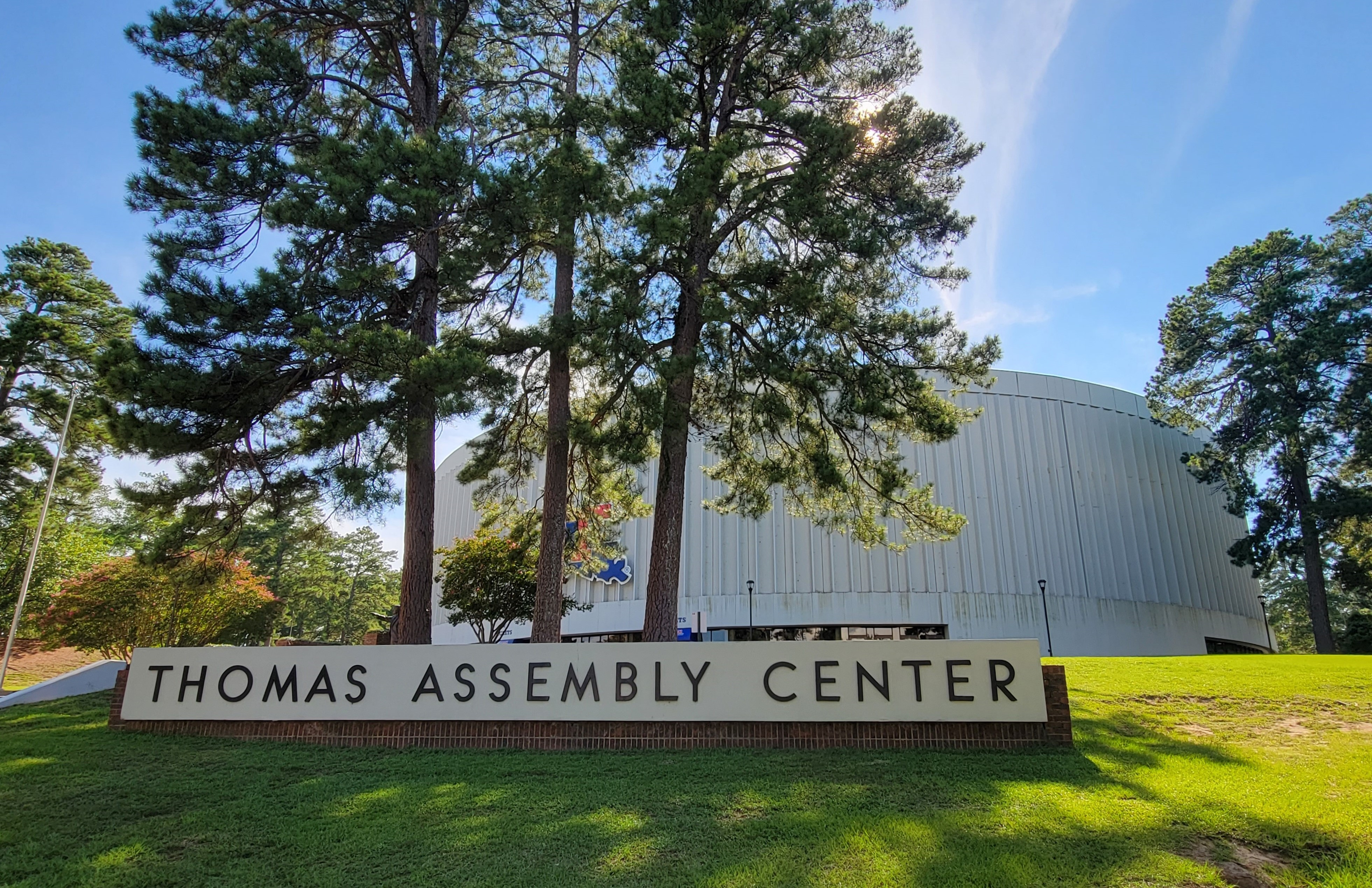
Thomas Assembly Center - Signage

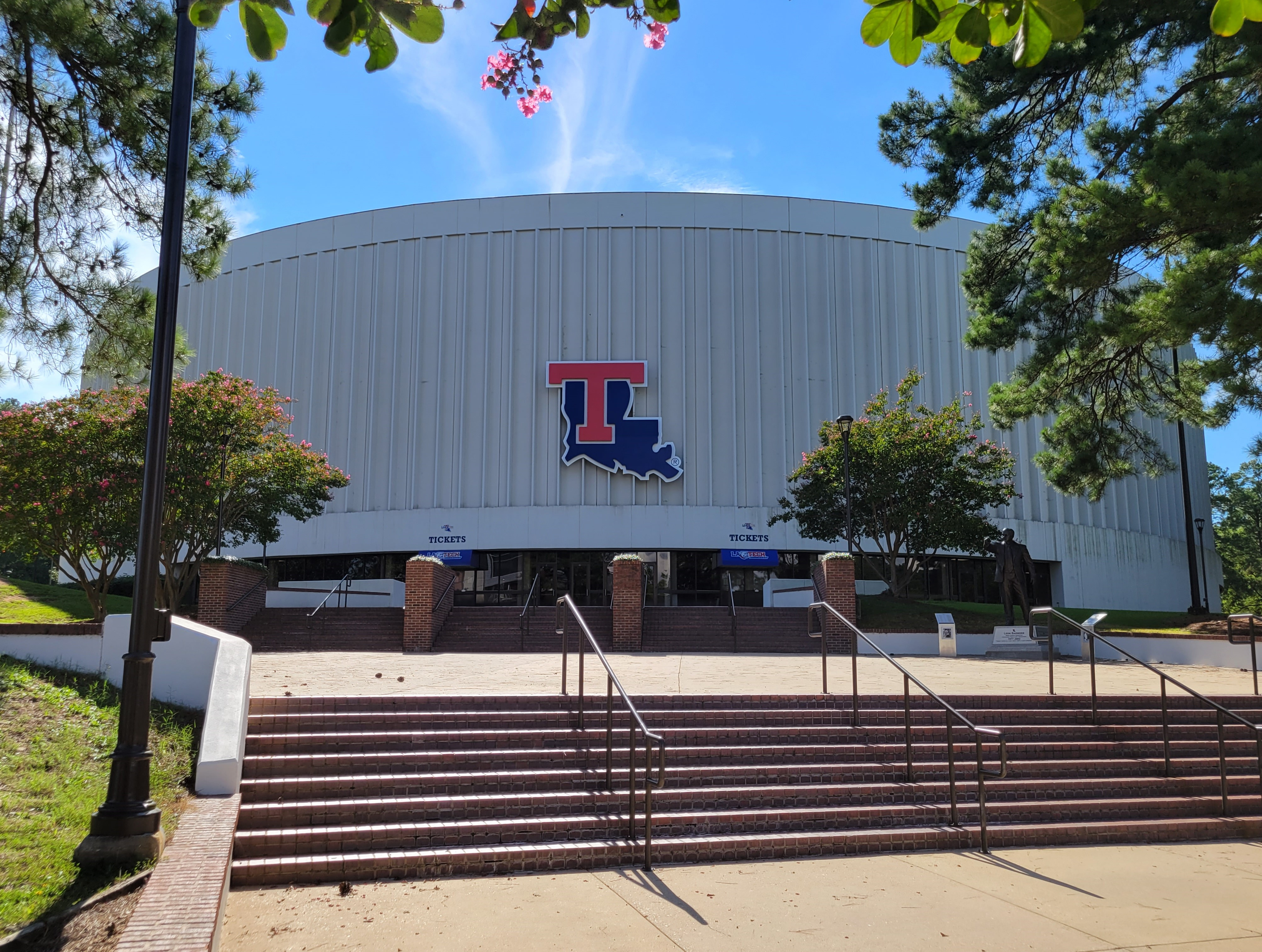
Thomas Assembly Center - Main Entrance

== See also ==
- List of convention centers in the United States
- List of NCAA Division I basketball arenas
