= Magali Yañez =

Mexican sprinter

Personal information
- Nationality: Mexican
- Born: 5 August 1981 (age 44)

Sport
- Sport: Sprinting
- Event: 4 × 400 metres relay

Magali Yañez (born 5 August 1981) is a Mexican sprinter. She competed in the women's 4 × 400 metres relay at the 2004 Summer Olympics.
