= Louisiana Tech Bulldogs and Lady Techsters =

Collegiate sports club in the United States

- University: Louisiana Tech University
- Nickname: Bulldogs (men); Lady Techsters (women)
- NCAA: Division I (FBS)
- Conference: Sun Belt
- Athletic director: Ryan Ivey
- Location: Ruston, Louisiana
- Varsity teams: 16
- Football stadium: Joe Aillet Stadium
- Basketball arena: Thomas Assembly Center
- Baseball stadium: J. C. Love Field at Pat Patterson Park
- Softball stadium: Dr. Billy Bundrick Field
- Soccer stadium: Robert Mack Caruthers Field
- Other venues: Jim Mize Track and Field Complex; Lambright Bowling Alley; Louisiana Tech Tennis Complex; Squire Creek Country Club; Tech Farm
- Colors: Blue and red
- Mascot: Tech (live); Champ (costumed)
- Fight song: Tech Fight
- Website: latechsports.com

Louisiana Tech Bulldogs and Lady Techsters, commonly abbreviated LA Tech and Dogs, refer to the sports teams of Louisiana Tech University, in Ruston, Louisiana. The teams compete in Division I of NCAA sports. Since 2026, Louisiana Tech has been a member of the Sun Belt Conference. They compete in the western division of the Sun Belt Conference.

== Sports sponsored ==
Men's sports	Women's sports
Baseball	Basketball
Basketball	Bowling
Cross country	Cross country
Football	Soccer
Golf	Softball
Track and field^{1}	Tennis
	Track and field^{1}
	Volleyball
^{1} – includes both indoor and outdoor

As a member of the Sun Belt Conference, Louisiana Tech sponsors teams in seven men's and nine women's NCAA sanctioned sports. With the Southland Bowling League, formerly home to Tech's women's bowling program, being merged into C-USA following the 2022–23 season, all Tech sports now compete in C-USA.

=== Baseball ===
The Louisiana Tech Bulldogs baseball team has won 21 regular season conference titles, four conference division titles, and three conference championship series. The Bulldogs have made eight appearances in the NCAA Baseball Tournament (11–16 overall record). Its former players include MLB players David Segui, Mike Jeffcoat, Rebel Oakes, Brian Myrow, Charlie Montoyo, and George Stone. Since the MLB Draft being in 1965, 69 Louisiana Tech players have been selected in the Major League Baseball draft.

The team plays their home games at J. C. Love Field at Pat Patterson Park. The stadium was built in 1971 and was originally known as Tech Stadium. In 1982, the stadium was renamed in honor of J.C. Love, a Ruston businessman who was a prominent supporter of the baseball program and the university. In 2008, the ballpark was named after Pat Patterson, the winningest head coach in Louisiana Tech Baseball history. Lane Burroughs is the current head coach of the Bulldog baseball team.

=== Men's basketball ===
Currently led by head coach Talvin Hester, the Tech men's basketball plays their home games at the Thomas Assembly Center with a capacity of 8,000. With a history stretching back to 1910, the Bulldogs have won 25 regular season conference championships, made six NCAA appearances and nine NIT appearances. Tech's notable men's basketball alumni include Leon Barmore, who went on to a coaching career at Tech's women's team that put him in both the Naismith Memorial and Women's Basketball Halls of Fame; Karl Malone, who entered the Naismith Hall in August 2010 for his NBA career; P.J. Brown; and Paul Millsap. Louisiana Tech appeared in the NAIA Men's Basketball National Tournament four times. (1942, 1946, 1953, and 1955).

=== Women's basketball ===
The Lady Techsters, currently led by head coach Brooke Stoehr, has been the most successful Louisiana Tech athletic team. They won the 1981, 1982 and 1988 national championships. Along the way, the Lady Techsters have competed in 13 Final Fours, 23 Sweet Sixteens, and 27 NCAA tournaments. The Lady Techsters basketball program boasts three Wade Trophy winners, five Olympic medalists, eight members of the Women's Basketball Hall of Fame, 16 All-Americans, and 21 WNBA players. The Lady Techsters have an all-time record of 1043–264 with a .798 winning percentage, the third-best all-time winning percentage of any NCAA Division I program. Louisiana Tech is one of the few women's basketball programs to win at least 1,000 games, and have they have made 27 total appearances in the NCAA Division I women's basketball tournament. Standout former Tech players include Teresa Weatherspoon (later a Lady Techsters head coach), Venus Lacy, and Karl Malone's daughter Cheryl Ford, among others. Another notable former Tech player is Women's Hall of Famer and current LSU coach Kim Mulkey, the only woman to date to have won NCAA Division I titles as a player and a head coach.

The program's first two coaches, Sonja Hogg and Leon Barmore, are also in the Women's Hall of Fame, and Barmore is in the Naismith Memorial Basketball Hall of Fame as well. It was Hogg's idea to call the team the "Lady Techsters"; when she started the program in 1974, she thought "Bulldogs" was unfeminine and feared that if she called her team the "Lady Bulldogs," it would inevitably lead to her players being called "bitches" (the female name for a dog). Barmore, who took over the reins full-time in 1985 after serving as co-head coach with Hogg for three years, was one of the most successful coaches in college basketball history, men's or women's. He lost only 87 games in 20 years, won 13 regular season titles in a 15-year span and led the Techsters to nine Final Fours from 1983 to 1999.

=== Bowling ===
The women's bowling team is coached by Matt Nantais, who has led the program since 2016. Louisiana Tech finished the 2009–10 season ranked No. 18 in the nation with a 44–31 record. The Lady Techsters' home facility is the Lambright Bowling Alley, which was completed in August 2008.

=== Cross country ===
The men's and women's cross country teams are coached by Brian Johnson, who was hired as cross country head coach in 2022. Louisiana Tech's home venue is the Tech Farm, where they host the annual Mook 4 Invitational.

=== Football ===
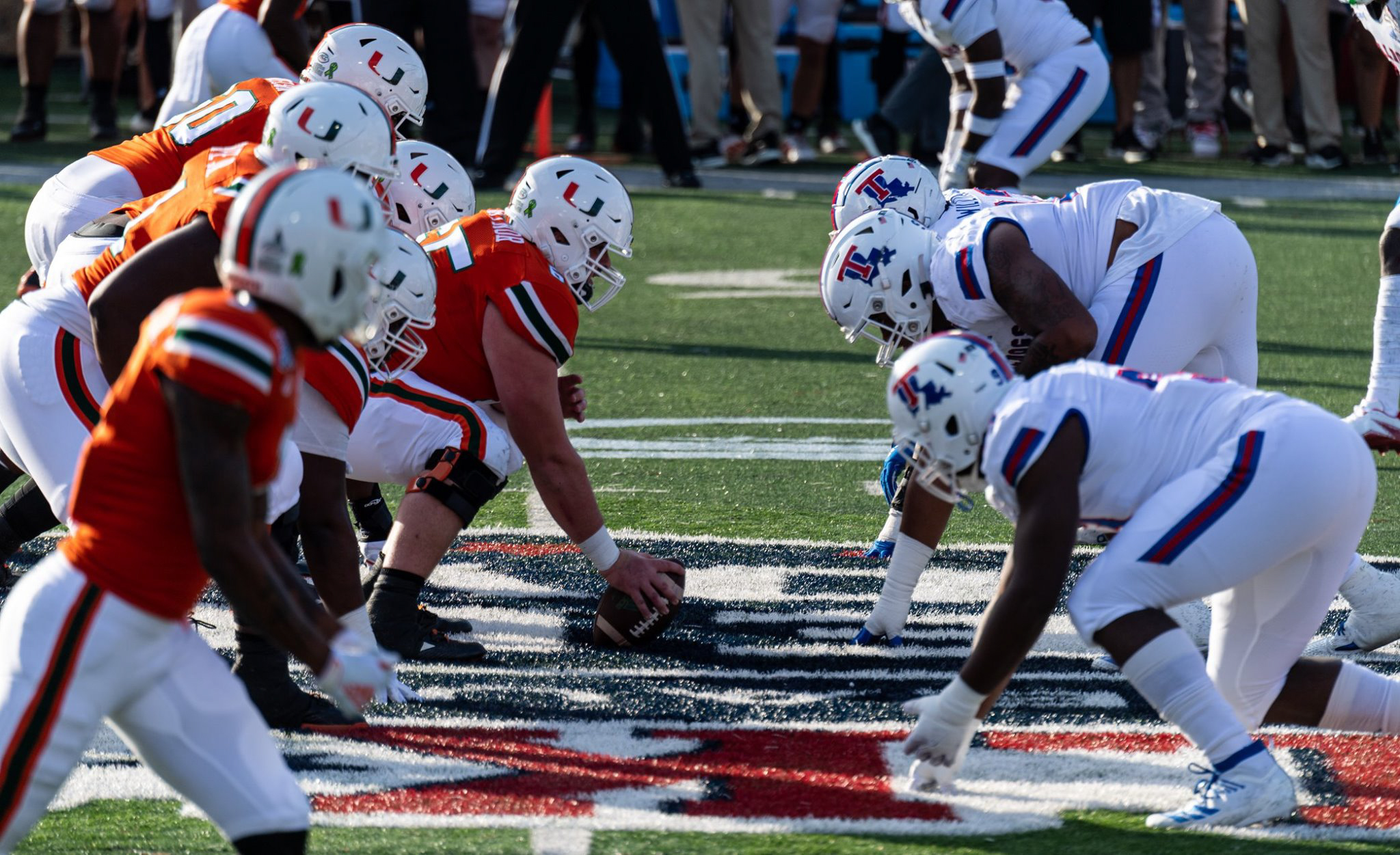
Louisiana Tech Bulldogs (in white) vs. Miami Hurricanes

Louisiana Tech's football team is currently coached by Sonny Cumbie and plays their home games at Joe Aillet Stadium with a capacity of 28,562. With a program dating to 1901, Tech would notch its first victory after a 6–0 win against LSU in 1904. The Bulldogs have compiled an all-time record of 642 wins, 492 losses, and 38 ties; won 25 conference championships and three Division II National Championships in 1972, 1973, and 1974.

Louisiana Tech has played in 13 Division I bowl games, most recently in the 2020 New Orleans Bowl. The Bulldogs have had many award winners throughout the years. Troy Edwards won the 1998 Fred Biletnikoff Award as the best wide receiver in college football. Tech punter Ryan Allen became the first player to win consecutive Ray Guy Awards by winning the award in 2011 and 2012. Also in 2012, quarterback Colby Cameron won the Sammy Baugh Trophy. Tech's rivals include Southern Miss, Louisiana-Monroe, and Louisiana. Notable football alumni include Terry Bradshaw, Phil Robertson, Willie Roaf, Fred Dean, Matt Stover, Josh Scobee, Luke McCown, Ryan Moats, and Tramon Williams.

=== Golf ===
Men's golf is coached by Steve Voltz, who became head coach in 2022. Squire Creek Country Club, a Tom Fazio-designed championship course that opened in 2002, is the home of Louisiana Tech golf. Golf Digest ranked Squire Creek as one of the top five private golf courses in the United States in 2004 and as the No. 1 golf course in Louisiana in 2019. La Tech hosts the annual Jim Rivers Intercollegiate.

=== Soccer ===
The Louisiana Tech women's soccer team has played at the varsity level since 2004. The Lady Techsters are coached by Steve Voltz, who took over the program in 2021. In 2009, Louisiana Tech opened the Lady Techster Soccer Complex just south of Joe Aillet Stadium on campus in Ruston. Following the 2016 season, the Lady Techsters have recorded an all-time record of 118–105–26.

=== Softball ===
The Lady Techsters softball program was founded in 1980 with Barry Canterbury as the team's first head coach. Gary Blair, current head coach of the Texas A&M women's basketball team, took over as the team's head coach in 1981 while he was an assistant coach of the Lady Techsters women's basketball team and led the softball team to its first winning record in 1981.

The Lady Techsters have made three appearances in the Women's College World Series (1983, 1985, 1986) and ten NCAA Tournament appearances. The team also won the WAC Tournament title in 2008 and C-USA Tournament title in 2017.

The team plays their home games at the Lady Techster Softball Complex on the corner of Tech Drive and Alabama Street. Josh Taylor is the current head coach of the team.

=== Tennis ===
The women's tennis team is coached by Amanda Stone, who has led the program since 2016. On October 15, 2008, the Louisiana Tech Tennis Complex was christened with a Lady Techsters sweep of Grambling State in the inaugural match at the new facility.

=== Track and field ===
The men's and women's track and field teams are coached by Brian Johnson, who was hired in 2022. The Lady Techsters Indoor Track and Field team won WAC Championships in 2005, 2006, 2008, 2009, 2010, and 2011. The Lady Techsters Outdoor Track and Field team won seven straight WAC Championships from 2005 to 2011.

=== Volleyball ===
Women's volleyball is coached by Amber McCray and assisted by Jane Hays both who have been at Louisiana Tech since 2019. The Lady Techsters play their home matches at the Thomas Assembly Center.

== Former varsity sports ==
Louisiana Tech formerly competed in men's boxing and men's tennis, but discontinued those sports.

== Non-varsity sports ==
Louisiana Tech competes in 16 club sports including men's and women's powerlifting, NIFA flight team, men's soccer, softball, men's and women's rugby, women's lacrosse, equestrian, karate, water skiing, cycling, bass fishing, ultimate frisbee, inline hockey, and paintball. The men's and women's powerlifting team have won 19 and 15 National Championships, respectively. The Louisiana Tech NIFA flight team won the national title in 1973.

== Championship history ==
=== National titles (42) ===
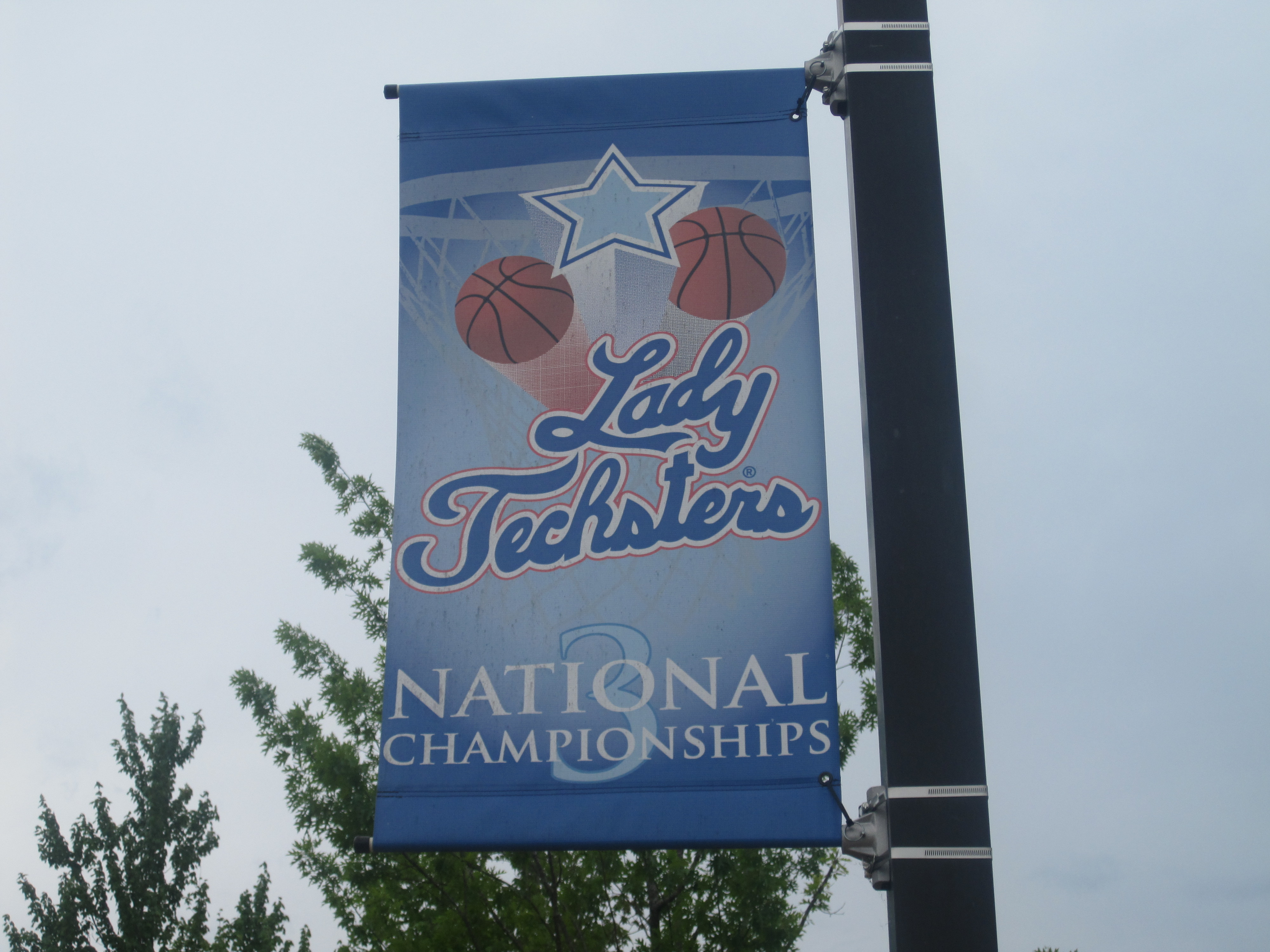
Lady Techsters 3 National Titles Banner

Football (3)
- 1972, 1973, 1974

Women's Basketball (3)
- 1981*, 1982, 1988

Men's Outdoor Track and Field (1)
- Shot Put: 1985 (John Campbell)

Men's Powerlifting** (19)
- 1978, 1985, 1986, 1994, 1995, 1996, 1997, 1998, 1999, 2000, 2001, 2002, 2003, 2004, 2005, 2006, 2008, 2010, 2017

Women's Powerlifting** (15)
- 1984, 1985, 1986, 1994, 1995, 1996, 1997, 1998, 1999, 2000, 2001, 2002, 2003, 2006, 2007

NIFA Flight Team** (1)
- 1973

*AIAW Championship
**Not an NCAA-sanctioned sport, but competed at the varsity level

=== Conference titles (164) ===
Football (25)
- 1915, 1921, 1941, 1945, 1947, 1949, 1952, 1953, 1955, 1957, 1958, 1959, 1960, 1964, 1969, 1971, 1972, 1973, 1974, 1977, 1978, 1982, 1984, 2001, 2011

Men's Basketball (31)
- Regular Season: 1910, 1927, 1928, 1934, 1942, 1946, 1947, 1948, 1953, 1955, 1959, 1964, 1967, 1970, 1971, 1976, 1985, 1987, 1988, 1990, 1992, 1999, 2013, 2014, 2015
- Tournament: 1984, 1985, 1987, 1988, 1989, 1991

Women's Basketball (36)
- Regular Season: 1988, 1989, 1990, 1993, 1994, 1995, 1996, 1997, 1998, 1999, 2000, 2001, 2002, 2003, 2004, 2005, 2006, 2007, 2009, 2011
- Tournament: 1988, 1989, 1990, 1991, 1994, 1996, 1997, 1998, 1999, 2000, 2001, 2002, 2003, 2004, 2006, 2010

Baseball (23)
- Regular Season: 1910, 1921, 1938, 1939, 1941, 1945, 1946, 1947, 1948, 1954, 1958, 1959, 1960, 1961, 1971, 1974, 1975, 1978, 1980, 1986, 1987
- Tournament: 1975, 1980, 2022

Softball (5)
- Regular Season: 2019, 2022
- Tournament: 2008, 2017, 2019

Men's Outdoor Track and Field (5)
- 1961, 1973, 1974, 1988, 1990

Men's Indoor Track and Field (2)
- 1988, 1999

Men's Cross Country (4)
- 1977, 1980, 1986, 1990

Women's Outdoor Track and Field (8)
- 1999, 2005, 2006, 2007, 2008, 2009, 2010, 2011

Women's Indoor Track and Field (7)
- 2000, 2005, 2006, 2008, 2009, 2010, 2011

Men's Golf (13)
- 1952, 1953, 1954, 1955, 1956, 1957, 1959, 1960, 1961, 1962, 1963, 1970, 1980, 2016

Men's Tennis (2)
- 1957, 1962

Women's Tennis (2)
- 1980, 1986

=== Conference Division titles (9) ===
Football (2)
- 2014, 2016
Baseball (5)
- 1980, 1982, 1987, 1992, 2021
Softball (2)
- 2017, 2019

== Athletic facilities ==
=== Current facilities ===
Louisiana Tech sports venues

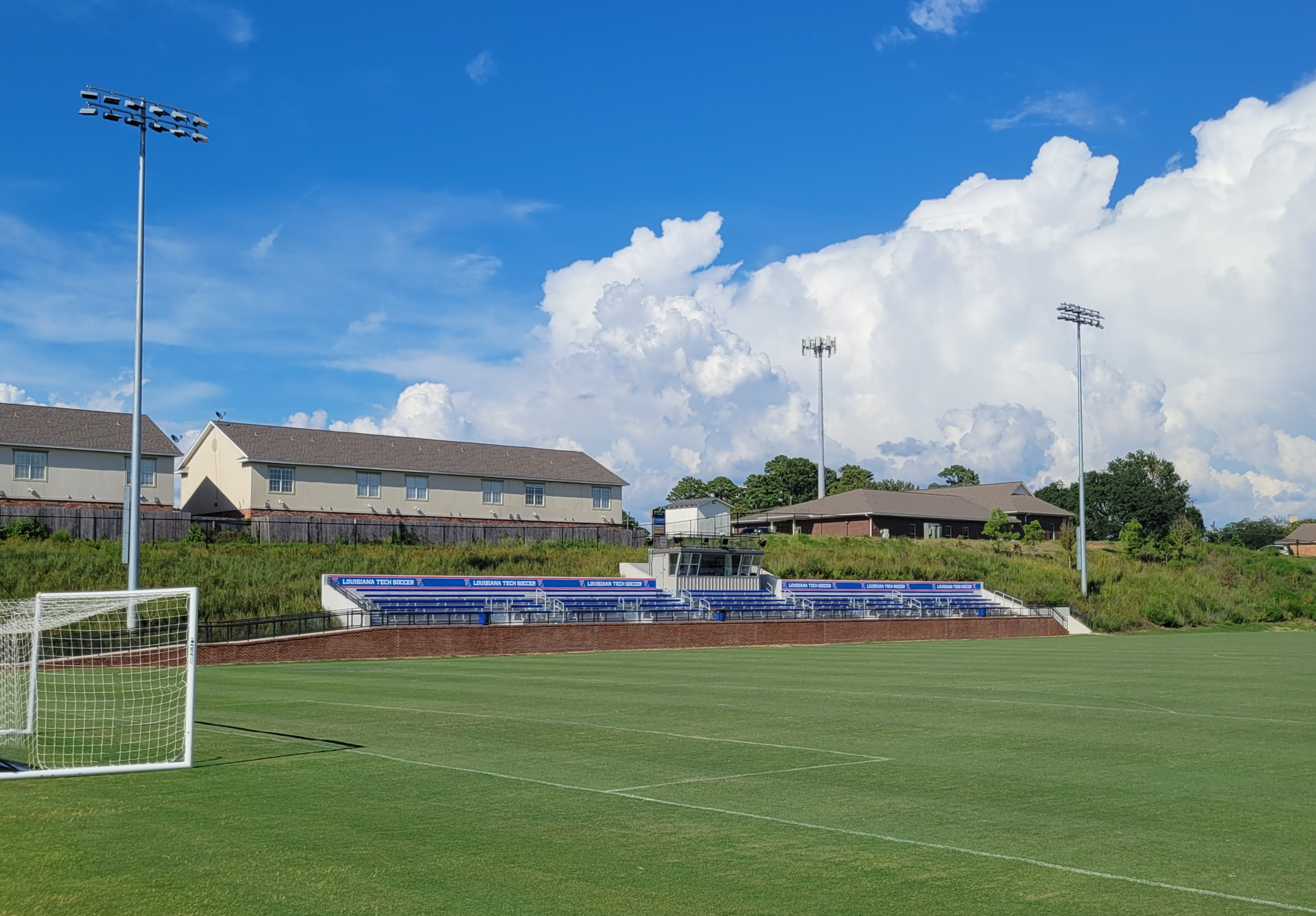
Robert Mack Field (soccer)

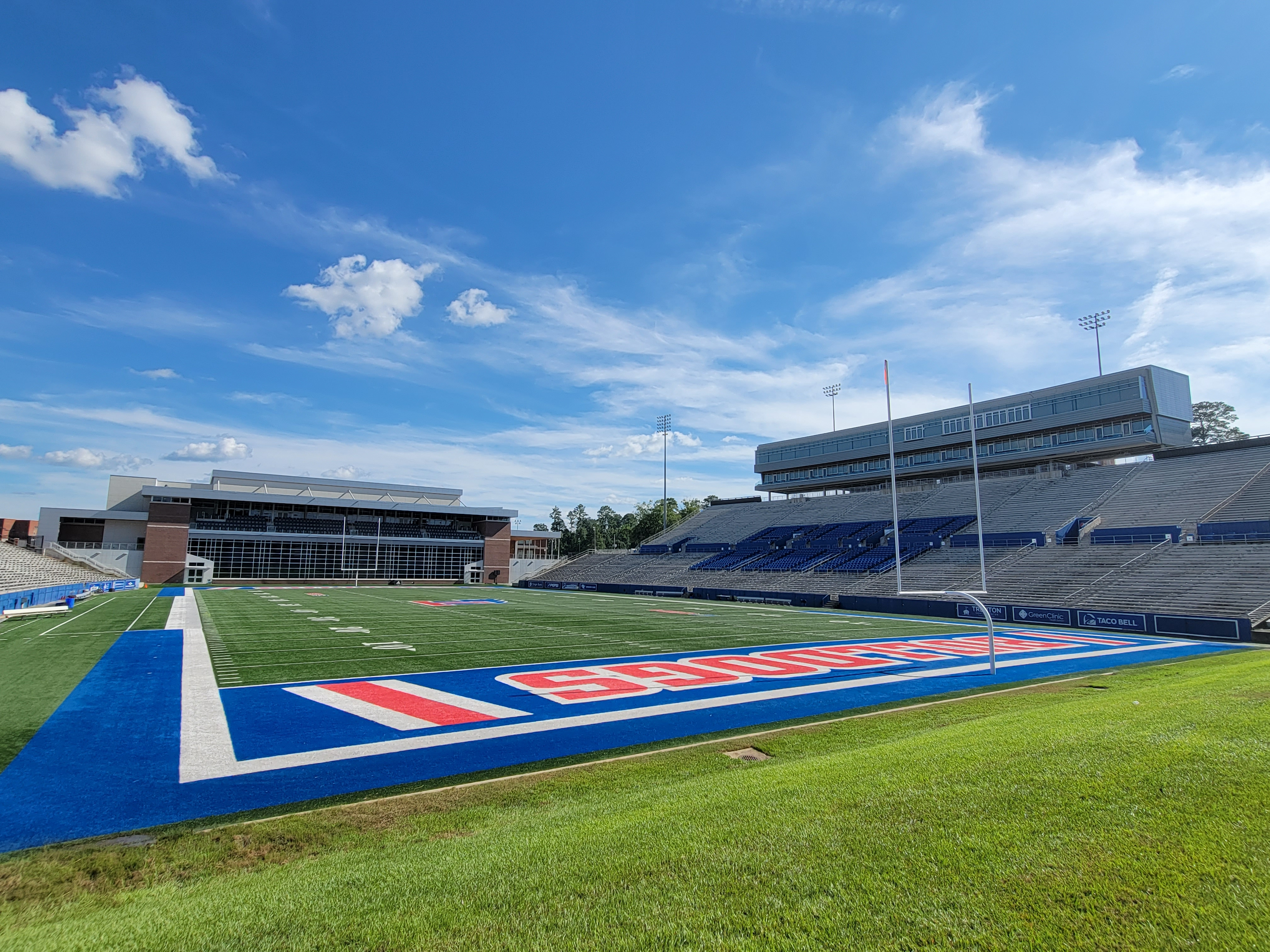
Joe Aillet Stadium (football)

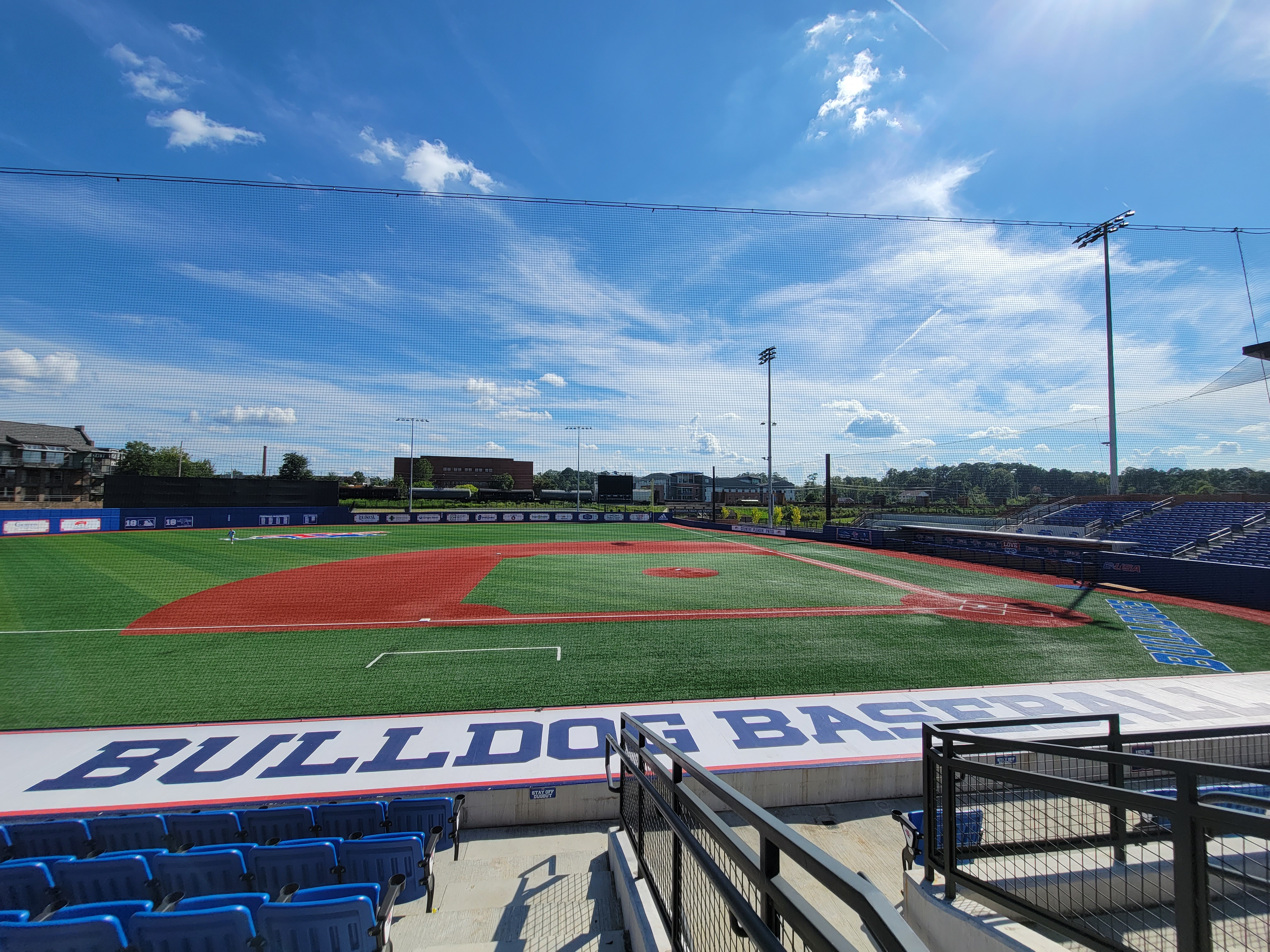
J. C. Love Field (baseball)

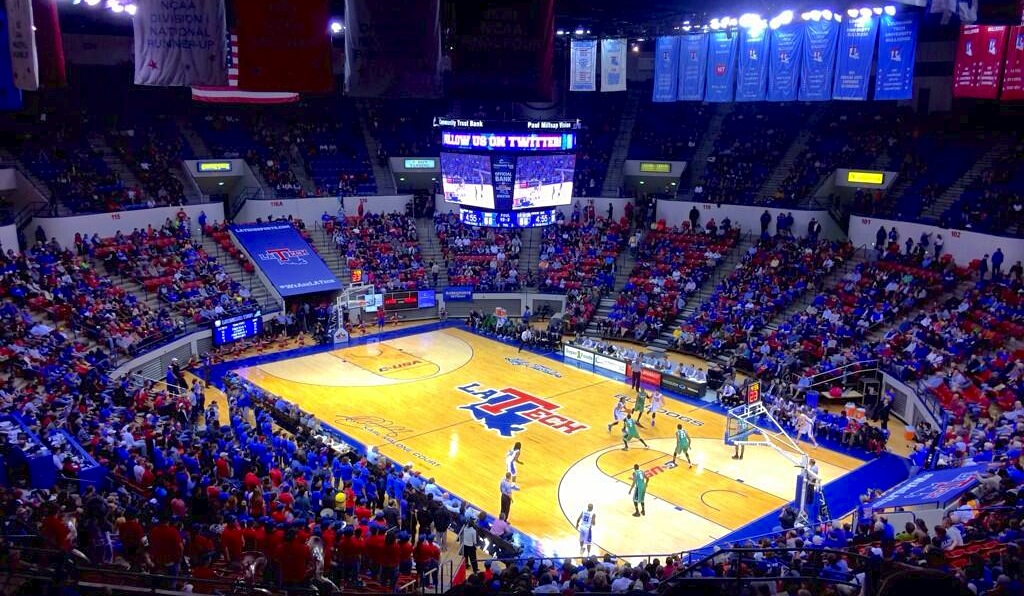
Thomas Assembly Center (basketball, volleyball)

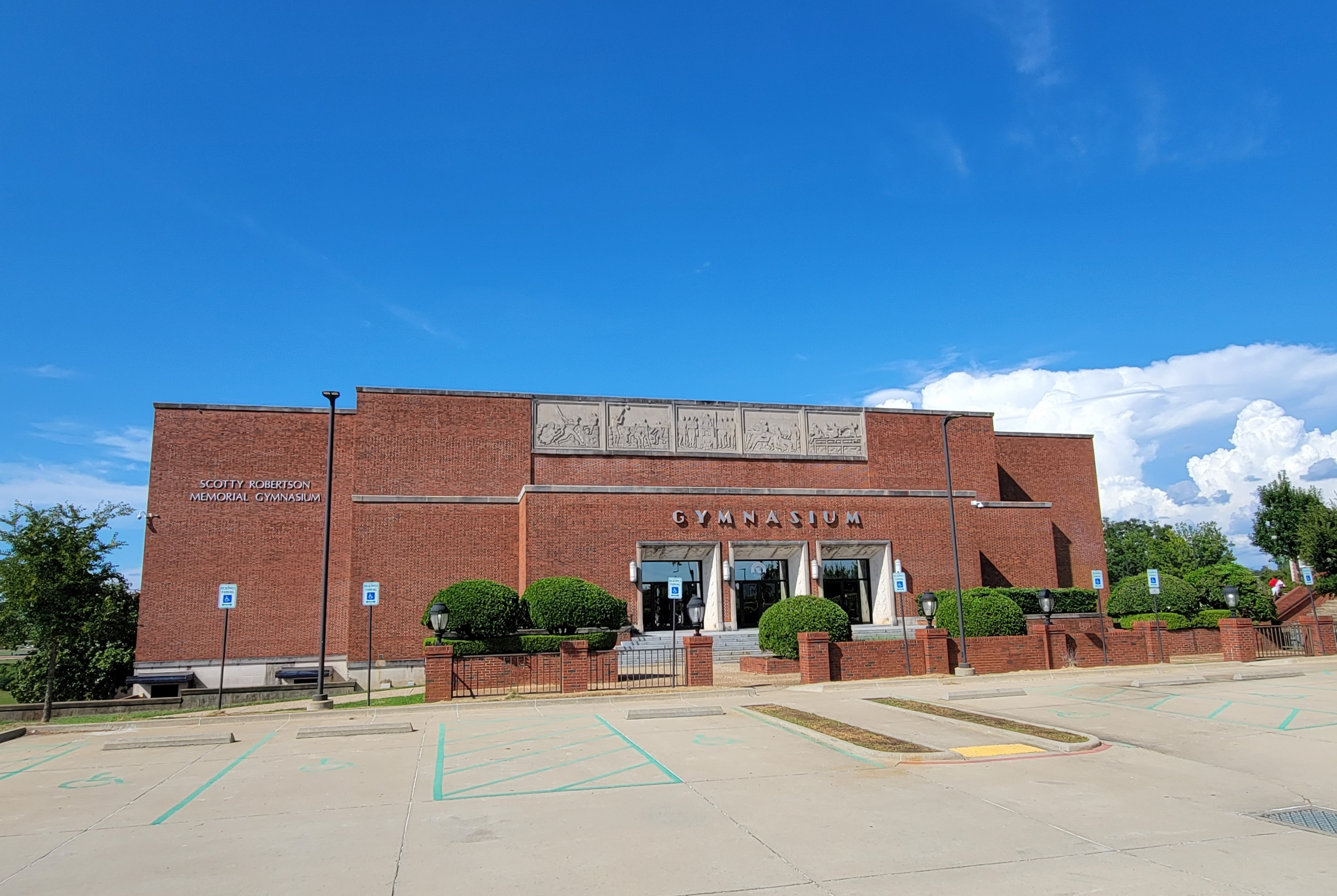
Memorial Gymnasium (basketball, former)

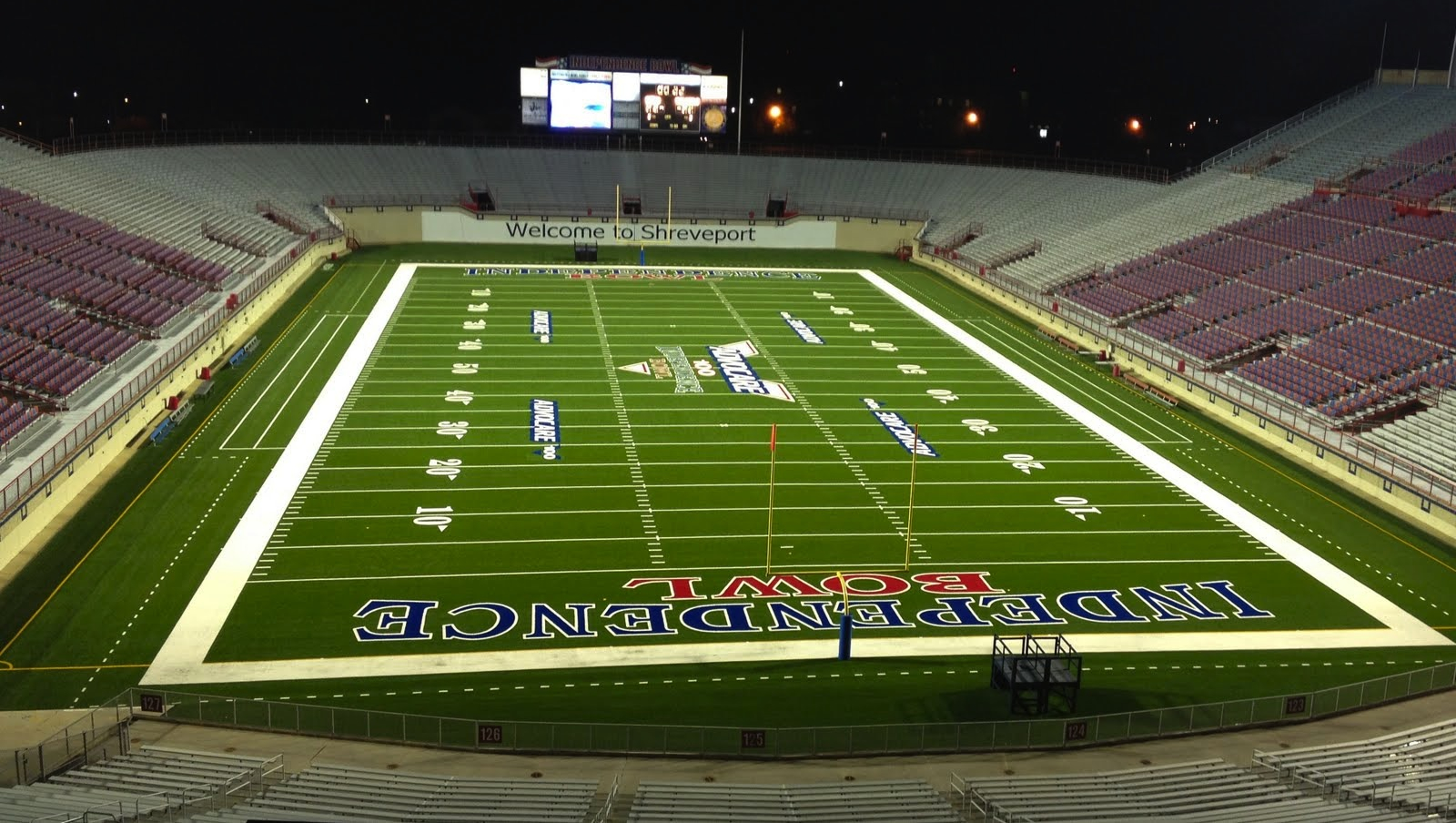
Independence Stadium (football, former)

- Basketball: Thomas Assembly Center
- Baseball: J. C. Love Field at Pat Patterson Park
- Bowling: Lambright Bowling Alley
- Cross Country: Tech Farm
- Football: Joe Aillet Stadium
- Golf: Squire Creek Country Club
- Soccer: Robert Mack Caruthers Field
- Softball: Dr. Billy Bundrick Field
- Tennis: Louisiana Tech Tennis Complex
- Track and Field: Jim Mize Track and Field Complex
- Volleyball: Thomas Assembly Center

=== Practice facilities ===
- Basketball: Scotty Robertson Memorial Gymnasium

=== Regional alternate athletic venues and facilities ===
- Basketball: CenturyLink Center (Bossier City)
- Football: Independence Stadium (Shreveport)

=== Former facilities ===
- Men's basketball: Men's Gymnasium (1925–1952), Memorial Gymnasium (1952–1982)
- Women's basketball: Memorial Gymnasium (1974–1982)
- Cross Country: Lincoln Parish Park (2004–2013)
- Football: Louisiana Tech Athletic Field (1904–1928), Tech Stadium (1928–1967)

== Rivalries ==
In football, Louisiana Tech's traditional rival is the Southern Miss Golden Eagles, as the two teams compete in the Rivalry in Dixie which dates back to 1935. Southern Miss currently holds a 31–13 lead in the series. This became a conference rivalry in 2013 with Tech's entry into C-USA. Although Tech's arrival united them with fellow Louisiana school Tulane, a rivalry could not develop because the Green Wave had already announced their 2014 departure for the American Athletic Conference.

While in the WAC, Louisiana Tech's conference rival was the Fresno State Bulldogs as both Bulldog football teams competed in the annual Battle for the Bone. Fresno State held a 7–4 series lead in WAC play, but the rivalry ended with Fresno State's 2012 move to the Mountain West and Tech's move to C-USA.

Louisiana Tech had a historical rivalry with the Northwestern State Demons as both teams used to play in the annual State Fair Game in Shreveport, Louisiana. However, Tech sacrificed this rivalry seeking greater national prominence for their programs by moving back to Division I-A.

The Lady Techsters basketball team's rivals include the Tennessee Lady Vols, LSU Tigers, WKU Lady Toppers, and Fresno State Bulldogs.

== Notable athletes and coaches ==
Notable former student-athletes and coaches at Louisiana Tech include:

- Trace Adkins
- Joe Aillet
- Leon Barmore
- Terry Bradshaw
- Janice Lawrence Braxton
- Jason Morgan (discus thrower)
- Billy Brewer
- P.J. Brown
- Pete Carmichael Jr.
- Roger Carr
- Gary Crowton
- Fred Dean
- Derek Dooley
- Matt Dunigan
- Sonny Dykes
- Troy Edwards
- Chuck Finley
- Tim Floyd
- Cheryl Ford
- Jimmy Johnson
- Vickie Johnson
- Betty Lennox
- Tony Levine
- Karl Malone
- Luke McCown
- Bronco Mendenhall
- Paul Millsap
- Rick Minter
- Ryan Moats
- Kim Mulkey
- Tim Rattay
- Willie Roaf
- Phil Robertson
- Scotty Robertson
- David Segui
- Josh Scobee
- Matt Stover
- Pat Tilley
- Teresa Weatherspoon
- Mike White
- Tramon Williams

=== Olympians ===
Louisiana Tech has produced ten known Olympians, five of whom are basketball players, four of whom are track and field athletes, and one of whom is a baseball player. Tech's Olympians have won a combined total of six gold medals and one bronze medal.

Athlete	Country	Games	Event	Result
Ayanna Alexander	Trinidad and Tobago	London 2012	Women's triple jump	14th
Mark Doubleday	Australia	Atlanta 1996	Baseball	7th
Chelsea Hayes	United States	London 2012	Women's long jump	16th
Venus Lacy	United States	Atlanta 1996	Women's basketball	1st
Janice Lawrence	United States	Los Angeles 1984	Women's basketball	1st
Karl Malone	United States	Barcelona 1992	Men's basketball	1st
Karl Malone	United States	Atlanta 1996	Men's basketball	1st
Olivia McKoy	Jamaica	Sydney 2000	Women's javelin throw	21st
Olivia McKoy	Jamaica	Beijing 2008	Women's javelin throw	34th
Jason Morgan	Jamaica	London 2012	Men's discus throw	39th
Kim Mulkey	United States	Los Angeles 1984	Women's basketball	1st
Teresa Weatherspoon	United States	Seoul 1988	Women's basketball	1st
Teresa Weatherspoon	United States	Barcelona 1992	Women's basketball	3rd

== Athletic directors ==
Name	Tenure
Eddie McLane	1939
Joe Aillet	1940–1970
Maxie Lambright	1971–1978
Larry Beightol	1979
Butch Henry	1979–1980
Alan Jones	1980
Charles Bussey	1981–1983
Bob Vanatta	1983–1986
Paul A. Miller	1986–1990
Jerry Stovall	1990–1993
Jim Oakes	1994–2008
Derek Dooley	2008–2010
Bruce Van De Velde	2010–2013
Tommy McClelland	2013–2020
Eric A. Wood	2020–2024
Ryan Ivey	2024-present

== See also ==
- List of NCAA Division I institutions
