= Meghan Addy =

American sprinter

Personal information
- Born: May 22, 1978 (age 48)
Medal record
Women's athletics
Representing the United States
World Indoor Championships
| Bronze medal – third place | 2003 Birmingham | 4×400 m relay |

Meghan Addy (born 22 May 1978) is an American athlete who mainly competes in the 400 metres.

At the World Indoor Championships in Athletics 2004, Addy was part of the US team which finished third in the 4 x 400 metres relay.

== Personal bests ==
=== Outdoor ===
- 400 metres: 53.70 seconds (2002)
- 400 metres hurdles: 55.70 seconds (2004)

=== Indoor ===
- 400 metres: 53.88 seconds (2003)
