= Natalya Nazarova =

Russian sprinter (born 1979)

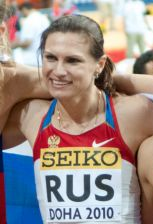
- Nazarova at the 2010 World Indoor Championships in Doha.

Personal information
- Born: May 26, 1979 (age 47) Moscow
- Height: 1.71 m (5 ft 7 1/2 in)
- Weight: 61 kg (134 lb)

Sport
- Country: Russia
- Sport: Women's athletics
- Event: 4 × 400 metres relay
Medal record
Olympic Games
Silver medal – second place	2004 Athens	4 × 400 m
Bronze medal – third place	2000 Sydney	4 × 400 m
Disqualified	2012 London	4 × 400 m
World Championships
Gold medal – first place	1999 Seville	4 × 400 m
Silver medal – second place	2003 Paris	4 × 400 m
Disqualified	2009 Berlin	4 × 400 m
World Indoor Championships
Gold medal – first place	1999 Maebashi	4 × 400 m
Gold medal – first place	2003 Birmingham	400 m
Gold medal – first place	2003 Birmingham	4 × 400 m
Gold medal – first place	2004 Budapest	400 m
Gold medal – first place	2004 Budapest	4 × 400 m
Gold medal – first place	2006 Moscow	4 × 400 m
Gold medal – first place	2008 Valencia	4 × 400 m
Silver medal – second place	2008 Valencia	400 m
Disqualified	2010 Doha	4 × 400 m

Natalya Viktorovna Nazarova (Russian: Наталья Викторовна Назарова, born May 26, 1979, Moscow) is a track and field sprinter.

== Biography ==
She was born in Moscow, USSR. Following a personal best time of 49.65 seconds run a fortnight earlier, Natalya had lost form by the start of the 2004 Summer Olympics in Athens, Greece, and only just made the final finishing 8th. She won a silver medal in the relay run and finished fourth at the 2003 World Championships.

On January 8, 2004, Natalya Nazarova broke the sixteen-year-old indoor world record for the rarely run 500 metres in a time of 1:07.36, that had been set by Olga Nazarova (no relation).

== Major achievements ==
- 1998
  - World Junior Championships - Annecy, France.
    - 400 m gold medal
    - 4 × 400 m relay silver medal
- 1999
  - World Championships - Seville, Spain.
    - 4 × 400 m relay gold medal
  - World Indoor Championships - Maebashi, Japan.
    - 4 × 400 m relay gold medal
- 2000
  - European Indoor Championships - Ghent, Belgium.
    - 400 m silver medal
- 2002
  - Russian Championships - Cheboksary.
    - 400 m silver medal
- 2003
  - World Championships - Paris, France.
    - 4 × 400 m relay silver medal
  - World Indoor Championships - Birmingham, England.
    - 400 m gold medal
    - 4 × 400 m relay gold medal
  - Russian Championships - Tula.
    - 400 m gold medal
  - Russian Indoor Championships
    - 400 m gold medal
- 2004
  - World Indoor Championships - Budapest, Hungary.
    - 400 m gold medal
    - 4 × 400 m relay gold medal in world record 3:23.88
  - Russian Championships - Tula.
    - 400 m gold medal
  - Russian Indoor Championships
    - 400 m gold medal in national record 49.68 s.
- 2006
  - World Indoor Championships - Moscow, Russia.
    - 4 × 400 m relay gold medal
