= Louisiana Tech Bulldogs and Lady Techsters track and field =

Louisiana Tech Bulldogs & Lady Techsters
- University: Louisiana Tech
- Head coach: Gary Stanley (29th season)
- Conference: Sun Belt
- Location: Ruston, Louisiana, US
- Outdoor track: Jim Mize Track and Field Complex
- Nickname: Bulldogs/Lady Techsters
- Colors: Blue and red

Conference Indoor Championships
- Men's: 1988, 1999; Women's: 2000, 2005, 2006, 2008, 2009, 2010, 2011

Conference Outdoor Championships
- Men's: 1961, 1973, 1974, 1988, 1990; Women's: 1999, 2005, 2006, 2007, 2008, 2009, 2010, 2011

The Louisiana Tech Bulldogs and Lady Techsters track and field team is the intercollegiate track and field program representing the Louisiana Tech University. The school competes in the Sun Belt Conference in Division I of the National Collegiate Athletic Association (NCAA).

== NCAA Championships ==
John Campbell won the shot put at the NCAA Division I Outdoor Track and Field Championships in 1985.

== Olympians ==
Name	Country	Olympiad	Event	Result
Ayanna Alexander	Trinidad and Tobago	London 2012	Women's triple jump	14th
Chelsea Hayes	United States	London 2012	Women's long jump	16th
Olivia McKoy	Jamaica	Sydney 2000	Women's javelin throw	21st
Olivia McKoy	Jamaica	Beijing 2008	Women's javelin throw	34th
Jason Morgan	Jamaica	London 2012	Men's discus throw	39th

== World championships ==
Name	Country	World Championships	Event	Result
Jaquvis Hart	United States	2015 IPC Athletics World Championships	Men's 400 meters	1st
