= Chrysoula Goudenoudi =

Greek sprinter

Personal information
- Native name: Χρυσούλα Γκουντενούδη
- Nationality: Greek
- Born: 28 March 1977 (age 48) Polykastro, Kilkis

Sport
- Sport: Sprinting
- Event: 4 × 400 metres relay

Chrysoula Goudenoudi (Greek: Χρυσούλα Γκουντενούδη; born 28 March 1977), also transliterated as Hrísoula or Khrysoula, is a Greek sprinter. She competed in the women's 4 × 400 metres relay at the 2004 Summer Olympics, along with Hariklia Bouda, Dimitra Dova, and Fani Halkia.
