= 2003 IAAF World Indoor Championships =

9th IAAF World Indoor Championships
- Dates: 14–16 March
- Host city: Birmingham, United Kingdom
- Venue: National Indoor Arena
- Events: 28
- Participation: 583 athletes from 131 nations

The 9th IAAF World Indoor Championships in Athletics were held in the National Indoor Arena in Birmingham, United Kingdom from 14 to 16 March 2003. It was the first time the Championships had been held in the UK. There were a total number of 589 participating athletes from 133 countries.

== Results ==
=== Men ===
1999 | 2001 | 2003 | 2004 | 2006

Event	Gold		Silver		Bronze	
60 m	Justin Gatlin; United States	6.46	Kim Collins; Saint Kitts and Nevis	6.53	Jason Gardener; Great Britain	6.55
200 m	Marlon Devonish; Great Britain	20.62	Joseph Batangdon; Cameroon	20.76	Dominic Demeritte; Bahamas	20.92
400 m	Tyree Washington; United States	45.34	Daniel Caines; Great Britain	45.43	Paul McKee; Ireland	45.99
400 m	Tyree Washington; United States	45.34	Daniel Caines; Great Britain	45.43	Jamie Baulch; Great Britain	45.99
800 m	David Krummenacker; United States	1:45.69	Wilson Kipketer; Denmark	1:45.87	Wilfred Bungei; Kenya	1:46.54
1500 m	Driss Maazouzi; France	3:42.59	Bernard Lagat; Kenya	3:42.62	Abdelkader Hachlaf; Morocco	3:42.71
3000 m	Haile Gebrselassie; Ethiopia	7:40.97	Alberto García; Spain	7:42.08	Luke Kipkosgei; Kenya	7:42.56
60 m hurdles	Allen Johnson; United States	7.47	Anier García; Cuba	7.49	Liu Xiang; China	7.52
4 × 400 m relay	Jamaica (JAM); Leroy Colquhoun; Danny McFarlane; Michael Blackwood; Davian Clarke; Kemel Thompson*	3:04.21^{1} (NR)	Great Britain (GBR); Jamie Baulch; Timothy Benjamin; Cori Henry; Daniel Caines; Mark Hylton*; Jared Deacon*	3:06.12	Poland (POL); Rafał Wieruszewski; Grzegorz Zajączkowski; Marcin Marciniszyn; Marek Plawgo; Artur Gąsiewski*; Piotr Rysiukiewicz*	3:06.61
High jump	Stefan Holm; Sweden	2.35	Yaroslav Rybakov; Russia	2.33	Gennadiy Moroz; Belarus	2.30
Pole vault	Tim Lobinger; Germany	5.80	Michael Stolle; Germany	5.75	Rens Blom; Netherlands	5.75 (NR)
Long jump	Dwight Phillips; United States	8.29	Yago Lamela; Spain	8.28	Miguel Pate; United States	8.21
Triple jump	Christian Olsson; Sweden	17.70	Walter Davis; United States	17.35	Yoelbi Quesada; Cuba	17.27
Shot put	Manuel Martínez; Spain	21.24	John Godina; United States	21.23	Yuriy Bilonog; Ukraine	21.13
Heptathlon	Tom Pappas; United States	6361	Lev Lobodin; Russia	6297	Roman Šebrle; Czech Republic	6196

^{1} The United States (James Davis, Jerome Young, Milton Campbell, and Tyree Washington; Derrick Brew ran in the heats) originally won gold in 3:04.09, but were disqualified after Young tested positive for steroids in 2004.

=== Women ===
1999 | 2001 | 2003 | 2004 | 2006

Event	Gold		Silver		Bronze	
60 m	Angela Williams; United States ^{1}	7.16	Torri Edwards; United States	7.17	Merlene Ottey; Slovenia	7.20
200 m	Muriel Hurtis; France ^{2}	22.54	Anastasiya Kapachinskaya; Russia	22.80	Juliet Campbell; Jamaica	22.81
400 m	Natalya Nazarova; Russia	50.83	Christine Amertil; Bahamas	51.11	Grit Breuer; Germany	51.13
800 m	Maria Mutola; Mozambique	1:58.94	Stephanie Graf; Austria	1:59.39	Mayte Martínez; Spain	1:59.53
1500 m	Regina Jacobs; United States	4:01.76	Kelly Holmes; Great Britain	4:02.66	Yekaterina Rozenberg; Russia	4:02.80
3000 m	Berhane Adere; Ethiopia	8:40.25	Marta Domínguez; Spain	8:42.12	Meseret Defar; Ethiopia	8:42.58
60 m hurdles	Gail Devers; United States	7.81	Glory Alozie; Spain	7.90	Melissa Morrison; United States	7.92
4 × 400 m relay	Russia (RUS); Natalya Antyukh; Yuliya Pechonkina; Olesya Zykina; Natalya Nazarova	3:28.45	Jamaica (JAM); Ronetta Smith; Catherine Scott; Sheryl Morgan; Sandie Richards	3:31.23	United States (USA); Monique Hennagan; Meghan Addy; Brenda Taylor; Mary Danner	3:31.69
High jump	Kajsa Bergqvist; Sweden	2.01	Yelena Yelesina; Russia	1.99	Anna Chicherova; Russia	1.99
Pole vault	Svetlana Feofanova; Russia	4.80 (WR)	Yelena Isinbayeva; Russia	4.60	Monika Pyrek; Poland	4.45
Long jump	Tatyana Kotova; Russia	6.84	Inessa Kravets; Ukraine	6.72	Maurren Maggi; Brazil	6.70
Triple jump	Ashia Hansen; Great Britain	15.01	Françoise Mbango Etone; Cameroon	14.88 (NR)	Kéné Ndoye; Senegal	14.72
Shot put	Irina Korzhanenko; Russia	20.55	Nadzeya Astapchuk; Belarus	20.31	Astrid Kumbernuss; Germany	19.86
Pentathlon	Carolina Klüft; Sweden	4933	Natalya Sazanovich; Belarus	4715	Marie Collonvillé; France	4644

^{1} Zhanna Block of Ukraine originally won the 60 m in 7.04, but was disqualified in 2011 for doping offences.
^{2} Michelle Collins of the USA originally won the 200 m in 22.18, but was disqualified in 2005 due to the BALCO scandal.

== Medal table ==
Rank	Nation	Gold	Silver	Bronze	Total
1	United States (USA)	9	3	3	15
2	Russia (RUS)	5	5	2	12
3	Sweden (SWE)	4	0	0	4
4	Great Britain (GBR)	2	3	2	7
5	Ethiopia (ETH)	2	0	1	3
5	France (FRA)	2	0	1	3
7	Spain (ESP)	1	4	1	6
8	Germany (GER)	1	1	2	4
9	Jamaica (JAM)	1	1	1	3
10	Mozambique (MOZ)	1	0	0	1
11	Belarus (BLR)	0	2	1	3
12	Cameroon (CMR)	0	2	0	2
13	Kenya (KEN)	0	1	2	3
14	Bahamas (BAH)	0	1	1	2
14	Cuba (CUB)	0	1	1	2
14	Ukraine (UKR)	0	1	1	2
17	Austria (AUT)	0	1	0	1
17	Denmark (DEN)	0	1	0	1
17	Saint Kitts and Nevis (SKN)	0	1	0	1
20	Poland (POL)	0	0	2	2
21	Brazil (BRA)	0	0	1	1
21	China (CHN)	0	0	1	1
21	Czech Republic (CZE)	0	0	1	1
21	Ireland (IRL)	0	0	1	1
21	Morocco (MAR)	0	0	1	1
21	Netherlands (NED)	0	0	1	1
21	Senegal (SEN)	0	0	1	1
21	Slovenia (SVN)	0	0	1	1
Totals (28 entries)		28	28	29	85

== Participating nations ==
- Albania (2)
- Algeria (4)
- Antigua and Barbuda (1)
- Armenia (1)
- Aruba (1)
- Australia (5)
- Austria (7)
- Azerbaijan (1)
- Bahamas (10)
- Bahrain (1)
- Barbados (1)
- Belarus (9)
- Belgium (2)
- Bolivia (1)
- Botswana (2)
- Brazil (9)
- Bulgaria (4)
- Burkina Faso (1)
- Cameroon (3)
- Canada (7)
- Cape Verde (1)
- Cayman Islands (1)
- Chad (1)
- Chile (1)
- China (10)
- Chinese Taipei (1)
- Comoros (2)
- Ivory Coast (1)
- Croatia (3)
- Cuba (11)
- Cyprus (1)
- Czech Republic (9)
- Denmark (3)
- Egypt (1)
- Estonia (2)
- Ethiopia (5)
- Finland (5)
- France (23)
- Georgia (1)
- Germany (10)
- Ghana (2)
- Great Britain (34)
- Greece (10)
- Grenada (1)
- Guatemala (1)
- Guyana (1)
- Haiti (2)
- Hong Kong (1)
- Hungary (7)
- Iceland (2)
- India (1)
- Indonesia (1)
- Ireland (10)
- Israel (1)
- Italy (19)
- Jamaica (20)
- Japan (3)
- Kazakhstan (2)
- Kenya (6)
- Kuwait (1)
- Kyrgyzstan (1)
- Latvia (2)
- Lebanon (1)
- Liberia (1)
- Lithuania (1)
- Macau (1)
- Madagascar (1)
- Malawi (1)
- Malaysia (1)
- Mali (1)
- Maldives (1)
- Malta (2)
- Marshall Islands (1)
- Mauritius (1)
- Mexico (1)
- Moldova (1)
- Morocco (9)
- Mozambique (1)
- Namibia (1)
- Nauru (1)
- Netherlands (10)
- New Zealand (1)
- Nigeria (3)
- Northern Mariana Islands (1)
- Pakistan (1)
- Palestine (1)
- Panama (1)
- Papua New Guinea (1)
- Paraguay (1)
- Peru (1)
- Philippines (1)
- Poland (15)
- Portugal (7)
- Puerto Rico (1)
- Republic of the Congo (1)
- Romania (11)
- Russia (42)
- Saint Kitts and Nevis (1)
- Saint Vincent and the Grenadines (1)
- El Salvador (1)
- Samoa (1)
- San Marino (1)
- São Tomé and Príncipe (1)
- Saudi Arabia (1)
- Senegal (2)
- Serbia and Montenegro (2)
- Slovakia (2)
- Slovenia (10)
- Solomon Islands (1)
- South Africa (4)
- Spain (27)
- Sri Lanka (2)
- Suriname (1)
- Swaziland (1)
- Sweden (12)
- Switzerland (3)
- Tajikistan (1)
- Tanzania (1)
- Thailand (1)
- Togo (1)
- Trinidad and Tobago (2)
- Tunisia (4)
- Turkey (2)
- Turkmenistan (1)
- Uganda (1)
- Ukraine (24)
- United States (49)
- United States Virgin Islands (1)
- Uruguay (1)
- Uzbekistan (1)
- Zambia (1)

== See also ==
- 2003 in athletics (track and field)
