= Olesya Zykina =

Russian sprinter

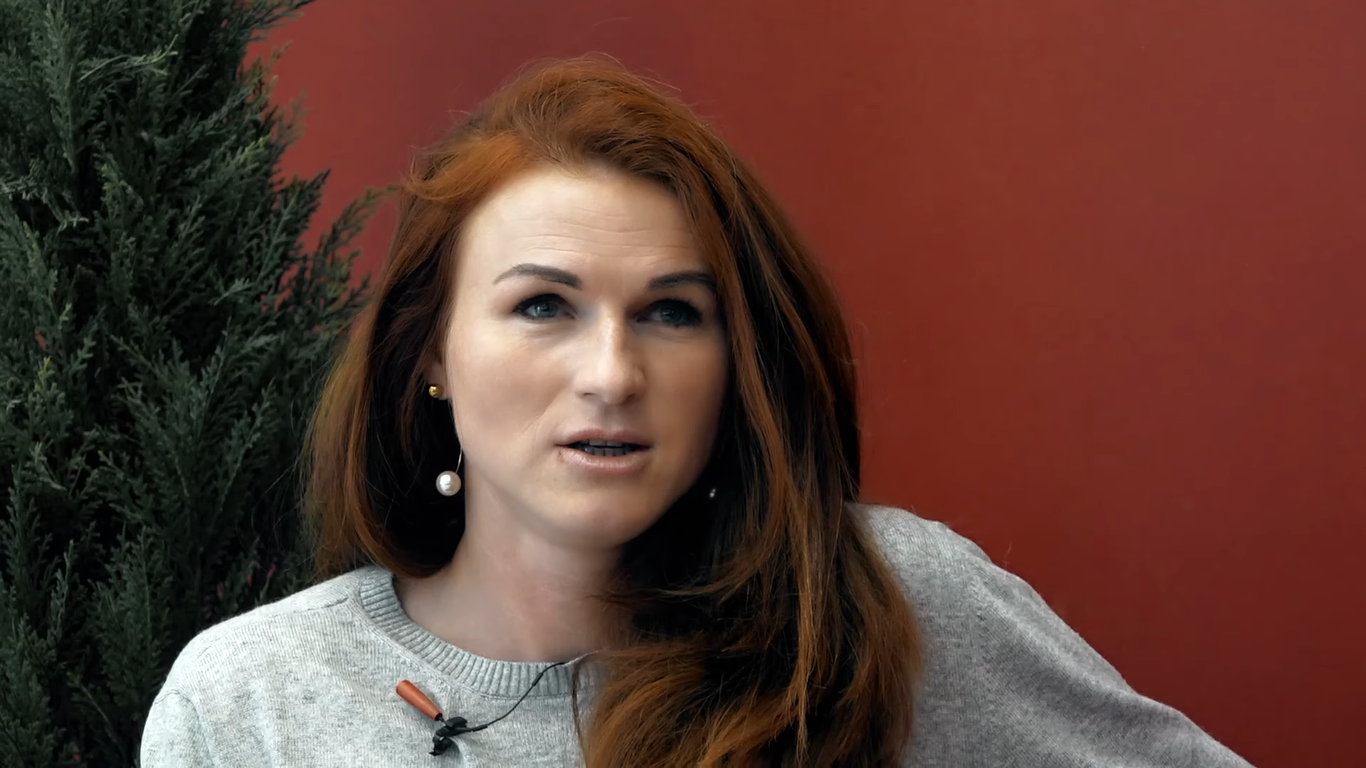

Personal information
- Born: October 7, 1980 (age 45) Kaluga, Russian SFSR, Soviet Union

Sport
- Country: Russia
- Sport: Women's athletics
Medal record
Olympic Games
Bronze medal – third place	2000 Sydney	4 × 400 m relay
Silver medal – second place	2004 Athens	4 × 400 m relay
World Championships
Silver medal – second place	2003 Paris	4 × 400 m relay
Bronze medal – third place	2001 Edmonton	4 × 400 m relay
World Indoor Championships
Gold medal – first place	2008 Valencia	400 m
Gold medal – first place	2008 Valencia	4 × 400 m relay
Bronze medal – third place	2001 Lisboa	400 m

Olesya Nikolaevna Zykina (Russian: Олеся Николаевна Зыкина, born October 7, 1980, in Kaluga) is a Russian athlete who mainly competes in the 400 metres. In addition to winning medals in individual contests, she has been a very successful relay runner, winning the silver medal at the 2004 Olympics.

== International competitions ==
Representing Russia
Year	Competition	Venue	Position	Event	Time	Notes
1998	World Junior Championships	Annecy, France	8th	100 m	11.88	wind: +1.7 m/s
1998	World Junior Championships	Annecy, France	2nd	4 × 400 m relay	3:32.35	
2001	World Indoor Championships	Lisbon, Portugal	3rd	400 m	51.71	
2001	World Indoor Championships	Lisbon, Portugal	1st	4 × 400 m relay	3:30.00	
2001	World Championships	Edmonton, Canada	6th	400 m	50.93	
2001	World Championships	Edmonton, Canada	3rd	4 × 400 m relay	3:24.92	
2002	European Championships	Munich, Germany	1st	400 m	50.45	
2002	European Championships	Munich, Germany	2nd	4 × 400 m relay	3:25.59	
2002	World Cup	Madrid, Spain	3rd	400 m	50.67	
2003	World Indoor Championships	Birmingham, United Kingdom	1st	4 × 400 m relay	3:28.45	
2003	World Championships	Paris, France	6th	400 m	50.59	
2003	World Championships	Paris, France	2nd	4 × 400 m relay	3:22.91	
2003	World Athletics Final	Monte Carlo, Monaco	5th	400 m	51.81	
2004	Summer Olympics	Athens, Greece	2nd	4 × 400 m relay	3:20.16	
2005	World Championships	Helsinki, Finland	6th	400 m	51.24	
2007	European Indoor Championships	Birmingham, United Kingdom	3rd	400 m	51.69	
2008	World Indoor Championships	Valencia, Spain	1st	400 m	51.09	
2008	World Indoor Championships	Valencia, Spain	1st	4 × 400 m relay	3:28.17	

== Personal bests ==
- 100 metres - 11.84 s (1998)
- 200 metres - 22.55 s (2005)
- 400 metres - 51.09 s (2008)
