= Olesya Forsheva =

Russian sprinter (born 1979)

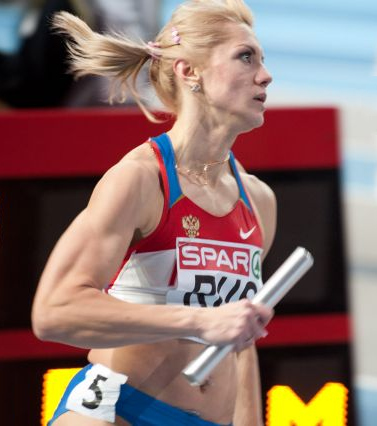
- Forsheva at the 2011 European Indoor Championships

Personal information
- Born: 8 July 1979 (age 47) Nizhny Tagil, Russia
- Height: 171 cm (5 ft 7 in)
- Weight: 60 kg (132 lb)

Sport
- Sport: Athletics
- Event: Sprints
- Club: Profsoyuzy

Achievements and titles
- Personal bests: 200 m: 23.09 (2005); 300 m: 36.30i (2006); 400 m: 50.04i (2006); 500 m: 1:06.31i (2006) Unofficial WR
Medal record
Representing Russia
Olympic Games
Silver medal – second place	2004 Athens	4 × 400 m relay
World Championships
Gold medal – first place	2005 Helsinki	4 × 400 m relay
World Indoor Championships
Gold medal – first place	2004 Budapest	4 × 400 m relay
Gold medal – first place	2006 Moscow	400 m
Gold medal – first place	2006 Moscow	4 × 400 m relay
Silver medal – second place	2004 Budapest	400 m
European Indoor Championships
Gold medal – first place	2011 Paris	4 × 400 m relay
Silver medal – second place	2011 Paris	400 m

Olesya Aleksandrovna Forsheva (Russian: Олеся Александровна Форшева (Красномовец), née Krasnomovets on 8 July 1979) is a retired Russian sprint runner who specialized in the 400 m and 4 × 400 m relay. She had her best achievements indoors, placing first or second in her both events at the world championships in 2004 and 2006 and at the European championships in 2011. Her 4 × 400 m teams set two world indoor records, in 2004 and 2006, but only the former one was ratified. Outdoors she won the world 4 × 400 m title in 2005 and placed second at the 2004 Olympics.

== Personal life ==
She is married to the fellow sprinter Dmitry Forshev.
