= Dimitra Dova =

Greek sprinter

Personal information
- Nationality: Greece
- Born: 2 July 1974 (age 51) Athens, Greece
- Height: 1.84 m (6 ft 1/2 in)
- Weight: 70 kg (154 lb)

Sport
- Sport: Athletics
- Event: Sprint
- Club: ASE Douka (GRE)

Achievements and titles
- Personal best(s): 200 m: 24.68 s (2008); 400 m: 51.89 s (2005)
Medal record
Women's athletics
Representing Greece
Mediterranean Games
Gold medal – first place	2005 Almería	400 m

Dimitra Dova (Greek: Δήμητρα Ντόβα; born July 2, 1974, in Athens) is a Greek sprinter, who specialized in the 400 metres. She won the gold medal for her category at the 2005 Mediterranean Games in Almería, Spain, with a time of 52.67 seconds, defeating her compatriot Phara Anacharsis by three hundredths of a second (0.03).

Dova represented the host nation Greece at the 2004 Summer Olympics, coincidentally in her home city, where she placed eighth for her national sprint team in the women's 4 × 400 m relay, with a time of 3:45.70.

At the 2008 Summer Olympics in Beijing, Dova competed for the women's 400 metres this time, as an individual athlete. She ran in the fifth heat against six other athletes, including American track star Sanya Richards, who eventually won a bronze medal in the final. She finished the race in fifth place by nine hundredths of a second (0.09) behind Japan's Asami Tanno, with a time of 52.69 seconds. Dova, however, failed to advance into the semi-finals, as she placed twenty-ninth overall and was ranked below three mandatory slots for the next round.
