= Shareese Woods =

American track and field athlete (born 1985)

Personal information
- Born: 20 February 1985 (age 41) Fort Bragg, North Carolina, U.S.

Sport
- Sport: Track and field
Medal record
Representing United States
Pan American Games
Silver medal – second place	2007 Rio de Janeiro	4x100m relay
World Indoor Championships
Bronze medal – third place	2008 Valencia	400m
Bronze medal – third place	2008 Valencia	4x400m relay

Shareese Woods (born February 20, 1985) is an American track and field athlete. She has competed internationally in sprint and has been on United States teams at the 2006 NACAC Under-23 Championships in Athletics, 2007 NACAC Championships, 2007 Pan American Games and 2008 IAAF World Indoor Championships, medaling at all of those competitions.

== Biography ==
An Army brat born in Fort Bragg, North Carolina, she attended both Lee County High School in Sanford, North Carolina and Prince George County High School, in Prince George, Virginia. During that time, she was a three-time regional champion, and two-time state champion in the 400m dash in a time of 55.00 seconds.

She went on to attend UNC Charlotte; receiving a B.A. in Mass Media Communications. She became the most decorated athlete in UNC Charlotte school history, owning four indoor records, five outdoor records, three indoor conference records, four outdoor conference records, and four NCAA Division I All-American awards. Notably, she also was recognized in Sports Illustrated "Faces in the Crowd".

Post-collegiately, Woods went on to run professionally, sponsored by Adidas. Her most notable accomplishments are 2008 USA Indoor 400m national champion, and two-time World Indoor 400m bronze medalist with a time of 51.41.

== Personal records ==
Event	Time	Place	Date
100 Meters	11.36	Orlando, Florida	03/27/2010
200 meters	22.71	Haldensleben, Germany	08/22/2010
400 meters	51.05	Eugene, Oregon	06/27/2009
200 meters indoor	22.97	Fayetteville, Arkansas	03/09/2007
400 meters indoor	51.41	Valencia, Spain	03/09/2008
