= Moushaumi Robinson =

American sprinter

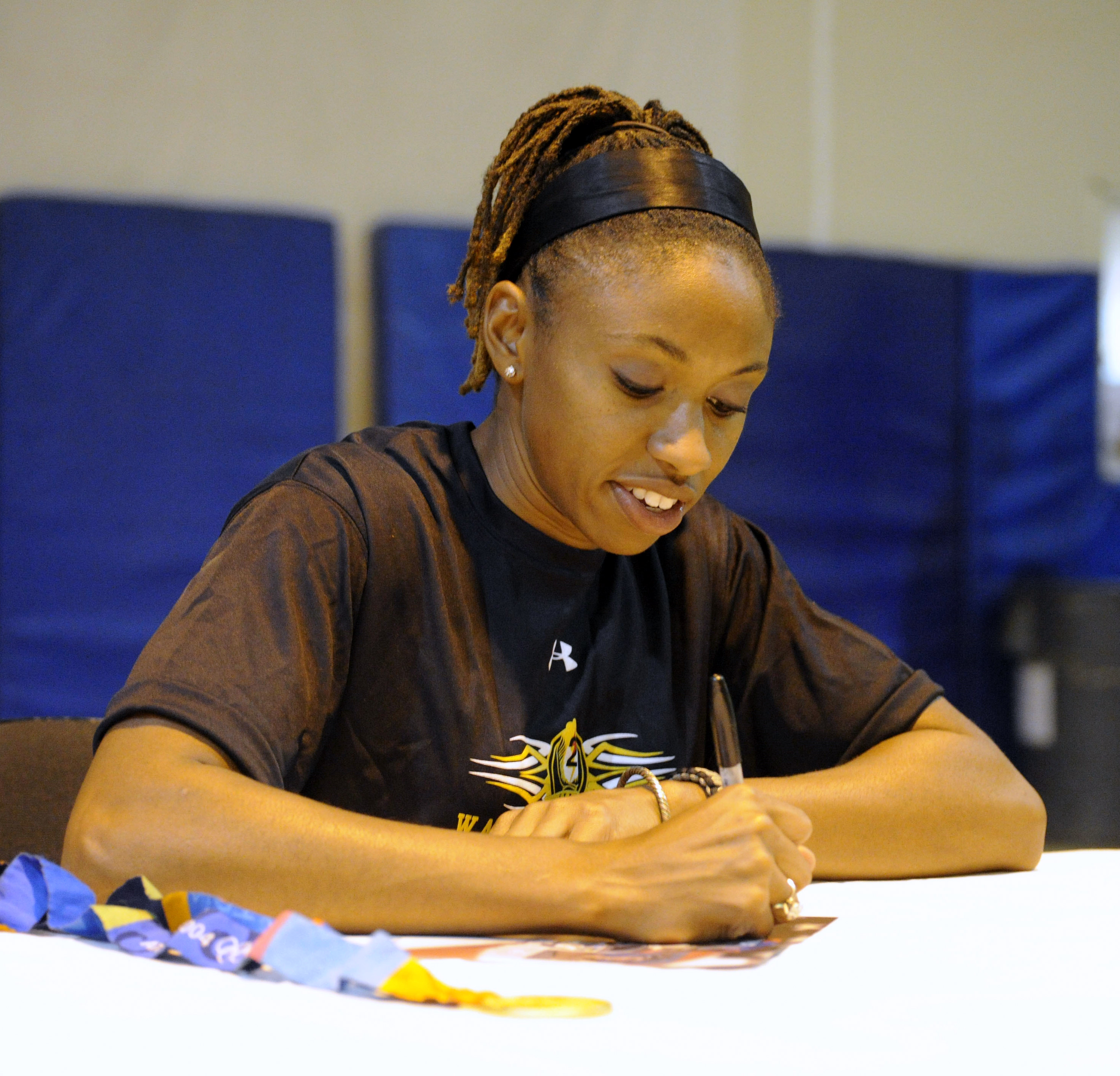

Personal information
- Born: April 13, 1981 (age 45) Hattiesburg, Mississippi, U.S.
Medal record
Women's athletics
Representing the United States
Olympic Games
Gold medal – first place	2004 Athens	4 × 400 metres relay
Pan American Games
Gold medal – first place	2003 Sto Domingo	4 × 400 metres relay

Moushaumi Robinson (born April 13, 1981, in Hattiesburg, Mississippi) is an American track and field athlete. She represented the United States at the 2004 Summer Olympics in Athens, where she won a gold medal in the 4 × 400 metres relay for her contributions in the preliminary round.

Competing for the Texas Longhorns women's track and field team, Robinson won the 2003 NCAA Division I Outdoor Track and Field Championships in the 4 × 400 m.
