= 2007 World Championships in Athletics – Women's 400 metres hurdles =

The women's 400 metres hurdles at the 2007 World Championships in Athletics was held at the Nagai Stadium on 27, 28 and 30 August.

== Medalists ==
Gold	Silver	Bronze
Jana Rawlinson; Australia	Yuliya Pechenkina; Russia	Anna Jesień; Poland

== Schedule ==
Date	Time	Round
August 27, 2007	10:50	Heats
August 28, 2007	21:40	Semifinals
August 30, 2007	20:25	Final

== Results ==
KEY:	q	Fastest non-qualifiers	Q	Qualified	WR	World record	AR	Area record	NR	National record	PB	Personal best	SB	Seasonal best

=== Heats ===
Qualification: First 4 in each heat (Q) and the next 4 fastest (q) advance to the semifinals.

Rank	Heat	Name	Nationality	Time	Notes
1	2	Tiffany Ross-Williams	United States	54.24	Q
2	1	Yuliya Pechenkina	Russia	54.50	Q
3	3	Tetiana Tereschuk-Antipova	Ukraine	54.74	Q, SB
4	4	Jana Rawlinson	Australia	54.77	Q
5	2	Anna Jesień	Poland	55.01	Q
6	1	Nickiesha Wilson	Jamaica	55.15	Q
7	3	Melaine Walker	Jamaica	55.40	Q
8	4	Natalia Ivanova	Russia	55.52	Q
9	5	Huang Xiaoxiao	China	55.64	Q
10	3	Fani Chalkia	Greece	55.66	Q, SB
11	1	Tasha Danvers-Smith	Great Britain	55.67	Q
12	4	Muna Jabir Adam	Sudan	55.80	Q
13	3	Zuzana Hejnová	Czech Republic	55.87	Q, SB
14	4	Ionela Târlea-Manolache	Romania	55.90	Q, SB
15	2	Tatyana Azarova	Kazakhstan	55.93	Q
15	4	Kaliese Spencer	Jamaica	55.93	q
17	1	Nicole Leach	United States	55.95	Q
18	5	Yevgeniya Isakova	Russia	56.02	Q
19	3	Erica Mårtensson	Sweden	56.19	q, PB
20	3	Yekaterina Bikert	Russia	56.23	q
21	5	Sheena Johnson	United States	56.30	Q
22	1	Hristína Hantzi-Neag	Greece	56.37	q
23	3	Élodie Ouédraogo	Belgium	56.44	
24	3	Ulrike Urbansky	Germany	56.76	
25	2	Tsvetelina Kirilova	Bulgaria	56.77	Q
26	1	Satomi Kubokura	Japan	57.01	
27	2	Aïssata Soulama	Burkina Faso	57.06	
28	3	Michelle Carey	Ireland	57.10	
29	5	Christina Kron	Germany	57.28	Q
30	2	Anastasiya Rabchenyuk	Ukraine	57.31	
31	2	Özge Gürler	Turkey	57.40	
32	1	Ilona Ranta	Finland	57.64	
33	5	Andrea Blackett	Barbados	57.70	
34	5	Lamiae Lhabze	Morocco	57.81	
35	5	Lucimar Teodoro	Brazil	58.32	
36	4	Muizat Ajoke Odumosu	Nigeria	59.05	
37	1	Nadia Nazir	Pakistan	1:04.76	PB

=== Semifinals ===
Qualification: First 2 in each semifinal (Q) and the next 2 fastest (q) advance to the final.

Rank	Heat	Name	Nationality	Time	Notes
1	1	Jana Rawlinson	Australia	53.57	Q
2	2	Yuliya Pechenkina	Russia	53.82	Q
3	3	Anna Jesień	Poland	53.86	Q, NR
4	3	Nickiesha Wilson	Jamaica	53.97	Q, PB
5	2	Huang Xiaoxiao	China	54.00	Q, PB
6	1	Tasha Danvers-Smith	Great Britain	54.08	Q, SB
7	1	Yevgeniya Isakova	Russia	54.11	q, SB
8	3	Tiffany Williams	United States	54.15	q
9	1	Tetiana Tereschuk-Antipova	Ukraine	54.38	SB
10	2	Melaine Walker	Jamaica	54.54	
11	1	Sheena Johnson	United States	54.55	
12	3	Natalya Ivanova	Russia	54.88	
13	1	Zuzana Hejnová	Czech Republic	55.04	NR
14	3	Ionela Târlea-Manolache	Romania	55.41	SB
15	3	Muna Jabir Adam	Sudan	55.65	
16	2	Tatyana Azarova	Kazakhstan	55.74	
17	3	Tsvetelina Kirilova	Bulgaria	56.03	PB
18	2	Christina Kron	Germany	56.05	
19	2	Nicole Leach	United States	56.10	
20	3	Hristina Hantzi-Neag	Greece	56.35	
21	1	Erica Mårtensson	Sweden	56.46	
22	2	Fani Chalkia	Greece	56.58	
23	1	Kaliese Spencer	Jamaica	56.69	
24	2	Yekaterina Bikert	Russia	1:00.07	

=== Final ===
Rank	Name	Nationality	Time	Notes
1st place, gold medalist(s)	Jana Rawlinson	Australia	53.31	SB
2nd place, silver medalist(s)	Yuliya Pechenkina	Russia	53.50	SB
3rd place, bronze medalist(s)	Anna Jesień	Poland	53.92	
4	Nickiesha Wilson	Jamaica	54.10	
5	Huang Xiaoxiao	China	54.15	
6	Yevgeniya Isakova	Russia	54.50	
7	Tiffany Williams	United States	54.63	
8	Tasha Danvers-Smith	Great Britain	54.94	
