= 2003 World Championships in Athletics – Women's 400 metres hurdles =

These are the official results of the Women's 400 metres hurdles event at the 2003 IAAF World Championships in Paris, France. There were a total number of 29 participating athletes, with four qualifying heats, two semi-finals and the final held on Thursday 2003-08-28 at 22:00h.

== Final ==
RANK	FINAL	TIME
	Jana Rawlinson (AUS)	53.22
	Sandra Glover (USA)	53.65
	Yuliya Pechonkina (RUS)	53.71
4.	Ionela Târlea (ROU)	54.41
5.	Tetiana Tereschuk-Antipova (UKR)	54.61
6.	Andrea Blackett (BAR)	54.79
7.	Heike Meissner (GER)	55.60
8.	Surita Febbraio (RSA)	55.90

== Semi-final ==
- Held on Monday 2003-08-25

RANK	HEAT 1	TIME
1.	Jana Rawlinson (AUS)	53.77
2.	Sandra Glover (USA)	53.90
3.	Tetiana Tereschuk-Antipova (UKR)	54.26
4.	Heike Meissner (GER)	55.00
5.	Natalya Torshina (KAZ)	55.24
6.	Joanna Hayes (USA)	55.35
7.	Tasha Danvers (GBR)	55.48
8.	Cora Olivero (ESP)	55.82

RANK	HEAT 2	TIME
1.	Yuliya Pechonkina (RUS)	53.57
2.	Ionela Târlea (ROU)	54.84
3.	Surita Febbraio (RSA)	55.18
4.	Andrea Blackett (BAR)	55.33
5.	Stephanie Kampf (GER)	55.35
6.	Allison Beckford (JAM)	55.76
7.	Małgorzata Pskit (POL)	56.21
—	Raasin McIntosh (USA)	DNF

== Heats ==
Held on Sunday 2003-08-25

RANK	HEAT 1	TIME
1.	Yuliya Pechonkina (RUS)	54.01
2.	Tetiana Tereschuk-Antipova (UKR)	55.28
3.	Joanna Hayes (USA)	56.10
4.	Androula Sialou (CYP)	56.11
5.	Rebecca Wardell (NZL)	56.51
6.	Monika Niederstatter (ITA)	56.62
7.	Salhate Djamaldine (COM)	58.91

RANK	HEAT 2	TIME
1.	Surita Febbraio (RSA)	55.41
2.	Heike Meissner (GER)	55.80
3.	Natalya Torshina (KAZ)	55.86
4.	Tasha Danvers (GBR)	56.02
5.	Andrea Blackett (BAR)	56.05
6.	Mame Tacko Diouf (SEN)	56.22
7.	Jessica Miller (URU)	1:01.03
8.	Diala El Chab (LIB)	1:02.90

RANK	HEAT 3	TIME
1.	Jana Rawlinson (AUS)	54.80
2.	Raasin McIntosh (USA)	55.53
3.	Stephanie Kampf (GER)	55.79
4.	Anna Jesień (POL)	56.07
5.	Ieva Zunda (LAT)	56.87
6.	Velveth Moreno (PAN)	1:03.55
—	Yvonne Harrison (PUR)	DNF

RANK	HEAT 4	TIME
1.	Sandra Glover (USA)	54.48
2.	Ionela Târlea (ROU)	54.98
3.	Małgorzata Pskit (POL)	55.18
4.	Allison Beckford (JAM)	55.75
5.	Cora Olivero (ESP)	55.95
6.	Makiko Yoshida (JPN)	57.08
7.	Aïssata Soulama (BUR)	1:01.86

== See also ==
- Athletics at the 2003 Pan American Games - Women's 400 metres hurdles
