= 2001 World Championships in Athletics – Women's 4 × 400 metres relay =

These are the official results of the Women's 4 × 400 metres event at the 2001 IAAF World Championships in Edmonton, Alberta, Canada.

== Medalists ==
Gold	Silver	Bronze
Jamaica; Sandie Richards; Catherine Scott; Debbie-Ann Parris; Lorraine Fenton; Michelle Burgher*; Deon Hemmings*	Germany; Florence Ekpo-Umoh; Shanta Ghosh; Claudia Marx; Grit Breuer	Russia; Irina Rosikhina; Yuliya Nosova; Anastasiya Kapachinskaya; Olesya Zykina; Natalya Shevtsova*

* Runners who participated in the heats only and received medals.

== Results ==
=== Heats ===
The first 3 of each heat (Q) plus the 2 fastest times (q) qualify.

Rank	Heat	Nation	Athletes	Time	Notes
1	1	United States	Demetria Washington, Michelle Collins, Mikele Barber, Suziann Reid	3:21.97	Q
2	1	Jamaica	Michelle Burgher, Catherine Scott, Deon Hemmings, Sandie Richards	3:24.87	Q, SB
3	1	Canada	Foy Williams, Samantha George, Danielle Kot, LaDonna Antoine	3:25.68	Q
4	2	Germany	Florence Ekpo-Umoh, Shanta Ghosh, Claudia Marx, Grit Breuer	3:26.81	Q
5	1	France	Francine Landre, Anita Mormand, Sylvanie Morandais, Marie-Louise Bévis	3:26.92	q
6	2	Great Britain	Lee McConnell, Lesley Owusu, Catherine Murphy, Donna Fraser	3:27.25	Q, SB
7	1	Poland	Aleksandra Pielużek, Grażyna Prokopek, Aneta Lemiesz, Małgorzata Pskit	3:27.37	q, SB
8	2	Russia	Natalya Shevtsova, Irina Rosikhina, Anastasiya Kapachinskaya, Olesya Zykina	3:27.39	Q
9	1	Cuba	Yudalis Diaz, Julia Duporty, Libania Grenot, Daimí Pernía	3:28.68	
10	2	Belarus	Natalya Safronnikova, Svetlana Usovich, Irina Khlyustova, Anna Kozak	3:28.93	
11	2	Senegal	Aïda Diop, Mame Tacko Diouf, Fatou Bintou Fall, Amy Mbacké Thiam	3:30.03	
12	1	Puerto Rico	Militza Castro, Yvonne Harrison, Sandra Moya, Yamelis Ortiz	3:30.81	NR
13	2	Japan	Miho Sugimori, Kazue Kakinuma, Sakie Nobuoka, Makiko Yoshida	3:33.51	
14	2	Spain	Julia Alba, Norfalia Carabalí, Miriam Bravo, Yolanda Reyes	3:33.78	SB

=== Final ===
Rank	Nation	Athletes	Time	Notes
1st place, gold medalist(s)	Jamaica	Sandie Richards, Catherine Scott, Debbie-Ann Parris, Lorraine Fenton	3:20.65	WL
2nd place, silver medalist(s)	Germany	Florence Ekpo-Umoh, Shanta Ghosh, Claudia Marx, Grit Breuer	3:21.97	SB
3rd place, bronze medalist(s)	Russia	Irina Rosikhina, Yuliya Nosova, Anastasiya Kapachinskaya, Olesya Zykina	3:24.92	
4	United States	Jearl Miles Clark, Monique Hennagan, Michelle Collins, Suziann Reid	3:26.88	
5	Great Britain	Lee McConnell, Helen Frost, Natasha Danvers, Catherine Murphy	3:26.94	SB
6	France	Francine Landre, Anita Mormand, Sylvanie Morandais, Marie-Louise Bévis	3:27.54	
7	Poland	Aleksandra Pielużek, Grażyna Prokopek, Aneta Lemiesz, Małgorzata Pskit	3:27.78	
8	Canada	Foy Williams, Samantha George, Danielle Kot, LaDonna Antoine	3:27.93	
