= 2001 World Championships in Athletics – Women's 400 metres hurdles =

These are the official results of the Women's 400 metres hurdles event at the 2001 IAAF World Championships in Edmonton, Alberta, Canada.

== Medalists ==
Gold	Nezha Bidouane; Morocco (MAR)
Silver	Yuliya Nosova; Russia (RUS)
Bronze	Daimí Pernía; Cuba (CUB)

== Results ==
=== Heats ===
Qualification: First 3 in each heat (Q) and the next 4 fastest (q) advanced to the semifinals.

Rank	Heat	Name	Nationality	Time	Notes
1	2	Yuliya Nosova	Russia	54.43	Q
2	1	Nezha Bidouane	Morocco	54.55	Q
3	1	Debbie-Ann Parris	Jamaica	54.81	Q
4	2	Tonja Buford-Bailey	United States	54.99	Q
5	3	Sandra Glover	United States	55.38	Q
6	4	Deon Hemmings	Jamaica	55.39	Q
7	3	Daimí Pernía	Cuba	55.40	Q
8	2	Ionela Târlea	Romania	55.41	Q
9	1	Małgorzata Pskit	Poland	55.45	Q
10	1	Yvonne Harrison	Puerto Rico	55.63	q, NR
11	1	Natalya Torshina	Kazakhstan	55.69	q
12	3	Monika Niederstatter	Italy	55.83	Q, SB
13	1	Karlene Haughton	Canada	55.94	q, SB
14	2	Anna Olichwierczuk	Poland	55.98	q
15	4	Sinead Dudgeon	Great Britain	56.07	Q, SB
16	4	Brenda Taylor	United States	56.28	Q
17	2	Mame Tacko Diouf	Senegal	56.44	SB
18	4	Heike Meissner	Germany	56.79	
19	3	Surita Febbraio	South Africa	56.80	
20	2	Sylvanie Morandais	France	56.85	
21	3	Melaine Walker	Jamaica	57.10	
21	4	Andrea Blackett	Barbados	57.10	
23	2	Keri Maddox	Great Britain	57.55	
24	4	Noraseela Khalid	Malaysia	59.12	
	4	Tetyana Tereshchuk-Antipova	Ukraine	DNS	

=== Semifinals ===
Qualification: First 4 in each semifinal qualified directly (Q) for the final.

Rank	Heat	Name	Nationality	Time	Notes
1	1	Daimí Pernía	Cuba	53.81	Q, WL
2	1	Nezha Bidouane	Morocco	53.85	Q, SB
3	1	Debbie-Ann Parris	Jamaica	53.88	Q, PB
4	2	Yuliya Nosova	Russia	54.03	Q
5	2	Tonja Buford-Bailey	United States	54.15	Q, SB
6	2	Deon Hemmings	Jamaica	54.47	Q, SB
7	2	Ionela Târlea	Romania	54.92	Q
8	1	Sandra Glover	United States	55.04	Q, SB
9	1	Małgorzata Pskit	Poland	55.28	
10	2	Anna Olichwierczuk	Poland	55.64	
11	1	Karlene Haughton	Canada	55.68	SB
12	1	Monika Niederstatter	Italy	56.37	
13	1	Natalya Torshina	Kazakhstan	56.45	
14	2	Brenda Taylor	United States	56.52	
15	2	Yvonne Harrison	Puerto Rico	56.70	
16	2	Sinead Dudgeon	Great Britain	56.92	

=== Final ===
Rank	Lane	Name	Nationality	Time	Notes
1st place, gold medalist(s)	4	Nezha Bidouane	Morocco	53.34	WL
2nd place, silver medalist(s)	5	Yuliya Nosova	Russia	54.27	
3rd place, bronze medalist(s)	3	Daimí Pernía	Cuba	54.51	
4	6	Tonja Buford-Bailey	United States	54.55	
5	1	Debbie-Ann Parris	Jamaica	54.68	
6	7	Ionela Târlea	Romania	55.36	
7	8	Deon Hemmings	Jamaica	55.83	
8	2	Sandra Glover	United States	57.42	
