= 2001 USA Outdoor Track and Field Championships =

- Host city: Eugene, Oregon, United States
- Venue: Hayward Field
- Events: 36

The 2001 USA Outdoor Track and Field Championships took place between June 21–24 at Hayward Field in Eugene, Oregon. The competition acted as a way of selecting the United States team for the 2001 World Championships in Athletics in Edmonton, Alberta, Canada August 3–12 later that year.

== Results ==
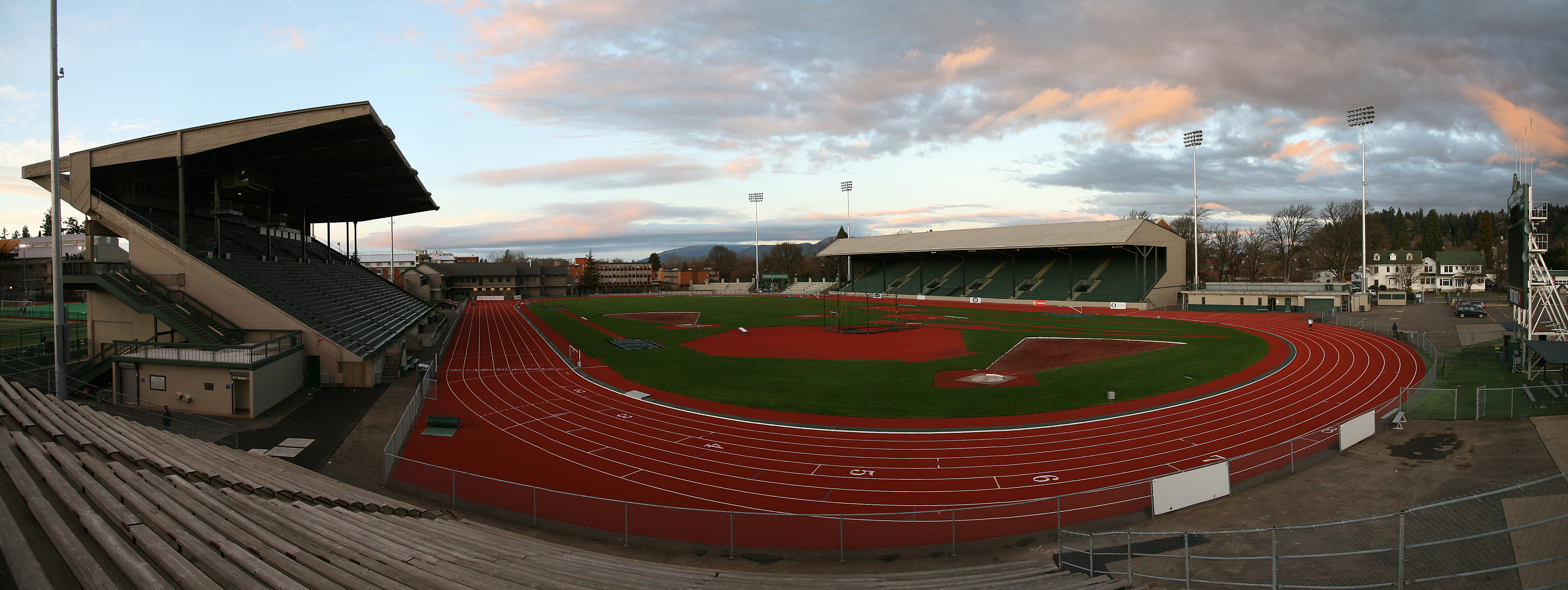
Hayward Field hosted the 2001 competition

=== Men track events ===
Event	Gold		Silver		Bronze	
100 m Wind : +3.1 m/s	Bernard Williams	9.98	Curtis Johnson	10.01	Dennis Mitchell	10.07
200 m Wind : -0.9 m/s	Shawn Crawford	20.54	Kevin Little	20.64	Darvis Patton	20.72
400 m	Leonard Byrd	45.26	Derrick Brew	45.35	Andrew Pierce	45.42
800 m	David Krummenacker	1:47.40	Derrick Peterson	1:47.40	Jesse Strutzel	1:47.53
1500 m	Andy Downin	3:37.63	Seneca Lassiter	3:37.66	Paul McMullen	3:37.94
5000 m	Bob Kennedy	13:28.72	Alan Culpepper	13:29.66	Adam Goucher	13:30.36
10,000 m	Abdi Abdirahman	28:23.82	Mebrahtom Keflezighi	28:39.64	Alan Culpepper	28:49.03
3000 m steeplechase	Thomas Chorny	8:22.16	Anthony Famiglietti	8:22.68	Tim Broe	8:24.66
20 km walk	Curt Clausen	1:24:50.00	Tim Seaman	1:26:15.00	Sean Albert	1:26:34.00
110 m hurdles Wind : -3.2 m/s	Allen Johnson	13.22	Terrence Trammell	13.46	Dawane Wallace	13.60
400 m hurdles	Angelo Taylor	48.53	Calvin Davis	48.75	James Carter	48.79

=== Men field events ===
Event	Gold		Silver		Bronze	
High jump	Nathan Leeper	2.30 m (7 ft 6 1/2 in)	Charles Austin	2.30 m (7 ft 6 1/2 in)	Henry Patterson	2.27 m (7 ft 5 1/4 in)
Pole vault	Lawrence Johnson	5.85 m (19 ft 2 1/4 in)	Timothy Mack	5.75 m (18 ft 10 1/4 in)	Nicholas Hysong	5.65 m (18 ft 6 1/4 in)
Long jump	Savante Stringfellow	8.47 m (27 ft 9 1/4 in)w +2.5	Miguel Pate	8.35 m (27 ft 4 1/2 in)w +2.5	Dwight Phillips	8.23 m (27 ft 0 in)w +3.0
Triple jump	Lamark Carter	17.17 m (56 ft 3 3/4 in) +0.0	Robert Howard	16.94 m (55 ft 6 3/4 in)w +2.2	Walter Davis	16.92 m (55 ft 6 in) +1.6
Shot put	John Godina	21.60 m (70 ft 10 1/4 in)	Adam Nelson	20.55 m (67 ft 5 in)	John Davis	20.51 m (67 ft 3 1/4 in)
Discus throw	Adam Setliff	66.85 m (219 ft 3 3/4 in)	John Godina	65.39 m (214 ft 6 1/4 in)	Andrew Bloom	62.98 m (206 ft 7 1/2 in)
Hammer throw	Kevin McMahon	76.52 m (251 ft 1/2 in)	Jay Harvard	73.17 m (240 ft 1/2 in)	James Parker	72.50 m (237 ft 10 1/4 in)
Javelin throw	Breaux Greer	85.23 m (279 ft 7 1/2 in) CR	Tom Pukstys	74.49 m (244 ft 4 1/2 in)	Ron White	72.73 m (238 ft 7 1/4 in)
Decathlon	Kip Janvrin	8241	Phil McMullen	8220	Bryan Clay	8169

=== Women track events ===
Event	Gold		Silver		Bronze	
100 m Wind : +3.5 m/s	Chryste Gaines	10.89	Angela Williams	11.01	Torri Edwards	11.09
200 m Wind : -1.6 m/s	Marion Jones	22.52	Latasha Jenkins	22.88	~~Kelli White~~ (Note: Kelli White originally finished 3rd in the 200 m in 22.93 seconds, but her place was later vacated due to drugs disqualification.); Angel Perkins	~~22.93~~; 23.46
400 m	LaTasha Colander-Richardson	50.79	Michelle Collins	51.00	Monique Hennagan	51.20
800 m	Regina Jacobs	2:00.43	Hazel Clark	2:01.15	Jennifer Toomey	2:01.28
1500 m	Regina Jacobs	4:06.12	Suzy Favor Hamilton	4:06.61	Sarah Schwald	4:08.57
5000 m	Marla Runyan	15:08.03	Regina Jacobs	15:10.78	Elva Dryer	15:11.76
10,000 m	Deena Drossin	32:05.14	Jen Rhines	32:20.03	Sylvia Mosqueda	32:25.22
3000 m steeplechase	Lisa Nye	9:49.41	Elizabeth Jackson	9:49.94	Kelly MacDonald	9:55.49
20 km walk	Michelle Rohl	1:32:49.00	Amber Antonia	1:36:37.00	Jill Zenner	1:37:10.00
100 m hurdles Wind : -2.8 m/s	Gail Devers	12.91	Jenny Adams	13.11	Anjanette Kirkland	13.14
400 m hurdles	Sandra Glover	55.08	Tonja Buford-Bailey	55.71	Brenda Taylor	55.99

=== Women field events ===
Event	Gold		Silver		Bronze	
High jump	Amy Acuff	1.88 m (6 ft 2 in)	Erin Aldrich	1.84 m (6 ft 1/4 in)	Stacy Ann Grant	1.84 m (6 ft 1/4 in)
Pole vault	Stacy Dragila	4.62 m (15 ft 1 3/4 in)	Alicia Warlick	4.40 m (14 ft 5 in)	Mary Sauer	4.40 m (14 ft 5 in)
Long jump	Jenny Adams	6.71 m (22 ft 0 in)w +2.4	Grace Upshaw	6.62 m (21 ft 8 1/2 in) +2.0	Brianna Glenn	6.49 m (21 ft 3 1/2 in)w +4.2
Triple jump	Tiombe Hurd	14.04 m (46 ft 3/4 in) +1.2	Yuliana Perez	13.98 m (45 ft 10 1/4 in)w +2.9	Sheila Hudson	13.68 m (44 ft 10 1/2 in) +1.0
Shot put	Seilala Sua	17.97 m (58 ft 11 1/4 in)	Connie Price-Smith	17.89 m (58 ft 8 1/4 in)	Kristin L. Heaston	17.17 m (56 ft 3 3/4 in)
Discus throw	Seilala Sua	63.35 m (207 ft 10 in)	Suzy Powell	63.29 m (207 ft 7 1/2 in)	Kris Kuehl	62.67 m (205 ft 7 1/4 in)
Hammer throw	Dawn Ellerbe	69.08 m (226 ft 7 1/2 in)	Anna Norgren	66.68 m (218 ft 9 in)	Melissa Price	66.25 m (217 ft 4 1/4 in)
Javelin throw	Kim Kreiner	55.76 m (182 ft 11 1/4 in)	Erica Wheeler	52.43 m (172 ft 0 in)	Serene Ross	52.07 m (170 ft 10 in)
Heptathlon	DeDee Nathan	6174	Shelia Burrell	6051	Gigi Miller	5925

== See also ==
- United States Olympic Trials (track and field)
