= 2005 World Championships in Athletics – Women's 400 metres hurdles =

The women's 400 metres hurdles event at the 2005 World Championships in Athletics was held at the Helsinki Olympic Stadium on August 10, 11 and 13.

== Medalists ==
Gold	Yuliya Pechonkina; Russia (RUS)
Silver	Lashinda Demus; United States (USA)
Bronze	Sandra Glover; United States (USA)

== Results ==
All times shown are in seconds.
Q denotes qualification by place.
q denotes qualification by time.
DNS denotes did not start.
DNF denotes did not finish.
AR denotes area record
NR denotes national record.
PB denotes personal best.
SB denotes season's best.

=== Heats ===
August 10

==== Heat 1 ====
1. (Russia) Yuliya Pechonkina 53.77 Q
2. (Poland) Małgorzata Pskit 55.72 Q
3. (Greece) Hristina Hantzi-Neag 56.15 Q (PB)
4. (Barbados) Andrea Blackett 56.32 Q
5. (Germany) Claudia Marx 56.60 q
6. (United Kingdom) Nicola Sanders 56.83 q
7. (Malaysia) Noraseela Mohd Khalid 57.58

==== Heat 2 ====
1. (Poland) Anna Jesień 55.79 Q
2. (Italy) Benedetta Ceccarelli 56.00 Q
3. (Sweden) Louise Gundert 56.53 Q
4. (Canada) Tawa Dortch 56.54 Q
5. (Jamaica) Shevon Stoddart 56.55 q
6. (Nicaragua) Jessica Aguilera 1:04.43 (PB)
- (China) Xing Wang DSQ

==== Heat 3 ====
1. (United States) Sandra Glover 55.31 Q
2. (South Africa) Surita Febbraio 55.89 Q
3. (Poland) Marta Chrust-Rożej 56.35 Q
4. (Czech Republic) Zuzana Hejnová 56.86 Q
5. (Spain) Cora Olivero 56.96 q
6. (Kazakhstan) Natalya Torshina-Alimzhanova 58.26
7. (Comoros) Salhate Djamaldine 1:00.33

==== Heat 4 ====
1. (United States) Lashinda Demus 56.63 Q
2. (Netherlands) Marjolein de Jong 56.95 Q
3. (Russia) Oksana Gulumyan 57.21 Q
4. (Jamaica) Debbie-Ann Parris-Thymes 58.27 Q
5. (Trinidad and Tobago) Josanne Lucas 58.99
6. (Burkina Faso) Aïssata Soulama 59.28
7. (Finland) Ilona Ranta 59.42

==== Heat 5 ====
1. (Ukraine) Tetiana Tereschuk-Antipova 56.16 Q
2. (China) Xiaoxiao Huang 56.56 Q
3. (Italy) Monika Niederstätter 57.18 Q
4. (United States) Shauna Smith 58.33 Q
5. (Bulgaria) Vania Stambolova 58.99
- (Russia) Yevgeniya Isakova DNS
- (Vietnam) Thi Nu Nguyen DNS

=== Semifinals ===
August 11

==== Heat 1 ====
1. (Poland) Anna Jesień 54.34 Q
2. (China) Xiaoxiao Huang 54.34 Q (PB)
3. (Barbados) Andrea Blackett 55.79 q (SB)
4. (Ukraine) Tetiana Tereschuk-Antipova 55.13 q (SB)
5. (Germany) Claudia Marx 55.64
6. (Netherlands) Marjolein de Jong 55.92
7. (United States) Shauna Smith 55.97
8. (Italy) Monika Niederstätter 56.14

==== Heat 2 ====
1. (United States) Sandra Glover 54.16 Q
2. (Poland) Małgorzata Pskit 55.20 Q
3. (Italy) Benedetta Ceccarelli 55.41 (SB)
4. (Canada) Tawa Dortch 55.58 (PB)
5. (Russia) Oksana Gulumyan 56.12
6. (Jamaica) Shevon Stoddart 56.49
7. (Greece) Hristina Hantzi-Neag 57.11
- (United Kingdom) Nicola Sanders DSQ

==== Heat 3 ====
1. (Russia) Yuliya Pechonkina 53.86 Q
2. (United States) Lashinda Demus 55.00 Q
3. (South Africa) Surita Febbraio 55.74
4. (Jamaica) Debbie-Ann Parris-Thymes 55.96
5. (Spain) Cora Olivero 56.47
6. (Poland) Marta Chrust-Rożej 56.80
7. (Czech Republic) Zuzana Hejnová 57.29
- (Sweden) Louise Gundert DSQ

=== Final ===
August 13

1. (Russia) Yuliya Pechonkina 52.90 (WL)
2. (United States) Lashinda Demus 53.27 (PB)
3. (United States) Sandra Glover 53.32 (PB)
4. (Poland) Anna Jesień 54.17
5. (China) Xiaoxiao Huang 54.47
6. (Barbados) Andrea Blackett 55.06
7. (Ukraine) Tetiana Tereschuk-Antipova 55.09 (SB)
8. (Poland) Małgorzata Pskit 55.58
