= Brenda Taylor (hurdler) =

American track and field athlete (born 1979)

Personal information
- Born: February 9, 1979 (age 47) St. Louis, Missouri, U.S.

Sport
- Sport: Track and field
Medal record
Women's athletics
Representing the United States
World Indoor Championships
| Bronze medal – third place | 2003 Birmingham | 4 × 400 m relay |

Brenda Taylor (born February 9, 1979) is an American track and field athlete who specialises in the 400 meter hurdles. She reached the final of the event at the 2004 Summer Olympics. She also competed at the 2001 World Championships in Athletics and won a medal at the 2003 IAAF World Indoor Championships in the 4×400-meter relay.

Taylor is a Harvard University medical graduate and won the hurdles at the 2001 NCAA Championships representing the Harvard Crimson track team.

== Career ==
Taylor was born in St. Louis, Missouri and grew up in Boone, North Carolina. She graduated from Watauga High School in 1997. Taylor was a three-time NCHSAA 4A state champion in both the 100 meter high hurdles and 300 meter intermediate hurdles. She was also an NCHSAA indoor track state champion in the all classes 55 meter hurdles and 1600 meter relay.

Taylor competed collegiately for the Harvard Crimson, studying psychology and biology at Harvard University. She finished seventh in the 400 m hurdles at the NCAA Women's Outdoor Track and Field Championship in 2000. Taylor's greatest college achievements came in her final year at Harvard when she ran a personal best of 55.88 seconds to win the NCAA final. She improved her best to 55.46 at a meeting in Zagreb and then went on to reach to podium at the 2001 USA Outdoor Track and Field Championships, winning the bronze medal. As a result of these achievements, Taylor received the 2000–01 Honda Sports Award as the top women's collegiate track athlete.

Taylor's performance at the national championships gained her selection into the 2001 World Championships in Athletics. Taylor finished sixth place in her semi-final. The following year, she was again third place in the 400 m hurdles at the national championships. Taylor began the 2003 season with a fourth-place performance in the 400 metres at the USA Indoor Track and Field Championships. This earned her a place on the 4 × 400-meter relay team at the 2003 IAAF World Indoor Championships, where an American team of Monique Hennagan, Meghan Addy, Taylor and Mary Danner took the bronze medal.

In the outdoor season, Taylor came first at the Mt. SAC Relays and again finished third at the Outdoor U.S. Championships. However, she encountered the more illicit side of track and field at the championships as she was offered the banned substance modafinil. She claimed that she was "the only person that didn't take it". One of her competitors, Sandra Glover, was among those later banned for taking the drug at the championships. Taylor was chosen to compete at the 2003 Pan American Games and she finished fourth behind Andrea Blackett in the 400 m hurdles final. Taylor attended track and field meetings in Europe, coming third in Zagreb and taking fourth at the Weltklasse Zurich in a personal record time of 54.92 seconds. She qualified for the 2003 IAAF World Athletics Final and finished in fifth place, running 54.93 seconds.

Taylor reached the pinnacle of her athletic career in 2004, beginning with a win at the Mt. SAC Relays in a meet record time, and a personal best beating run of 54.36 seconds for second at Golden Spike Ostrava. At the 2004 United States Olympic Trials she improved even further, finishing as runner-up to Sheena Johnson with a time of 53.36 seconds. Gaining her first ever berth on the Olympic team, Taylor set her sights on the 2004 Athens Olympics. Taylor reached the Olympic hurdles final and took seventh place with a run of 54.97 seconds. She closed the season with a bronze medal at the 2004 IAAF World Athletics Final. Her new best time of 53.36 ranked her as the fifth fastest 400 m hurdler of 2004.

Taylor has a twin sister, Lindsay Taylor, who competes in the pole vault. Taylor abruptly stopped competing in professional athletics after 2004.

== Personal bests ==
| Event | Time (sec) | Venue | Date |
|---|---|---|---|
| 400 metres hurdles | 53.36 | Sacramento, California, United States | July 11, 2004 |
| 400 metres | 52.56 | San Diego, California, United States | March 22, 2003 |
| 100 metres hurdles | 13.19 | San Diego, California, United States | June 19, 2004 |

- All information taken from IAAF profile.

== Competition record ==
| Year | Competition | Venue | Position | Event | Notes |
|---|---|---|---|---|---|
| 2001 | World Championships | Edmonton, Canada | 14th (semis) | 400 m hurdles | 56.52 |
| 2002 | NACAC U-25 Championships | San Antonio, Texas, United States | 2nd | 400 m hurdles | 57.65 |
| 2003 | World Indoor Championships | Birmingham, United Kingdom | 3rd | 4 × 400 m relay | 3:31.69 |
| 2003 | Pan American Games | Santo Domingo, Dominican Republic | 4th | 400 m hurdles | 55.27 |
| 2003 | World Athletics Final | Monte Carlo, Monaco | 5th | 400 m hurdles | 54.93 |
| 2004 | Olympic Games | Athens, Greece | 7th | 400 m hurdles | 54.97 |
| 2004 | World Athletics Final | Monte Carlo, Monaco | 3rd | 400 m hurdles | 55.00 |
