= 2002 USA Outdoor Track and Field Championships =

- Dates: June 21–23
- Host city: Palo Alto, California
- Venue: Cobb Track & Angell Field
- Events: 40

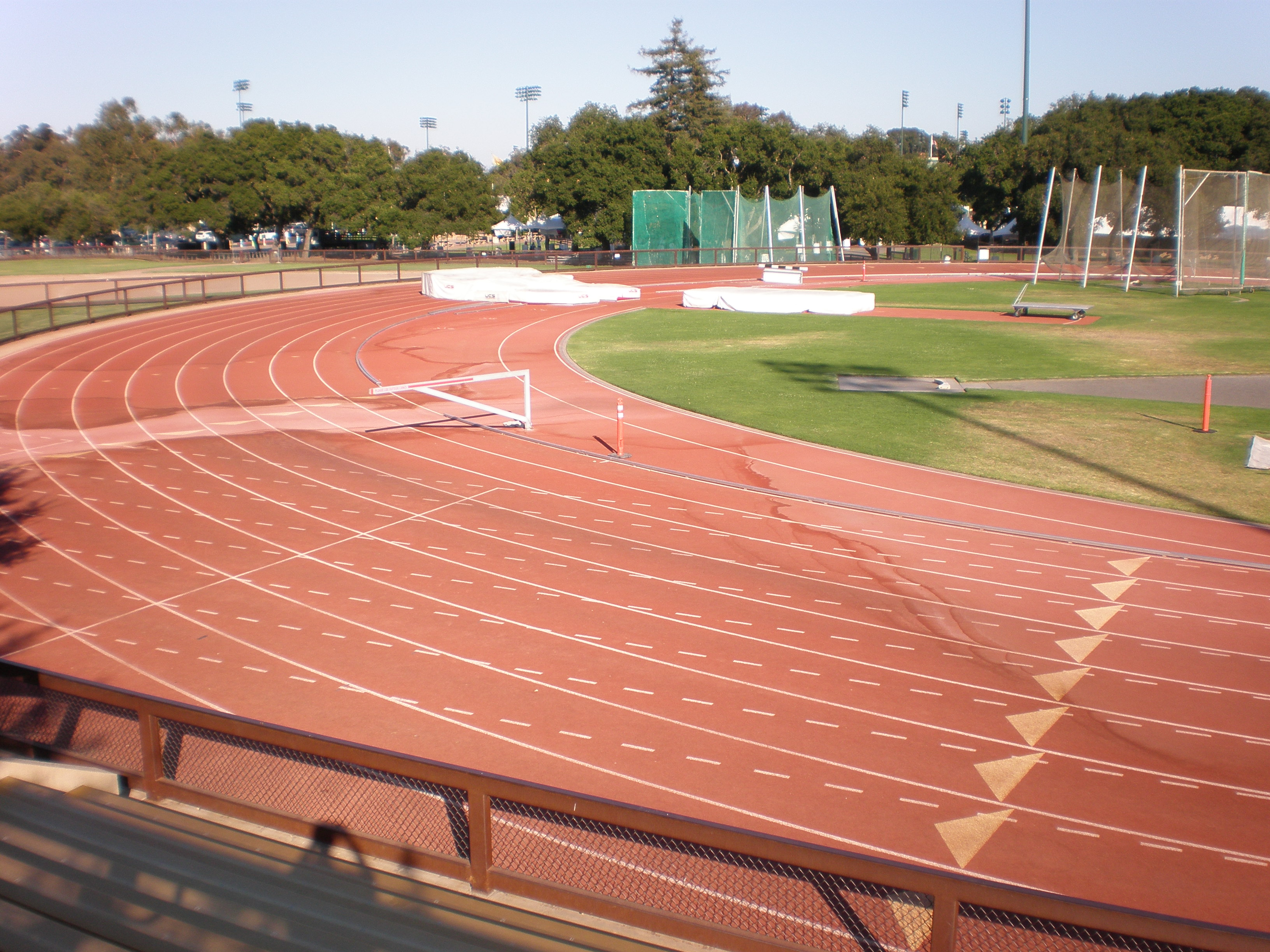
The Cobb Track and Angell Field hosted the 2002 competition

The 2002 USA Outdoor Track and Field Championships was organised by USA Track & Field and held from June 21 to 23 at the Cobb Track & Angell Field in Palo Alto, California. The three-day competition served as the national championships in track and field for the United States. The same facility would host this meet the following year, but this was the last year to use the three day format as the four-day format was adopted in 2003. The combined track and field events were contested at Edwards Stadium in Berkeley, California in the two days preceding the start of the main programme.

Marion Jones won a women's 100 m/200 m sprint double – the third time in her career that she had done so, and her fifth straight 200 m win. Four had their fourth consecutive title at the event: Regina Jacobs in the 1500 m, Gail Devers in the 100 m hurdles, Sandra Glover in the 400 m hurdles, and Stacy Dragila in the pole vault. On the men's side Allen Johnson had his third straight and fifth career 110 m hurdles win. In the throws both Breaux Greer (javelin) and Adam Setliff (discus) took their third consecutive titles, while Lance Deal won his ninth career (and final) hammer throw championship.

The sprinting events were affected by retrospective doping disqualifications: the original men's 200 m and 400 m winners Ramon Clay and Alvin Harrison were stripped of their national titles. Darvis Patton and Angelo Taylor were raised to the status of national champion as a result. Men's 100 m runner-up Tim Montgomery was also disqualified, as was women's 100 m third-placer Kelli White.

The competition was used to select the national teams to be sent to the 2002 IAAF World Cup and also the 2002 IAAF World Race Walking Cup. Four American national champions went on to win at that year's IAAF World Cup competition: James Carter (400 m hurdles), Savanté Stringfellow (long jump) Adam Nelson (shot put) and Gail Devers (100 m hurdles).

== Results ==
=== Men track events ===
Event	Gold		Silver		Bronze	
100 m Wind : +2.4 m/s	Maurice Greene	9.88w	Jon Drummond	10.04w	Joshua J. Johnson	10.10w
200 m Wind : +1.8 m/s	Darvis Patton	20.31	Bernard Williams	20.37	Shawn Crawford	20.57
400 m	Angelo Taylor	45.00	Antonio Pettigrew	45.17	Leonard Byrd	45.28
800 m	David Krummenacker	1:47.24	Khadevis Robinson	1:47.58	Derrick Peterson	1:48.14
1500 m	Seneca Lassiter	3:40.90	Bryan Berryhill	3:40.98	Ibrahim Aden	3:41.19
5000 m	Alan Culpepper	13:27.52	Mebrahtom Keflezighi	13:30.05	Matt Lane	13:30.58
10,000 m	Mebrahtom Keflezighi	27:41.68	Abdi Abdirahman	27:42.83	Alan Culpepper	27:48.09
3000 m steeplechase	Anthoney Famiglietti	8:19.07	Steve Slattery	8:23.44	Tim Broe	8:23.61
20 km walk	Tim Seaman	1:26:40.36	Albert Heppner	1:27:56.46	Kevin Eastler	1:28:35.67
110 m hurdles Wind : +0.1 m/s	Allen Johnson	13.08	Terrence Trammell	13.17	Larry Wade	13.18
400 m hurdles	James Carter	48.12	Joey Woody	48.52	Eric Thomas	49.72

=== Men field events ===
Event	Gold		Silver		Bronze	
High jump	Nathan Leeper	2.32 m (7 ft 7 1/4 in)	Charles Clinger	2.29 m (7 ft 6 in)	Matt Hemingway	2.29 m (7 ft 6 in)
Pole vault	Jeff Hartwig	5.84 m (19 ft 1 3/4 in)	Timothy Mack	5.74 m (18 ft 9 3/4 in)	Nicholas Hysong	5.74 m (18 ft 9 3/4 in)
Long jump	Savante Stringfellow	8.52 m (27 ft 11 1/4 in) (+0.7)	Miguel Pate	8.45 m (27 ft 8 1/2 in) (+1.5)	Dwight Phillips	8.25 m (27 ft 3/4 in) (+2.9)^{[w1]}
Triple jump	Walter Davis	17.59 m (57 ft 8 1/2 in) (+1.8)	Tim Rusan	17.30 m (56 ft 9 in) (+2.1)^{[w2]}	LeVar Anderson	16.74 m (54 ft 11 in) (+3.5)^{[w3]}
Shot put	Adam Nelson	22.22 m (72 ft 10 3/4 in)	John Godina	21.91 m (71 ft 10 1/2 in)	Kevin Toth	21.53 m (70 ft 7 1/2 in)
Discus throw	Adam Setliff	63.74 m (209 ft 1 1/4 in)	John Godina	63.18 m (207 ft 3 1/4 in)	Ian Waltz	62.26 m (204 ft 3 in)
Hammer throw	Lance Deal	74.49 m (244 ft 4 1/2 in)	John McEwen	74.18 m (243 ft 4 1/4 in)	Kevin McMahon	73.65 m (241 ft 7 1/2 in)
Javelin throw	Breaux Greer	81.78 m (268 ft 3 1/2 in)	Latrell Frederick	77.91 m (255 ft 7 1/4 in)	Christopher Clever	75.86 m (248 ft 10 1/2 in)
Decathlon	Tom Pappas	8398 pts	Bryan Clay	8230 pts	Phillip McMullen	7934 pts

- ^{w1} Dwight Phillips's best wind-legal mark in the long jump was 8.14 m (+2.0)
- ^{w2} Tim Rusan's best wind-legal mark in the triple jump was 16.75 m (+0.0)
- ^{w3} LeVar Anderson's best wind-legal mark in the triple jump was 16.65 m (+0.6)

=== Women track events ===
Event	Gold		Silver		Bronze	
100 m Wind : -1.0 m/s	Marion Jones	11.01	Chryste Gaines	11.05	Torri Edwards	11.28
200 m Wind : +0.1 m/s	Marion Jones	22.35	Stephanie Durst	23.14	Muna Lee	23.16
400 m	Jearl Miles Clark	50.91	Michelle Collins	51.20	Monique Hennagan	51.34
800 m	Nicole Teter	1:58.83	Jennifer Toomey	2:02.11	Sasha Spencer	2:02.34
1500 m	Regina Jacobs	4:09.57	Suzy Favor Hamilton	4:11.31	Sarah Schwald	4:11.40
5000 m	Marla Runyan	15:07.19	Deena Drossin	15:13.93	Carrie Tollefson	15:21.37
10,000 m	Jen Rhines	31:57.38	Milena Glusac	32:15.09	Katie McGregor	32:17.49
3000 m steeplechase	Elizabeth Jackson	9:47.35	Lisa Nye	9:52.61	Lisa Aguilera	9:59.66
20 km walk	Joanne Dow	1:34:46.52	Teresa Vaill	1:34:53.46	Amber Antonia	1:35:59.44
100 m hurdles Wind : -0.5 m/s	Gail Devers	12.51	Miesha McKelvy	12.60	Anjanette Kirkland	12.85
400 m hurdles	Sandra Glover	55.22	Megan Addy	57.28	Brenda Taylor	57.62

=== Women field events ===
Event	Gold		Silver		Bronze	
High jump	Tisha Waller	1.96 m (6 ft 5 in)	Gwen Wentland	1.93 m (6 ft 3 3/4 in)	Amy Acuff	1.90 m (6 ft 2 3/4 in)
Pole vault	Stacy Dragila	4.65 m (15 ft 3 in)	Mary Sauer	4.45 m (14 ft 7 in)	Melissa Mueller	4.40 m (14 ft 5 in)
Long jump	Brianna Glenn	6.46 m (21 ft 2 1/4 in) (+0.0)	Grace Upshaw	6.43 m (21 ft 1 in) (+1.1)	Tiffany Greer	6.39 m (20 ft 11 1/2 in) (+0.5)
Triple jump	Yuliana Perez	14.20 m (46 ft 7 in) (+2.5)^{[w4]}	Vanitta Kinard	13.83 m (45 ft 4 1/4 in) (+1.6)	Teresa Bundy	13.79 m (45 ft 2 3/4 in) (+2.2)^{[w5]}
Shot put	Teri Steer	19.20 m (62 ft 11 3/4 in)	Seilala Sua	18.51 m (60 ft 8 1/2 in)	Kristin Heaston	17.59 m (57 ft 8 1/2 in)
Discus throw	Kris Kuehl	64.44 m (211 ft 5 in)	Suzy Powell	62.57 m (205 ft 3 1/4 in)	Aretha Hill	62.41 m (204 ft 9 in)
Hammer throw	Anna Mahon	70.27 m (230 ft 6 1/2 in)	Dawn Ellerbe	67.19 m (220 ft 5 1/4 in)	Jamine Moton	65.84 m (216 ft 0 in)
Javelin throw	Serene Ross	60.06 m (197 ft 1/2 in)	Kim Kreiner	57.93 m (190 ft 1/2 in)	Erica Wheeler	54.97 m (180 ft 4 in)
Heptathlon	Shelia Burrell	6299 pts	DeDee Nathan	5995 pts	Kim Schiemenz	5840 pts

- ^{w4} Yuliana Perez's best wind-legal mark in the triple jump was 14.10 m (+0.5)
- ^{w5} Teresa Bundy's best wind-legal mark in the triple jump was 13.59 m (+1.3)

== Doping ==
The following athletes had their performances at the competition annulled due to doping:

- Tim Montgomery (originally second in the men's 100 m with a time of 9.89 seconds)
- Kelli White (originally third place in the women's 100 m with a time of 11.22 seconds)
- Ramon Clay (originally winner of the men's 200 m with a time of 20.27 seconds)
- Alvin Harrison (originally winner of the men's 400 m with a time of 44.62 seconds)

== See also ==
- United States Olympic Trials (track and field)
