= Yvonne Harrison =

Puerto Rican track and field runner

Personal information
- Born: December 2, 1975 (age 50) New York City, United States
- Home town: The Bronx, United States

Sport
- Sport: Track and field
Medal record
Representing Puerto Rico
World Junior Championships
Gold medal – first place	1994 Lisbon	4x400m relay
Central American and Caribbean Games
Gold medal – first place	2002 San Salvador	400m hurdles

Yvonne Harrison Castro, also spelled Ivonne (born December 2, 1975 in New York City) is a Puerto Rican athlete who specialized in the 400 metres hurdles. She competed at two World Junior Championships, two World Championships, one World Indoor Championships and one Olympic Games.

== Biography ==
Harrison grew up in Throggs Neck, The Bronx, where she was one of the top high school athletes in the U.S. competing for Herbert H. Lehman High School. As a 16 year old, she knew Carl Lewis and claimed to be "practically... best friends" with Florence Griffith-Joyner before her death.

In 1998 she finished second in the 1998 NCAA Division I Outdoor Track and Field Championships for the Illinois Fighting Illini track and field team. In the same year she was eliminated in the heats at the 1998 NCAA Division I Indoor Track and Field Championships (400 metres) and the 1998 USA Outdoor Track and Field Championships. The next year, she reached the final and finished 7th at the 1999 USA Outdoor Track and Field Championships—improving to a 6th place at the 2000 United States Olympic trials.

In 2001 she changed athletic allegiance to Puerto Rico, immediately winning the gold medal in 400 metres hurdles at the 2001 Central American and Caribbean Championships as well as a silver medal in the 4 × 400 metres relay. At the 2001 World Championships she competed in both 400 metres hurdles and 4 × 400 metres relay, achieving Puerto Rican records in both events. In 2002 she continued to win the 2002 Central American and Caribbean Games and the bronze medal at the 2002 Ibero-American Championships. At the latter, she also won a relay bronze.

In 2003 she participated in the indoor season, running the 400 metres in the heats of the 2003 World Indoor Championships, before starting her outdoor season in South Africa the same month. She attended meets in Martinique, Japan and Europe and won the Puerto Rican Championships before heading to the international championships. Harrison won the silver medal at the 2003 Central American and Caribbean Championships. At the 2003 Pan American Games, she finished fifth in the 400 metres hurdles and sixth in the 4 × 400 metres relay. She also participated at the 2003 World Championships without finishing the race.

Newspapers such as El Vocero and El Nuevo Dia covered her accomplishments extensively.

She finished eighth at the 2004 Japan Grand Prix in Osaka and seventh at the Grande Premio Rio de Atletismo in Rio. After that, she sustained an injury that required her to take a rest from competition for a while. She returned to attend the Golden Gala and other meets in Europe, including the KBC Night of Athletics, before winning the bronze medal at the 2004 Ibero-American Championships. Harrison subsequently made her Olympic debut at the 2004 Olympic Games, being eliminated in the heats. Competing sparingly in 2005 and 2006, she did win another bronze medal at the 2006 Ibero-American Championships, this time held in Puerto Rico, and competed at the 2006 Central American and Caribbean Games without finishing her race.

== Coaching career ==
She was, as of 2022, an assistant sprint coach at Saint Joseph’s University alongside Michael Glavin.

== Achievements ==
Year	Competition	Venue	Position	Event	Notes
Representing the United States
1992	World Junior Championships	Seoul, South Korea	19th (h)	400m hurdles	64.26
1994	World Junior Championships	Lisbon, Portugal	16th (h)	400m hurdles	61.22
1994	World Junior Championships	Lisbon, Portugal	1st (h)	4 × 400 m relay	3:37.13
Representing Puerto Rico
2002	Central American and Caribbean Games	San Salvador, El Salvador	1st	400m hurdles	57.39

== See also ==
- List of Puerto Ricans
