= Anna Jesień =

Polish hurdler

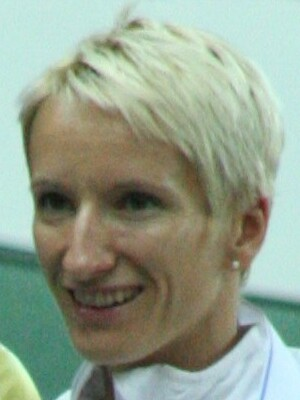
- Jesień at Osaka 2007

Personal information
- Nationality: Poland
- Born: Anna Olichwierczuk; 10 December 1978 (age 47) Kostki, Poland
- Height: 1.68 m (5 ft 6 in)
- Weight: 58 kg (128 lb) (2012)

Sport
- Sport: Athletics
- Event: 400 m hurdles
- Club: LŁKS Prefbet Śniadowo Łomża; Skra Warszawa
Medal record
Women's Athletics
Representing Poland
World Championships
Bronze medal – third place	2007 Osaka	400 m hurdles
European Championships
Bronze medal – third place	2002 Munich	4x400 m relay
Bronze medal – third place	2002 Munich	400 m hurdles
Bronze medal – third place	2006 Gothenburg	4x400 m relay
European Team Championships
Gold medal – first place	2009 Leiria	400 m hurdles

Anna Marta Jesień (née Olichwierczuk, born 10 December 1978 in Kostki near Sokołów Podlaski) is a Polish former hurdler.

She won the bronze medal in the 400 m hurdles at the 2002 European Athletics Championships in Munich. Four years later she finished 6th in the final of the same event at the 2006 European Athletics Championships in Gothenburg.

She also competed in both 2000 Olympic Games and the 2004 Olympic Games but failed to make it through the heats on both occasions. She finished 4th in the 2005 World Championships. In 2007, she won the bronze medal at World Championships in Osaka.

At the 2008 Olympics, she reached the final of the 400 m hurdles and finished in 5th place, while the women's 4 x 400 metre team reached the semi-finals. At the 2012 Olympics, she reached the semi-finals in the 400 m hurdles.

== Competition record ==
Year	Competition	Venue	Position	Event	Notes
Representing Poland
1997	European Junior Championships	Ljubljana, Slovenia	15th (h)	400 m hurdles	61.18
1999	European U23 Championships	Gothenburg, Sweden	17th (h)	400 m hurdles	59.60
1999	European U23 Championships	Gothenburg, Sweden	4th	4 × 400 m relay	3:33.28
2000	Olympic Games	Sydney, Australia	21st (h)	400 m hurdles	57.36
2001	World Championships	Edmonton, Canada	10th (sf)	400 m hurdles	55.64
2002	European Championships	Munich, Germany	3rd	400 m hurdles	56.18
2002	European Championships	Munich, Germany	3rd	4 × 400 m relay	3:26.15
2003	World Championships	Paris, France	16th (h)	400 m hurdles	56.07
2003	World Championships	Paris, France	5th	4 × 400 m relay	3:26.64
2004	Olympic Games	Athens, Greece	21st (h)	400 m hurdles	56.03
2005	World Championships	Helsinki, Finland	4th	400 m hurdles	54.17
2005	World Championships	Helsinki, Finland	4th	4 × 400 m relay	3:24.49 (NR)
2006	European Championships	Gothenburg, Sweden	6th	400 m hurdles	55.16
2006	European Championships	Gothenburg, Sweden	3rd	4 × 400 m relay	3:27.77
2007	World Championships	Osaka, Japan	3rd	400 m hurdles	53.92
2007	World Championships	Osaka, Japan	6th	4 × 400 m relay	3:26.49
2008	Olympic Games	Beijing, China	5th	400 m hurdles	53.99
2008	Olympic Games	Beijing, China	11th (h)	4 × 400 m relay	3:28.23
2009	World Championships	Berlin, Germany	8th (sf)	400 m hurdles	54.82
2010	European Championships	Barcelona, Spain	12th (h)	4 × 400 m relay	3:35.25
2012	European Championships	Helsinki, Finland	8th	4 × 400 m relay	3:30.17
2012	Olympic Games	London, United Kingdom	22nd (sf)	400 m hurdles	56.28
2012	Olympic Games	London, United Kingdom	12th (h)	4 × 400 m relay	3:30.15

== See also ==
- Polish records in athletics
