= 1994 World Junior Championships in Athletics – Women's 4 × 400 metres relay =

The women's 4x400 metres relay event at the 1994 World Junior Championships in Athletics was held in Lisbon, Portugal, at Estádio Universitário de Lisboa on 23 and 24 July.

== Medalists ==
Gold	Cicely Scott; Monique Hennagan; Michelle Brown; Jowanna McMullen; United States
Silver	Marinella Mircea; Lavinia Miroiu; Andrea Burlacu; Ionela Tîrlea; Romania
Bronze	Susanne Merkel; Claudia Angerhausen; Ivonne Teichmann; Ulrike Urbansky; Germany

== Results ==
=== Final ===
24 July

Rank	Nation	Competitors	Time	Notes
1st place, gold medalist(s)	United States	Cicely Scott; Monique Hennagan; Michelle Brown; Jowanna McMullen	3:32.08	
2nd place, silver medalist(s)	Romania	Marinella Mircea; Lavinia Miroiu; Andrea Burlacu; Ionela Tîrlea	3:36.59	
3rd place, bronze medalist(s)	Germany	Susanne Merkel; Claudia Angerhausen; Ivonne Teichmann; Ulrike Urbansky	3:36.65	
4	Russia	Olga Kotlyarova; Valentina Golovko; Lyudmila Voronicheva; Larisa Bolenok	3:37.41	
5	Finland	Sari Kärkäs; Riikka Niemelä; Kirsi Kemppainen; Heidi Suomi	3:37.55	
6	South Africa	Yolande Venter; Marie-Louise Henning; Adri van der Merwe; Ronelle Ullrich	3:37.93	
7	Cuba	Yudalis Díaz; Mairelín Fuentes; Lidurka Torres; Daimí Pernía	3:37.95	
8	United Kingdom	Katharine Eustace; Joanne Sloane; Allison Curbishley; Louretta Thorne	3:39.80	

=== Heats ===
23 July

==== Heat 1 ====
Rank	Nation	Competitors	Time	Notes
1	United States	Michelle Brown; Cicely Scott; Yvonne Harrison; Jowanna McMullen	3:37.13	Q
2	Germany	Susanne Merkel; Sonja Wilmsmeyer; Ivonne Teichmann; Ulrike Urbansky	3:38.03	Q
3	Finland	Sari Kärkäs; Riikka Niemelä; Kirsi Kemppainen; Heidi Suomi	3:38.10	Q
4	Jamaica	Charmaine Howell; Shelly-Ann Berth; Tanya Jarrett; Michelle Ballentine	3:39.58	
5	Italy	Manuela Caddeo; Federica Selis; Claudia Salvarani; Virna De Angeli	3:41.02	
6	Bahamas	Vernetta Rolle; Ingrid Sears; Tonique Williams; Debbie Ferguson	3:44.67	
7	Canada	Cathy Rejouis; Mame Twumasi; Francis Seally; Lisa Duffus	3:46.82	

==== Heat 2 ====
Rank	Nation	Competitors	Time	Notes
1	Romania	Marinella Mircea; Lavinia Miroiu; Andrea Burlacu; Ionela Tîrlea	3:37.29	Q
2	Russia	Olga Kotlyarova; Valentina Golovko; Polina Staroverova; Larisa Bolenok	3:37.68	Q
3	South Africa	Yolande Venter; Marie-Louise Henning; Adri van der Merwe; Ronelle Ullrich	3:38.14	Q
4	United Kingdom	Katharine Eustace; Joanne Sloane; Allison Curbishley; Louretta Thorne	3:38.70	q
5	Cuba	Yudalis Díaz; Mairelín Fuentes; Lidurka Torres; Daimí Pernía	3:38.78	q
6	Australia	Kylie Watkins; Rebecca Campbell; Chelsea Andrews; Melanie Bradley	3:40.36	
7	Nigeria	Florence Ekpo-Umoh; Mercy Nku; Endurance Ojokolo; Olabisi Afolabi	3:49.16	
	China	Chen Zhenhong; Zhu Wei; Zhang Yu; Li Yajun	DQ	

== Participation ==
According to an unofficial count, 63 athletes from 15 countries participated in the event.

- Australia (4)
- Bahamas (4)
- Canada (4)
- China (4)
- Cuba (4)
- Finland (4)
- Germany (5)
- Italy (4)
- Jamaica (4)
- Nigeria (4)
- Romania (4)
- Russia (5)
- South Africa (4)
- United Kingdom (4)
- United States (5)
