= Athletics at the 2003 Pan American Games – Women's 400 metres hurdles =

Women's 400 metres hurdles at the Pan American Games

The final of the Women's 400 metres Hurdles event at the 2003 Pan American Games took place on Wednesday August 6, 2003, with the heats staged a day earlier. America's Joanna Hayes was the only woman to go under the 55-seconds barrier, clocking 54.77 in the final.

== Medalists ==
Gold	Joanna Hayes; United States
Silver	Daimí Pernía; Cuba
Bronze	Andrea Blackett; Barbados

== Records ==
World Record	Kim Batten (USA)	52.61 s	August 11, 1995	Gothenburg, Sweden
Pan Am Record	Daimí Pernía (CUB)	53.44 s	July 28, 1999	Winnipeg, Canada

== Results ==
Rank	Athlete	Heats		Final
Rank	Athlete	Time	Rank	Time
1	Joanna Hayes (USA)	55.64	1	54.77
2	Daimí Pernía (CUB)	55.77	3	55.10
3	Andrea Blackett (BAR)	55.86	5	55.24
4	Brenda Taylor (USA)	55.76	2	55.27
5	Yvonne Harrison (PUR)	55.79	4	55.27
6	Allison Beckford (JAM)	56.85	8	55.50
7	Debbie-Ann Parris-Thymes (JAM)	55.97	6	56.73
8	Lucimar Teodoro (BRA)	56.33	7	57.56
9	Princesa Oliveros (COL)	57.44	9	
10	Yudalis Díaz (CUB)	57.92	10	
11	Jazmín Rodríguez (DOM)	58.42 NR	11	
12	Perla dos Santos (BRA)	1:00.28	12	

== See also ==
- 2003 World Championships in Athletics – Women's 400 metres hurdles
- Athletics at the 2004 Summer Olympics – Women's 400 metre hurdles
