= 1997 European Athletics U23 Championships – Women's 400 metres hurdles =

The women's 400 metres hurdles event at the 1997 European Athletics U23 Championships was held in Turku, Finland, on 11 and 12 July 1997.

== Medalists ==
Gold	Rikke Rønholt; Denmark
Silver	Vicki Jamison; Great Britain
Bronze	Małgorzata Pskit; Poland

== Results ==
=== Final ===
12 July

Rank	Name	Nationality	Time	Notes
1st place, gold medalist(s)	Rikke Rønholt	Denmark	57.22	
2nd place, silver medalist(s)	Vicki Jamison	Great Britain	57.43	
3rd place, bronze medalist(s)	Małgorzata Pskit	Poland	57.68	
4	Lara Rocco	Italy	57.88	
5	Orsolya Dóczi	Hungary	58.41	
6	Anastasiya Lemekhova	Russia	58.68	
7	Cornelia Spycher	Switzerland	59.28	
8	Dagmar Votočková	Czech Republic	59.37	

=== Heats ===
11 July
Qualified: first 3 in each heat and 2 best to the Final

==== Heat 1 ====
Rank	Name	Nationality	Time	Notes
1	Lara Rocco	Italy	58.42	Q
2	Orsolya Dóczi	Hungary	58.56	Q
3	Dagmar Votočková	Czech Republic	58.63	Q
4	Natasha Danvers	Great Britain	58.70	
5	Meta Mačus	Slovenia	59.52	

==== Heat 2 ====
Rank	Name	Nationality	Time	Notes
1	Rikke Rønholt	Denmark	57.04	Q
2	Małgorzata Pskit	Poland	57.82	Q
3	Anastasiya Lemekhova	Russia	58.33	Q
4	Cornelia Spycher	Switzerland	58.49	q
5	Vicki Jamison	Great Britain	58.56	q
6	Jovana Miljković	Yugoslavia	61.00	

== Participation ==
According to an unofficial count, 11 athletes from 10 countries participated in the event.

- Czech Republic (1)
- Denmark (1)
- Great Britain (2)
- Hungary (1)
- Italy (1)
- Poland (1)
- Russia (1)
- Slovenia (1)
- Switzerland (1)
- Yugoslavia (1)
