= Athletics at the 1998 Commonwealth Games – Women's 400 metres hurdles =

Women's 400 metres hurdles at the Commonwealth Games

The women's 400 metres hurdles event at the 1998 Commonwealth Games was held on 18 September on National Stadium, Bukit Jalil.

== Results ==
Rank	Lane	Name	Nationality	Time	Notes
1st place, gold medalist(s)	4	Andrea Blackett	Barbados	53.91	GR
2nd place, silver medalist(s)	6	Gowry Retchakan-Hodge	England	55.25	SB
3rd place, bronze medalist(s)	2	Karlene Haughton	Canada	55.53	SB
4	8	Keri Maddox	England	56.38	PB
5	3	Tasha Danvers	England	56.39	
6	5	Vicki Jamison	Northern Ireland	56.62	
7	7	Mary-Estelle Kapalu	Vanuatu	59.87	
