= 1994 World Junior Championships in Athletics – Women's 400 metres hurdles =

The women's 400 metres hurdles event at the 1994 World Junior Championships in Athletics was held in Lisbon, Portugal, at Estádio Universitário de Lisboa on 21 and 22 July.

== Medalists ==
Gold	Ionela Tîrlea; Romania
Silver	Virna De Angeli; Italy
Bronze	Emma Holmqvist; Sweden

== Results ==
=== Final ===
22 July

Rank	Name	Nationality	Time	Notes
1st place, gold medalist(s)	Ionela Tîrlea	Romania	56.25	
2nd place, silver medalist(s)	Virna De Angeli	Italy	56.93	
3rd place, bronze medalist(s)	Emma Holmqvist	Sweden	57.23	
4	Zhu Wei	China	58.10	
5	Rebecca Campbell	Australia	58.60	
6	Kelly de Oliveira	Brazil	59.15	
7	Claudia Salvarani	Italy	59.39	
8	Ikiko Yamagata	Japan	59.39	

=== Heats ===
21 July

==== Heat 1 ====
Rank	Name	Nationality	Time	Notes
1	Zhu Wei	China	58.59	Q
2	Virna De Angeli	Italy	59.23	Q
3	Tanya Jarrett	Jamaica	59.64	
4	Rikke Rønholt	Denmark	59.97	
5	Yvonne Harrison	United States	61.22	
6	Adri van der Merwe	South Africa	61.44	
7	Kate Myers	Australia	62.79	
8	Allison Curbishley	United Kingdom	66.68	

==== Heat 2 ====
Rank	Name	Nationality	Time	Notes
1	Rebecca Campbell	Australia	59.44	Q
2	Kelly de Oliveira	Brazil	60.14	Q
3	Svetlana Badrankova	Kazakhstan	60.44	
4	Mayuko Hiro	Japan	60.47	
5	Char Foster	United States	60.84	
6	Amina Belkrochi	Morocco	61.77	
7	Wang Pei-shun	Chinese Taipei	61.92	
8	Andrea Blackett	Barbados	63.52	

==== Heat 3 ====
Rank	Name	Nationality	Time	Notes
1	Ionela Tîrlea	Romania	57.45	Q
2	Emma Holmqvist	Sweden	58.04	Q
3	Ikiko Yamagata	Japan	58.50	q
4	Claudia Salvarani	Italy	58.82	q
5	Ronelle Ullrich	South Africa	59.04	
6	Sonia Bernard	France	60.80	
7	Yulia Bavilskaya	Russia	61.81	
8	Cui Xiuzhong	China	64.67	

== Participation ==
According to an unofficial count, 24 athletes from 18 countries participated in the event.

- Australia (2)
- Barbados (1)
- Brazil (1)
- China (2)
- Chinese Taipei (1)
- Denmark (1)
- France (1)
- Italy (2)
- Jamaica (1)
- Japan (2)
- Kazakhstan (1)
- Morocco (1)
- Romania (1)
- Russia (1)
- South Africa (2)
- Sweden (1)
- United Kingdom (1)
- United States (2)
