= Athletics at the 2007 Pan American Games – Women's 400 metres hurdles =

Women's 400 metres hurdles at the Pan American Games

The women's 400 metres hurdles event at the 2007 Pan American Games was held on July 23–25.

== Medalists ==
Gold	Silver	Bronze
Sheena Johnson; United States	Nickiesha Wilson; Jamaica	Nicole Leach; United States

== Results ==
=== Heats ===
Qualification: First 3 of each heat (Q) and the next 2 fastest (q) qualified for the final.

Rank	Heat	Name	Nationality	Time	Notes
1	2	Sheena Johnson	United States	55.55	Q
2	1	Nicole Leach	United States	55.77	Q
3	2	Shevon Stoddart	Jamaica	56.40	Q
4	1	Nickiesha Wilson	Jamaica	56.44	Q
5	2	Andrea Blackett	Barbados	56.54	Q
6	1	Lucimar Teodoro	Brazil	56.99	Q
7	1	Daimí Pernía	Cuba	57.45	q
8	2	Janeil Bellille	Trinidad and Tobago	57.71	q
9	2	Higlecia Oliveira	Brazil	58.53	
10	1	Daisy Ugarte	Bolivia	1:00.26	PB
11	1	Lucy Jaramillo	Ecuador	1:00.30	
12	2	Paola Sánchez	Ecuador	1:01.59	

=== Final ===
Rank	Lane	Name	Nationality	Time	Notes
1st place, gold medalist(s)	4	Sheena Johnson	United States	54.64	
2nd place, silver medalist(s)	5	Nickiesha Wilson	Jamaica	54.94	PB
3rd place, bronze medalist(s)	6	Nicole Leach	United States	54.97	
4	3	Shevon Stoddart	Jamaica	55.42	SB
5	7	Andrea Blackett	Barbados	56.02	
6	2	Lucimar Teodoro	Brazil	56.58	
7	8	Janeil Bellille	Trinidad and Tobago	57.42	
8	1	Daimí Pernía	Cuba	59.71	
