= 2002 European Athletics Championships – Women's 400 metres hurdles =

Women's 400 metres hurdles at the European Athletics Championships
- Venue: Olympic Stadium
- Location: Munich, Germany
- Dates: 7 and 8 August 2002

Medalists
| gold medal | Ionela Târlea | Romania |
| silver medal | Heike Meißner | Germany |
| bronze medal | Anna Olichwierczuk | Poland |

The women's 400 metres hurdles at the 2002 European Athletics Championships were held at the Olympic Stadium on August 7–8.

== Medalists ==
| Gold | Silver | Bronze |
|---|---|---|
| Ionela Târlea; Romania | Heike Meißner; Germany | Anna Olichwierczuk; Poland |

== Results ==
=== Heats ===
Qualification: First 2 of each heat (Q) and the next 2 fastest qualified for the final.

| Rank | Heat | Name | Nationality | Time | Notes |
|---|---|---|---|---|---|
| 1 | 1 | Ionela Târlea | Romania | 55.57 | Q, SB |
| 2 | 1 | Heike Meißner | Germany | 55.67 | Q, SB |
| 3 | 2 | Anna Olichwierczuk | Poland | 55.93 | Q |
| 4 | 1 | Monika Niederstätter | Italy | 56.05 | q, SB |
| 5 | 3 | Yekaterina Bakhvalova | Russia | 56.15 | Q |
| 6 | 3 | Małgorzata Pskit | Poland | 56.31 | Q |
| 7 | 1 | Natasha Danvers | Great Britain | 56.55 | q |
| 8 | 2 | Sinead Dudgeon | Great Britain | 56.91 | Q |
| 9 | 2 | Tetyana Debela | Ukraine | 56.93 | |
| 10 | 1 | Marjolein de Jong | Netherlands | 57.00 | SB |
| 11 | 2 | Ann Mercken | Belgium | 57.02 | |
| 12 | 3 | Sylvanie Morandais | France | 57.04 | |
| 13 | 2 | Nadja Petersen | Sweden | 57.09 | |
| 14 | 3 | Benedetta Ceccarelli | Italy | 57.24 | |
| 15 | 3 | Tracey Duncan | Great Britain | 57.54 | |
| 16 | 3 | Miriam Hrdličková | Slovakia | 57.88 | |
| 17 | 2 | Carmo Tavares | Portugal | 57.90 | |
| 18 | 1 | Alena Rücklová | Czech Republic | 57.91 | |
| 19 | 2 | Lara Rocco | Italy | 58.05 | |
| 20 | 3 | Erica Mårtensson | Sweden | 58.49 | |

=== Final ===
| Rank | Name | Nationality | Time | Notes |
|---|---|---|---|---|
| 1st place, gold medalist(s) | Ionela Târlea | Romania | 54.95 | |
| 2nd place, silver medalist(s) | Heike Meißner | Germany | 55.89 | |
| 3rd place, bronze medalist(s) | Anna Olichwierczuk | Poland | 56.18 | |
| 4 | Monika Niederstätter | Italy | 56.34 | |
| 5 | Yekaterina Bakhvalova | Russia | 56.39 | |
| 6 | Małgorzata Pskit | Poland | 56.78 | |
| 7 | Natasha Danvers | Great Britain | 56.93 | |
| 8 | Sinead Dudgeon | Great Britain | 59.39 | |
