= Andrea Blackett =

Barbadian hurdler (born 1976)

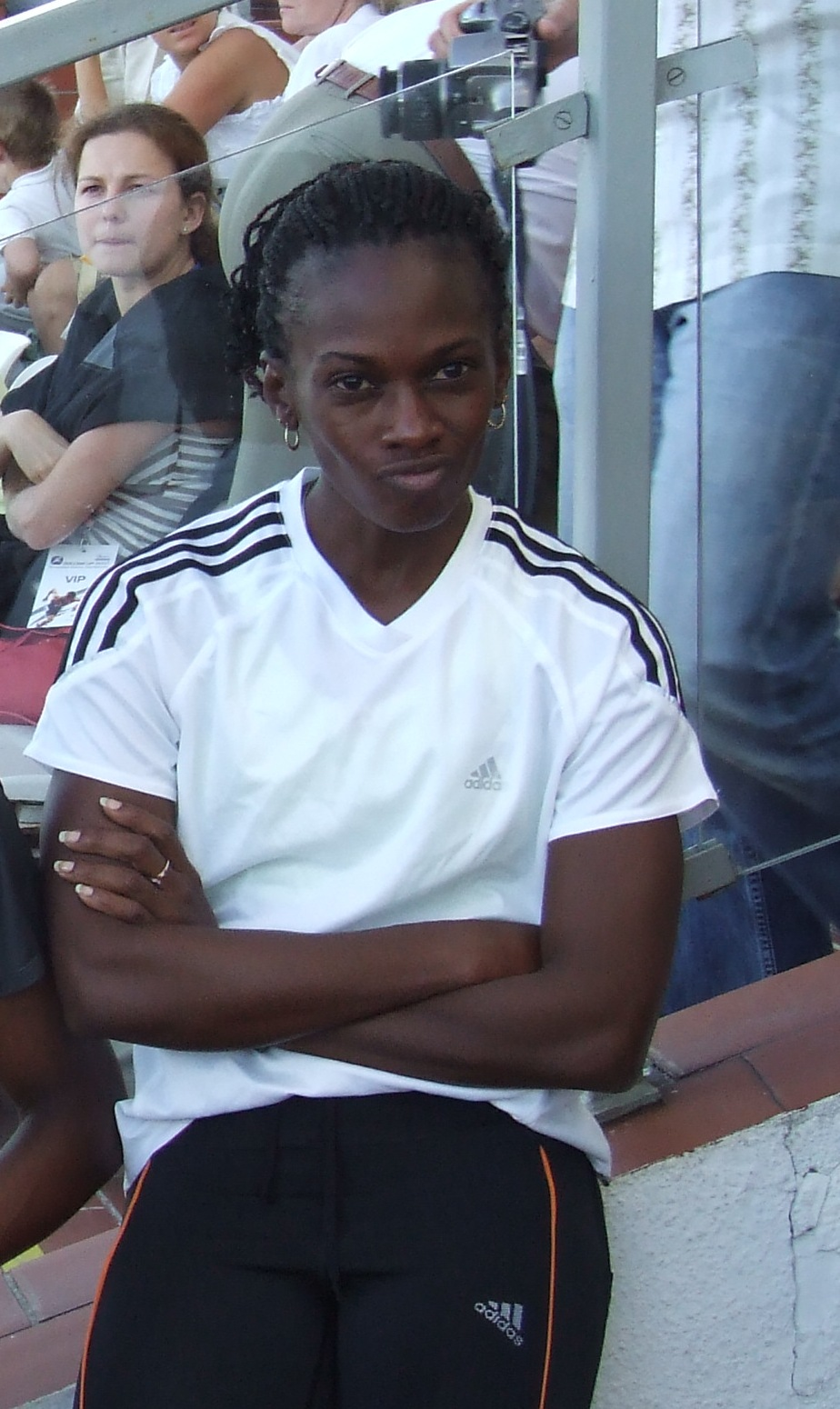
- Blackett in 2007

Personal information
- Born: 24 January 1976 (age 50) London, Great Britain

Sport
- Sport: Track and field
Medal record
Representing Barbados
Commonwealth Games
| Gold medal – first place | 1998 Kuala Lumpur | 400m hurdles |
Pan American Games
| Silver medal – second place | 1999 Winnipeg | 400m hurdles |
| Bronze medal – third place | 1999 Winnipeg | 4x400m relay |
| Bronze medal – third place | 2003 Santo Domingo | 400m hurdles |
Central American and Caribbean Games
| Silver medal – second place | 1998 Maracaibo | 400m hurdles |
| Bronze medal – third place | 1998 Maracaibo | 4x400m relay |

Andrea Melissa Blackett (born 24 January 1976) is a Barbadian athlete who specializes in the 400 metres hurdles. She is also a women's track assistant coach at her alma mater, Rice University.

Her greatest achievement in athletics is the gold medal she won in the 400 metres hurdles at the 1998 Commonwealth Games in Kuala Lumpur in a games record time. Blackett was awarded the Barbados Service Star and the 1998 National Sports Personality of the Year award for Barbados for this achievement.

Blackett represented Barbados in six IAAF World Championships (1997–2007). She qualified for the final four times and in 1999 finished fourth. She competed in the 2000 Sydney Olympics, qualifying for the semi-final of the 400m hurdles and she competed in the 400m hurdles at the 2004 Athens Olympics. Andrea even competed in Edmonton in 2001 and also in Paris in 2003 where she earned sixth place. She has also represented her country at the World Indoor Athletics Championships.

She also has five medals from the Central American and Caribbean Championships and three from the Central American and Caribbean Games. Blackett has a personal best of 53.36 in the 400m hurdles, in Seville which is also a national record for Barbados. She set the Barbados 100m hurdles record of 13.39 in 2003 in Liège.

== Career ==
Andrea's 4x400 meter time in the Indoor National Track and Field events led the Rice Owls to their first ever national title win in 1997. Her highest individual finish came in a second-place effort in the 400 metres hurdles in 1997. Blackett graduated from Rice University in 1997 with a bachelor's degree in managerial studies and Spanish, and she also holds a master's degree from the University of Houston in hotel management.

She also competed in the 2002 Commonwealth Games in Manchester but was unable to retain her title. Blackett featured in the 2003 documentary Running for God which followed her efforts to win at the games alongside fellow hurdlers Deon Hemmings and Natasha Danvers, and how their Christian faith influenced their careers.

Blackett was also selected in the Bajan team for the 2008 Olympics but was ruled out due to injury and retired from international competition.

=== Coaching ===
Blackett has now finished her days of running but it hasn't stopped her from coaching for the Rice University's Women's Track Team as well as previously coaching for Barbados in the 2008 Beijing Olympic games.

Coach Blackett continued her NCAA Division I coaching career at UCLA Bruins track and field in 2016-2017. Coach Blackett coached eight years (2017-2024) as an assistant coach for Azusa Pacific University. APU won 2021 and 2023 NCAA Division II women's outdoor track and field championships two team NCAA Division II Championships, and 16 (out of 16) Pacific West Conference men and women team outdoor track and field championships.

== International competitions ==
| Year | Competition | Venue | Position | Event | Notes |
Representing Barbados
| 1992 | CARIFTA Games (U-17) | Nassau, Bahamas | 5th | 400 m | 58.04 |
| 1993 | CARIFTA Games (U-20) | Fort-de-France, Martinique | 4th | 400 m | 56.40 |
| 1993 | CARIFTA Games (U-20) | Fort-de-France, Martinique | 6th | 4 × 100 m relay | 47.79 |
| 1993 | CARIFTA Games (U-20) | Fort-de-France, Martinique | 3rd | 4 × 400 m relay | 3:52.48 |
| 1994 | CARIFTA Games (U-20) | Bridgetown, Barbados | 6th | 400 m | 56.09 |
| 1994 | CARIFTA Games (U-20) | Bridgetown, Barbados | 2nd | 400 m hurdles | 61.29 |
| 1994 | CARIFTA Games (U-20) | Bridgetown, Barbados | 3rd | 4 × 400 m relay | 3:42.54 |
| 1994 | CAC Junior Championships (U-20) | Port of Spain, Trinidad and Tobago | 3rd | 400 m hurdles | 62.1 |
| 1994 | World Junior Championships | Lisbon, Portugal | 22nd (h) | 400m hurdles | 63.52 |
| 1995 | CARIFTA Games (U-20) | George Town, Cayman Islands | 2nd | 400 m hurdles | 59.80 |
| 1995 | CARIFTA Games (U-20) | George Town, Cayman Islands | 3rd | 4 × 400 m relay | 3:40.16 |
| 1997 | Central American and Caribbean Championships | San Juan, Puerto Rico | 1st | 400 m hurdles | 55.64 CR |
| 1997 | World Championships | Athens, Greece | 8th | 400 m hurdles | 55.63 |
| 1998 | Central American and Caribbean Games | Maracaibo, Venezuela | 2nd | 400 m hurdles | 54.61 |
| 1998 | Central American and Caribbean Games | Maracaibo, Venezuela | 3rd | 4 × 400 m relay | 3:31.91 |
| 1998 | Commonwealth Games | Kuala Lumpur, Malaysia | 1st | 400 m hurdles | 53.91 |
| 1998 | Commonwealth Games | Kuala Lumpur, Malaysia | – | 4 × 400 m relay | DNF |
| 1999 | Central American and Caribbean Championships | Bridgetown, Barbados | 1st | 400 m hurdles | 56.87 |
| 1999 | Pan American Games | Winnipeg, Canada | 2nd | 400 m hurdles | 53.98 |
| 1999 | Pan American Games | Winnipeg, Canada | 3rd | 4 × 400 m relay | 3:30.72 |
| 1999 | World Championships | Seville, Spain | 4th | 400 m hurdles | 53.36 NR |
| 1999 | World Championships | Seville, Spain | 3rd (h) | 4 × 400 m relay | 3:34.37 |
| 2000 | Olympic Games | Sydney, Australia | 7th (sf) | 400 m hurdles | 55.30 |
| 2001 | World Championships | Edmonton, Canada | 5th (h) | 400 m hurdles | 57.10 |
| 2003 | Central American and Caribbean Championships | St. George's, Grenada | 3rd | 400 m hurdles | 56.12 |
| 2003 | Pan American Games | Santo Domingo, Dominican Republic | 3rd | 400 m hurdles | 55.24 |
| 2003 | World Championships | Paris, France | 6th | 400 m hurdles | 54.79 |
| 2003 | World Athletics Final | Monte Carlo, Monaco | 2nd | 400 m hurdles | 54.28 |
| 2004 | Olympic Games | Athens, Greece | 6th (h) | 400 m hurdles | 56.49 |
| 2005 | Central American and Caribbean Championships | Nassau, Bahamas | 2nd | 400 m hurdles | 56.47 |
| 2005 | World Championships | Helsinki, Finland | 6th | 400 m hurdles | 55.06 |
| 2005 | World Athletics Final | Monte Carlo, Monaco | 5th | 400 m hurdles | 55.25 |
| 2007 | Pan American Games | Rio de Janeiro, Brazil | 5th | 400 m hurdles | 56.02 |
| 2007 | World Championships | Osaka, Japan | 5th (h) | 400 m hurdles | 57.70 |

== Personal bests ==
- 400 metres - 54.01 s (2006)
- 400 metres hurdles - 53.36 s (1999)
- 100 metres hurdles - 13.17 s (2000)
