= 1999 USA Outdoor Track and Field Championships =

- Host city: Eugene, Oregon, United States
- Venue: Hayward Field
- Events: 36

The 1999 USA Outdoor Track and Field Championships took place between June 24–27 at Hayward Field in Eugene, Oregon. The competition acted as a way of selecting the United States team for the 1999 World Championships in Athletics in Seville, Spain August 20–29 later that year.

== Results ==
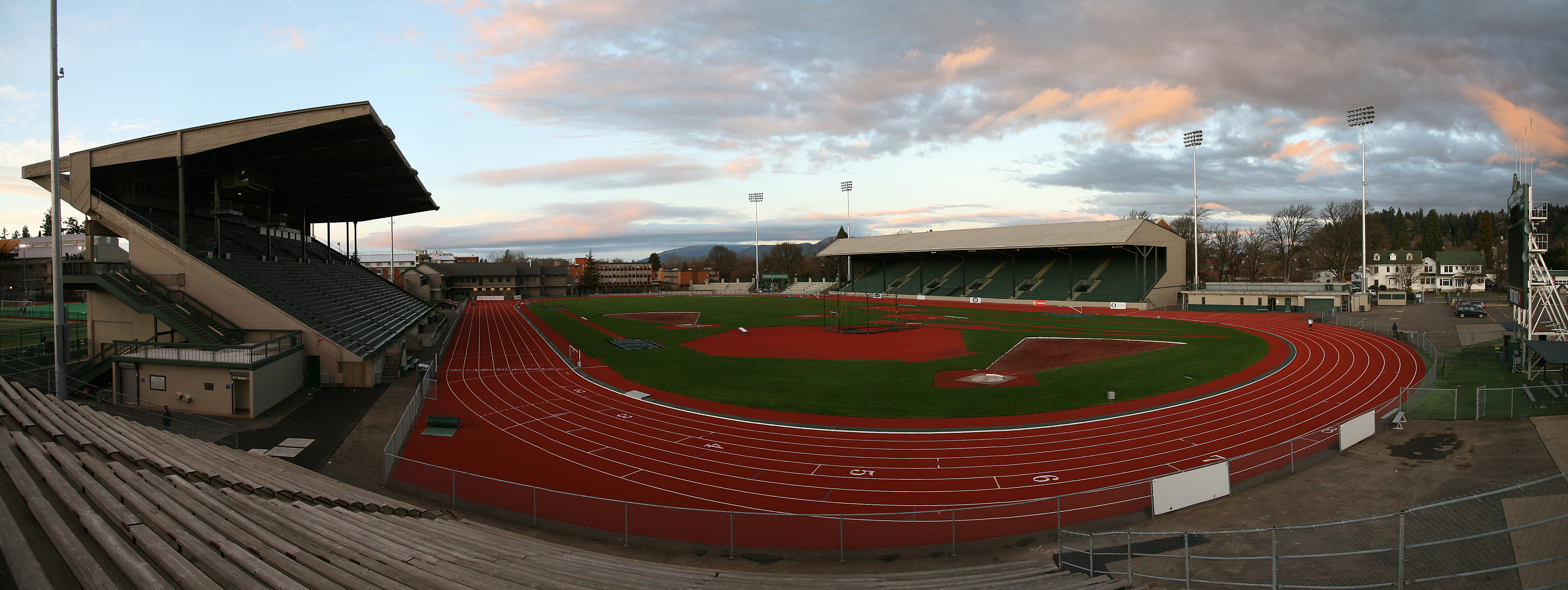
Hayward Field hosted the 1999 competition

=== Men track events ===
Event	Gold		Silver		Bronze	
100 m Wind : +2.3 m/s	Dennis Mitchell	9.97w	Brian Lewis	10.00w	Tim Montgomery	10.00w
200 m Wind : +2.3 m/s	Maurice Greene	19.93w	Rohsaan Griffin	19.98w	Kevin Little	20.19w
400 m	Jerome Young	44.24	Antonio Pettigrew	44.59	Jerome Davis	44.91
800 m	Khadevis Robinson	1:45.92	Bryan Woodward	1:46.08	Rich Kenah	1:46.13
1500 m	Steve Holman	3:39.21	Seneca Lassiter	3:39.23	Matt Holthaus	3:39.57
5000 m	Adam Goucher	13:25.59	Bob Kennedy	13:26.85	Dan Browne	13:36.64
10,000 m	Alan Culpepper	28:22.46	Brad Hauser	28:24.32	Abdihakem Abdirahman	28:28.26
Marathon	Alfredo Vigueras	2:14:20	de:Eddy Hellebuyck	2:16:58	Stephen Swift	2:17:27
3000 m steeplechase	Pascal Dobert	8:21.48	Robert Gary	8:22.19	Francis O'Neill	8:22.51
20 km walk	Curt Clausen	1:23:34	Tim Seaman	1:23:42	Jonathan Matthews	1:24:50
110 m hurdles Wind : +2.4 m/s	Mark Crear	13.09w	Allen Johnson	13.15w	Tony Dees	13.19w
400 m hurdles	Angelo Taylor	48.49	Joey Woody	48.61	Torrance Zellner	48.79

=== Men field events ===
Event	Gold		Silver		Bronze	
High jump	Charles Austin	2.28 m (7 ft 5 3/4 in)	Henry Patterson	2.25 m (7 ft 4 1/2 in)	Charles Clinger	2.25 m (7 ft 4 1/2 in)
Pole vault	Jeff Hartwig	6.02 m (19 ft 9 in) AR	Nick Hysong	5.65 m (18 ft 6 1/4 in)	Pat Manson	5.65 m (18 ft 6 1/4 in)
Long jump	Kevin Dilworth	8.12 m (26 ft 7 1/2 in)w	Erick Walder	8.08 m (26 ft 6 in)w	Savanté Stringfellow	7.94 m (26 ft 1/2 in)w
Triple jump	Lamark Carter	17.15 m (56 ft 3 in)w	Desmond Hunt	16.35 m (53 ft 7 1/2 in)	Von Ware	16.30 m (53 ft 5 1/2 in)
Shot put	John Godina	22.02 m (72 ft 2 3/4 in)	C. J. Hunter	21.09 m (69 ft 2 1/4 in)	Kevin Toth	20.40 m (66 ft 11 in)
Discus throw	Anthony Washington	67.94 m (222 ft 10 3/4 in)	John Godina	66.62 m (218 ft 6 3/4 in)	Andrew Bloom	65.25 m (214 ft 3/4 in)
Hammer throw	Lance Deal	80.34 m (263 ft 6 3/4 in)	Kevin McMahon	74.98 m (245 ft 11 3/4 in)	Jud Logan	73.10 m (239 ft 9 3/4 in)
Javelin throw	Tom Pukstys	78.03 m (256 ft 0 in)	Tom Petranoff	5.21 m (17 ft 1 in)	Oscar Duncan	74.01 m (242 ft 9 3/4 in)
Decathlon	Chris Huffins	8350	Tom Pappas	8187	Dan Steele	7938

=== Women track events ===
Event	Gold		Silver		Bronze	
100 m Wind : +2.5 m/s	Inger Miller	10.96w	Gail Devers	10.97w	Angela Williams	11.03w
200 m Wind : +2.0 m/s	Marion Jones	22.10	LaTasha Jenkins	22.36	Inger Miller	22.46
400 m	Maicel Malone	51.29	Suziann Reid	51.38	Michelle Collins	51.45
800 m	Jearl Miles Clark	1:59.47	Meredith Valmon	2:00.36	Kathy Rounds	2:00.71
1500 m	Regina Jacobs	4:02.41 MR	Stephanie Best	4:08.53	Shayne Culpepper	4:08.69
5000 m	Regina Jacobs	15:24.80	Cheri Kenah	15:26.60	Elva Dryer	15:27.26
10,000 m	Deena Kastor	31:51.05	Jen Rhines	31:58.34	Libbie Hickman	31:58.68
3000 m steeplechase	Elizabeth Jackson	10:07.23	Lisa Nye	10:12.66	Joan Nesbit	10:18.55
20 km walk	Michelle Rohl	1:33:17 AR, MR	Joanne Dow	1:35:01	Susan Armenta	1:37:04
100 m hurdles Wind : +2.2 m/s	Gail Devers	12.54w	Miesha McKelvy	12.67w	Andria King	12.73w
400 m hurdles	Sandra Glover	54.95	Michelle Johnson	55.53	Joanna Hayes	55.76

=== Women field events ===
Event	Gold		Silver		Bronze	
High jump	Tisha Waller	1.99 m (6 ft 6 1/4 in) MR	Amy Acuff	1.93 m (6 ft 3 3/4 in)	Karol Rovelto	1.93 m (6 ft 3 3/4 in)
Pole vault	Stacy Dragila	4.45 m (14 ft 7 in) MR	Kellie Suttle	4.30 m (14 ft 1 1/4 in)	Melissa Price	4.20 m (13 ft 9 1/4 in)
Long jump	Dawn Burrell	6.96 m (22 ft 10 in)	Marion Jones	6.78 m (22 ft 2 3/4 in)	Shana Williams	6.71 m (22 ft 0 in)w
Triple jump	Stacey Bowers	13.66 m (44 ft 9 3/4 in)	Tiombé Hurd	13.52 m (44 ft 4 1/4 in)	Cynthea Rhodes	13.33 m (43 ft 8 3/4 in)
Shot put	Connie Price-Smith	18.86 m (61 ft 10 1/2 in)	Teri Steer	18.80 m (61 ft 8 in)	Tressa Thompson	18.72 m (61 ft 5 in)
Discus throw	Seilala Sua	62.08 m (203 ft 8 in)	Kris Kuehl	60.89 m (199 ft 9 in)	Aretha Hill	59.09 m (193 ft 10 1/4 in)
Hammer throw	Dawn Ellerbe	64.75 m (212 ft 5 in) MR	Tamika Powell	64.26 m (210 ft 9 3/4 in)	Windy Dean	64.03 m (210 ft 3/4 in)
Javelin throw	Lynda Blutreich	55.53 m (182 ft 2 in) MR	Cassi Morelock	53.36 m (175 ft 3/4 in)	Ann Crouse	52.93 m (173 ft 7 3/4 in)
Heptathlon	Shelia Burrell	6101	Tiffany Lott-Hogan	6026	Nicole Haynes	5720

== Byes ==
American athletes with byes to the 1999 Championships as 1997 Champions:

- Maurice Greene 100 meters and he repeated as 1999 World Champion
- Michael Johnson 400 meters and he repeated as 1999 World Champion
- Allen Johnson 110 meters hurdles Because Johnson competed and was in a qualifying position, 4th place Duane Ross was selected to the World Championships where he won a bronze medal
- John Godina Shot put Because Godina competed and was in a qualifying position, 4th place Andy Bloom was selected to the World Championships
- Marion Jones 100 meters and she repeated as 1999 World Champion. Unlike her Olympic medals the following year, this result has not been disqualified due to her admission of taking performance enhancing drugs, part of the BALCO scandal

== See also ==
- United States Olympic Trials (track and field)
