= Daimí Pernía =

Cuban hurdler

Personal information
- Full name: Daimí Perniá Figueroa
- Nickname: La Nena
- Born: December 27, 1976 (age 49) La Palma, Pinar del Río
- Height: 1.78 m (5 ft 10 in)
- Weight: 66 kg (146 lb)

Sport
- Country: Cuba
- Sport: Track and field
Medal record
Women's Athletics
Representing Cuba
World Championships
Gold medal – first place	1999 Seville	400 m hurdles
Bronze medal – third place	2001 Edmonton	400 m hurdles
Pan American Games
Gold medal – first place	1999 Winnipeg	400 m hurdles
Silver medal – second place	2003 Santo Domingo	400 m hurdles
Summer Universiade
Gold medal – first place	1999 Palma de Mallorca	400 m hurdles
Silver medal – second place	1997 Catania	4x400 m relay
Bronze medal – third place	1997 Catania	400 m hurdles
- Updated on 12 June 2013

Daimí Pernía Figueroa (born December 27, 1976) is a retired Cuban athlete competing mainly in 400 m hurdles. A former basketball player, she did not rise to international level until 1999, when she lowered her personal best from 55.51s to 52.89s and even became world champion. She announced her retirement in 2007.

== Personal bests ==
- 200 m: 23.43 s (wind: +1.8 m/s) – (Cuba) Camagüey, 27 February 1999
- 400 m: 51.10 s – (Spain) Getafe, 10 July 2001
- 100 m hurdles: 14.31 s – Santiago de Cuba, 4 May 1992
- 400 m hurdles: 52.89 s – (Spain) Sevilla, 25 August 1999

== Achievements ==
Year	Competition	Venue	Position	Event	Notes
Representing Cuba
1993	Pan American Junior Championships	Winnipeg, Canada	5th (h)	400 m	56.83 s
1993	Pan American Junior Championships	Winnipeg, Canada	3rd	4 × 100 m relay	45.84 s
1993	Pan American Junior Championships	Winnipeg, Canada	7th	4 × 400 m relay	3:59.81 min
1994	World Junior Championships	Lisbon, Portugal	11th (sf)	400m	54.09 s
1994	World Junior Championships	Lisbon, Portugal	9th (h)	4 × 100 m relay	46.27 s
1994	World Junior Championships	Lisbon, Portugal	7th	4 × 400 m relay	3:37.95 min
1995	Central American and Caribbean Championships	Ciudad de Guatemala, Guatemala	1st	4 × 400 m relay	3:27.86 min A
1997	Central American and Caribbean Championships	San Juan, Puerto Rico	2nd	400 m hurdles	56.14 s
1997	Central American and Caribbean Championships	San Juan, Puerto Rico	3rd	4 × 100 m relay	44.73 s
1997	Universiade	Catania, Italy	3rd	400 m hurdles	56.13 s
1997	Universiade	Catania, Italy	2nd	4 × 400 m relay	3:29.00 min
1999	Universiade	Palma de Mallorca, Spain	1st	400 m hurdles	53.95 s
1999	Pan American Games	Winnipeg, Canada	1st	400 m hurdles	53.44 s
1999	Pan American Games	Winnipeg, Canada	1st	4 × 400 m relay	3:26.70 min
1999	World Championships	Sevilla, Spain	1st	400 m hurdles	52.89 s
2000	Olympic Games	Sydney, Australia	4th	400 m	53.68 s
2000	Olympic Games	Sydney, Australia	8th	4 × 400 m relay	3:29.47 min
2001	World Championships	Edmonton, Canada	3rd	400 m hurdles	54.51 s
2001	World Championships	Edmonton, Canada	9th (h)	4 × 400 m relay	3:28.68 min
2003	Pan American Games	Santo Domingo, Dominican Republic	2nd	400 m hurdles	55.10 s
2004	Ibero-American Championships	Huelva, Spain	1st	400 m hurdles	54.84 s
2004	Olympic Games	Athens, Greece	20th (h)	400 m hurdles	55.91 s
2006	Central American and Caribbean Games	Cartagena, Colombia	1st	400 m hurdles	55.32 s
2006	Central American and Caribbean Games	Cartagena, Colombia	3rd	4 × 400 m relay	3:36.34 min
2007	ALBA Games	Caracas, Venezuela	1st	400 m hurdles	56.98 s
2007	ALBA Games	Caracas, Venezuela	1st	4 × 400 m relay	3:38.77 min
2007	Pan American Games	Rio de Janeiro, Brazil	8th	400 m hurdles	59.71 s
2007	Pan American Games	Rio de Janeiro, Brazil	1st	4 × 400 m relay	3:27.51 min
2007	World Championships	Osaka, Japan	7th	4 × 400 m relay	3:27.05 min

Sporting positions
Preceded by (United States) Kim Batten	Women's 400m Hurdles Best Year Performance; 1999	Succeeded by (Russia) Irina Privalova
