= Fani Chalkia =

Greek hurdler

Personal information
- Native name: Φανή Χαλκιά
- Born: 2 February 1979 (age 47) Larissa, Greece

Sport
- Country: Greece
- Sport: Athletics
- Event: 400 metres hurdles

Achievements and titles
- Highest world ranking: 1st
- Personal best: 52.77 sec
Medal record
Olympic Games
Gold medal – first place	2004 Athens	400 m hurdles
European Championships
Silver medal – second place	2006 Gothenburg	400 m hurdles

Fani Chalkia (Greek: Φανή Χαλκιά, [faˈni xalˈca], born 2 February 1979), also transliterated as Halkia or Khalkia, is a retired Greek hurdler. She won an Olympic gold medal in the women's 400 m hurdles at the 2004 Summer Olympics.

== Biography ==
Chalkia was born near the city of Larissa on 2 February 1979.

=== 2004 Olympics ===
At the 2004 Summer Olympics in Athens Chalkia participated in the women's 400 m hurdles. During the semifinals she set a new Olympic record in the event, which was the sixth fastest time ever. In the final she finished in 52.82 seconds, winning the gold medal more than half a second ahead of second-placed Ionela Târlea and bronze medallist Tetyana Tereshchuk-Antipova.

=== 2008 Olympics ===
On 16 August 2008, during the 2008 Summer Olympics in Beijing it was announced that she had tested positive for the banned substance methyltrienolone. Chalkia denied she had taken any banned substance, and asked for her 'B' sample to be tested, which also tested positive the next day. On 26 November 2008, the Greek Athletics Federation announced that she would serve a two-year ban from the sport effective from August when Chalkia was expelled from the 2008 Summer Olympics.

=== Doping conviction ===
In 2015, a Greek court convicted Chalkia of intentional doping and handed her a seven-month jail sentence, suspended pending an appeal; this appeal was successful as on 19 February 2016, Chalkia was unanimously acquitted by the Athens Court of Appeal of all charges for the intentional use of banned substances. The court ruled that the former champion had fallen victim to a circuit of adulterated drugs, and also acquitted her trainer Giorgos Panagiotopoulos, who was facing charges of intentionally supplying banned substances.

== Personal bests ==
Date	Event	Venue	Performance
22 August 2004	400 meters hurdles	Athens, Greece	52.77 s (OR)
12 September 2004	400 meters	Berlin, Germany	50.56 s (NR)
6 March 2004	400 meters (indoor)	Budapest, Hungary	51.68 s (NR)
24 June 2007	200 meters	Munich, Germany	23.30 s

Sporting positions
Preceded by (Russia) Yuliya Pechonkina	Women's 400 m Hurdles Best Year Performance; 2004	Succeeded by (Russia) Yuliya Pechonkina
