= Małgorzata Pskit =

Polish sprinter and hurdler

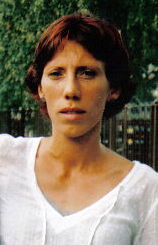

Personal information
- Nationality: Polish
- Born: 25 May 1976 (age 50) Łódź, Poland
- Height: 1.75 m (5 ft 9 in)
- Weight: 61 kg (134 lb)

Sport
- Sport: Athletics
- Events: 400 m, 400 m hurdles
Medal record
Representing Poland
Women's athletics
European Championships
Bronze medal – third place	2002 Munich	4x400 m
European Indoor Championships
Silver medal – second place	2005 Madrid	4x400 m

Małgorzata Pskit (born 25 May 1976, in Łódź) is a retired Polish athlete specializing in the 400 metres hurdles.

== Life ==
She was born in Łódź in 1976 and she took her degree at the University of Łódź. She was the top champion at her event in 1998, 2001 and 2004.

== Competition record ==
Year	Competition	Venue	Position	Event	Notes
Representing Poland
1997	European U23 Championships	Turku, Finland	3rd	400 m hurdles	57.68
2001	World Championships	Edmonton, Canada	9th (sf)	400 m hurdles	55.28
2001	World Championships	Edmonton, Canada	7th	4 × 400 m relay	3:27.78
2001	Universiade	Beijing, China	2nd	400 m hurdles	55.27
2002	European Championships	Munich, Germany	6th	400 m hurdles	56.78
2002	European Championships	Munich, Germany	3rd	4 × 400 m	3:26.15
2003	World Championships	Paris, France	15th (sf)	400 m hurdles	56.21
2003	World Championships	Paris, France	5th	4 × 400 m relay	3:26.64
2004	World Indoor Championships	Budapest, Hungary	4th	4 × 400 m relay	3:30.52 (iNR)
2004	Olympic Games	Athens, Greece	13th (sf)	400 m hurdles	55.24
2004	Olympic Games	Athens, Greece	5th	4 × 400 m relay	3:25.22
2005	European Indoor Championships	Madrid, Spain	9th (h)	400 m	53.23
2005	European Indoor Championships	Madrid, Spain	2nd	4 × 400 m relay	3:29.37 (iNR)
2005	World Championships	Helsinki, Finland	8th	400 m hurdles	55.58
2006	World Indoor Championships	Moscow, Russia	4th	4 × 400 m relay	3:28.95 (iNR)

== Personal bests ==
Outdoor

- 200m 24.86
- 400m 53.10 (Sopot 2002)
- 400m hurdles 54.75 (Athens 2004)
- 800m 2:04.88

Indoor

- 400m 53.23 (Madrid 2005)
- 600m 1:29.93 (Spała 2003)
- 800m 2:02.65 (Spała 2005)
