= Yuliya Pechonkina =

Russian sprinter and hurdler

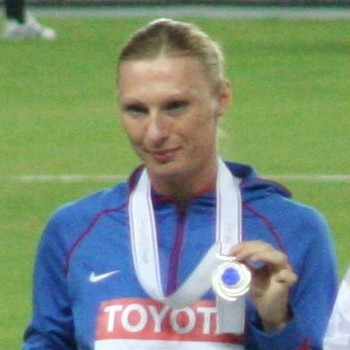
- Pechonkina in Osaka 2007

Personal information
- Born: 21 April 1978 (age 48) Krasnoyarsk, Soviet Union

Sport
- Country: Russia
- Sport: Women's athletics
Medal record
World Championships
| Gold medal – first place | 2005 Helsinki | 400 m hurdles |
| Gold medal – first place | 2005 Helsinki | 4 × 400 m |
| Silver medal – second place | 2001 Edmonton | 400 m hurdles |
| Silver medal – second place | 2003 Paris | 4 × 400 m |
| Silver medal – second place | 2007 Osaka | 400 m hurdles |
| Bronze medal – third place | 2001 Edmonton | 4 × 400 m |
| Bronze medal – third place | 2003 Paris | 400 m hurdles |
World Indoor Championships
| Gold medal – first place | 2001 Lisbon | 4 × 400 m |
| Gold medal – first place | 2003 Birmingham | 4 × 400 m |
European Indoor Championships
| Gold medal – first place | 2005 Madrid | 4 × 400 m |

Yuliya Sergeyevna Pechonkina, née Nosova (Russian: Юлия Серге́евна Печёнкина, born 21 April 1978 in Krasnoyarsk) is a Russian former athlete who specialized in the 400 metres hurdles and 4 × 400 metres relay. She was previously married to former sprinter Evgeny Pechonkin.

She held the world record in 400 m hurdles (52.34 seconds achieved on 8 August 2003 in Tula) for almost 16 years until it was broken by Dalilah Muhammad on 28 July 2019 and the rarely contested 4 × 200 metres relay indoor (1:32.41 with Yekaterina Kondratyeva, Irina Khabarova and Yuliya Gushchina).

She had a recurring problem with sinusitis, an illness which caused her to miss both the 2008 Beijing Olympics and the 2009 World Championships in Berlin. Given her ill health, she decided to retire from athletics soon after the World Championships and instead took a job in the banking sector.

She has an annual meet held in Yerino named after her, under the title Yuliya Pechonkina Prizes.

== International competitions ==
Representing Russia
| Year | Competition | Venue | Position | Event | Notes |
|---|---|---|---|---|---|
| 1996 | World Junior Championships | Sydney, Australia | — | 400 m hurdles | DNF |
| 1996 | World Junior Championships | Sydney, Australia | 6th | 4 × 400 m relay | 3:37.34 |
| 2000 | Olympic Games | Sydney, Australia | 16th (sf) | 400 m hurdles | 56.58 |
| 2001 | World Indoor Championships | Lisbon, Portugal | 1st | 4 × 400 m relay | 3:30.00 |
| 2001 | World Championships | Edmonton, Canada | 2nd | 400 m hurdles | 54.27 |
| 2001 | World Championships | Edmonton, Canada | 3rd | 4 × 400 m relay | 3:24.92 |
| 2002 | European Indoor Championships | Vienna, Austria | 5th | 400 m | 52.91 |
| 2003 | World Indoor Championships | Birmingham, United Kingdom | 1st | 4 × 400 m relay | 3:28.45 |
| 2003 | World Championships | Paris, France | 3rd | 400 m hurdles | 53.71 |
| 2003 | World Championships | Paris, France | 2nd | 4 × 400 m relay | 3:22.91 |
| 2004 | Olympic Games | Athens, Greece | 8th | 400 m hurdles | 55.79 |
| 2005 | European Indoor Championships | Madrid, Spain | 1st | 4 × 400 m relay | 3:28.00 CR |
| 2005 | World Championships | Helsinki, Finland | 1st | 400 m hurdles | 52.90 |
| 2005 | World Championships | Helsinki, Finland | 1st | 4 × 400 m relay | 3:20.95 |
| 2005 | World Athletics Final | Monte Carlo, Monaco | 2nd | 400 m hurdles | 53.80 |
| 2007 | World Championships | Osaka, Japan | 2nd | 400 m hurdles | 53.50 |

== National titles ==
- Russian Athletics Championships
  - 400 m hurdles: 2003, 2004, 2005
- Russian Indoor Athletics Championships
  - 400 m: 2002

== Personal bests ==
- 400 metres - 53.22 s (2001)
- 400 metres hurdles - 52.34 s (2003)

== See also ==
- List of World Athletics Championships medalists (women)
- List of European Athletics Indoor Championships medalists (women)
- List of people from Krasnoyarsk
- Russia at the World Athletics Championships
- 4 × 400 metres relay at the World Championships in Athletics

Sporting positions
| Preceded by Nezha Bidouane | Women's 400 m hurdles season's best 2002–2003 | Succeeded by Faní Halkiá |
| Preceded by Faní Halkiá | Women's 400 m hurdles season's best 2005 | Succeeded by Lashinda Demus |
