= Hristina Hantzi-Neag =

Greek hurdler

Cristina Hantzi-Neag (born 26 December 1976) is a retired Greek hurdler who specialized in the 400 metres hurdles.

She finished eighth at the 2001 Mediterranean Games and at the 2006 IAAF World Cup. She also competed at the 2005 World Championships, the 2006 European Championships and the 2007 World Championships without reaching the final.

Her personal best time was 55.94 seconds, achieved in July 2007 in Sofia.
