= Kostki, Masovian Voivodeship =

Kostki
- Village
- Location within Poland
- Coordinates: 52°29′N 22°11′E
- Country: Poland
- Voivodeship: Masovian
- County: Sokołów
- Gmina: Sokołów Podlaski

Kostki [ˈkɔstki] is a village that is located in the administrative district of Gmina Sokołów Podlaski, within Sokołów County, Masovian Voivodeship, in east-central Poland.
