= Sandra Glover =

American track and field athlete

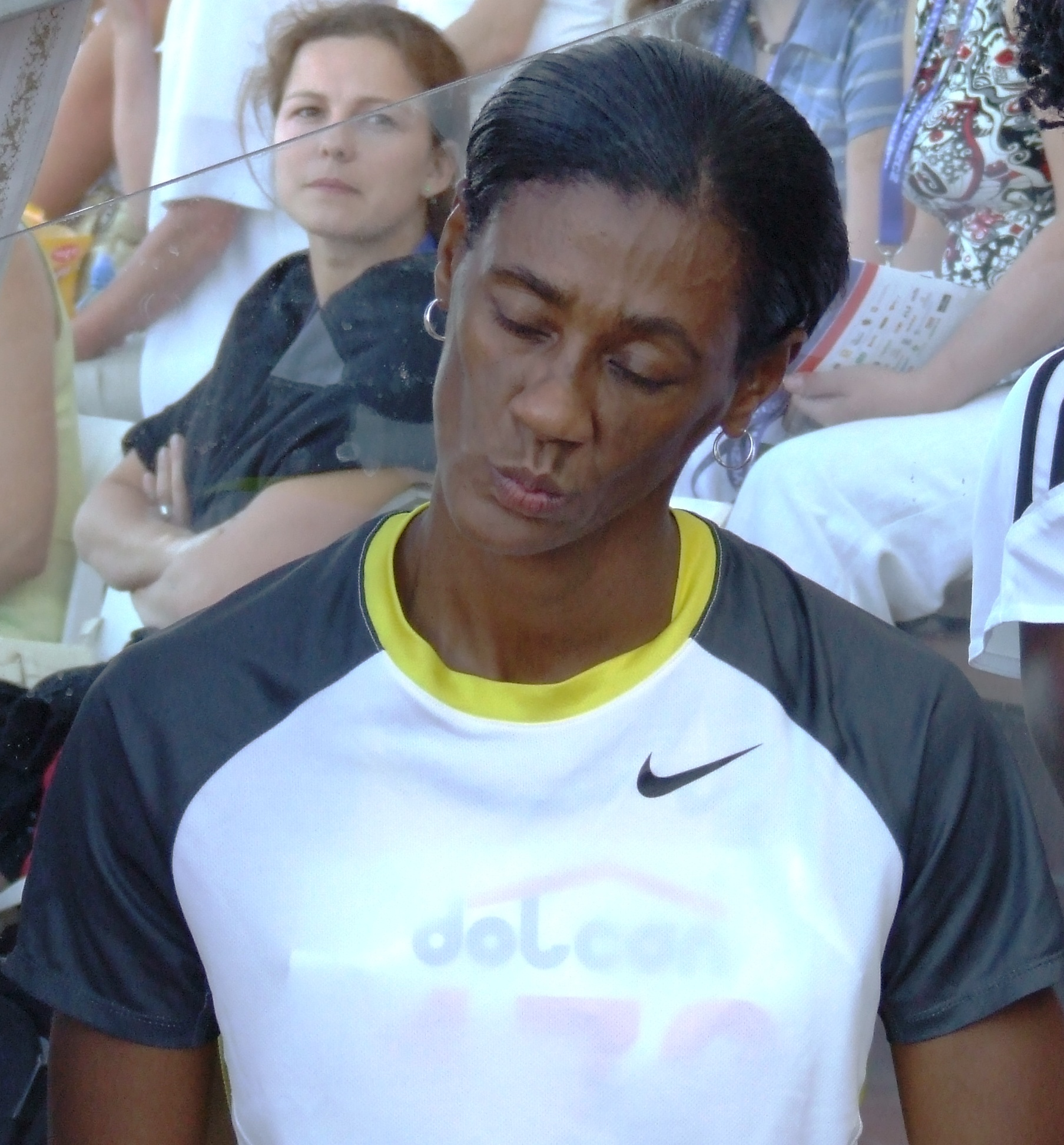
- Sandra Glover in 2007

Personal information
- Nationality: American
- Born: December 30, 1968 (age 57)
- Height: 5 ft 7.5 in (171 cm)
- Weight: 130 lb (59 kg)

Sport
- Country: United States
- Sport: Athletics
- Event: 400-meter hurdles
- College team: Houston Cougars
- Retired: 2007

Achievements and titles
- World finals: 1999–2005
- National finals: winner 1999–2002
- Personal best: 400 m hurdles: 53.32 (2005)
Medal record
World Championships
Silver medal – second place	2003 Paris	400 m hurdles
Bronze medal – third place	2005 Helsinki	400 m hurdles

Sandra Glover, née Cummings (December 30, 1968, in Palestine, Texas) is an American former track and field athlete who competed in the 400-meter hurdles. She was a medalist in that event at the World Championships in Athletics in 2003 (silver) and 2005 (bronze). She also represented her country at the 2000 Summer Olympics. She was the national champion at the USA Outdoor Track and Field Championships for four consecutive years from 1999 to 2002. She had five victories on the IAAF Golden League circuit during her career.

She holds the American masters record for the over-35 category, with her performance of 53.32 seconds at the 2005 World Championships in Athletics.

Glover attended the University of Houston and competed for the Houston Cougars track team. In July 2025, Glover began coaching the track and field program at Colby Community College.

== Achievements ==
- 2005 World Championships in Athletics: bronze medal
- 2003 World Championships in Athletics: silver medal
- 2001 World Championships in Athletics: fifth place
- 1999 World Championships in Athletics: fifth place
- 2nd IAAF World Athletics Final: first place
- 1st IAAF World Athletics Final: first place

== National titles ==
- USA Outdoor Track and Field Championships
  - 400 m hurdles: 1999, 2000, 2001, 2002

== Circuit wins ==
400 m hurdles

- IAAF Golden League
  - Meeting de Paris: 2003
  - Weltklasse Zürich: 2003, 2004
  - Bislett Games: 2005
  - ISTAF Berlin: 2005

== See also ==
- 400 metres hurdles at the World Championships in Athletics
- List of University of Houston people
- List of people with given name Sandra
