= Athletics at the 2004 Summer Olympics – Women's 400 metres hurdles =

Women's 400 metres hurdles at the Games of the XXVIII Olympiad
- Olympic Athletics
- Venue: Athens Olympic Stadium
- Date: 21–25 August
- Competitors: 34 from 25 nations
- Winning time: 52.82

Medalists
1st place, gold medalist(s)		Faní Halkiá	Greece
2nd place, silver medalist(s)		Ionela Târlea-Manolache	Romania
3rd place, bronze medalist(s)		Tetyana Tereshchuk-Antipova	Ukraine

The women's 400 metres hurdles at the 2004 Summer Olympics as part of the athletics program were held at the Athens Olympic Stadium from August 21 to 25.

The first round had split a full roster of runners into five heats with the first two gaining a direct qualification and then the next six fastest across all heats advancing to the semifinals. The top four runners in both of the semifinal heats moved on directly to the final.

The final was expected to witness four early-season favorites, U.S. top runner Sheena Johnson, 2003 world champion Jana Pittman, current world record holder Yuliya Pechenkina, and two-time European champion Ionela Târlea-Manolache, challenging each other for the Olympic title. Inside the stadium, however, the raucous Greek crowd turned their attention on home favorite Faní Halkiá, who had previously lowered the Olympic record by 0.05 of a second in the second semifinal. All three medalists came from that semi, fifth place equalling 3rd place in the first semi.

From the start in lane four, Halkia drew level with Pittman outside her at the halfway turn, until she quickly pulled away from the field on the last hundred metres and cleared the final hurdle. With none of the pre-race favorites willing to chase her on the home stretch, Halkia raced comfortably to an Olympic gold. Behind her, Târlea-Manolache and Ukraine's Tetyana Tereshchuk-Antipova came through on the inside to take the silver and bronze medals respectively. Running bravely against a tore knee injury, Pittman managed to finish the race in fifth place, while Pechenkina stumbled behind on a wretched run to round out the field in last.

Halkia's triumph proved to be a redemption for the host nation Greece in track and field, after the anti-doping scandal and suspicious affair on 2000 Olympic medalists and sprinters Kostas Kenteris and Ekaterini Thanou that tainted the start of the Games.

== Records ==
Prior to the competition, the existing World record, Olympic record, and world leading time were as follows:

World record	Yuliya Pechenkina (RUS)	52.34 s	Tula, Russia	8 August 2003
Olympic record	Deon Hemmings (JAM)	52.82 s	Atlanta, United States	31 July 1996
World Leading	Sheena Johnson-Tosta (USA)	52.95 s	Sacramento, United States	11 July 2004

The following records were established during the competition:

Date	Event	Name	Nationality	Result	Record
22 August	Semifinal 2	Faní Halkiá	Greece	52.77	OR

== Qualification ==
The qualification period for Athletics was 1 January 2003 to 9 August 2004. For the women's 400 metres hurdles, each National Olympic Committee was permitted to enter up to three athletes that had run the race in 55.60 seconds or faster during the qualification period. If an NOC had no athletes that qualified under that standard, one athlete that had run the race in 56.25 seconds or faster could be entered.

== Schedule ==
All times are Greece Standard Time (UTC+2)

Date	Time	Round
Saturday, 21 August 2004	09:05	Round 1
Sunday, 22 August 2004	21:20	Semifinals
Wednesday, 25 August 2004	21:55	Final

== Results ==
=== Round 1 ===
Qualification rule: The first two finishers in each heat (Q) plus the next six fastest overall runners (q) advanced to the semifinals.

==== Heat 1 ====
Rank	Lane	Name	Nationality	Result	Notes
1	2	Yuliya Pechenkina	Russia	53.57	Q, SB
2	7	Tetyana Tereshchuk-Antipova	Ukraine	54.63	Q
3	8	Ulrike Urbansky	Germany	55.15	q, SB
4	4	Monika Niederstätter	Italy	55.57	
5	6	Cora Olivero	Spain	56.19	
6	5	Patrina Allen	Jamaica	56.40	
7	3	Aïssata Soulama	Burkina Faso	57.60	PB

==== Heat 2 ====
Rank	Lane	Name	Nationality	Result	Notes
1	2	Jana Pittman	Australia	54.83	Q
2	3	Yekaterina Bikert	Russia	54.95	Q
3	5	Natalya Torshina-Alimzhanova	Kazakhstan	55.22	q, SB
4	4	Ieva Zunda	Latvia	56.21	
5	7	Benedetta Ceccarelli	Italy	56.28	
6	6	Surita Febbraio	South Africa	56.49	

==== Heat 3 ====
Rank	Lane	Name	Nationality	Result	Notes
1	5	Ionela Târlea-Manolache	Romania	54.41	Q
2	4	Brenda Taylor	United States	54.72	Q
3	2	Nezha Bidouane	Morocco	55.69	
4	8	Anna Jesień	Poland	56.03	
5	6	Shevon Stoddart	Jamaica	56.61	
6	3	Klodiana Shala	Albania	1:00.00	
	7	Stephanie Kampf	Germany	DNS	

==== Heat 4 ====
Rank	Lane	Name	Nationality	Result	Notes
1	5	Faní Halkiá	Greece	53.85	Q, NR
2	7	Lashinda Demus	United States	54.66	Q
3	2	Yekaterina Bakhvalova	Russia	55.16	q
4	8	Debbie-Ann Parris-Thymes	Jamaica	55.21	q, SB
5	4	Yvonne Harrison	Puerto Rico	55.84	
6	3	Mame Tacko Diouf	Senegal	57.25	
7	6	Salhate Djamalidine	Comoros	59.72	

==== Heat 5 ====
Rank	Lane	Name	Nationality	Result	Notes
1	4	Małgorzata Pskit	Poland	54.75	Q, PB
2	3	Sheena Johnson	United States	54.81	Q
3	8	Huang Xiaoxiao	China	54.81	q, PB
4	5	Androula Sialou	Cyprus	55.02	q
5	2	Daimí Pernía	Cuba	55.91	
6	6	Andrea Blackett	Barbados	56.49	
7	7	Galina Pedan	Kyrgyzstan	59.02	

=== Semifinals ===
Qualification rule: The first four finishers in each heat (Q) moved on to the final.

==== Semifinal 1 ====
Rank	Lane	Name	Nationality	Result	Notes
1	6	Yuliya Pechenkina	Russia	53.31	Q, SB
2	3	Jana Pittman	Australia	54.05	Q
3	1	Sheena Johnson	United States	54.32	Q
4	4	Brenda Taylor	United States	55.02	Q
5	8	Natalya Torshina-Alimzhanova	Kazakhstan	55.08	SB
6	5	Małgorzata Pskit	Poland	55.24	
7	7	Ulrike Urbansky	Germany	56.44	
8	2	Androula Sialou	Cyprus	1:05.72	

==== Semifinal 2 ====
Rank	Lane	Name	Nationality	Result	Notes
1	4	Faní Halkiá	Greece	52.77	Q, OR
2	3	Ionela Târlea-Manolache	Romania	53.32	Q, SB
3	6	Tetyana Tereshchuk-Antipova	Ukraine	53.37	Q, NR
4	8	Yekaterina Bikert	Russia	53.79	Q
5	5	Lashinda Demus	United States	54.32	
6	7	Yekaterina Bakhvalova	Russia	54.98	
7	2	Debbie-Ann Parris-Thymes	Jamaica	54.99	SB
8	1	Huang Xiaoxiao	China	55.53	

=== Final ===
Rank	Lane	Name	Nationality	Result	Notes
1st place, gold medalist(s)	4	Faní Halkiá	Greece	52.82	
2nd place, silver medalist(s)	3	Ionela Târlea-Manolache	Romania	53.38	
3rd place, bronze medalist(s)	1	Tetyana Tereshchuk-Antipova	Ukraine	53.44	
4	8	Sheena Johnson	United States	53.83	
5	5	Jana Pittman	Australia	53.92	
6	7	Yekaterina Bikert	Russia	54.18	
7	2	Brenda Taylor	United States	54.97	
8	6	Yuliya Pechenkina	Russia	55.79	
