= Ionela Târlea =

Romanian athlete

Personal information
- Born: 9 February 1976 (age 50) Horezu, Vâlcea
Medal record
Women's athletics
Representing Romania
Olympic Games
Silver medal – second place	2004 Athens	400 m hurdles
European Championships
Gold medal – first place	1998 Budapest	400 m hurdles
Gold medal – first place	2002 Munich	400 m hurdles
European Indoor Championships
Silver medal – second place	1998 Valencia	400 m
World Indoor Championships
Gold medal – first place	1999 Maebashi	200 m
Bronze medal – third place	2004 Budapest	4 × 400 m relay
Summer Universiade
Gold medal – first place	1999 Palma de Mallorca	400 m
Silver medal – second place	1995 Fukuoka	400 m hurdles

Ionela Târlea (during marriage Târlea-Manolache; born 9 February 1976) is a former track and field athlete, competing internationally for Romania. She won the silver medal in the 400 m hurdles at the 2004 Summer Olympics. At the same games in Athens, Greece, Târlea helped the Romanian national team to sixth place in the 4 × 400 m relay.

She gained recognition in top international competitions as early as 1996 at the Atlanta Olympics, when she came seventh in the 400 m hurdles event. In 1999 at the World Indoor Athletics Championships she won the gold medal in the 200 metres.

In 2000 in Sydney, Australia, Târlea earned her place again in the finals of the 400 m hurdles event, and came sixth. In 2002, she reaped gold at the European Championships held in Munich, also in the 400 m hurdles, her preferred event. A rather uneventful period followed for Târlea.:It was only in early 2008 that she secured her comeback among the world's top athletes as she came third in the 400 m event held in Stuttgart's Sparkassen Cup. She retired in April 2009, due to long-term injuries.

At club level Târlea competed for Dinamo Bucharest, Fenerbahçe Istanbul and Sporting Portugal athletics.

== Achievements ==
Year	Competition	Venue	Position	Event	Notes
Representing Romania
1992	World Junior Championships	Seoul, South Korea	3rd	400 m	52.13
1992	World Junior Championships	Seoul, South Korea	1st	4 × 400 m relay	3:31.57
1993	European Junior Championships	San Sebastián, Spain	1st	400 m hurdles	56.43
1994	World Junior Championships	Lisbon, Portugal	1st	400 m hurdles	56.25
1994	World Junior Championships	Lisbon, Portugal	2nd	4 × 400 m relay	3:36.59
1994	European Championships	Helsinki, Finland	17th (h)	400 m hurdles	57.79
1995	European Junior Championships	Nyíregyháza, Hungary	1st	400 m hurdles	56.04
1995	World University Games	Fukuoka, Japan	2nd	400 m hurdles	55.99
1996	Olympic Games	Atlanta, United States	7th	400 m hurdles	54.40
1997	World Indoor Championships	Paris, France	4th	400 m	52.06
1998	IAAF World Cup	Johannesburg, South Africa	4th	400 m hurdles	54.01
1998	European Championships	Budapest, Hungary	1st	400 m hurdles	53.37
1998	European Indoor Championships	Valencia, Spain	2nd	400 m	50.56
1999	World Indoor Championships	Maebashi, Japan	1st	200 m	22.39
1999	World University Games	Palma de Mallorca, Spain	1st	400 m	49.88
2000	Olympic Games	Sydney, Australia	6th	400 m hurdles	54.35
2001	World Championships	Edmonton, Canada	6th	400 m hurdles	55.36
2001	Grand Prix Final	Melbourne, Australia	6th	400 m hurdles	55.52
2002	European Championships	Munich, Germany	1st	400 m hurdles	54.95
2002	IAAF World Cup	Madrid, Spain	4th	400 m hurdles	56.17
2003	World Athletics Final	Monte Carlo, Monaco	3rd	400 m hurdles	54.44
2003	World Championships	Paris, France	4th	400 m hurdles	54.41
2004	Olympic Games	Athens, Greece	2nd	400 m hurdles	53.38
2004	World Indoor Championships	Budapest, Hungary	4th	400 m	51.58
2004	World Indoor Championships	Budapest, Hungary	3rd	4 × 400 m relay	3:30.06
2004	World Athletics Final	Monte Carlo, Monaco	5th	400 m hurdles	55.79
