= Joanna Hayes =

American hurdler (born 1976)

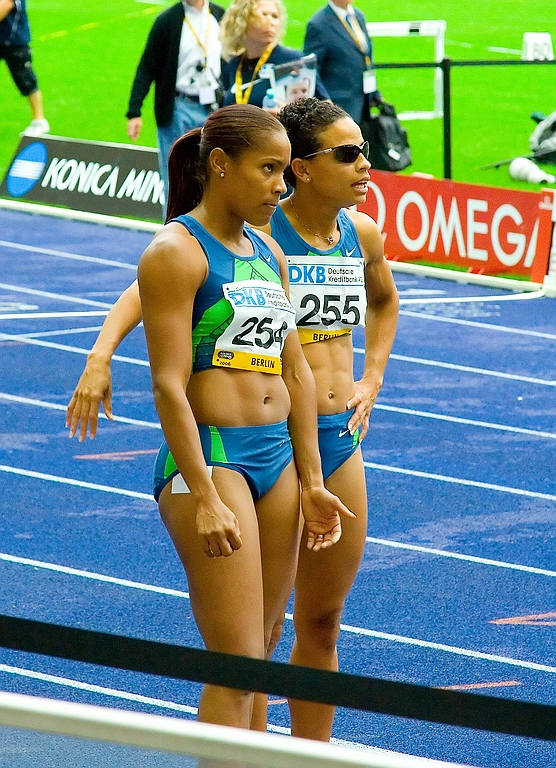
- Hayes on Right

Personal information
- Born: Joanna Dove Hayes; December 23, 1976 (age 49) Williamsport, Pennsylvania, U.S.

Sport
- Sport: Track & Field
Medal record
Women's athletics
Representing the United States
Olympic Games
Gold medal – first place	2004 Athens	100 m hurdles
Pan American Games
Gold medal – first place	2003 Santo Domingo	400 m hurdles
Summer Universiade
Silver medal – second place	1999 Palma de Mallorca	400 m hurdles
- Updated on July 7, 2012

Joanna Dove Hayes (born December 23, 1976) is an American hurdler, who won the gold medal in the 100 metres hurdles at the 2004 Summer Olympics.

She originally specialized in the 400 metres hurdles. She won the silver medal at the 1999 Summer Universiade in a career best time of 54.57 seconds, and the gold medal at the 2003 Pan American Games. She competed at the 1999 World Championships and 2003 World Championships without reaching the final.

From 2004 she competed internationally in the 100 metres hurdles. She finished fourth at the 2004 World Indoor Championships, and in August she won the Olympic gold medal in a career best time of 12.37 seconds. She also won the 2004 World Athletics Final toward the end of the season.

At the 2005 World Championships, she was among the favorites, having run 12.47 seconds in June. She did reach the final race, only to fail to finish after stumbling in the hurdles. She finished third at the 2005 World Athletics Final. After that, mediocre seasons followed with 12.76 (2006), 13.28 (2007) and 12.63 seconds (2008) as her season's best times. She failed to qualify for the 2008 Olympics due to injury.

While in high school at John W. North High School in Riverside, California she won both the 100 meter hurdles (setting the meet record) and 300 meter hurdles at the CIF California State Meet in 1995 and was named the national Girl's "High School Athlete of the Year" by Track and Field News. Receiving a track scholarship, she competed for UCLA.

While assistant coach at the University of Southern California, where she has coached from 2017 to the 2024 season, she was named athletic director for Track and Field and Cross Country. She was the former personal coach (2018–2020) to professional runner and 400 m hurdle world recorder holder Sydney McLaughlin. Previously, she was an assistant coach at UCLA from 2014 through 2016, and prior to that she coached track and field and cross country at Harvard-Westlake School in Los Angeles, California. She is the daughter of Los Angeles homeless advocate Ted Hayes. She gave birth to a daughter, Zoe, in December 2010. Hayes began her comeback to competition in 2012.

Hayes was inducted into the UCLA Athletics Hall of Fame on October 11, 2014

== Awards ==
- Night of Legends Award 2024: USATF Nike Coach of the Year

Achievements
Preceded by (United States) Gail Devers (Jamaica) Brigitte Foster-Hylton	Women's 100 m Hurdles Best Year Performance; 2004	Succeeded by (United States) Michelle Perry
