= Claudia Salvarani =

Italian middle-distance runner

Personal information
- Nationality: Italian
- Born: 8 March 1975 (age 51) Piacenza

Sport
- Country: Italy
- Sport: Athletics
- Event: 800 metres
- Club: G.S. Fiamme Oro
- Coached by: Luciano Gigliotti

Achievements and titles
- Personal best: 800 m: 2:01.23 (1999)

Claudia Salvarani (born 8 March 1975) is a former Italian female middle-distance runner.

== Biography ==
She won six national championships at senior level, 5 outdoor, and one indoor. Her personal best 2:01.23, set in Paris 1999, is the 11th best Italian performance of all-time. In 1999 her crono was also the 60th world best performance of the year in the IAAF season's lists.

== National titles ==
- Italian Athletics Championships
  - 800 metres: 1997, 1998, 2000, 2002, 2003
- Italian Athletics Indoor Championships
  - 800 metres: 1997
