= Sheena Tosta =

American hurdler (born 1982)

Personal information
- Full name: Sheena Johnson Tosta
- Born: Sheena Johnson; October 1, 1982 (age 44) Camden, New Jersey, U.S.
Medal record
Women's athletics
Representing the United States
Olympic Games
| Silver medal – second place | 2008 Beijing | 400 m hurdles |
Pan American Games
| Gold medal – first place | 2007 Rio de Janeiro | 400 m hurdles |

Sheena Tosta (née Johnson; born October 1, 1982) is an American track and field athlete who competed in the 400 metres hurdles. Her personal best time is 52.95 seconds, achieved in July 2004 in Sacramento. She won a silver medal in the Women's 400 meter hurdles at the 2008 Olympic Games.

Competing for the UCLA Bruins track and field team, Tosta won the 400 m hurdles at the 2003 NCAA Division I Outdoor Track and Field Championships and 2004 NCAA Division I Outdoor Track and Field Championships.

Sheena was inducted to the UCLA hall of fame in 2025.

She finished fourth at the 2004 Summer Olympics, won gold at the 2007 Pan American Games in Rio and. She represented her country at the World Championships in Athletics in 2007 and 2009.

Born in Camden, New Jersey, she graduated from Gar-Field Senior High School in Woodbridge, VA. She has a BS in cognitive science from UCLA and an MBA from the University of Illinois Champaign Urbana.
