= Monique Hennagan =

American sprinter (born 1976)

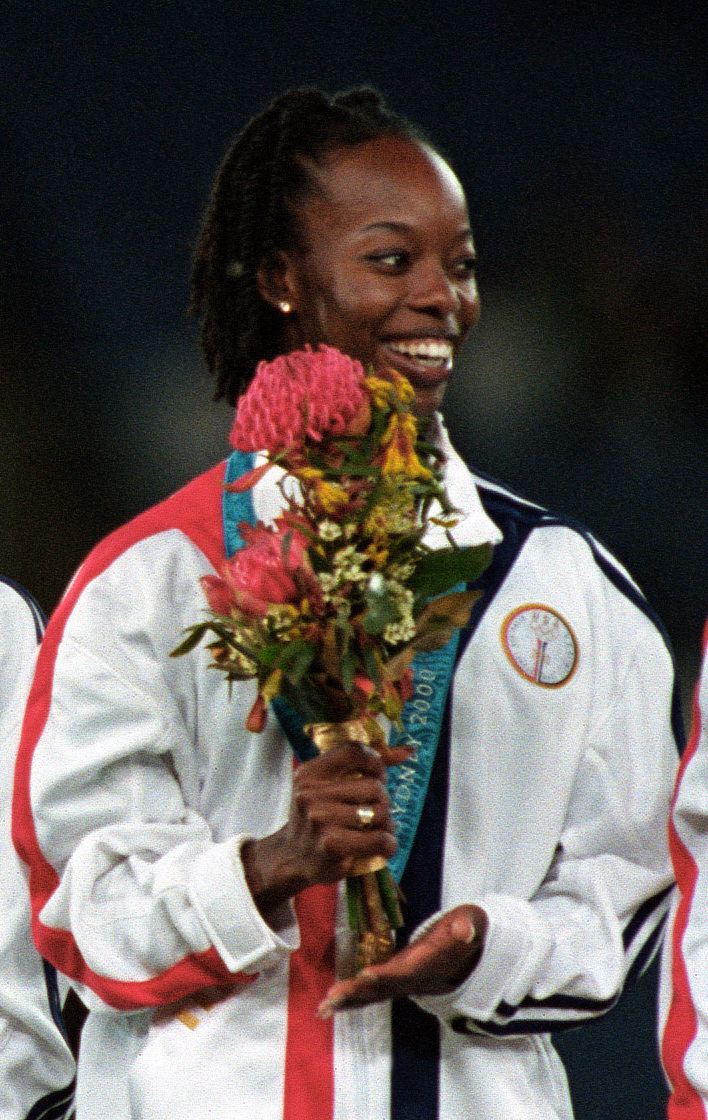

Personal information
- Born: May 26, 1976 (age 50) Columbia, South Carolina, U.S.
Medal record
Women's athletics
Representing the United States
Olympic Games
Gold medal – first place	2000 Sydney	4 × 400 metres relay
Gold medal – first place	2004 Athens	4 × 400 metres relay

Monique Hennagan (born May 26, 1976, in Columbia, South Carolina) is an American athlete who mainly competes in the 400 metres. She won her first relay medal at the 1999 World Indoor Championships and her second in 2003.

Monique Hennagan graduated from the University of North Carolina at Chapel Hill with a double major in Psychology and African American Studies. As a collegiate athlete, Hennagan was World Juniors gold 4 × 400 metre relay and silver 400 m medalist in 1994. At UNC, she was All-American in the 400 m and 4 × 400 metre relay. Additionally, 2 × NCAA Track and Field Champion both in the 400 m indoor and the 800 m outdoor in 1996. She was an 8 × ACC individual champion and won 400 m for four consecutive years.

As a post collegiate 1998–2009, Monique traveled the world competing as a professional track and field athlete. Hennagan was the silver medal recipient for women's 4 × 400 metre relay at the 1998 Goodwill Games. At the 2001 Goodwill Games, Monique Hennagan won gold for the women's 4 × 400 metre relay. In 2002 and 2003, Hennagan was a 2 × USA Indoor 400 m Champion. In 2000 and 2004, Hennagan won Sydney's and Athens' Olympics, respectively, for the women's 4 × 400 metre relay; also, 4th place Champion in 400 m at the 2004 Olympic Trials. Hennagan earned 2nd place finisher at IAAF World Athletics Finals 400 m. She received a gold medal for the women's 4 × 400 metre relay at the 2007 World Championship in Athletics. Monique Hennagan has been ranked "Top 8 in the World" three times, including 3rd place in the world, personal highest.

In 2014, Monique Hennagan was inducted in South Carolina's Athletic Hall of Fame. Today, Monique travels the United States working for Office and Professional Employees International Union as an advocate for workers' rights. She will also serve as Treasurer, for Divine Appointment Transformation House; a non-profit organization that Monique's mother, Mary Hennagan, is currently developing. Additionally, Monique Hennagan is an independent consultant with Paparazzi accessories, www.myfunmyclassy.com.

== Personal Bests ==
- 100 metres: 11.26 seconds (2005)
- 200 metres: 22.87 seconds (2005)
- 300 metres: 36.52 seconds (2001)
- 400 metres: 49.56 seconds (2004)
- 800 metres: 2:02.50 minutes (1996)
- 4 × 400 metres relay: 3:19.01 minutes (2004)

== Achievements ==
Year	Competition	Venue	Position	Event	Notes
Representing the United States
1992	World Junior Championships	Seoul, South Korea	10th (sf)	400 m	54.27
1992	World Junior Championships	Seoul, South Korea	4th	4 × 400 m relay	3:33.11
1994	World Junior Championships	Lisbon, Portugal	2nd	400 m	52.25
1994	World Junior Championships	Lisbon, Portugal	1st	4 × 400 m relay	3:32.08
1998	Goodwill Games	Uniondale, New York	2nd	4 × 400 m relay	3:24.81
1999	World Indoor Championships	Maebashi, Japan	3rd	4 × 400 m relay	3:27.59
2000	Summer Olympics	Sydney, Australia	1st	4 × 400 m relay	3:22.62
2001	Goodwill Games	Brisbane, Australia	1st	4 × 400 m relay	3:24.63
2003	World Indoor Championships	Birmingham, UK	3rd	4 × 400 m relay	3:31.69
2004	Summer Olympics	Athens, Greece	1st	4 × 400 m relay	3:19.01
2004	World Athletics Final	Monte Carlo, Monaco	2nd	400 metres	50.20
2007	World Championships	Osaka, Japan	1st	4 × 400 m relay	3:23.37

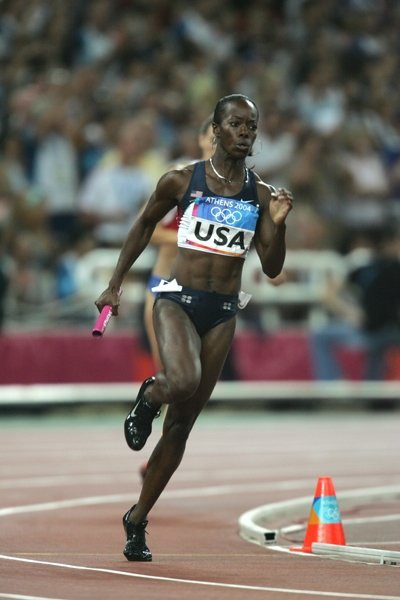
Monique Hennagan, 2004 Summer Olympics, Athens, Greece

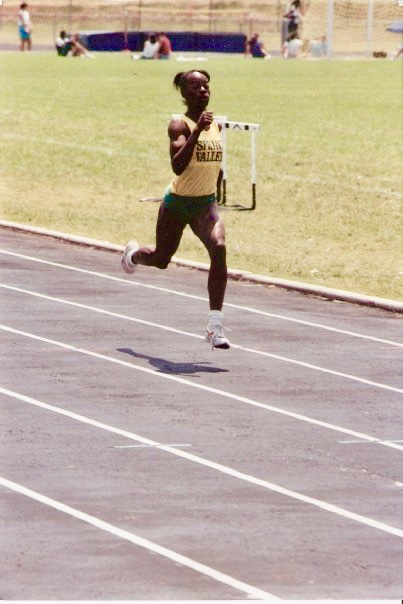
Monique Hennagan
