= Monika Niederstätter =

Italian athlete

Personal information
- Nationality: Italian
- Born: 2 March 1974 (age 52) Merano, Italy
- Height: 1.68 m (5 ft 6 in)
- Weight: 52 kg (115 lb)

Sport
- Country: Italy
- Sport: Athletics
- Events: 400 metres hurdles 400 metres
- Club: G.S. Forestale

Achievements and titles
- Personal bests: 400 m hs: 55.10 (1999); 400 m: 52.98 (2004)
Medal record
Mediterranean Games
| Silver medal – second place | 2001 Tunis | 400 m hs |
| Bronze medal – third place | 2005 Almería | 400 m hs |
European Cup
| Bronze medal – third place | 1999 Paris | 400 m hs |
| Bronze medal – third place | 2000 Gateshead | 400 m hs |

Monika Niederstätter (born 2 March 1974 in Merano, Italy) is a former 400 m hurdler (near the end of her career she switched to 400 metres), who won four medals at the International athletics competitions.

== Biography ==
Her best achievement is a fourth place at the 2002 European Athletics Championships. Her personal best time of 55.10s was set on 22 August 1999 at the World Championships in Seville, Spain.

== Achievements ==
| Year | Competition | Venue | Position | Event | Performance | Notes |
|---|---|---|---|---|---|---|
| 2002 | European Championships | (West Germany) Munich | 4th | 400 metres hurdles | 56.34 | |

== National titles ==
Monika Niederstätter has won 8 times consecutively the individual national championship.

- 6 wins in 400 metres hurdles (1998, 1999, 2000, 2001, 2002, 2003)
- 2 wins in 400 metres indoor (2004, 2005)

== See also ==
- Italian all-time top lists - 400 metres hurdles
