= Tasha Danvers =

British track and field athlete

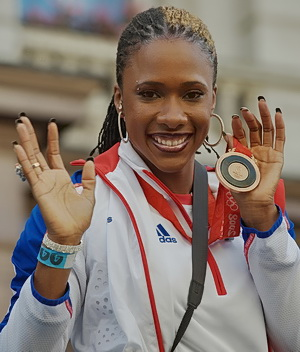

Personal information
- Nationality: British (English)
- Born: 19 September 1977 (age 49) Lambeth, London, England
- Height: 173 cm (5 ft 8 in)
- Weight: 64 kg (141 lb)

Sport
- Sport: Women's athletics
- Events: 100 metres hurdles; 400 metres hurdles; 4 × 400 metres relay; High jump
- Club: Shaftesbury Barnet Harriers; USC Trojans

Achievements and titles
- Olympic finals: 2000– 8th 2008 – 3rd
- World finals: 2007 World Championships – 8th
- Highest world ranking: 6 (2006/2007)
- Personal best: 400 m hurdles: 53.84 s
Medal record
Representing Great Britain
Olympic Games
Bronze medal – third place	2008 Beijing	400 m hurdles
Summer Universiade
Gold medal – first place	2001 Beijing	400 m hurdles
Silver medal – second place	2001 Beijing	4 x 400 m relay
Bronze medal – third place	1999 Palma de Mallorca	4 x 400 m relay
Representing England
Commonwealth Games
Silver medal – second place	2006 Melbourne	400 m hurdles
- Updated on 20 January 2007

Tasha De'Anka Danvers (born 19 September 1977) is a British Olympic bronze medallist, who finished in third place in the 400 metres hurdles at the 2008 Beijing Olympics. She was born in London to two athletes, Dorrett McKoy and Donald Danvers, who both moved to the United Kingdom from Jamaica as children.

== Athletics career ==
Danvers became the British 400 metres hurdles champion after winning the British AAA Championships title at the 1998 AAA Championships.

In 1999, she represented Great Britain at the 1999 World Championships in Athletics with a time of 56.66 seconds in the heats. This failed to see her qualify through the rounds; however it gave her vital experience, which she took on to the following year at the 2000 Sydney Olympics. At the age of 23, Danvers made the final of her first Olympic games, finishing in 8th place, after going out too hard. The following year, she won the 400 m hurdles at the 2001 Summer Universiade.

After regaining the AAA title at the 2002 AAA Championships she attended her first Commonwealth Games, in Manchester. She finished 7th in the final, behind the winner Jana Pittman of Australia. An athlete she would meet in the future, Melaine Walker of Jamaica, finished in 4th place. That same year, she also finished 7th in the 2002 European Athletics Championships.

In 2003, she married her Coach, Darrell Smith, the nephew of sprint coach John Smith. From 2004, she was styled as Tasha Danvers-Smith. Danvers reverted to her maiden name in 2008; the couple divorced the following year (2009).

Danvers-Smith missed her second Olympics, as she had taken time out for child-birth. This was criticised by many, including the British Olympic Medalist Alan Pascoe, who called her "stupid", as most people thought she would never make a return to competitive athletics. She returned in 2006 to take a silver medal in the Commonwealth Games, behind Pittman, as well as a seventh place in the final of the European Championships. At the end of this year, she reached a career high of 6th in the IAAF rankings.

While competing for the University of Southern California (USC), Danvers won several Pac-10 conference titles and competed in several events including the high jump and the 100 m hurdles. Tasha won the NCAA title in 2000 her second year as captain of the Women of Troy. She holds the USC school record in the 400 hurdles and on the 4 × 400 metres relay while also showing up in the top 10 in the 100 metres hurdles and high jump. After the Sydney Olympics, she returned to Los Angeles to finish her degree in Music Business and joined the famed training group HSI.

In February 2007, Danvers was inducted into the USC Hall of Fame.

Returning to the world scene in 2006, Danvers won her first global medal at the Melbourne Commonwealth Games, a silver and wo her third AAA title at the 2006 AAA Championships. She ended the summer as the sixth ranked hurdler in the world, setting the stage for her 2007 and 2008 seasons, and reclaiming her position as Britain's number one 400 m hurdler. In 2007 Danvers made her first World Championship final, in a near personal best, 54.08 s. She drew lane 2 in the final and took 8th, but finished the season with a strong run of races following Osaka, finishing the season ranked number 10 by Track and Field News. She remained the British number one for the 2nd consecutive year. Danvers-Smith also won a fourth and last British title at the 2007 British Athletics Championships.

In 2008, Danvers' athletics season started badly. She had achilles problems, and tore her hamstring on her first training session back from the Achilles tendon injury. At that year's British championships she recorded a disappointing time of 57.00 s, finishing in 2nd place far below her personal best. The race was won by the young athlete Perri Shakes Drayton. When the Olympic team was announced the following week, many criticised the selection of Danvers, as Shakes Drayton was an improving athlete, and Danvers, in many people's opinions, had reached her peak. However, Danvers attended the Olympics, winning her heat, and finishing 2nd in her semi-final, being the 4th fastest qualifier for the 400 m hurdles final. Danvers was in lane 7, one inside of ones of the favourites Tiffany Ross Williams. On entering the final straight, Danvers found herself in 3rd place. A part of the race that had been disastrous for her in the past, seemed to be in her favour, as she stormed down the straight closing down on the athlete ahead of her. She won a bronze medal in the final, with a personal best of 53.84s, behind Melaine Walker of Jamaica and Sheena Tosta of the United States.

Danvers missed the 2009 World Championships in Athletics due to injury.

In 2010, she was inducted into the London Youth Games Hall of Fame.

In June 2012, Danvers retired because of a series of injury problems.

== Other ==
Danvers is a keen artist and member of Art of the Olympians (AOTO). She started singing from an early age, and currently paints canvases. Her work is on sale at She is also a public speaker, coach and personal trainer, as well as becoming a prominent fitness model. As a youngster she competed for Croydon in the London Youth Games. She has also been on The BBC's A Question of Sport. In June 2015 Danvers appeared as a contestant on American TV show Bullseye. She reached the final stage, but failed to win when she rolled her buggy.

== Performance at Major Games ==
Championship	Event	Heat		Semi-final		Final	
Championship	Event	Result	Rank	Result	Rank	Result	Rank
1999 World Championships	400 m Hurdles	56.22 s	6	Did not advance			
2000 Olympics	400 m Hurdles	55.68		54.95		55.00	8
2000 Olympics	4 × 400 m Relay	3:25.28	1*			3:25.67	6
2001 World Championships	400 m Hurdles	56.36	4	Did not advance			
2001 World Championships	4 × 400 m Relay	3:25.25	2*			3:26.94	5
2002 European Championships	400 m Hurdles	56.55	4			56.93	7
2003 World Championships	400 m Hurdles	56.02	4	55.48	7	Did not advance	
2003 World Championships	4 × 400 m Relay	3:26.44	2*			3:26.67	6
2006 European Championships	400 m Hurdles	55.64	2	55.17	3	55.56	7
2007 World Championships	400 m Hurdles	55.67	3	54.08	2	54.94	8
2008 Olympics	400 m hurdles	55.19	1	54.31	2	53.84	Bronze medal

- Danvers only competed in the final, and did not run a leg in the heat.

=== Personal Bests ===
Best Marks
300 m, 37.80 (2000)
400 m, 52.89 (2008)
100 m hurdles, 12.96 (2003)
400 m hurdles, 53.84 (2008)
High jump, 1.82 m 1998)
