= Athletics at the 2001 Jeux de la Francophonie – Results =

These are the full results of the athletics competition at the 2001 Jeux de la Francophonie which took place on July 19–23, 2001, in Ottawa, Ontario, Canada.

== Men's results ==
=== 100 meters ===
Heats – July 20
Wind:
Heat 1: +0.3 m/s, Heat 2: 0.0 m/s, Heat 3: +0.5 m/s, Heat 4: +0.3 m/s, Heat 5: 0.0 m/s

Rank	Heat	Name	Nationality	Time	Notes
1	3	Oumar Loum	Senegal	10.27	Q
2	5	Serge Bengono	Cameroon	10.28	Q
3	2	Stéphan Buckland	Mauritius	10.29	Q
4	2	Jérôme Éyana	France	10.29	Q
5	4	Bruny Surin	Quebec	10.30	Q
6	5	Ibrahim Meité	Ivory Coast	10.31	Q
7	3	Antoine Boussombo	Gabon	10.36	Q
8	5	Nicolas Macrozonaris	Quebec	10.37	Q
9	4	Piotr Balcerzak	Poland	10.38	Q
10	5	Devon Davis	Canada	10.40	Q
11	1	Jérôme Éyana	France	10.44	Q
12	2	Glenroy Gilbert	Canada	10.45	Q
13	1	Hadhari Djaffar	Comoros	10.47	Q
13	4	Roger Anguono-Moké	Republic of the Congo	10.47	Q
15	2	Issa-Aimé Nthépé	France	10.52	Q
15	5	Bongelemba Bongelo	Wallonia-Brussels	10.52	Q
17	3	Patric Clerc	Switzerland	10.54	Q
18	1	Anthony Ferro	Wallonia-Brussels	10.55	Q
18	3	Ryszard Pilarczyk	Poland	10.55	Q
20	4	Alfred Moussambani	Cameroon	10.58	Q
21	1	Jean Jucky Randriamamtiana	Madagascar	10.59	Q
22	1	Claude Toukéné	Cameroon	10.61	Q
22	2	Idrissa Sanou	Burkina Faso	10.61	Q
24	4	Kenneth John	Dominica	10.65	Q
25	1	Tanko Abass	Quebec	10.68	
26	1	Yvan Darbouze	Haiti	10.70	
26	4	Vladimir Afriani	Haiti	10.70	
28	3	Abid Abdenbi	Morocco	10.72	
29	3	Jermaine Joseph	Canada	10.74	

Quarterfinals – July 20
Wind:
Heat 1: +0.2 m/s, Heat 2: +0.2 m/s, Heat 3: +0.6 m/s

Rank	Heat	Name	Nationality	Time	Notes
1	3	Bruny Surin	Quebec	10.17	Q
2	2	Stéphan Buckland	Mauritius	10.19	Q
3	2	Éric Pacôme N'Dri	Ivory Coast	10.23	Q
4	3	Oumar Loum	Senegal	10.26	Q
5	3	Ibrahim Meité	Ivory Coast	10.27	Q
6	1	Nicolas Macrozonaris	Quebec	10.30	Q
7	1	Antoine Boussombo	Gabon	10.33	Q
8	1	Jérôme Éyana	France	10.33	Q
9	1	Serge Bengono	Cameroon	10.33	Q
10	3	Glenroy Gilbert	Canada	10.39	Q
11	2	Devon Davis	Canada	10.40	Q
12	1	Patric Clerc	Switzerland	10.41	q
13	2	Piotr Balcerzak	Poland	10.45	Q
14	3	Issa-Aimé Nthépé	France	10.47	q
15	3	Ryszard Pilarczyk	Poland	10.48	q
16	1	Bongelemba Bongelo	Wallonia-Brussels	10.49	q
17	2	Roger Anguono-Moké	Republic of the Congo	10.50	
18	2	Anthony Ferro	Wallonia-Brussels	10.53	
19	1	Idrissa Sanou	Burkina Faso	10.54	
20	2	Hadhari Djaffar	Comoros	10.56	
21	3	Alfred Moussambani	Cameroon	10.57	
22	1	Jean Jucky Randriamamtiana	Madagascar	10.57	
23	3	Kenneth John	Dominica	10.66	
24	2	Claude Toukéné	Cameroon	10.85	

Semifinals – July 21
Wind:
Heat 1: -0.2 m/s, Heat 2: +0.9 m/s

Rank	Heat	Name	Nationality	Time	Notes
1	2	Stéphan Buckland	Mauritius	10.22	Q
2	1	Bruny Surin	Quebec	10.23	Q
3	1	Éric Pacôme N'Dri	Ivory Coast	10.36	Q
3	2	Nicolas Macrozonaris	Quebec	10.36	Q
5	1	Oumar Loum	Senegal	10.39	Q
5	2	Ibrahim Meité	Ivory Coast	10.39	Q
7	1	Glenroy Gilbert	Canada	10.43	Q
8	1	Jérôme Éyana	France	10.45	
9	2	Patric Clerc	Switzerland	10.48	Q
10	2	Devon Davis	Canada	10.49	
11	1	Piotr Balcerzak	Poland	10.50	
11	2	Ryszard Pilarczyk	Poland	10.50	
13	1	Serge Bengono	Cameroon	10.51	
13	2	Issa-Aimé Nthépé	France	10.51	
15	1	Bongelemba Bongelo	Wallonia-Brussels	10.60	
	2	Antoine Boussombo	Gabon	DQ	

Final – July 21
Wind: +0.7 m/s

Rank	Name	Nationality	Time	Notes
1st place, gold medalist(s)	Stéphan Buckland	Mauritius	10.13	
2nd place, silver medalist(s)	Bruny Surin	Quebec	10.18	
3rd place, bronze medalist(s)	Éric Pacôme N'Dri	Ivory Coast	10.24	
4	Nicolas Macrozonaris	Quebec	10.34	
5	Oumar Loum	Senegal	10.37	
6	Ibrahim Meité	Ivory Coast	10.38	
7	Glenroy Gilbert	Canada	10.41	
8	Patric Clerc	Switzerland	10.44	

=== 200 meters ===
Heats – July 22
Wind:
Heat 1: +2.3 m/s, Heat 2: +2.3 m/s, Heat 3: +2.4 m/s, Heat 4: +3.0 m/s, Heat 5: +0.9 m/s

Rank	Heat	Name	Nationality	Time	Notes
1	2	Stéphan Buckland	Mauritius	20.62	Q
2	4	Oumar Loum	Senegal	20.88	Q
3	4	Thierry Lubin	France	20.91	Q
4	5	Joseph Batangdon	Cameroon	20.92	Q
5	1	Marcin Urbaś	Poland	20.99	Q
6	2	Alex Menal	France	21.02	Q
7	4	Jermaine Joseph	Canada	21.15	q
8	3	Antoine Boussombo	Gabon	21.17	Q
9	4	Éric Pacôme N'Dri	Ivory Coast	21.27	q
10	3	Ahmed Douhou	Ivory Coast	21.30	Q
11	4	Eric Frempong	Canada	21.32	q
12	1	Anthony Ferro	Wallonia-Brussels	21.35	Q
13	5	Ommanandsing Kowlessur	Mauritius	21.38	Q
14	1	Nabil Jabir	Morocco	21.40	q
15	5	Ibrahim Meité	Ivory Coast	21.41	q
16	1	Gerald Clervil	Haiti	21.43	q
17	5	Patric Clerc	Switzerland	21.52	
18	4	Russell Brooks	Quebec	21.59	
19	1	O'Brian Gibbons	Canada	21.61	
20	1	Casimir Akoto	Togo	21.67	
21	4	Kenneth John	Dominica	21.73	
22	3	Jean-Francis Ngapout	Cameroon	21.75	
23	1	Jarek Kulesza	Quebec	21.76	
24	2	Elongo Ngoyi Konga	Republic of the Congo	21.89	
25	2	Pascal Dangbo	Benin	22.05	
26	5	Serge Angrand	Senegal	22.16	
27	5	Nathan Justin	Saint Lucia	22.18	
28	2	Nerijus Janutis	Lithuania	22.71	
29	5	Dan Phirum	Cambodia	23.15	

Semifinals – July 23
Wind:
Heat 1: +0.5 m/s, Heat 2: +2.1 m/s

Rank	Heat	Name	Nationality	Time	Notes
1	2	Oumar Loum	Senegal	20.62	Q
2	1	Stéphan Buckland	Mauritius	20.66	Q
3	2	Joseph Batangdon	Cameroon	20.84	Q
4	2	Thierry Lubin	France	21.01	Q
5	2	Antoine Boussombo	Gabon	21.02	Q
6	1	Marcin Urbaś	Poland	21.09	Q
7	1	Alex Menal	France	21.23	Q
8	1	Gerald Clervil	Haiti	21.39	Q
9	1	Ahmed Douhou	Ivory Coast	21.43	
10	1	Eric Frempong	Canada	21.52	
11	2	Nabil Jabir	Morocco	21.56	
12	1	Anthony Ferro	Wallonia-Brussels	21.58	
13	2	Ommanandsing Kowlessur	Mauritius	21.62	
	1	Éric Pacôme N'Dri	Ivory Coast	DNF	
	2	Ibrahim Meité	Ivory Coast	DNF	
	2	Jermaine Joseph	Canada	DNS	

Final – July 23
Wind: +0.5 m/s

Rank	Name	Nationality	Time	Notes
1st place, gold medalist(s)	Stéphan Buckland	Mauritius	20.33	
2nd place, silver medalist(s)	Oumar Loum	Senegal	20.59	
3rd place, bronze medalist(s)	Joseph Batangdon	Cameroon	20.75	
4	Thierry Lubin	France	20.94	
5	Alex Menal	France	21.00	
6	Antoine Boussombo	Gabon	21.22	
7	Marcin Urbaś	Poland	1:05.51	
	Gerald Clervil	Haiti	DNS	

=== 400 meters ===
Heats – July 19

Rank	Heat	Name	Nationality	Time	Notes
1	2	Eric Milazar	Mauritius	45.75	Q
2	3	Shane Niemi	Canada	45.76	Q
3	2	Benjamin Youla	Republic of the Congo	46.14	Q
4	2	Sofiene Labidi	Tunisia	46.25	q
5	3	Fernando Augustin	Mauritius	46.42	Q
6	1	Philippe Bouche	France	46.62	Q
7	2	Harland Moore	Canada	46.75	q
8	1	Ahmed Douhou	Ivory Coast	47.00	Q
9	2	Gerald Clervil	Haiti	47.03	
10	3	Bruno Wavelet	France	47.06	
11	1	Nabil Jabir	Morocco	47.11	
12	2	Abderrahim El Haouzy	Morocco	47.18	
13	3	Victor Boudpda Zock	Cameroon	47.25	
14	1	Narcisse Tévoédjré	Benin	47.35	
15	3	Jean-Marie Louis	Quebec	47.42	
16	2	Pierre-Gael Baron	France	47.63	
17	3	Abdellatif EL Ghazaoui	Morocco	47.87	
18	1	Yoube Ould H'meïde	Mauritania	48.52	
19	1	Nerijus Janutis	Lithuania	48.96	
20	2	Nathan Justin	Saint Lucia	50.32	
21	1	Florent Battistel	Monaco	50.48	
22	3	Oumarou Moussa	Niger	50.84	
23	1	Mohamed Keita	Guinea	51.33	

Final – July 21

Rank	Name	Nationality	Time	Notes
1st place, gold medalist(s)	Shane Niemi	Canada	44.86	GR
2nd place, silver medalist(s)	Eric Milazar	Mauritius	44.96	
3rd place, bronze medalist(s)	Sofiene Labidi	Tunisia	45.45	
4	Fernando Augustin	Mauritius	46.32	
5	Benjamin Youla	Republic of the Congo	46.44	
6	Philippe Bouche	France	46.48	
	Harland Moore	Canada	DNS	
	Ahmed Douhou	Ivory Coast	DNS	

=== 800 meters ===
Heats – July 19

Rank	Heat	Name	Nationality	Time	Notes
1	1	Mouhssin Chehibi	Morocco	1:46.86	Q
2	2	Jimmy Lomba	France	1:46.88	Q
3	2	Nathan Brannen	Canada	1:46.93	Q
4	2	Khouya Rachid	Morocco	1:46.99	Q
5	1	Ali Hakimi	Tunisia	1:47.07	Q
6	1	Khalid Tighazouine	Morocco	1:47.22	Q
7	1	Zach Whitmarsh	Canada	1:47.39	q
8	1	Franck Barré	France	1:47.58	q
9	1	Daryl Fillion	Canada	1:48.07	
10	2	Jean-Marc Destiné	Haiti	1:49.94	
11	1	William Best	New Brunswick	1:53.55	
12	2	Mindaugas Norbutas	Lithuania	2:01.08	

Final – July 21

Rank	Name	Nationality	Time	Notes
1st place, gold medalist(s)	Khalid Tighazouine	Morocco	1:46.53	GR
2nd place, silver medalist(s)	Mouhssin Chehibi	Morocco	1:46.63	
3rd place, bronze medalist(s)	Zach Whitmarsh	Canada	1:46.90	
4	Khouya Rachid	Morocco	1:47.23	
5	Nathan Brannen	Canada	1:47.25	
6	Jimmy Lomba	France	1:47.82	
7	Franck Barré	France	1:50.02	
	Ali Hakimi	Tunisia	DNF	

=== 1500 meters ===
Heats – July 22

Rank	Heat	Name	Nationality	Time	Notes
1	2	Paweł Czapiewski	Poland	3:43.80	Q
2	2	Abdelkader Hachlaf	Morocco	3:44.61	Q
3	1	Youssef Baba	Morocco	3:46.63	Q
4	1	Adil Kaouch	Morocco	3:46.69	Q
5	2	Kevin Sullivan	Canada	3:47.41	Q
6	1	Alexis Sharangabo	Rwanda	3:48.10	Q
7	1	Matthieu Vandiest	Wallonia-Brussels	3:48.43	Q
8	1	Aleš Tomič	Slovenia	3:49.84	q
9	2	Jean-Marie Ndikumana	Burundi	3:50.20	Q
10	1	Grzegorz Krzosek	Poland	3:50.88	q
11	2	Oscar Rutamucero	Burundi	3:51.29	q
12	2	Evaldas Martinka	Lithuania	3:52.26	q
13	1	Zepherinus Joseph	Saint Lucia	3:52.36	
14	1	Frederic Ndayiragije	Burundi	3:52.69	
15	2	Jeremy Deere	Canada	3:54.05	
16	1	Allan Klassen	Canada	3:55.44	
17	1	Sidi Mohamed Ould Bidjel	Mauritania	4:04.05	
18	2	José Luis Ebatela Nvó	Equatorial Guinea	4:06.21	

Final – July 23

Rank	Name	Nationality	Time	Notes
1st place, gold medalist(s)	Paweł Czapiewski	Poland	3:45.08	
2nd place, silver medalist(s)	Abdelkader Hachlaf	Morocco	3:45.41	
3rd place, bronze medalist(s)	Adil Kaouch	Morocco	3:45.64	
4	Kevin Sullivan	Canada	3:45.73	
5	Youssef Baba	Morocco	3:46.52	
6	Alexis Sharangabo	Rwanda	3:46.85	
7	Evaldas Martinka	Lithuania	3:49.41	
8	Matthieu Vandiest	Wallonia-Brussels	3:51.31	
9	Aleš Tomič	Slovenia	3:51.69	
10	Grzegorz Krzosek	Poland	3:52.40	
11	Jean-Marie Ndikumana	Burundi	3:53.23	
12	Oscar Rutamucero	Burundi	3:54.35	

=== 5000 meters ===
July 20

Rank	Name	Nationality	Time	Notes
1st place, gold medalist(s)	Mohammed Amyn	Morocco	13:37.14	
2nd place, silver medalist(s)	Abderrahim Goumri	Morocco	13:38.06	
3rd place, bronze medalist(s)	Mohamed Saïd El Wardi	Morocco	13:43.12	
4	Alfred Rugema	Burundi	13:43.65	
5	Loïc Letellier	France	13:45.22	
6	Alexis Sharangabo	Rwanda	13:57.79	
7	Jeremy Deere	Canada	14:14.06	
8	Sean Kaley	Canada	14:22.03	
9	Zepherinus Joseph	Saint Lucia	14:25.20	NR
10	Danny Tshindind Kassap	Democratic Republic of the Congo	15:05.53	

=== 10,000 meters ===
July 19

Rank	Name	Nationality	Time	Notes
1st place, gold medalist(s)	Ahmed Baday	Morocco	28:13.54	GR
2nd place, silver medalist(s)	Abdelhadi Habassa	Morocco	28:16.28	
3rd place, bronze medalist(s)	Aloÿs Nizigama	Burundi	28:37.17	
4	Christian Nemeth	Wallonia-Brussels	29:11.53	
5	Joseph Nsengiyumva	Rwanda	29:12.35	
6	Peter Cardle	Canada	29:20.91	
7	Issoueou Ousseini	Niger	30:21.26	
8	Banitie Lamboni	Togo	30:33.98	
	Mustapha Bamouh	Morocco	DNF	

=== Marathon ===
July 22

Rank	Name	Nationality	Time	Notes
1st place, gold medalist(s)	Mohamed EL Hattab	Morocco	2:18:16	
2nd place, silver medalist(s)	Mustafa Damaoui	Morocco	2:18:31	
3rd place, bronze medalist(s)	Jean-Pierre Monciaux	France	2:20:38	
4	Prosper Randriasoalaza	Madagascar	2:27:44	
5	Stephane Gamache	Canada	2:33:11	
6	Jason Warick	Canada	2:43:12	
7	Sophuong Vanh	Cambodia	3:47:36	
	Mohamed Erraoui	Morocco	DNF	
	Alphonse Munyeshyaka	Rwanda	DNF	

=== 110 meters hurdles ===
Heats – July 19
Wind:
Heat 1: -1.1 m/s, Heat 2: -1.0 m/s, Heat 3: -0.8 m/s

Rank	Heat	Name	Nationality	Time	Notes
1	3	Dudley Dorival	Haiti	13.52	Q
2	3	Joseph-Berlioz Randriamihaja	Madagascar	13.80	Q
3	2	Artur Kohutek	Poland	13.89	Q
4	1	Jean-Marc Grava	France	14.00	Q
5	2	Vincent Clarico	France	14.02	Q
6	2	Ivan Bitzi	Switzerland	14.09	q
7	3	Andrew Lissade	Quebec	14.14	q
8	1	Tomáš Dvořák	Czech Republic	14.14	Q
9	3	Jared MacLeod	Canada	14.15	
10	3	Philippe Lamine	France	14.16	
11	1	Mihai Marghescu	Romania	14.20	
12	2	Egbert Felix	Canada	14.21	
13	2	Roman Šebrle	Czech Republic	14.40	
14	2	Amine Dahou	Morocco	14.57	
15	1	Rock Yago	Burkina Faso	14.73	
16	3	Mohamed Samy Mohamed	Egypt	14.80	

Final – July 20
Wind:
-0.1 m/s

Rank	Name	Nationality	Time	Notes
1st place, gold medalist(s)	Dudley Dorival	Haiti	13.60	
2nd place, silver medalist(s)	Vincent Clarico	France	13.71	
3rd place, bronze medalist(s)	Artur Kohutek	Poland	13.73	
4	Joseph-Berlioz Randriamihaja	Madagascar	13.79	
5	Jean-Marc Grava	France	13.95	
6	Ivan Bitzi	Switzerland	14.05	
7	Tomáš Dvořák	Czech Republic	14.05	
8	Andrew Lissade	Quebec	14.06	

=== 400 meters hurdles ===
Heats – July 22

Rank	Heat	Name	Nationality	Time	Notes
1	1	Yvon Rakotoarimiandry	Madagascar	49.88	Q
2	1	Mustapha Sdad	Morocco	49.94	Q
3	2	Olivier Jean-Théodore	France	50.08	Q
4	1	Jean-Laurent Heusse	France	50.39	q
4	3	Naman Keïta	France	50.39	Q
6	1	Monte Raymond	Canada	50.42	q
7	3	Paweł Januszewski	Poland	51.02	Q
8	2	Marek Plawgo	Poland	51.35	Q
9	3	Adam Kunkel	Canada	51.36	
10	3	Sergej Šalamon	Slovenia	51.45	
11	2	Chakib EL Azouzi	Morocco	51.67	
12	2	Nick Stewart	Canada	51.69	
13	3	Ibrahima Maïga	Mali	52.32	
14	2	John Etienne	Quebec	53.44	
	1	Rova Rabemananjara	Quebec	DQ	

Final – July 23

Rank	Name	Nationality	Time	Notes
1st place, gold medalist(s)	Paweł Januszewski	Poland	49.24	
2nd place, silver medalist(s)	Yvon Rakotoarimiandry	Madagascar	49.53	
3rd place, bronze medalist(s)	Mustapha Sdad	Morocco	49.89	
4	Monte Raymond	Canada	49.91	
5	Olivier Jean-Théodore	France	50.33	
6	Marek Plawgo	Poland	50.67	
7	Jean-Laurent Heusse	France	50.69	
8	Naman Keïta	France	52.28	

=== 3000 meters steeplechase ===
July 19

Rank	Name	Nationality	Time	Notes
1st place, gold medalist(s)	Elarbi Khattabi	Morocco	8:16.63	GR
2nd place, silver medalist(s)	Lyes Ramoul	France	8:25.12	
3rd place, bronze medalist(s)	Zouhair El Ouardi	Morocco	8:28.72	
4	Joël Bourgeois	New Brunswick	8:28.72	
5	Hicham Grmoud	Morocco	8:42.97	
6	Vincent Le Dauphin	France	8:45.65	
7	David Milne	Canada	8:49.78	

=== 4 × 100 meters relay ===
Heats – July 22

Rank	Heat	Team	Competitors	Time	Notes
1	1	Ivory Coast		39.41	Q
2	1	Canada		39.50	Q
3	2	Mauritius		39.54	Q
4	1	France		39.66	Q
5	2	Benin		40.37	Q
6	2	Madagascar		40.78	Q
7	2	Togo		40.83	q
8	2	Gabon		41.52	q
	1	Haiti		DNF	
	1	Quebec		DQ	
	1	Wallonia-Brussels		DQ	
	2	Cameroon		DQ	
	2	Poland		DQ	

Final – July 23

Rank	Team	Competitors	Time	Notes
1st place, gold medalist(s)	Mauritius	?, ?, Ommana Kowlessur, Stéphan Buckland	39.04	
2nd place, silver medalist(s)	Ivory Coast	?, Ahmed Douhou, Éric Pacôme N'Dri, Ibrahim Meité	39.33	
3rd place, bronze medalist(s)	Benin		40.22	
4	France		40.27	
5	Madagascar		41.09	
6	Togo		41.16	
7	Gabon		41.16	
	Canada		DNF	

=== 4 × 400 meters relay ===
July 23

Rank	Team	Competitors	Time	Notes
1st place, gold medalist(s)	Poland	?, Piotr Długosielski, P iotr Haczek, Robert Maćkowiak	3:04.91	
2nd place, silver medalist(s)	France	Pierre Baron, Fred Mango, Philippe Bouche, Bruno Wavelet	3:06.27	
3rd place, bronze medalist(s)	Morocco		3:06.86	
4	Quebec		3:11.12	
	Canada		DNF	

=== 20 kilometers walk ===
July 22

Rank	Name	Nationality	Time	Notes
1st place, gold medalist(s)	Hatem Ghoula	Tunisia	1:22:56	
2nd place, silver medalist(s)	Denis Langlois	France	1:23:21	
3rd place, bronze medalist(s)	Gintaras Andriuškevicius	Lithuania	1:23:35	
4	Eddy Riva	France	1:25:31	
5	Silviu Casandra	Romania	1:26:14	
6	Daugvinas Zujus	Lithuania	1:26:30	
7	Franck Delree	France	1:26:56	
8	Tim Berrett	Canada	1:28:04	
9	Arturo Herta	Canada	1:29:09	
10	Patrick Boisclair	Quebec	1:29:21	
11	Benjamin Leroy	Wallonia	1:34:34	
12	Blair Miller	New Brunswick	1:35:57	
	Jean-Sébastien Beaucage	Quebec	DNF	
	Gordon Mosher	New Brunswick	DNF	
	Jocelyn Ruest	New Brunswick	DNF	
	Jiří Malysa	Czech Republic	DQ	

=== High jump ===
July 21

Rank	Name	Nationality	Result	Notes
1st place, gold medalist(s)	Mark Boswell	Canada	2.31	GR
2nd place, silver medalist(s)	Kwaku Boateng	Quebec	2.31	
3rd place, bronze medalist(s)	Jan Janků	Czech Republic	2.21	
4	Mustapha Raifak	France	2.21	
5	Martin Stauffer	Switzerland	2.21	
6	Frederic Schinz	Switzerland	2.15	
7	Khemraj Naiko	Mauritius	2.10	
8	Jeff Caton	Canada	2.10	
9	Eugene Ernesta	Seychelles	2.10	
10	Jean-Claude Rabbath	Lebanon	2.10	
	Charles Lefrançois	Quebec	NM	
	Jesse Litscomb	Canada	NM	

=== Pole vault ===
July 23

Rank	Name	Nationality	Result	Notes
1st place, gold medalist(s)	Adam Kolasa	Poland	5.60	
2nd place, silver medalist(s)	Štěpán Janáček	Czech Republic	5.55	
3rd place, bronze medalist(s)	Khalid Lachheb	France	5.40	
4	Adam Ptáček	Czech Republic	5.40	
5	Taoufik Lachheb	France	5.20	
6	Jamie Johnson	Canada	4.95	
7	Karim Sène	Senegal	4.95	
7	Marcus Popp	Canada	4.95	
9	Benoît Simonet	Wallonia-Brussels	4.80	
10	Boris Zengaffinen	Switzerland	4.80	
11	Simon Bélanger	Quebec	4.60	
12	Michel Genest-Lahaye	Quebec	4.60	
	Rob Pike	Canada	NM	

=== Long jump ===
Qualification – July 20

Rank	Name	Nationality	Result	Notes
1	Yahya Berrabah	Morocco	7.81	q
2	Frédéric Miyoupo	Cameroon	7.77w	q
3	Roman Šebrle	Czech Republic	7.71w	q
4	Arnaud Casquette	Mauritius	7.68w	q
5	Jonathan Chimier	Mauritius	7.65	q
6	Remi Robert	France	7.57w	q
7	Mickaël Loria	France	7.46	q
8	Ian Lowe	Quebec	7.44	q
9	Tomáš Dvořák	Czech Republic	7.44	q
10	Rich Duncan	Canada	7.43	q
11	Younès Moudrik	Morocco	7.25	q
12	Mike Laberge	Canada	7.21	q
13	Mehdi El Ghazouani	Morocco	7.12	
14	Fabien Honoré	Dominica	6.58	
15	Davy Mbita	Gabon	6.50	
16	Nagy Majdalany	Lebanon	6.48	

Final – July 22

Rank	Name	Nationality	Result	Notes
1st place, gold medalist(s)	Jonathan Chimier	Mauritius	7.89	
2nd place, silver medalist(s)	Arnaud Casquette	Mauritius	7.88w	
3rd place, bronze medalist(s)	Mickaël Loria	France	7.86	
4	Rich Duncan	Canada	7.83	
5	Yahya Berrabah	Morocco	7.81	
6	Frédéric Miyoupo	Cameroon	7.78w	
7	Mike Laberge	Canada	7.78w	
8	Remi Robert	France	7.42w	
9	Ian Lowe	Quebec	7.25	
	Tomáš Dvořák	Czech Republic	DNS	
	Younès Moudrik	Morocco	DNS	
	Roman Šebrle	Czech Republic	DNS	

=== Triple jump ===
July 23

Rank	Name	Nationality	Result	Notes
1st place, gold medalist(s)	Arius Filet	France	17.15	GR
2nd place, silver medalist(s)	Jérôme Romain	France	16.29	
3rd place, bronze medalist(s)	Djéké Mambo	Wallonia-Brussels	16.02	
4	Olivier Sanou	Burkina Faso	15.84	
5	Fabien Honoré	Dominica	14.69	
6	Nagy Majdalany	Lebanon	13.91	

=== Shot put ===
July 19

Rank	Name	Nationality	Result	Notes
1st place, gold medalist(s)	Brad Snyder	Canada	19.64	
2nd place, silver medalist(s)	Yves Niaré	France	18.94	
3rd place, bronze medalist(s)	Dylan Armstrong	Canada	17.57	
4	Thomas Quentel	France	17.47	
5	Gintas Degutis	Lithuania	17.22	
6	Rocky Vaitanacki	France	17.02	
7	Hicham Aït Aha	Morocco	16.91	
8	Apostolus Drogaris	Quebec	15.67	
9	John Pilling	Canada	14.53	

=== Discus throw ===
July 22

Rank	Name	Nationality	Result	Notes
1st place, gold medalist(s)	Jason Tunks	Canada	65.10	
2nd place, silver medalist(s)	Virgilijus Alekna	Lithuania	64.35	
3rd place, bronze medalist(s)	Ionel Oprea	Romania	63.64	
4	Jason Gervais	Canada	62.08	
5	Romas Ubartas	Lithuania	61.58	
6	Eric Forshaw	Canada	58.86	
7	Stéphane Nativel	France	56.36	
8	Mickaël Conjungo	Central African Republic	55.78	
9	Jean-Claude Retel	France	52.84	

=== Hammer throw ===
July 23

Rank	Name	Nationality	Result	Notes
1st place, gold medalist(s)	Szymon Ziółkowski	Poland	79.89	CR
2nd place, silver medalist(s)	Maciej Pałyszko	Poland	75.35	
3rd place, bronze medalist(s)	Raphaël Piolanti	France	72.71	
4	Samuele Dazio	Switzerland	71.27	
5	Cosmin Sorescu	Romania	70.00	
6	Yamine Hussein Abdel Moneim	Egypt	66.95	
7	Dylan Armstrong	Canada	64.91	
8	Saber Souid	Tunisia	62.52	
9	Charles de Ridder	Luxembourg	61.53	
10	Derek Woodske	Canada	59.86	
	Ian Maplethorpe	Canada	NM	

=== Javelin throw ===
July 20

Rank	Name	Nationality	Result	Notes
1st place, gold medalist(s)	Laurent Dorique	France	76.67	GR
2nd place, silver medalist(s)	Arûnas Jurkšas	Lithuania	73.66	
3rd place, bronze medalist(s)	Walid Abderrazak Mohamed	Egypt	72.64	
4	Mohamed Ali Ben Zina	Tunisia	71.90	
5	Graham Morfitt	Canada	70.68	
6	Trevor Snyder	Canada	68.24	
7	Antoine Colette	Luxembourg	66.02	
8	Larry Steinke	Canada	64.43	

=== Decathlon ===
July 19–20

The highest mark recorded in each event is highlighted in yellow

Rank	Athlete	Nationality	100m	LJ	SP	HJ	400m	110m H	DT	PV	JT	1500m	Points	Notes
1st place, gold medalist(s)	Pierre-Alexandre Vial	France	10.71	7.19	13.11	1.83	48.39	14.88	43.59	5.00	55.95	4:37.11	7890	
2nd place, silver medalist(s)	Hamdi Dhouibi	Tunisia	11.02	7.36	11.91	1.86	49.61	14.98	39.17	4.90	50.13	4:35.66	7548	
3rd place, bronze medalist(s)	Stéphane Bamboux	France	10.95	6.79	13.74	1.86	51.68	14.38	40.82	4.60	52.02	5:03.85	7320	
4	Jiří Ryba	Czech Republic	11.25	6.76	13.59	2.01	49.97	14.95	46.29	5.00	59.44		7183	
5	Lionel Marceny	France	10.96	7.66	12.51	1.92	50.28	14.40	41.03	NM	50.10		6790	
	Maba Ndiaye	Senegal	10.90	6.95	12.28	2.04	50.11	DQ	NM	4.00	DNS	–	DNF	
	Anis Riahi	Tunisia	11.06	7.12	11.13	DNS	–	–	–	–	–	–	DNF	

== Women's results ==
=== 100 meters ===
Heats – July 20
Wind:
Heat 1: +0.1 m/s, Heat 2: +0.3 m/s, Heat 3: +0.2 m/s, Heat 4: +0.1 m/s

Rank	Heat	Name	Nationality	Time	Notes
1	4	Venolyn Clarke	Canada	11.37	Q
2	4	Makaridja Sanganoko	Ivory Coast	11.40	Q
3	3	Hanitriniaina Rakotondrabe	Madagascar	11.46	Q
4	4	Sandra Citte	France	11.58	Q
5	2	Louise Ayétotché	Ivory Coast	11.65	Q
5	3	Marguerite Barcelo	France	11.65	Q
7	1	Erica Witter	Canada	11.68	Q
8	1	Viviane Sildillia	France	11.70	Q
9	2	Wafaa Taissir	Morocco	11.73	Q
10	2	Tamara Perry	Canada	11.74	Q
11	2	Kadiatou Camara	Mali	11.85	Q
12	1	Ony Paule Ratsimbazafy	Madagascar	11.90	Q
12	3	Awatef Hamrouni	Tunisia	11.90	Q
14	3	Amandine Allou Affoue	Ivory Coast	12.06	Q
15	4	Joanna Houareau	Seychelles	12.15	Q
16	2	Jenile Vite	Saint Lucia	12.18	Q
17	4	Ruth Babelawasolansi	Republic of the Congo	12.21	
18	1	Nidjad Inoussa	Benin	12.35	
19	3	Anais Oyembo	Gabon	12.36	
20	2	Sarah Tondé	Burkina Faso	12.51	
21	4	Rania Estephan	Lebanon	12.77	
22	1	Fatima Zahra Dkouk	Morocco	12.87	
23	1	M'Bemba Adama Sylla	Guinea	13.03	
24	4	Mari Paz Mosanga	Equatorial Guinea	13.13	
25	3	Fatou Dieng	Mauritania	13.29	
26	3	Ouk Chanthan	Cambodia	14.09	

Semifinals – July 21
Wind:
Heat 1: -0.1 m/s, Heat 2: +0.5 m/s

Rank	Heat	Name	Nationality	Time	Notes
1	2	Makaridja Sanganoko	Ivory Coast	11.30	Q
2	2	Venolyn Clarke	Canada	11.36	Q
3	1	Hanitriniaina Rakotondrabe	Madagascar	11.48	Q
4	2	Erica Witter	Canada	11.54	Q
5	1	Louise Ayétotché	Ivory Coast	11.59	Q
6	2	Sandra Citte	France	11.66	Q
7	1	Viviane Sildillia	France	11.70	Q
8	1	Tamara Perry	Canada	11.72	Q
9	2	Wafaa Taissir	Morocco	11.75	
10	1	Marguerite Barcelo	France	11.82	
11	2	Kadiatou Camara	Mali	11.87	
12	2	Ony Paule Ratsimbazafy	Madagascar	12.00	
13	1	Awatef Hamrouni	Tunisia	12.09	
14	1	Amandine Allou Affoue	Ivory Coast	12.09	
15	1	Joanna Houareau	Seychelles	12.30	
16	2	Jenile Vite	Saint Lucia	12.36	

Final – July 21
Wind: +0.5 m/s

Rank	Name	Nationality	Time	Notes
1st place, gold medalist(s)	Makaridja Sanganoko	Ivory Coast	11.27	
2nd place, silver medalist(s)	Venolyn Clarke	Canada	11.29	
3rd place, bronze medalist(s)	Hanitriniaina Rakotondrabe	Madagascar	11.40	
4	Louise Ayétotché	Ivory Coast	11.50	
5	Erica Witter	Canada	11.55	
6	Sandra Citte	France	11.56	
7	Viviane Sildillia	France	11.95	
8	Tamara Perry	Canada	37.36	

=== 200 meters ===
Heats – July 22
Wind:
Heat 1: +1.8 m/s, Heat 2: +2.9 m/s, Heat 3: +2.0 m/s

Rank	Heat	Name	Nationality	Time	Notes
1	2	Ionela Târlea	Romania	22.95	Q
2	1	Kaltouma Nadjina	Chad	22.97	Q
3	3	Aïda Diop	Senegal	23.14	Q
4	2	Makaridja Sanganoko	Ivory Coast	23.28	Q
5	2	Ladonna Antoine	Canada	23.44	q
6	1	Erica Witter	Canada	23.55	Q
7	3	Louise Ayétotché	Ivory Coast	23.56	Q
8	1	Delphine Combe	France	23.60	q
9	3	Danielle Kot	Canada	23.64	
10	3	Kadiatou Camara	Mali	24.05	
11	2	Aleksandra Pielużek	Poland	24.21	
12	1	Amandine Allou Affoue	Ivory Coast	24.82	
13	3	Ruth Babelawasolansi	Republic of the Congo	24.87	
14	1	Jenile Vite	Saint Lucia	25.20	
15	3	Nidjad Inoussa	Benin	26.14	

Final – July 23
Wind:
+0.5 m/s

Rank	Name	Nationality	Time	Notes
1st place, gold medalist(s)	Kaltouma Nadjina	Chad	23.07	
2nd place, silver medalist(s)	Ionela Târlea	Romania	23.11	
3rd place, bronze medalist(s)	Aïda Diop	Senegal	23.20	
4	Makaridja Sanganoko	Ivory Coast	23.41	
5	Erica Witter	Canada	23.49	
6	Delphine Combe	France	23.57	
7	Louise Ayétotché	Ivory Coast	23.60	
8	Ladonna Antoine	Canada	23.63	

=== 400 meters ===
Heats – July 20

Rank	Heat	Name	Nationality	Time	Notes
1	2	Mireille Nguimgo	Cameroon	51.24	Q, GR
2	2	Kaltouma Nadjina	Chad	51.35	Q
3	1	Otilia Ruicu	Romania	51.88	Q
4	2	Zana Minika	Lithuania	52.25	q
5	3	Amy Mbacké Thiam	Senegal	52.40	Q
6	1	Foy Williams	Canada	52.50	Q
7	2	Grażyna Prokopek	Poland	52.65	q
8	1	Marie-Louise Bévis	France	52.66	
9	3	Anita Mormand	France	52.77	Q
10	3	Samantha George	Canada	52.82	
11	1	Aneta Lemiesz	Poland	52.95	
12	3	Awatef Ben Hassine	Tunisia	52.97	
13	2	Danielle Kot	Canada	53.13	
14	1	Hortense Béwouda	Cameroon	53.71	
15	3	Nafissa Antoine	Niger	1:08.75	

Final – July 21

Rank	Name	Nationality	Time	Notes
1st place, gold medalist(s)	Amy Mbacké Thiam	Senegal	50.92	GR
2nd place, silver medalist(s)	Kaltouma Nadjina	Chad	51.03	
3rd place, bronze medalist(s)	Mireille Nguimgo	Cameroon	51.47	
4	Otilia Ruicu	Romania	51.68	
5	Foy Williams	Canada	52.40	
6	Grażyna Prokopek	Poland	52.45	
7	Anita Mormand	France	52.80	
8	Zana Minina	Lithuania	52.91	

=== 800 meters ===
Heats – July 19

Rank	Heat	Name	Nationality	Time	Notes
1	3	Irina Krakoviak	Lithuania	2:04.15	Q, GR
2	1	Seltana Aït Hammou	Morocco	2:04.39	Q
3	3	Peggy Babin	France	2:04.64	Q
4	1	Abir Nakli	Tunisia	2:04.69	Q
5	2	Amina Aït Hammou	Morocco	2:04.88	Q
6	2	Diane Cummins	Canada	2:05.28	Q
7	1	Virginie Fouquet	France	2:05.28	q
8	2	Fatma Lanouar	Tunisia	2:05.39	q
9	3	Stéphanie Zanga	Cameroon	2:05.84	
10	2	Fanja Rakotomalala	Madagascar	2:07.57	
11	3	Maureen Stapleton-Hay	Canada	2:08.05	
12	1	Tanya Wright	Canada	2:08.85	
13	1	Melissa Chenard	Quebec	2:12.14	
14	2	Amy Cassie	New Brunswick	2:16.34	
15	2	Mirvatte Hamze	Lebanon	2:16.68	
16	3	Claudine Kamariza	Burundi	2:17.46	
	2	Lamberthe Nyabamikazi	Burundi	DQ	

Final – July 21

Rank	Name	Nationality	Time	Notes
1st place, gold medalist(s)	Diane Cummins	Canada	2:00.77	GR
2nd place, silver medalist(s)	Irina Krakoviak	Lithuania	2:01.27	
3rd place, bronze medalist(s)	Peggy Babin	France	2:01.66	
4	Amina Aït Hammou	Morocco	2:01.75	
5	Seltana Aït Hammou	Morocco	2:02.32	
6	Abir Nakli	Tunisia	2:03.50	
7	Virginie Fouquet	France	2:06.57	
	Fatma Lanouar	Tunisia	DNF	

=== 1500 meters ===
Heats – July 22

Rank	Heat	Name	Nationality	Time	Notes
1	2	Leah Pells	Canada	4:19.24	Q
2	2	Seloua Ouaziz	Morocco	4:19.28	Q
3	2	Fatima Baouf	Wallonia	4:19.28	Q
4	2	Elena Iagăr	Romania	4:21.50	Q
5	2	Hanane Ouhaddou	Morocco	4:21.56	q
6	2	Abir Nakli	Tunisia	4:21.72	q
7	2	Vicky Lynch-Pounds	Canada	4:22.53	q
8	1	Lidia Chojecka	Poland	4:28.27	Q
9	1	Fatma Lanouar	Tunisia	4:28.94	Q
10	1	Cristina Grosu	Romania	4:29.35	Q
11	1	Robyn Meagher	Canada	4:29.76	Q
12	1	Nessa Paul	Saint Lucia	4:56.95	q
13	1	Mirvatte Hamze	Lebanon	4:57.61	
14	1	Sirivanh Ketavong	Laos	5:00.97	
15	2	Mercedes Asue Alo	Equatorial Guinea	5:47.86	
	2	Lamberthe Nyabamikazi	Burundi	DNF	q

Final – July 23

Rank	Name	Nationality	Time	Notes
1st place, gold medalist(s)	Elena Iagăr	Romania	4:17.03	
2nd place, silver medalist(s)	Fatma Lanouar	Tunisia	4:17.95	
3rd place, bronze medalist(s)	Lidia Chojecka	Poland	4:18.16	
4	Leah Pells	Canada	4:18.75	
5	Seloua Ouaziz	Morocco	4:19.34	
6	Robyn Meagher	Canada	4:19.52	
7	Vicky Lynch-Pounds	Canada	4:20.12	
8	Fatima Baouf	Wallonia	4:20.18	
9	Cristina Grosu	Romania	4:20.61	
10	Abir Nakli	Tunisia	4:20.67	
11	Hanane Ouhaddou	Morocco	4:29.75	
12	Lamberthe Nyabamikazi	Burundi	4:38.06	
13	Nessa Paul	Saint Lucia	5:00.25	

=== 5000 meters ===
July 23

Rank	Name	Nationality	Time	Notes
1st place, gold medalist(s)	Tina Connelly	Canada	16:05.59	CR
2nd place, silver medalist(s)	Zhor El Kamch	Morocco	16:15.56	
3rd place, bronze medalist(s)	Inga Juodeškienė	Lithuania	16:19.34	
4	Courtney Babcock	Canada	16:26.99	
5	Sarah Dupré	Canada	16:48.73	
6	Isabelle Ledroit	Quebec	16:52.12	
7	Nessa Paul	Saint Lucia	19:14.27	
8	Alima Adamou	Niger	21:13.50	
9	Mok Aranya	Cambodia	22:17.10	
	Malika Asahssah	Morocco	DNF	

=== 10,000 meters ===
July 20

Rank	Name	Nationality	Time	Notes
1st place, gold medalist(s)	Zhor El Kamch	Morocco	34:07.52	
2nd place, silver medalist(s)	Lisa Harvey	Canada	34:23.70	
3rd place, bronze medalist(s)	Diane Nukuri	Burundi	34:30.66	
4	Épiphanie Nyirabaramé	Rwanda	35:12.65	
5	Daphrose Ndayikunda	Burundi	35:16.16	

=== Marathon ===
July 22

Rank	Name	Nationality	Time	Notes
1st place, gold medalist(s)	Michele Leservoisier	France	2:44:00	CR
2nd place, silver medalist(s)	Clarisse Rasoarizay	Madagascar	2:46:29	
3rd place, bronze medalist(s)	Leslie Carson	Canada	2:50:02	
4	Elizabeth Ruel	Quebec	2:56:59	
5	Elaine Coburn	Canada	3:02:52	
6	Janice McCaffrey	Canada	3:03:26	
7	Zalifa Ali	Comoros	3:56:54	
	Josiane Abouzone	Gabon	DNF	

=== 100 meters hurdles ===
Heats – July 19
Wind:
Heat 1: -1.6 m/s, Heat 2: -0.2 m/s

Rank	Heat	Name	Nationality	Time	Notes
1	1	Nadine Faustin	Haiti	13.11	Q
2	1	Perdita Felicien	Canada	13.13	Q
3	2	Mame Tacko Diouf	Senegal	13.22	Q
4	1	Patricia Buval	France	13.25	Q
4	2	Angela Whyte	Canada	13.25	Q
6	2	Rosa Rakotozafy	Madagascar	13.28	Q
7	2	Haydy Aron	France	13.39	q
8	1	Sonia Paquette	Quebec	13.43	q
9	2	Lesley Tashlin	Canada	13.51	
10	2	Cécile Michot	France	13.87	
11	1	Maria-Joëlle Conjungo	Central African Republic	13.90	
12	1	Myriam Tschomba	Wallonia-Brussels	13.95	
13	1	Katka Božič	Slovenia	14.15	
14	2	Catherine Johnson	Ivory Coast	14.33	
15	2	Diana Radavičienė	Lithuania	14.68	

Final – July 20
Wind:
-0.5 m/s

Rank	Name	Nationality	Time	Notes
1st place, gold medalist(s)	Perdita Felicien	Canada	12.92	=GR
2nd place, silver medalist(s)	Patricia Buval	France	13.02	
3rd place, bronze medalist(s)	Nadine Faustin	Haiti	13.05	
4	Angela Whyte	Canada	13.09	
5	Rosa Rakotozafy	Madagascar	13.10	
6	Sonia Paquette	Quebec	13.28	
7	Haydy Aron	France	13.35	
8	Mame Tacko Diouf	Senegal	21.62	

=== 400 meters hurdles ===
Heats – July 22

Rank	Heat	Name	Nationality	Time	Notes
1	1	Nezha Bidouane	Morocco	54.85	Q, GR
2	2	Karlene Haughton	Canada	56.24	Q
3	1	Małgorzata Pskit	Poland	56.82	Q
4	2	Mame Tacko Diouf	Senegal	57.13	Q
5	2	Anna Olichwierczuk	Poland	57.53	Q
6	2	Viviane Dorsile	France	57.60	q
7	1	Corinne Tafflet	France	57.86	Q
8	1	Tawa Babatunde	Canada	58.47	q
9	1	Isabelle Gervais	Canada	58.48	
10	2	Carole Kaboud Mebam	Cameroon	1:01.11	
11	2	Diana Radavičienė	Lithuania	1:04.80	
	1	Cendrino Razaiarimalala	Madagascar	DQ	
	1	Gnima Touré	Senegal	DNF	

Final – July 23

Rank	Name	Nationality	Time	Notes
1st place, gold medalist(s)	Nezha Bidouane	Morocco	54.91	
2nd place, silver medalist(s)	Karlene Haughton	Canada	56.19	
3rd place, bronze medalist(s)	Małgorzata Pskit	Poland	56.25	
4	Anna Olichwierczuk	Poland	56.56	
5	Mame Tacko Diouf	Senegal	56.95	
6	Tawa Babatunde	Canada	58.74	
7	Viviane Dorsile	France	59.02	
	Corinne Tafflet	France	DNF	

=== 4 × 100 meters relay ===
July 23

Rank	Team	Competitors	Time	Notes
1st place, gold medalist(s)	Canada	Esi Benkyarku, Erika Witter, Venolyn Clarke, Martha Adusei	43.73	
2nd place, silver medalist(s)	Ivory Coast	Marie Gnahoré, Amandine Allou Affoue, Makaridja Sanganoko, Louise Ayétotché	43.89	
3rd place, bronze medalist(s)	Madagascar	Monica Rahanitraniriana, Paule Ony Ratsimbazafy, Hanitriniaina Rakotondrabé, Lalanirina Rosa Rakotozafy	44.12	
4	France		44.51	

=== 4 × 400 meters relay ===
July 23

Rank	Team	Competitors	Time	Notes
1st place, gold medalist(s)	Poland	Aleksandra Pielużek, Aneta Lemiesz, Grażyna Prokopek, Małgorzata Pskit	3:28.97	GR
2nd place, silver medalist(s)	France	Anita Mormand, Peggy Babin, Viviane Dorsile, Marie-Louise Bévis	3:30.04	
3rd place, bronze medalist(s)	Canada	Foy Williams, Lamik Oyewumi, Lindsay Lockhead, Samantha George	3:31.08	
4	Cameroon		3:33.53	
5	Quebec		3:49.10	

=== 10 kilometers walk ===
July 21

Rank	Name	Nationality	Time	Notes
1st place, gold medalist(s)	Norica Câmpean	Romania	44:32	CR
2nd place, silver medalist(s)	Sonata Milušauskaitė	Lithuania	46:10	
3rd place, bronze medalist(s)	Tatiana Boulanger	France	47:11	
4	Nagwa Ibrahim Ali	Egypt	47:27	
5	Kim Cathro	Canada	48:26	
6	Marina Crivello	Quebec	49:19	
7	Holly Gerke	Canada	50:00	
8	Karen Foan	Canada	52:16	

=== High jump ===
July 23

Rank	Name	Nationality	Result	Notes
1st place, gold medalist(s)	Wanita Dykstra-May	Canada	1.91	CR
2nd place, silver medalist(s)	Nicole Forrester	Canada	1.89	
3rd place, bronze medalist(s)	Oana Pantelimon	Romania	1.84	
4	Nathalie Belfort	Quebec	1.81	
5	Whitney Evans	Canada	1.81	
6	Hind Bounowail	Morocco	1.70	

=== Pole vault ===
July 20

Rank	Name	Nationality	Result	Notes
1st place, gold medalist(s)	Monika Pyrek	Poland	4.30	CR
2nd place, silver medalist(s)	Pavla Hamáčková	Czech Republic	4.20	
3rd place, bronze medalist(s)	Julie Vigourt	France	4.10	
4	Céline Poissonnier	France	4.10	
5	Dana Ellis	Canada	4.00	
6	Ardin Harrison	Canada	4.00	
7	Caroline Goetghebuer	Wallonia-Brussels	4.00	
8	Stephanie McCann	Canada	3.90	
9	Irena Dufour	Wallonia-Brussels	3.75	
9	Syrine Balti	Tunisia	3.75	
11	Elyse Ménard	Quebec	3.75	

=== Long jump ===
July 21

Rank	Name	Nationality	Result	Notes
1st place, gold medalist(s)	Alice Falaiye	Canada	6.38	
2nd place, silver medalist(s)	Françoise Mbango Etone	Cameroon	6.37	
3rd place, bronze medalist(s)	Krysha Bayley	Canada	6.27	
4	Nicole Devonish-Gilmor	Canada	6.25	
5	Viviane Sildilla	France	5.92	
6	Yah Koïta	Mali	5.83	
7	Beryl Laramé	Seychelles	5.82	
8	Adrija Grocienė	Lithuania	5.69	
9	Joanna Houareau	Seychelles	5.59	
10	Stephany Reid	New Brunswick	5.49	
11	Brianie Massaka-Youlou	Democratic Republic of the Congo	5.45	
12	Rania Estephan	Lebanon	5.14	

=== Triple jump ===
July 21

Rank	Name	Nationality	Result	Notes
1st place, gold medalist(s)	Cristina Nicolau	Romania	14.62	GR
2nd place, silver medalist(s)	Françoise Mbango Etone	Cameroon	14.56	
3rd place, bronze medalist(s)	Adelina Gavrilă	Romania	13.91w	
4	Michelle Hastick	Canada	13.82w	
5	Althea Williams	Canada	13.60w	
6	Chantal Ruth Ouola	Burkina Faso	13.10w	
7	Virginija Petkevicienė	Lithuania	13.06	
8	Adrija Grocienė	Lithuania	12.60w	
9	Stephany Reid	New Brunswick	12.58w	
10	Brianie Massaka-Youlou	Republic of the Congo	12.16w	

=== Shot put ===
July 21

Rank	Name	Nationality	Result	Notes
1st place, gold medalist(s)	Krystyna Danilczyk-Zabawska	Poland	18.25	CR
2nd place, silver medalist(s)	Elena Hila	Romania	17.07	
3rd place, bronze medalist(s)	Laurence Manfredi	France	16.82	
4	Georgette Reed	Canada	16.00	
5	Amel Ben Khaled	Tunisia	15.21	
6	Caroline Larose	Quebec	14.60	
7	Nicole Haynes	Canada	14.44	
8	Ange Doris Ratsimbazafy	Madagascar	13.89	
9	Dominique Bilodeau	Quebec	13.49	
10	Tina McDonald	Canada	13.44	
11	Brigitte Traoré	Burkina Faso	12.89	
12	Isabelle Charles	Dominica	12.64	
13	Nadège Nakombo	Central African Republic	12.11	

=== Discus throw ===
July 21

Rank	Name	Nationality	Result	Notes
1st place, gold medalist(s)	Nicoleta Grasu	Romania	64.53	GR
2nd place, silver medalist(s)	Joanna Wiśniewska	Poland	56.94	
3rd place, bronze medalist(s)	Mélina Robert-Michon	France	56.81	
4	Monia Kari	Tunisia	51.71	
5	Tina McDonald	Canada	50.41	
6	Georgette Reed	Canada	50.15	
7	Nicole Chimko	Canada	49.64	
8	Kazai Suzanne Kragbé	Ivory Coast	45.70	
9	Julie Bourgon	Quebec	44.05	
10	Oumou Traoré	Mali	43.31	
11	Melanie Guy	Quebec	42.52	
12	Rachida Lakhel	Morocco	38.77	

=== Hammer throw ===
July 22

Rank	Name	Nationality	Result	Notes
1st place, gold medalist(s)	Kamila Skolimowska	Poland	67.95	GR
2nd place, silver medalist(s)	Agnieszka Pogroszewska	Poland	65.44	
3rd place, bronze medalist(s)	Florence Ezeh	France	64.53	
4	Jennifer Joyce	Canada	62.63	
5	Caroline Wittrin	Canada	59.90	
6	Marwa Hussein	Egypt	58.46	
7	Caroline Fournier	Mauritius	54.09	
8	Hayat El Ghazi	Morocco	54.00	
9	Nathalie Thénor	Quebec	53.25	
10	Patty Pilsner-Stienke	Canada	52.40	
11	Laurence Locatelli	Switzerland	52.03	
12	Melanie Guy	Quebec	50.96	
13	Mouna Dani	Morocco	50.39	
	Anne-Laure Gremillet	France	NM	
	Cristina Buzău	Romania	NM	

=== Javelin throw ===
July 19

Rank	Name	Nationality	Result	Notes
1st place, gold medalist(s)	Sarah Walter	France	57.34	
2nd place, silver medalist(s)	Ana Mirela Țermure	Romania	57.25	
3rd place, bronze medalist(s)	Felicia Țilea-Moldovan	Romania	56.58	
4	Aïda Sellam	Tunisia	53.34	
5	Lindy Leveau	Seychelles	53.11	
6	Bernadette Ravina	Mauritius	50.86	
7	Andrea Bulat	Canada	49.67	
8	Krista Woodward	Canada	48.10	
9	Dominique Bilodeau	Quebec	47.92	
10	Trish Young	Canada	41.91	
11	Catherine Stoute	Dominica	36.42	

=== Heptathlon ===
July 22–23

The highest mark recorded in each event is highlighted in yellow

Rank	Athlete	Nationality	100m H	HJ	SP	200m	LJ	JT	1500m	Points	Notes
1st place, gold medalist(s)	Marie Collonvillé	France	13.76w	1.78	11.58	25.29w	5.89	42.16	2:26.72	5719	
2nd place, silver medalist(s)	Kim Vanderhoek	Canada		1.63	13.70		5.76	43.89	2:33.28	5502	
3rd place, bronze medalist(s)	Sophie Marrot	France	13.87w	1.66	11.76	25.73w	5.59	41.65	2:27.88	5414	
4	Stéphanie Domaingue	Mauritius	14.10w	1.63	10.91	26.34w	5.71	36.61	2:28.75	5165	
	Beth Stroud	Canada	15.11	NM	DNS	–	–	–	–	DNF	
