= Athletics at the 1998 Commonwealth Games – Women's 4 × 400 metres relay =

Women's 4 × 400 metres relay at the Commonwealth Games

The women's 4 × 400 metres relay event at the 1998 Commonwealth Games was held on 21 September on National Stadium, Bukit Jalil.

== Results ==
Rank	Nation	Athletes	Time	Notes
1st place, gold medalist(s)	Australia	Susan Andrews, Tamsyn Lewis, Lee Naylor, Tania Van Heer	3:27.28	
2nd place, silver medalist(s)	England	Michelle Thomas, Michelle Pierre, Victoria Day, Donna Fraser	3:29.28	
3rd place, bronze medalist(s)	Canada	Karlene Haughton, Diane Cummins, LaDonna Antoine, Foy Williams	3:29.97	
4	Jamaica	Jacqueline Gayle, Keisha Downer, Mardrea Hyman, Allison Beckford	3:34.74	
5	Cameroon	Claudine Komgang, Stéphanie Zanga, Mireille Nguimbo, Myriam Léonie Mani	3:35.50	
6	Uganda	Mary Apio, Grace Birungi, Veronica Wabukawo, Justine Bayigga	3:36.33	
	Barbados	Andrea Blackett, Sherline Williams, Joanne Durant, Melissa Straker	DNF	
	Malaysia	Palaniappan Kuganeswari, Soloseeni Krishnan, Manimegalay Nadarajah, Govindasamy Shanti	DNF	
