= Athletics at the 2001 Jeux de la Francophonie =

IV Jeux de la Francophonie
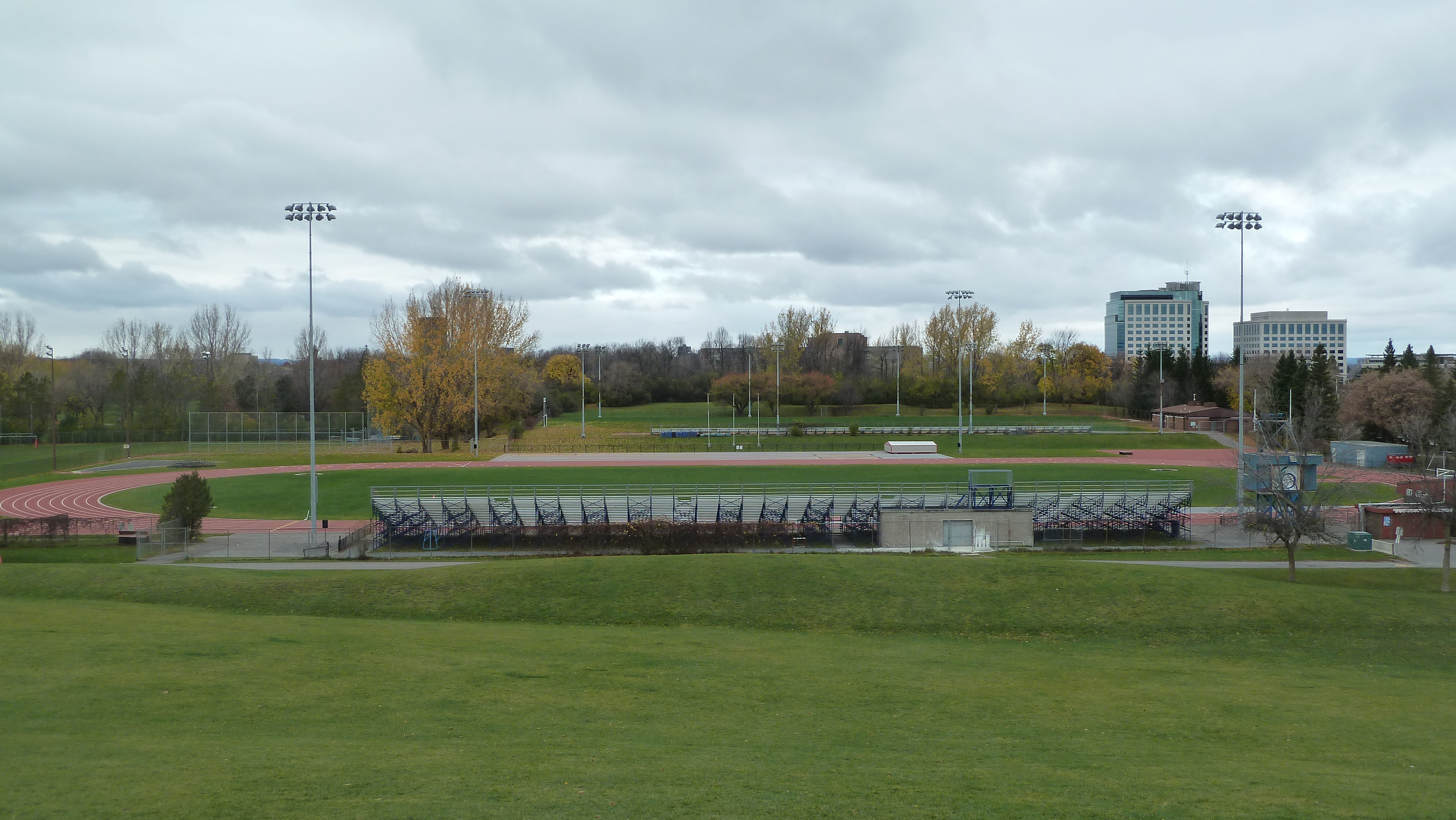
- The host venue
- Dates: 19–23 July
- Host city: Ottawa, Ontario, Canada
- Venue: Terry Fox Stadium
- Events: 47
- Records set: 23 Games records

At the 2001 Jeux de la Francophonie, the athletics events were held at Terry Fox Stadium in Ottawa, Ontario, Canada between 19 and 23 July 2001. A total of 47 events were contested, of which 24 by male and 23 by female athletes. Included in this were two disability athletics events for wheelchair racers. A total of 23 Games records were broken or equalled in the competition.

The host nation won the most gold medals in the competition—taking eleven golds in a haul of 24 medals— but it was beaten on the total overall medal count by France which won 27 events. Morocco performed particularly well in the middle- and long-distance track events. Newcomer Poland made an impact in its debut, taking nine golds with most of its athletes succeeding in the field events. Among the other nations competing, Romania and Mauritius managed four gold medals each.

The competition attracted higher level performances and participation than in previous editions, in part due to the 2001 World Championships in Athletics which was also held in Canada some two weeks later. Bruny Surin was defeated by Stéphan Buckland in the men's 100 metres. Surin decided not to compete in the 200 metres as a result – a move which attracted criticism as he had reportedly been paid 250,000 Canadian dollars to act as a Games ambassador.

The quality of the host stadium also came in for criticism from those attending the event, which one French official stating that "a poor African country" could have held the event to a better standard. Of the winners in Ottawa, Perdita Felicien, Szymon Ziółkowski, Amy Mbacké Thiam and Nezha Bidouane also went on to become gold medallists in their respective events at the World Championships. A number of other athletes went on to win minor medals on the world stage soon after – Paweł Czapiewski, Dudley Dorival, Monika Pyrek, Françoise Mbango-Etone and Nicoleta Grasu.

== Medal summary ==
=== Men ===
Event	Gold		Silver		Bronze	
100 metres (wind: +0.7 m/s)	Stéphan Buckland (MRI)	10.13	Bruny Surin (Quebec)	10.18	Éric Pacôme N'Dri (CIV)	10.24
200 metres (wind: +0.5 m/s)	Stéphan Buckland (MRI)	20.33	Oumar Loum (SEN)	20.59	Joseph Batangdon (CMR)	20.75
400 metres	Shane Niemi (CAN)	44.86 GR	Eric Milazar (MRI)	44.96	Sofiane Labidi (TUN)	45.45
800 metres	Khalid Tighazouine (MAR)	1:46.53 GR	Mouhssin Chehibi (MAR)	1:46.63	Zach Whitmarsh (CAN)	1:46.90
1500 metres	Paweł Czapiewski (POL)	3:45.08	Abdelkader Hachlaf (MAR)	3:45.41	Adil Kaouch (MAR)	3:45.64
5000 metres	Mohammed Amyn (MAR)	13:37.14	Abderrahim Goumri (MAR)	13:38.06	Mohamed Saïd El Wardi (MAR)	13:43.12
10,000 metres	Ahmed Ibrahim Baday (MAR)	28:13.54 GR	Abdelhadi Habassa (MAR)	28:16.28	Aloÿs Nizigama (BDI)	28:37.17
110 metres hurdles	Dudley Dorival (HAI)	13.60	Vincent Clarico (FRA)	13.71	Artur Kohutek (POL)	13.73
400 metres hurdles	Paweł Januszewski (POL)	49.24	Yvon Rakotoarimiandry (MAD)	49.53	Mustapha Sdad (MAR)	49.89
3000 metres steeplechase	Elarbi Khattabi (MAR)	8:16.63 GR	Lyes Ramoul (FRA)	8:25.12	Zouhair Ouerdi (MAR)	8:28.72
4 × 100 metres relay	Mauritius (MRI) ? ? Ommana Kowlessur; Stéphan Buckland	39.04	Ivory Coast (CIV) ? Ahmed Douhou; Éric Pacôme N'Dri; Ibrahim Meité	39.33	Benin (BEN)	40.22
4 × 400 metres relay	Poland (POL) ? Piotr Długosielski; Piotr Haczek; Robert Maćkowiak	3:04.91	France (FRA); Pierre Baron; Fred Mango; Philippe Bouche; Bruno Wavelet	3:06.27	Morocco (MAR)	3:06.86
Marathon	Mohammed El Hattab (MAR)	2:18:16	Mustapha Damaoui (MAR)	2:18:31	Jean-Pierre Monciaux (FRA)	2:20:38
20 km walk	Hatem Ghoula (TUN)	1:22:56 GR	Denis Langlois (FRA)	1:23:21	Gintaras Andriuškevičius (LTU)	1:23:35
High jump	Mark Boswell (CAN)	2.31 m GR	Kwaku Boateng (Quebec)	2.31 m	Jan Janků (CZE)	2.21 m
Pole vault	Adam Kolasa (POL)	5.60 m	Štěpán Janáček (CZE)	5.55 m	Khalid Lachheb (FRA)	5.40 m
Long jump	Jonathan Chimier (MRI)	7.89 m	Arnaud Casquette (MRI)	7.88 m	Mickaël Loria (FRA)	7.86 m
Triple jump	Arius Filet (FRA)	17.15 m GR	Jérôme Romain (FRA)	16.29 m	Djeke Mambo (BEL)	16.02 m
Shot put	Bradley Snyder (CAN)	19.64 m	Yves Niaré (FRA)	18.94 m	Dylan Armstrong (CAN)	17.57 m
Discus throw	Jason Tunks (CAN)	65.10 m GR	Virgilijus Alekna (LTU)	64.35 m	Ionel Oprea (ROM)	63.64 m
Hammer throw	Szymon Ziółkowski (POL)	79.89 m GR	Maciej Palyszko (POL)	75.35 m	Raphaël Piolanti (FRA)	72.71 m
Javelin throw	Laurent Dorique (FRA)	76.67 m GR	Arûnas Jurkšas (LTU)	73.66 m	Walid Abderrazak Mohamed (EGY)	72.64 m
Decathlon	Pierre-Alexandre Vial (FRA)	7890 pts	Hamdi Dhouibi (TUN)	7548 pts	Stéphane Bamboux (FRA)	7320 pts

Disability events
Event	Gold		Silver		Bronze	
1500 metres wheelchair	Jeff Adams (CAN)	3:24.25	Kelly Smith (CAN)	3:24.88	Pierre Fairbank (FRA)	3:25.24

=== Women ===
Event	Gold		Silver		Bronze	
100 metres (wind: +0.5 m/s)	Makaridja Sanganoko (CIV)	11.27	Venolyn Clarke (CAN)	11.29	Hanitriniaina Rakotondrabe (MAD)	11.40
200 metres (wind: +0.5 m/s)	Kaltouma Nadjina (CHA)	23.07	Ionela Târlea (ROM)	23.11	Aïda Diop (SEN)	23.20
400 metres	Amy Mbacké Thiam (SEN)	50.92 GR	Kaltouma Nadjina (CHA)	51.03	Mireille Nguimgo (CMR)	51.47
800 metres	Diane Cummins (CAN)	2:00.77 GR	Irina Krakoviak (LTU)	2:01.27	Peggy Babin (FRA)	2:01.66
1500 metres	Elena Iagăr (ROM)	4:17.03	Fatma Lanouar (TUN)	4:17.95	Lidia Chojecka (POL)	4:18.16
5000 metres	Tina Connelly (CAN)	16:05.59 GR	Zhor El Kamch (MAR)	16:15.56	Inga Juodeškiené (LTU)	16:19.34
10,000 metres	Zhor El Kamch (MAR)	34:07.52	Lisa Harvey (CAN)	34:23.70	Diane Nukuri (BDI)	34:30.66
100 metres hurdles (wind: -0.5 m/s)	Perdita Felicien (CAN)	12.92 GR=	Patricia Buval (FRA)	13.02	Nadine Faustin (HAI)	13.05
400 metres hurdles	Nezha Bidouane (MAR)	54.91 GR	Karlene Haughton (CAN)	56.19	Małgorzata Pskit (POL)	56.25
4 × 100 metres relay	Canada (CAN); Esi Benkyarku; Erika Witter; Venolyn Clarke; Martha Adusei	43.73	Ivory Coast (CIV); Marie Gnahoré; Amandine Allou Affoue; Makaridja Sanganoko; Louise Ayétotché	43.89	Madagascar (MAD); Monica Rahanitraniriana; Paule Ony Ratsimbazafy; Hanitriniaina Rakotondrabé; Lalanirina Rosa Rakotozafy	44.12
4 × 400 metres relay	Poland (POL); Aleksandra Pielużek; Aneta Lemiesz; Grażyna Prokopek; Małgorzata Pskit	3:28.97 GR	France (FRA); Anita Mormand; Peggy Babin; Viviane Dorsile; Marie-Louise Bévis	3:30.04	Canada (CAN); Foy Williams; Lamik Oyewumi; Lindsay Lockhead; Samantha George	3:31.08
Marathon	Michèle Leservoisier (FRA)	2:44:00 GR	Clarisse Rasoarizay (MAD)	2:46:29	Leslie Carson (CAN)	2:50:02
10 km walk	Norica Câmpean (ROM)	44:32	Sonata Milušauskaitė (LTU)	46:10	Tatiana Boulanger (FRA)	47:11
High jump	Wanita May (CAN)	1.91 m GR	Nicole Forrester (CAN)	1.89 m	Oana Pantelimon (ROM)	1.84 m
Pole vault	Monika Pyrek (POL)	4.30 m GR	Pavla Hamácková (CZE)	4.20 m	Julie Vigourt (FRA)	4.10 m
Long jump	Alice Falaiye (CAN)	6.38 m	Françoise Mbango Etone (CMR)	6.37 m	Krysha Bayley (CAN)	6.27 m
Triple jump	Cristina Nicolau (ROM)	14.62 m GR	Françoise Mbango Etone (CMR)	14.56 m	Adelina Gavrilă (ROM)	13.91 m (w)
Shot put	Krystyna Zabawska (POL)	18.25 m GR	Elena Hila (ROM)	17.07 m	Laurence Manfredi (FRA)	16.82 m
Discus throw	Nicoleta Grasu (ROM)	64.53 m	Joanna Wiśniewska (POL)	56.94 m	Mélina Robert-Michon (FRA)	56.81 m
Hammer throw	Kamila Skolimowska (POL)	67.95 m GR	Agnieszka Pogroszewska (POL)	65.44 m	Florence Ezeh (FRA)	64.53 m
Javelin throw (new javelin model)	Sarah Walter (FRA)	57.34 m GR	Ana Mirela Țermure (ROM)	57.25 m	Felicia Ţilea (ROM)	56.58 m
Heptathlon	Marie Collonvillé (FRA)	5719 pts GR	Kim Vanderhoek (CAN)	5502 pts	Sophie Marrot (FRA)	5414 pts

Disability events
Event	Gold		Silver		Bronze	
800 metres wheelchair	Chantal Petitclerc (Quebec)	2:07.93	Diane Roy (CAN)	2:17.48	Denise Fortier (CAN)	2:32.38

== Medal table ==
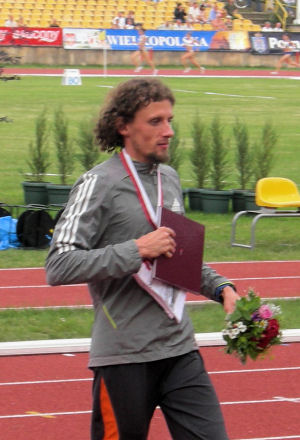
Paweł Czapiewski won the 1500 m gold for Poland.

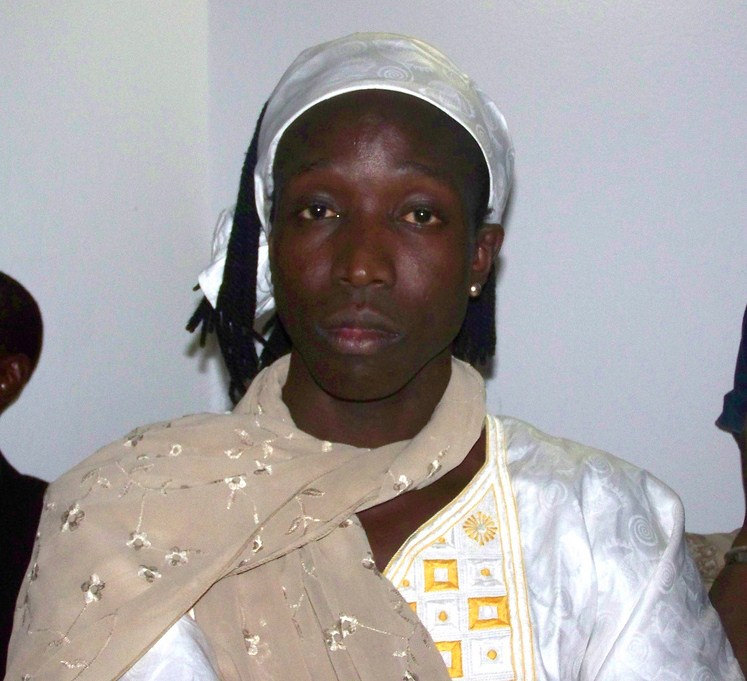
Senegalese runner Amy Mbacké Thiam ran a games record in the 400 m.

* Host nation (Canada)

Rank	Nation	Gold	Silver	Bronze	Total
1	Canada (CAN)*	11	7	6	24
2	Poland (POL)	9	3	3	15
3	Morocco (MAR)	7	6	5	18
4	France (FRA)	6	8	13	27
5	Romania (ROM)	4	3	4	11
6	Mauritius (MRI)	4	2	0	6
7	Ivory Coast (CIV)	1	2	1	4
7	Tunisia (TUN)	1	2	1	4
9	Quebec (QBC)	1	2	0	3
10	Senegal (SEN)	1	1	1	3
11	Chad (CHA)	1	1	0	2
12	Haiti (HAI)	1	0	1	2
13	Lithuania (LTU)	0	4	2	6
14	Cameroon (CMR)	0	2	2	4
14	Madagascar (MAD)	0	2	2	4
16	Czech Republic (CZE)	0	2	1	3
17	Burundi (BDI)	0	0	2	2
18	Belgium (BEL)	0	0	1	1
18	Benin (BEN)	0	0	1	1
18	Egypt (EGY)	0	0	1	1
Totals (20 entries)		47	47	47	141
