= Athletics at the 1998 Commonwealth Games – Women's 400 metres =

Women's 400 metres at the Commonwealth Games

The women's 400 metres event at the 1998 Commonwealth Games was held 16–18 September on National Stadium, Bukit Jalil.

== Medalists ==
Gold	Silver	Bronze
Sandie Richards; Jamaica	Allison Curbishley; Scotland	Donna Fraser; England

== Results ==
=== Heats ===
Qualification: First 3 of each heat (Q) and the next 4 fastest (q) qualified for the semifinals.

Rank	Heat	Name	Nationality	Time	Notes
1	2	Damayanthi Dharsha	Sri Lanka	52.04	Q
2	4	Sandie Richards	Jamaica	52.37	Q
3	1	LaDonna Antoine	Canada	52.61	Q
4	1	Veronica Bawuah	Ghana	52.64	Q, PB
5	1	Donna Fraser	England	52.65	Q
6	3	Allison Curbishley	Scotland	52.66	Q
7	3	Melissa Straker	Barbados	52.77	Q
8	1	Justine Bayigga	Uganda	52.86	q
9	1	Mireille Nguimgo	Cameroon	52.90	q
10	3	Susan Andrews	Australia	52.98	Q
11	4	Foy Williams	Canada	53.02	Q
12	2	Lee Naylor	Australia	53.13	Q
13	2	Claudine Komgang	Cameroon	53.20	Q
14	4	Michelle Thomas	England	53.23	Q
15	4	Dora Kyriacou	Cyprus	53.68	q
16	4	Manimegalay Nadarajah	Malaysia	53.71	q
17	2	Michelle Pierre	England	53.92	
18	3	Mary Apio	Uganda	55.00	
19	4	Joanne Durant	Barbados	55.08	
20	1	Chitra Mooloo	Mauritius	55.20	
21	1	Mary Estelle Kapalu	Vanuatu	55.60	SB
22	2	Leticia John Mutta	Tanzania	55.72	
23	3	Stephanie Llewellyn	Northern Ireland	56.05	
24	1	Palaniappan Kuganeswari	Malaysia	56.73	
25	2	Marcia Daniel	Dominica	56.84	
26	3	Supramaniam Rathimalar	Malaysia	58.75	
27	2	Vasa Tulahe	Tonga	1:02.21	
28	4	Yaznee Nasheeda	Maldives	1:05.07	SB
	3	Venolyn Clarke	Canada	DNF	
	2	Tina Paulino	Mozambique	DNS	

=== Semifinals ===
Qualification: First 4 of each heat qualified directly (Q) for the final.

Rank	Heat	Name	Nationality	Time	Notes
1	2	Sandie Richards	Jamaica	50.65	Q
2	2	Donna Fraser	England	50.85	Q, PB
3	2	Allison Curbishley	Scotland	51.64	Q
4	1	Damayanthi Dharsha	Sri Lanka	51.70	Q
5	1	Lee Naylor	Australia	52.20	Q
6	1	LaDonna Antoine	Canada	52.30	Q
7	2	Melissa Straker	Barbados	52.32	Q, PB
8	2	Foy Williams	Canada	52.35	
9	1	Veronica Bawuah	Ghana	52.58	Q
10	2	Susan Andrews	Australia	52.65	
11	1	Justine Bayigga	Uganda	52.86	
12	1	Claudine Komgang	Cameroon	52.92	
13	2	Mireille Nguimgo	Cameroon	53.05	
14	1	Michelle Thomas	England	53.32	
15	1	Manimegalay Nadarajah	Malaysia	54.02	
16	2	Dora Kyriacou	Cyprus	54.04	

=== Final ===
Rank	Lane	Name	Nationality	Time	Notes
1st place, gold medalist(s)	4	Sandie Richards	Jamaica	50.17	GR
2nd place, silver medalist(s)	2	Allison Curbishley	Scotland	50.71	
3rd place, bronze medalist(s)	3	Donna Fraser	England	51.01	
4	5	Damayanthi Darsha	Sri Lanka	51.06	
5	6	Lee Naylor	Australia	52.15	
6	8	Veronica Bawuah	Ghana	52.70	
7	7	Melissa Straker	Barbados	52.84	
8	1	LaDonna Antoine	Canada	52.93	
