= Athletics at the 2000 Summer Olympics – Women's 400 metres =

Women's 400 metres at the Games of the XXVII Olympiad
- Venue: Stadium Australia
- Date: 22 September 2000 (heats); 23 September 2000 (quarter-finals); 24 September 2000 (semi-finals); 25 September 2000 (final)
- Competitors: 56 from 42 nations
- Winning time: 49.11

Medalists
1st place, gold medalist(s)		Cathy Freeman; Australia
2nd place, silver medalist(s)		Lorraine Fenton; Jamaica
3rd place, bronze medalist(s)		Katharine Merry; Great Britain

ABC footage and interviews of crowds celebrating Cathy Freeman's win.

Official Video

The Women's 400 metres at the 2000 Summer Olympics as part of the athletics programme was held at Stadium Australia on Friday 22 September, Saturday 23 September, Sunday 24 September, and Monday 25 September 2000. The winning margin was 0.47 seconds.

The top three runners in each of the initial seven heats automatically qualified for the second round. The next eight fastest runners from across the heats also qualified for the second round. The top four runners in each of the four second round heats automatically qualified for the semi-final.

The top four runners in each semi-final automatically qualified for the final.

There were a total number of 59 participating athletes.

== Records ==
These were the standing world and Olympic records (in seconds) prior to the 2000 Summer Olympics.

World Record	47.60	Marita Koch	East Germany	Canberra, Australia	6 October 1985
Olympic Record	48.25	Marie-José Pérec	France	Atlanta, United States	29 July 1996

== Medals ==
Gold:	Silver:	Bronze:
Cathy Freeman, Australia	Lorraine Graham, Jamaica	Katharine Merry, Great Britain

== Results ==
All times shown are in seconds.

- Q denotes qualification by place in heat.
- q denotes qualification by overall place.
- DNS denotes did not start.
- DNF denotes did not finish.
- DQ denotes disqualification.
- NR denotes national record.
- OR denotes Olympic record.
- WR denotes world record.
- PB denotes personal best.
- SB denotes season best.

== Qualifying heats ==
=== Round 1 ===
Heat 1 of 8 Date: Friday 22 September 2000
Place		Athlete	Nation	Lane	Reaction	Time	Qual.	Record
Heat	Overall	Athlete	Nation	Lane	Reaction	Time	Qual.	Record
1	9	La Tasha Colander-Richardson	United States	5	0.212	51.75	Q	
2	T14	Mireille Nguimgo	Cameroon	6	0.242	51.88	Q	
3	16	Heide Seyerling	South Africa	3	0.428	51.92	Q	
4	30	Foy Williams	Canada	2	0.343	52.94	q	
5	33	Christine Amertil	Bahamas	4	0.254	53.12		
6	47	Oksana Luneva	Kyrgyzstan	8	0.403	54.98		
7	48	Hazel-Ann Regis	Grenada	7		55.11		

Heat 2 of 8 Date: Friday 22 September 2000
Place		Athlete	Nation	Lane	Reaction	Time	Qual.	Record
Heat	Overall	Athlete	Nation	Lane	Reaction	Time	Qual.	Record
1	10	Charity Opara	Nigeria	4	0.204	51.77	Q	
2	18	Natalya Nazarova	Russia	2	0.297	52.05	Q	
3	19	Damayanthi Darsha	Sri Lanka	6	0.242	52.13	Q	
4	T22	Nadjina Kaltouma	Chad	2	0.202	52.34	q	
5	32	Lee Naylor	Australia	1		53.10	q	
6	41	Svetlana Bodritskaya	Kazakhstan	5	0.199	53.91		
7	46	Lilian Bwalya	Zambia	8	0.403	54.77		
8	54	Maritza Figueroa	Nicaragua	7		58.82		

Heat 3 of 8 Date: Friday 22 September 2000
Place		Athlete	Nation	Lane	Reaction	Time	Qual.	Record
Heat	Overall	Athlete	Nation	Lane	Reaction	Time	Qual.	Record
1	12	Amy Mbacké Thiam	Senegal	8	0.217	51.79	Q	
2	22	Ana Guevara	Mexico	5	0.315	52.34	Q	
3	27	Otilia Silvia Ruicu	Romania	4		52.65	Q	
4	34	Karen Shinkins	Ireland	2	0.258	53.27		
5	T35	Norma Gonzalez	Colombia	6	0.220	53.34		
6	57	Safia Abukar Hussein	Somalia	3		1:13.25		

Heat 4 of 8 Date: Friday 22 September 2000
Place		Athlete	Nation	Lane	Reaction	Time	Qual.	Record
Heat	Overall	Athlete	Nation	Lane	Reaction	Time	Qual.	Record
1	5	Cathy Freeman	Australia	3	0.258	51.63	Q	
2	7	Monique Hennagan	United States	4	0.320	51.73	Q	
3	8	Claudine Komgang	Cameroon	8	0.551	51.74	Q	
4	24	Norfalia Carabalí	Spain	7		52.36	q	
5	38	Olena Rurak	Ukraine	2	0.202	53.45		
6	40	Kristina Perica	Croatia	6	0.523	53.72		
7	44	Awatef Ben Hassine	Tunisia	5	0.308	54.50		

Heat 5 of 8 Date: Friday 22 September 2000
Place		Athlete	Nation	Lane	Reaction	Time	Qual.	Record
Heat	Overall	Athlete	Nation	Lane	Reaction	Time	Qual.	Record
1	T3	Katharine Merry	Great Britain	7	0.336	51.61	Q	
2	13	Sandie Richards	Jamaica	4	0.294	51.86	Q	
3	26	Nova Peris-Kneebone	Australia	8	0.191	52.51	Q	
4	28	Hana Benešová	Czech Republic	6		52.85	q	
5	31	Aliann Pompey	Guyana	2	0.226	53.09	q	
6	45	Verneta Lesforis	Saint Lucia	5	0.520	54.67		
7	52	Klodiana Shala	Albania	1		56.41		
8		Marie-José Pérec	France	3		DNS		

Heat 6 of 8 Date: Friday 22 September 2000
Place		Athlete	Nation	Lane	Reaction	Time	Qual.	Record
Heat	Overall	Athlete	Nation	Lane	Reaction	Time	Qual.	Record
1	2	Jitka Burianová	Czech Republic	4	0.302	51.59	Q	
2	3T	Olabisi Afolabi	Nigeria	2	0.221	51.62	Q	
3	6	Lorraine Graham	Jamaica	5		51.65	Q	
4	20	Allison Curbishley	Great Britain	6	0.209	52.20	q	
5	29	Barbara Petráhn	Hungary	2	0.189	52.86	q	
6	37	Tonique Williams	Bahamas	7	0.174	53.43		
7	53	Marcia Fernanda Daniel	Dominica	8	0.222	58.20		
8	56	Haissa Ali Garba	Niger	1		1:07.49		

Heat 7 of 8 Date: Friday 22 September 2000
Place		Athlete	Nation	Lane	Reaction	Time	Qual.	Record
Heat	Overall	Athlete	Nation	Lane	Reaction	Time	Qual.	Record
1	1	K. M. Beenamol	India	8		51.51	Q	
2	17	Olga Kotlyarova	Russia	6	0.190	51.99	Q	
3	25	Žana Minina	Lithuania	7	0.201	52.38	Q	
4	39	Michelle Collins	United States	4	0.295	53.66		
5	42	Tanya Oxley	Barbados	2		54.22		
6	43	Daniela Georgieva	Bulgaria	1		54.46		
7	51	Dijana Kojić	Bosnia and Herzegovina	2		55.61		
8	55	Awmima Mohamed	Sudan	5		1:02.94		

Heat 8 of 8 Date: Friday 22 September 2000
Place		Athlete	Nation	Lane	Reaction	Time	Qual.	Record
Heat	Overall	Athlete	Nation	Lane	Reaction	Time	Qual.	Record
1	11	Ladonna Antoine	Canada	5		51.78	Q	
2	T14	Falilat Ogunkoya	Nigeria	6	0.187	51.88	Q	
3	21	Donna Fraser	Great Britain	8	0.209	52.33	Q	
4	T35	Svetlana Pospelova	Russia	3		53.34		
5	49	Yelena Piskunova	Uzbekistan	2	0.285	55.40		
6	50	Ann Mooney	Papua New Guinea	4	0.378	55.55		
7		Brigita Langerholc	Slovenia	7		DNS		

Overall Results Round 1

Round 1 Overall Results
Place	Athlete	Nation	Heat	Lane	Place	Time	Qual.	Record
1	K. M. Beenamol	India	7	8	1	51.51	Q	
2	Jitka Burianová	Czech Republic	6	4	1	51.59	Q	
3	Olabisi Afolabi	Nigeria	6	3	2	51.61	Q	
3	Katharine Merry	Great Britain	5	7	1	51.61	Q	
5	Cathy Freeman	Australia	4	3	1	51.63	Q	
6	Lorraine Graham	Jamaica	6	5	3	51.65	Q	
7	Monique Hennagan	United States	4	4	2	51.73	Q	
8	Claudine Komgang	Cameroon	4	8	3	51.74	Q	
9	La Tasha Colander-Richardson	United States	1	5	1	51.75	Q	
10	Charity Opara	Nigeria	2	4	1	51.77	Q	
11	Ladonna Antoine	Canada	8	5	1	51.78	Q	
12	Amy Mbacké Thiam	Senegal	3	8	1	51.71	Q	
13	Sandie Richards	Jamaica	5	4	2	51.86	Q	
14	Mireille Nguimgo	Cameroon	1	6	2	51.88	Q	
14	Falilat Ogunkoya	Nigeria	8	6	2	51.88	Q	
16	Heide Seyerling	South Africa	1	3	3	51.92	Q	
17	Olga Kotlyarova	Russia	7	6	2	51.99	Q	
18	Natalya Nazarova	Russia	2	2	2	52.05	Q	
19	Damayanthi Darsha	Sri Lanka	2	6	3	52.13	Q	
20	Allison Curbishley	Great Britain	6	6	4	52.20	q	
21	Donna Fraser	Great Britain	8	8	3	52.33	Q	
22	Ana Guevara	Mexico	3	5	2	52.34	Q	
22	Nadjina Kaltouma	Chad	2	3	4	52.34	q	
24	Norfalia Carabalí	Spain	4	7	4	52.36	q	
25	Zana Minina	Lithuania	7	7	3	52.38	Q	
26	Nova Peris-Kneebone	Australia	5	8	3	52.51	Q	
27	Otilia Silvia Ruicu	Romania	3	4	3	52.65	Q	
28	Hana Benešová	Czech Republic	5	6	4	52.85	q	
29	Barbara Petráhn	Hungary	6	2	5	52.86	q	
30	Foy Williams	Canada	1	2	4	52.94	q	
31	Aliann Pompey	Guyana	5	2	5	53.09	q	
32	Lee Naylor	Australia	2	1	5	53.10	q	
33	Christine Amertil	Bahamas	1	4	5	53.12		
34	Karen Shinkins	Ireland	3	2	4	53.27		
35	Norma Gonzalez	Colombia	3	6	5	53.34		
35	Svetlana Pospelova	Russia	8	3	4	53.34		
37	Tonique Williams	Bahamas	6	7	6	53.43		
38	Olena Rurak	Ukraine	4	2	5	53.45		
39	Michelle Collins	United States	7	4	4	53.66		
40	Kristina Perica	Croatia	4	6	6	53.72		
41	Svetlana Bodritskaya	Kazakhstan	2	5	6	53.91		
42	Tanya Oxley	Barbados	7	3	5	54.22		
43	Daniela Georgieva	Bulgaria	7	1	6	54.46		
44	Awatef Ben Hassine	Tunisia	4	5	7	54.50		
45	Verneta Lesforis	Saint Lucia	5	5	6	54.67		
46	Lilian Bwalya	Zambia	2	8	7	54.77		
47	Oksana Luneva	Kyrgyzstan	1	8	6	54.98		
48	Hazel-Ann Regis	Grenada	1	7	7	55.11		
49	Elena Piskunova	Uzbekistan	8	2	5	54.40		
50	Ann Mooney	Papua New Guinea	8	4	6	55.55		
51	Dijana Kojic	Bosnia and Herzegovina	7	2	7	55.61		
52	Klodiana Shala	Albania	5	1	7	56.41		
53	Marcia Fernanda Daniel	Dominica	6	8	7	58.20		
54	Maritza Figueroa	Nicaragua	2	7	8	58.82		
55	Awmima Mohamed	Sudan	7	5	8	1:02.94		
56	Haissa Ali Garba	Niger	6	1	8	1:07.49		
57	Safia Abukar Hussein	Somalia	3	3	6	1:13.25		
	Brigita Langerholc	Slovenia	3	7		DNS		
	Marie-José Pérec	France	5	3		DNS		

=== Round 2 ===
Heat 1 of 4 Date: Saturday 23 September 2000
Place		Athlete	Nation	Lane	Reaction	Time	Qual.	Record
Heat	Overall	Athlete	Nation	Lane	Reaction	Time	Qual.	Record
1	6	Jitka Burianová	Czech Republic	3	0.274	50.85	Q	PB
2	8	Ladonna Antoine	Canada	5	0.179	50.92	Q	PB
3	14	Nova Peris-Kneebone	Australia	2	0.196	51.28	Q	PB
4	15	Natalya Nazarova	Russia	6	0.198	51.44	Q	
5	16	Claudine Komgang	Cameroon	7		51.57		
6	19	Monique Hennagan	United States	4	0.478	51.85		
7	26	Nadjina Kaltouma	Chad	1	0.215	52.60		
8	31	Aliann Pompey	Guyana	8	0.212	53.42		

Heat 2 of 4 Date: Saturday 23 September 2000
Place		Athlete	Nation	Lane	Reaction	Time	Qual.	Record
Heat	Overall	Athlete	Nation	Lane	Reaction	Time	Qual.	Record
1	3	Katharine Merry	Great Britain	2	0.270	50.50	Q	
2	7	Heide Seyerling	South Africa	7	0.163	50.87	Q	PB
3	9	Olga Kotlyarova	Russia	6	0.182	50.97	Q	
4	10	Sandie Richards	Jamaica	5	0.209	51.00	Q	
5	11	Charity Opara	Nigeria	4	0.206	51.04		
6	25	Zana Minina	Lithuania	8	0.300	52.53		
7	27	Norfalia Carabalí	Spain	1		52.63		
8	28	Foy Williams	Canada	2	0.337	52.68		

Heat 3 of 4 Date: Saturday 23 September 2000
Place		Athlete	Nation	Lane	Reaction	Time	Qual.	Record
Heat	Overall	Athlete	Nation	Lane	Reaction	Time	Qual.	Record
1	4	Lorraine Graham	Jamaica	8	0.216	50.66	Q	
2	13	Ana Guevara	Mexico	5		51.19	Q	
3	17	Amy Mbacké Thiam	Senegal	6	0.217	51.64	Q	
4	18	K. M. Beenamol	India	4		51.81	Q	
5	20	Olabisi Afolabi	Nigeria	3	0.263	51.87		
6	22	Otilia Silvia Ruicu	Romania	1		52.28		
7	24	Allison Curbishley	Great Britain	1	0.193	52.50		
8	32	Lee Naylor	Australia	7		53.83		

Heat 4 of 4 Date: Saturday 23 September 2000
Place		Athlete	Nation	Lane	Reaction	Time	Qual.	Record
Heat	Overall	Athlete	Nation	Lane	Reaction	Time	Qual.	Record
1	1	Cathy Freeman	Australia	4	0.464	50.31	Q	
2	2	Falilat Ogunkoya	Nigeria	6	0.196	50.49	Q	
3	5	Donna Fraser	Great Britain	8	0.194	50.77	Q	PB
4	12	Mireille Nguimgo	Cameroon	5	0.200	51.08	Q	
5	21	La Tasha Colander-Richardson	United States	2	0.202	53.45		
6	23	Damayanthi Darsha	Sri Lanka	1	0.234	52.35		
7	29	Hana Benešová	Czech Republic	2	0.209	52.70		
8	30	Barbara Petráhn	Hungary	7	0.224	52.72		

Overall Results Round 2

Round 2 Overall Results
Place	Athlete	Nation	Heat	Lane	Place	Time	Qual.	Record
1	Cathy Freeman	Australia	4	4	1	50.31	Q	
2	Falilat Ogunkoya	Nigeria	4	6	2	50.49	Q	
3	Katharine Merry	Great Britain	2	3	1	50.50	Q	
4	Lorraine Graham	Jamaica	3	8	1	50.66	Q	
5	Donna Fraser	Great Britain	4	8	3	50.77	Q	PB
6	Jitka Burianová	Czech Republic	1	3	1	50.85	Q	PB
7	Heide Seyerling	South Africa	2	7	2	50.87	Q	PB
8	Ladonna Antoine	Canada	1	5	2	50.92	Q	PB
9	Olga Kotlyarova	Russia	2	6	3	50.97	Q	
10	Sandie Richards	Jamaica	2	5	4	51.00	Q	
11	Charity Opara	Nigeria	2	4	5	51.04		
12	Mireille Nguimgo	Cameroon	4	5	4	51.08	Q	
13	Ana Guevara	Mexico	3	5	2	51.19	Q	
14	Nova Peris-Kneebone	Australia	1	2	3	51.28	Q	
15	Natalya Nazarova	Russia	1	6	4	51.44	Q	
16	Claudine Komgang	Cameroon	1	7	5	51.57		
17	Amy Mbacké Thiam	Senegal	3	6	3	51.64	Q	
18	K. M. Beenamol	India	3	4	4	51.81	Q	
19	Monique Hennagan	United States	1	4	6	51.85		
20	Olabisi Afolabi	Nigeria	3	3	5	51.87		
21	La Tasha Colander-Richardson	United States	4	3	5	52.07		
22	Otilia Silvia Ruicu	Romania	3	1	6	52.28		
23	Damayanthi Darsha	Sri Lanka	4	1	6	52.35		
24	Allison Curbishley	Great Britain	3	2	7	52.50		
25	Zana Minina	Lithuania	2	8	6	52.53		
26	Nadjina Kaltouma	Chad	1	1	7	52.60		
27	Norfalia Carabalí	Spain	2	1	7	52.63		
28	Foy Williams	Canada	2	2	8	52:68		
29	Hana Benešová	Czech Republic	4	2	7	52.70		
30	Barbara Petráhn	Hungary	4	7	8	52.72		
31	Aliann Pompey	Guyana	1	8	8	53.42		
32	Lee Naylor	Australia	3	7	8	53.83		

=== Semi-finals ===
Heat 1 of 2 Date: Sunday 24 September 2000
Place		Athlete	Nation	Lane	Reaction	Time	Qual.	Record
Heat	Overall	Athlete	Nation	Lane	Reaction	Time	Qual.	Record
1	5	Lorraine Graham	Jamaica	4	0.444	50.28	Q	
2	6	Katharine Merry	Great Britain	3	0.301	50.32	Q	
3	8	Heide Seyerling	South Africa	5		51.06	Q	
4	10	Olga Kotlyarova	Russia	7	0.243	51.21	Q	
5	11	Ladonna Antoine	Canada	6	0.273	51.26		
6	13	Natalya Nazarova	Russia	2	0.191	51.83		
7	14	Mireille Nguimgo	Cameroon	1	0.213	52.03		
8	16	Nova Peris-Kneebone	Australia	8	0.263	52.49		

Heat 2 of 2 Date: Sunday 24 September 2000
Place		Athlete	Nation	Lane	Reaction	Time	Qual.	Record
Heat	Overall	Athlete	Nation	Lane	Reaction	Time	Qual.	Record
1	1	Cathy Freeman	Australia	3	0.261	50.01	Q	
2	2	Ana Guevara	Mexico	5	0.370	50.11	Q	
3	3	Falilat Ogunkoya	Nigeria	4	0.416	50.18	Q	
4	4	Donna Fraser	Great Britain	7	0.188	50.21	Q	PB
5	7	Sandie Richards	Jamaica	2	0.253	50.42		SB
6	9	Jitka Burianová	Czech Republic	6	0.255	51.15		
7	12	Amy Mbacké Thiam	Senegal	1	0.238	51.60		
8	15	K. M. Beenamol	India	8		52.04		

Overall results: Semi-finals

Semi-finals Overall results
Place	Athlete	Nation	Heat	Lane	Place	Time	Qual.	Record
1	Cathy Freeman	Australia	2	3	1	50.01	Q	
2	Ana Guevara	Mexico	2	5	2	50.11	Q	
3	Falilat Ogunkoya	Nigeria	2	4	3	50.18	Q	
4	Donna Fraser	Great Britain	2	7	4	50.21	Q	PB
5	Lorraine Graham	Jamaica	1	4	1	50.28	Q	
6	Katharine Merry	Great Britain	1	3	2	50.32	Q	
7	Sandie Richards	Jamaica	2	2	5	50.42		SB
8	Heide Seyerling	South Africa	1	5	3	51.06	Q	
9	Jitka Burianová	Czech Republic	2	6	6	51.15		
10	Olga Kotlyarova	Russia	1	7	4	51.21	Q	
11	Ladonna Antoine	Canada	1	6	5	51.26		
12	Amy Mbacké Thiam	Senegal	2	1	7	51.60		
13	Natalya Nazarova	Russia	1	2	6	51.83		
14	Mireille Nguimgo	Cameroon	1	1	7	52.03		
15	K. M. Beenamol	India	2	8	8	52.04		
16	Nova Peris-Kneebone	Australia	1	8	8	52.49		

=== Final ===
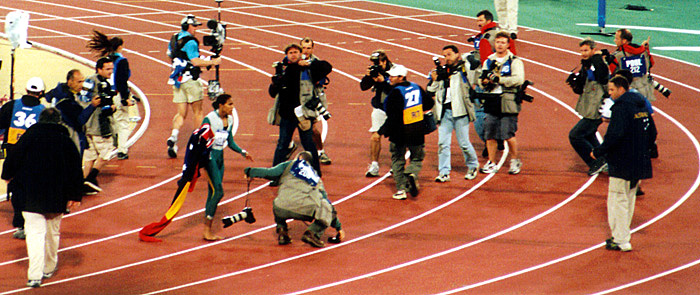
Cathy Freeman after the race

Date: Monday 25 September 2000
Place	Athlete	Nation	Lane	Reaction	Time	Record
Gold medal	Cathy Freeman	Australia	6	0.227	49.11	SB
Silver medal	Lorraine Graham	Jamaica	4	0.452	49.58	PB
Bronze medal	Katharine Merry	Great Britain	3	0.270	49.72	PB
4	Donna Fraser	Great Britain	2	0.174	49.79	PB
5	Ana Guevara	Mexico	5	0.261	49.96	
6	Heide Seyerling	South Africa	7	0.175	50.05	NR
7	Falilat Ogunkoya	Nigeria	8	0.254	50.12	
8	Olga Kotlyarova	Russia	1	0.254	51.04	
