= Athletics at the 2000 Summer Olympics – Women's 4 × 400 metres relay =

Women's 4 × 400 metres relay at the Games of the XXVII Olympiad
- Venue: Stadium Australia
- Date: 29 September 2000 (round 1); 30 September 2000 (final)
- Competitors: 93 from 21 nations
- Teams: 93
- Winning time: 3:22.62

Medalists
1st place, gold medalist(s)		Jearl Miles Clark, Monique Hennagan, ~~Marion Jones~~, LaTasha Colander, Andrea Anderson*	United States
2nd place, silver medalist(s)		Sandie Richards, Catherine Scott, Deon Hemmings, Lorraine Graham, Charmaine Howell*, Michelle Burgher*	Jamaica
3rd place, bronze medalist(s)		Yuliya Sotnikova, Svetlana Goncharenko, Olga Kotlyarova, Irina Privalova, Natalya Nazarova*; Olesya Zykina* * Athletes who participated in the heats only and received medals.	Russia

The women's 4 × 400 metres relay races at the 2000 Summer Olympics as part of the athletics program were held on Friday, 29 September and Saturday, 30 September. The first two in each heat and the next 2 fastest overall advanced to the final.

Coming from the gun, Nigeria's Olabisi Afolabi was the first to break from the stagger formation in lane 3, gaining on Australia's Nova Peris-Kneebone to her outside. After the first half lap, Afolabi began to pay for her enthusiasm, tying up through the second turn where American Jearl Miles Clark and then Jamaican Sandie Richards began to assert themselves. The Jamaicans handed off slightly ahead of the Americans, but Monique Hennagan ran a strong turn to give the Americans the edge ahead of Catherine Scott, with the rest of the world, led by Nigeria and Australia, five metres back. Scott kept the gap less than a metre all the way to the home stretch, then moved into lane two to sprint for home, passing off to 400 hurdles silver medalist Deon Hemmings just ahead of Marion Jones. But Hemmings did not charge out ahead, instead allowing Jones to secure the baton. Narrowing the gap, Nigeria, Australia, Great Britain and Russia were all just a few metres back. Hemmings held second place to that same straightaway, but a late rush by Olga Kotlyarova had Russia handing off in second place. With no competitors near her, LaTasha Colander expanded the American lead to almost 20 metres with 100 metres to go before slowing going into the finish. Graham held off Privalova for the entire last lap. Cathy Freeman made a heroic effort to pull Australia back into fourth position, but let off the gas just before the line and was pipped by Falilat Ogunkoya. Australia's time was good enough for the Oceanian record, beating the record they set in the qualifying round.

== Records ==
These were the standing world and Olympic records (in minutes:seconds) prior to the 2000 Summer Olympics.

World record	3:15.17	USSR	Tatyana Ledovskaya; Olga Nazarova; Mariya Pinigina; Olga Bryzgina	Seoul (South Korea)	1 October 1988
Olympic record	3:15.17	USSR	Tatyana Ledovskaya; Olga Nazarova; Mariya Pinigina; Olga Bryzgina	Seoul (South Korea)	1 October 1988

On 23 November 2007, the IAAF recommended to the IOC Executive Board to disqualify the USA women's 4 × 100 m and 4 × 400 m relay teams after Marion Jones admitted to having taken performance-enhancing drugs prior to the Games. On 12 December, the IOC disqualified Jones and stripped her of her relay medals but it did not disqualify the U.S. relay teams. On 10 April 2008, the IOC disqualified both U.S. relay teams and asked for Jones' teammates' medals to be returned. France (Linda Ferga, Muriel Hurtis, Fabe Dia, Christine Arron, Sandra Citte*) finished fourth in the 4 × 100 m relay in a time of 42.42, and Nigeria (Olabisi Afolabi, Opara Charity, Rosemary Okafor, Falilat Ogunkoya-Osheku, Doris Jacob*) finished fourth in the 4 × 400 m relay in a time of 3:23.80. All members of the U.S. relay teams except Nanceen Perry then appealed to the Court of Arbitration for Sport who on 16 July 2010 ruled in favor of them due to the fact that, according to the rules at the time, a team should not be disqualified because of a doping offense of one athlete. The rule that an entire team be disqualified and required to vacate medals on the instance of one offender was imposed in 2003. Their medals were then restored to them because the penalty was based on a policy imposed ex post facto, which is prohibited by the CAS.

== Results ==
All times shown are in seconds.

- Q denotes qualification by place in heat.
- q denotes qualification by overall place.
- DNS denotes did not start.
- DNF denotes did not finish.
- DQ denotes disqualification.
- NR denotes national record.
- AR denotes area/continental record.
- OR denotes Olympic record.
- WR denotes world record.
- PB denotes personal best.
- SB denotes season best.

=== Heats ===
First 2 in each heat(Q) and the next 2 fastest(q) advance to the Final.

==== Heat 1 ====
Heat 1 of 3 Date: Friday 29 September 2000
Place		Nation	Athletes	Lane	Time	Qual.	Record
Heat	Overall	Nation	Athletes	Lane	Time	Qual.	Record
1	2	United States	Jearl Miles Clark, Monique Hennagan, Andrea Anderson, LaTasha Colander	4	3:23.95	Q	SB
2	5	Cuba	Zulia Calatayud, Julia Duporty, Idalmis Bonne, Daimí Pernía	3	3:25.22	Q	SB
3	9	Belarus	Natalya Sologub, Yelena Budnik, Irina Khlyustova, Anna Kozak	8	3:26.31		NR
4	10	Germany	Shanta Ghosh, Ulrike Urbansky, Birgit Rockmeier, Florence Ekpo-Umoh	5	3:27.02		SB
5	12	Canada	Karlene Haughton, LaDonna Antoine, Foy Williams, Samantha George	2	3:27.36		SB
6	17	Spain	Julia Alba, Norfalia Carabalí, Miriam Bravo, Mayte Martínez	7	3:32.45		SB
7	20	FR Yugoslavia	Mila Savić, Jelena Stanisavljević, Vukosava Đapić, Tatjana Lojanica	1	3:37.99		
		Cameroon			Did Not Start		

==== Heat 2 ====
Heat 2 of 3 Date: Friday 29 September 2000
Place		Nation	Athletes	Lane	Time	Qual.	Record
Heat	Overall	Nation	Athletes	Lane	Time	Qual.	Record
1	6	Great Britain	Helen Frost, Donna Fraser, Allison Curbishley, Katharine Merry	5	3:25.28	Q	SB
2	7	Jamaica	Charmaine Howell, Catherine Scott, Michelle Burgher, Sandie Richards	8	3:25.65	Q	SB
3	8	Russia	Yuliya Sotnikova, Olesya Zykina, Svetlana Goncharenko, Natalya Nazarova	4	3:26.05	q	
4	11	Italy	Daniela Graglia, Francesca Carbone, Fabiola Piroddi, Virna De Angeli	3	3:27.23		SB
5	15	India	Paramjeet Kaur, Jincy Phillip, Rosa Kutty, K.M.Beena Mol	2	3:31.46		
6	18	Puerto Rico	Militza Castro, Sandra Moya, Beatriz Cruz, Maritza Salas	6	3:33.30		NR
7		Colombia		7	Did Not Start		

==== Heat 3 ====
Heat 3 of 3 Date: Friday 29 September 2000
Place		Nation	Athletes	Lane	Time	Qual.	Record
Heat	Overall	Nation	Athletes	Lane	Time	Qual.	Record
1	1	Nigeria	Doris Jacob, Olabisi Afolabi, Rosemary Okafor, Charity Opara	5	3:22.99	Q	SB
2	3	Australia	Tamsyn Lewis, Susan Andrews, Jana Pittman, Nova Peris-Kneebone	2	3:24.05	Q	AR
3	4	Czech Republic	Jitka Burianová, Hana Benešová, Lenka Ficková, Helena Dziurova-Fuchsová	3	3:24.40	q	SB
4	13	Senegal	Aïda Diop, Mame Tacko Diouf, Aminata Diouf, Amy Mbacké Thiam	1	3:28.02		NR
5	14	Barbados	Melissa Straker, Andrea Blackett, Sherline Williams, Tanya Oxley	7	3:30.83		SB
6	16	Ireland	Karen Shinkins, Martina McCarthy, Emily Maher, Ciara Sheehy	6	3:32.24		NR
7	19	Slovenia	Meta Mačus, Brigita Langerholc, Jolanda Steblovnik-Ceplak, Saša Prokofijev	8	3:35.00		NR
8	21	Uzbekistan	Nataliya Kobina, Yelena Piskunova, Zamira Amirova, Nataliya Senkina	4	3:43.96		

=== Final ===
Final Date: Saturday 30 September 2000
Place	Nation	Athletes	Lane	Time	Record
1st place, gold medalist(s)	United States	Jearl Miles Clark, Monique Hennagan, ~~Marion Jones~~, LaTasha Colander	5	3:22.62	
2nd place, silver medalist(s)	Jamaica	Sandie Richards, Catherine Scott, Deon Hemmings, Lorraine Graham	7	3:23.25	SB
3rd place, bronze medalist(s)	Russia	Yuliya Sotnikova, Svetlana Goncharenko, Olga Kotlyarova, Irina Privalova	1	3:23.46	SB
4	Nigeria	Olabisi Afolabi, Charity Opara, Rosemary Okafor, Falilat Ogunkoya	3	3:23.80	
5	Australia	Nova Peris-Kneebone, Tamsyn Lewis, Melinda Gainsford-Taylor, Cathy Freeman	4	3:23.81	AR
6	Great Britain	Natasha Danvers, Donna Fraser, Allison Curbishley, Katharine Merry	6	3:25.67	
7	Czech Republic	Jitka Burianová, Hana Benešová, Lenka Ficková, Helena Dziurova-Fuchsová	2	3:29.17	
8	Cuba	Zulia Calatayud, Julia Duporty, Idalmis Bonne, Daimí Pernía	8	3:29.47	
