= Laurent Dorique =

French javelin thrower (born 1976)

Personal information
- Born: 10 July 1976 (age 50) Réunion

Sport
- Sport: Track and field
Medal record
Representing France
Mediterranean Games
Gold medal – first place	2001 Radès	Javelin throw

Laurent Dorique (born 10 July 1976) is a French track and field athlete who competes in the javelin throw. He was the gold medallist at the 2001 Mediterranean Games and the 2001 Francophonie Games. He was three times a gold medallist for his native Réunion at the Indian Ocean Island Games, winning in 1993, 1998 and 2011.

== International competitions ==
Year	Competition	Venue	Position	Event	Notes
1993	Indian Ocean Island Games	Victoria, Seychelles	1st	Javelin throw	64.22 m
1997	European U23 Championships	Turku, Finland	6th	Javelin throw	74.84 m
1998	Indian Ocean Island Games	Saint Denis, Réunion	1st	Javelin throw	72.14 m
2001	Mediterranean Games	Radès, Tunisia	1st	Javelin throw	80.88 m
2001	Universiade	Beijing, China	6th	Javelin throw	75.24 m
2001	Francophonie Games	Ottawa, Canada	1st	Javelin throw	76.67 m
2011	Indian Ocean Island Games	Victoria, Seychelles	1st	Javelin throw	76.38 m

== National titles ==
- French Athletics Championships
  - Javelin throw: 2000, 2001, 2008, 2011

== See also ==
- List of javelin throw national champions (men)
