= LaDonna Antoine-Watkins =

Canadian sprinter (born 1974)

Personal information
- Nationality: Canadian
- Born: 20 November 1974 (age 51) Regina, Saskatchewan
- Height: 1.68 m (5 ft 6 in)
- Weight: 61 kg (134 lb)

Sport
- Sport: Athletics
- Event(s): 200m, 400 m
- Club: Regina Athletic Track
Medal record
Representing Canada
Commonwealth Games
Bronze medal – third place	1998 Kuala Lumpur	4x400m relay
Summer Universiade
Bronze medal – third place	1997 Catania	4x100m relay

LaDonna M. Antoine-Watkins (born 20 November 1974) is a Canadian retired sprinter who specialised in the 400 metres. She represented Canada at the 1996 and 2000 Summer Olympics, as well as three outdoor and one indoor World Championships.

Antoine-Watkins was an All-American sprinter for the Utah State Aggies track and field team, finishing 4th in the 400 m at the 1997 NCAA Division I Outdoor Track and Field Championships.

== Competition record ==
Year	Competition	Venue	Position	Event	Notes
Representing Canada
1995	Universiade	Fukuoka, Japan	20th (qf)	200 m	24.38
1995	Universiade	Fukuoka, Japan	13th (sf)	400 m	54.43
1995	Universiade	Fukuoka, Japan	8th	4 × 100 m	45.84
1995	Universiade	Fukuoka, Japan	6th	4 × 400 m	3:35.46
1996	Olympic Games	Atlanta, United States	23rd (qf)	400 m	52.03
1996	Olympic Games	Atlanta, United States	13th (h)	4 × 100 m	44.34
1997	World Championships	Athens, Greece	40th (h)	200 m	23.86
1997	World Championships	Athens, Greece	20th (qf)	400 m	52.37
1997	Universiade	Catania, Italy	6th	200 m	23.73
1997	Universiade	Catania, Italy	3rd	4 × 100 m	44.59
1997	Universiade	Catania, Italy	4th	4 × 400 m	3:31.94
1998	Commonwealth Games	Kuala Lumpur, Malaysia	8th	400 m	52.93
1998	Commonwealth Games	Kuala Lumpur, Malaysia	3rd	4 × 400 m	3:29.97
1999	Pan American Games	Winnipeg, Manitoba, Canada	12th (h)	400 m	53.10
1999	Pan American Games	Winnipeg, Manitoba, Canada	5th	4 × 400 m	3:31.85
1999	World Championships	Seville, Spain	9th (h)	4 × 400 m	3:28.47
2000	Olympic Games	Sydney, Australia	11th (sf)	400 m	51.26
2000	Olympic Games	Sydney, Australia	12th (h)	4 × 400 m	3:27.36
2001	World Indoor Championships	Lisbon, Portugal	15th (h)	400 m	53.82
2001	Jeux de la Francophonie	Ottawa, Ontario, Canada	8th	200 m	23.63
2001	World Championships	Edmonton, Alberta, Canada	26th (h)	200 m	23.76
2001	World Championships	Edmonton, Alberta, Canada	26th (h)	400 m	52.38
2001	World Championships	Edmonton, Alberta, Canada	8th	4 × 400 m	3:27.93
2002	Commonwealth Games	Manchester, United Kingdom	11th (sf)	400 m	52.44
2002	Commonwealth Games	Manchester, United Kingdom	5th	4 × 400 m	3:32.24

== Personal bests ==
Outdoor

- 200 metres – 23.13 (0.0 m/s) (Edmonton 2001)
- 400 metres – 50.92 (Sydney 2000)

Indoor

- 200 metres – 24.03 (Quad 1997)
- 400 metres – 53.79 (Reno 1997)
