= Nataliya Kobina =

Uzbekistani sprinter

Personal information
- Nationality: Uzbekistani
- Born: 30 August 1979 (age 46)

Sport
- Sport: Sprinting
- Event: 4 × 400 metres relay

Nataliya Kobina (born 30 August 1979) is an Uzbekistani sprinter. She competed in the women's 4 × 400 metres relay at the 2000 Summer Olympics.
