= Athletics at the 1999 Pan American Games – Women's 4 × 400 metres relay =

Women's 4 × 400 metres relay at the Pan American Games

The women's 4 × 400 metres relay event at the 1999 Pan American Games was held on July 30.

== Results ==
Rank	Nation	Athletes	Time	Notes
1st place, gold medalist(s)	Cuba	Julia Duporty, Zulia Calatayud, Idalmis Bonne, Daimí Pernía	3:26.70	
2nd place, silver medalist(s)	United States	Shanelle Porter, Yulanda Nelson, Michelle Collins, Andrea Anderson	3:27.50	
3rd place, bronze medalist(s)	Barbados	Joanne Durant, Andrea Blackett, Melissa Straker, Tanya Oxley	3:30.72	NR
4	Jamaica	Claudine Williams, Charmaine Howell, Keisha Downer, Allison Beckford	3:30.76	
5	Canada	Karlene Haughton, LaDonna Antoine, Candice Jones, Foy Williams	3:31.85	
6	Colombia	Norma González, Mirtha Brock, Patricia Rodríguez, Norfalia Carabalí	3:32.87	
7	Mexico	Ángeles Pantoja, Mayra González, Marcela Sarabia, Ana Guevara	3:35.86	
	Ecuador		DNS	
