= Tatjana Lojanica =

Serbian sprinter

Personal information
- Nationality: Serbian
- Born: 19 January 1981 (age 44)

Sport
- Sport: Sprinting
- Event: 4 × 400 metres relay

Tatjana Lojanica (born 19 January 1981) is a Serbian sprinter. She competed in the women's 4 × 400 metres relay at the 2000 Summer Olympics, representing Yugoslavia.
