= Awmima Mohamed =

Sudanese sprinter

Personal information
- Nationality: Sudanese
- Born: 5 January 1985 (age 40)

Sport
- Sport: Sprinting
- Event: 400 metres

Awmima Mohamed (born 5 January 1985) is a Sudanese sprinter. She competed in the women's 400 metres at the 2000 Summer Olympics. She was the first woman to represent Sudan at the Olympics.
