= Kristina Perica =

Croatian sprinter

Personal information
- Born: 5 November 1979 (age 47) Zagreb, Croatia
- Height: 174 cm (5 ft 9 in)
- Weight: 59 kg (130 lb)

Sport
- Country: Croatia
- Sport: Sprinting
- Event: 400 metres

Kristina Perica (born 5 November 1979) is a Croatian sprinter. She competed in the women's 400 metres at the 2000 Summer Olympics.
