= 2001 IAAF World Indoor Championships – Women's 400 metres =

The women's 400 metres event at the 2001 IAAF World Indoor Championships was held on March 9–11.

== Medalists ==
Gold	Silver	Bronze
Sandie Richards; Jamaica	Olga Kotlyarova; Russia	Olesya Zykina; Russia

== Results ==
=== Heats ===
First 2 of each heat (Q) and the next 4 fastest (q) qualified for the semifinals.

Rank	Heat	Name	Nationality	Time	Notes
1	1	Sandie Richards	Jamaica	52.11	Q
2	1	Olesya Zykina	Russia	52.48	Q
3	4	Shanta Ghosh	Germany	52.49	Q
4	4	Nadjina Kaltouma	Chad	52.53	Q, NR
5	2	Olga Kotlyarova	Russia	52.61	Q
5	3	Catherine Murphy	Great Britain	52.61	Q
7	3	Suziann Reid	United States	52.65	Q
8	2	Monique Hennagan	United States	52.99	Q
9	3	Ionela Târlea	Romania	53.05	q
10	1	Natalya Sologub	Belarus	53.10	q
11	1	Aliann Pompey	Guyana	53.32	q
12	1	Foy Williams	Canada	53.39	q
13	2	Chrysoula Goudenoudi	Greece	53.62	
14	2	Žana Minina	Lithuania	53.68	NR
15	3	Catherine Scott	Jamaica	53.82	
15	4	LaDonna Antoine	Canada	53.82	
15	4	Maria do Carmo Tavares	Portugal	53.82	
18	4	Karen Shinkins	Ireland	53.90	
	2	Damayanthi Dharsha	Sri Lanka	DNF	

=== Semifinals ===
First 3 of each semifinal (Q) qualified directly for the final.

Rank	Heat	Name	Nationality	Time	Notes
1	2	Olga Kotlyarova	Russia	51.63	Q
2	2	Suziann Reid	United States	51.84	Q, SB
3	2	Nadjina Kaltouma	Chad	51.92	Q, NR
4	2	Shanta Ghosh	Germany	51.93	
5	1	Sandie Richards	Jamaica	51.98	Q
6	1	Olesya Zykina	Russia	52.18	Q
7	1	Monique Hennagan	United States	52.43	Q
8	1	Catherine Murphy	Great Britain	52.45	
9	1	Ionela Târlea	Romania	52.87	
10	2	Aliann Pompey	Guyana	53.18	
11	2	Natalya Sologub	Belarus	53.60	
12	1	Foy Williams	Canada	53.61	

=== Final ===
Rank	Name	Nationality	Time	Notes
1st place, gold medalist(s)	Sandie Richards	Jamaica	51.04	
2nd place, silver medalist(s)	Olga Kotlyarova	Russia	51.56	
3rd place, bronze medalist(s)	Olesya Zykina	Russia	51.71	
4	Nadjina Kaltouma	Chad	52.49	
5	Monique Hennagan	United States	52.93	
6	Suziann Reid	United States	1:11.50	
