= Michèle Leservoisier =

French retired track and field athlete (born 1965)

Personal information
- Nationality: French
- Born: September 8, 1965

Sport
- Sport: Athletics
- Event: distance running

Achievements and titles
- Personal best: Marathon: 2:38:11 (2001)
Medal record
Women's athletics
Representing France
Francophone Games
| Gold medal – first place | 2001 Ottawa | Marathon |

Michèle Leservoisier (8 September 1965) is a French retired track and field athlete who competed in long-distance running events. She won the marathon at the 2001 Francophone Games in 2:44:00, a Francophone Games record.

== Statistics ==
=== Personal bests ===
- 10 kilometres: 35:33, Lille, France, 1 September 2001
- 10 miles (road): 1:00:02, Rosny-sous-Bois, France, 7 October 2001
- Half marathon: 1:15:58, La Grande Motte, France, 3 March 2002
- Marathon: 2:38:11, Paris, France, 8 April 2001
- 100 kilometres: 8:45:00, Saint Augustin-des-Bois, France, 15 June 2003

=== International competitions ===
Representing France
| Year | Competition | Venue | Position | Event | Notes |
|---|---|---|---|---|---|
| 2011 | Francophone Games | Ottawa, Canada | 1st | Marathon | 2:44:00 |
