= Nataliya Senkina =

Uzbekistani sprinter

Personal information
- Nationality: Uzbekistani
- Born: 23 September 1970 (age 55)

Sport
- Sport: Sprinting
- Event: 4 × 400 metres relay

Nataliya Senkina (born 23 September 1970) is an Uzbekistani sprinter. She competed in the women's 4 × 400 metres relay at the 2000 Summer Olympics.
