= Fatma Lanouar =

Tunisian middle-distance runner

Fatma Lanouar (Arabic: فاطمة لأنور; born March 14, 1978) is a former female middle-distance runner from Tunisia. She is best known for twice (2001 and 2005) winning the gold medal at the Mediterranean Games in the women's 1500 metres. Lanouar set her personal best (4:06.91) in the 1,500 metres in 2000. She was also the silver medallist at the 2001 Jeux de la Francophonie.

== Competition record ==
Year	Competition	Venue	Position	Event	Notes
Representing Tunisia
1997	African Junior Championships	Ibadan, Nigeria	5th	1500 metres	4:25.35
1999	All-Africa Games	Johannesburg, South Africa	14th (h)	800 metres	2:09.78
1999	All-Africa Games	Johannesburg, South Africa	12th	1500 metres	4:43.11
2000	Olympic Games	Sydney, Australia	26th (h)	1500 metres	4:11.87
2001	World Indoor Championships	Lisbon, Portugal	15th (h)	1500 metres	4:16.42 (iNR)
2001	Jeux de la Francophonie	Ottawa, Canada	8th (h)	800 metres	2:05.39
2001	Jeux de la Francophonie	Ottawa, Canada	2nd	1500 metres	4:17.95
2001	Mediterranean Games	Tunis, Tunisia	6th	800 metres	2:08.28
2001	Mediterranean Games	Tunis, Tunisia	1st	1500 metres	4:10.33
2001	Mediterranean Games	Tunis, Tunisia	6th	4x400 m relay	3:47.10
2003	World Indoor Championships	Birmingham, United Kingdom	23rd (h)	1500 metres	4:18.45
2005	Mediterranean Games	Almería, Spain	1st	1500 metres	4:10.77
2006	African Championships	Bambous, Mauritius	9th	1500 metres	4:34.30
2007	All-Africa Games	Algiers, Algeria	8th	1500 metres	4:14.39
