= Maritza Figueroa =

Nicaraguan sprinter

Personal information
- Nationality: Nicaraguan
- Born: 8 March 1976 (age 50) Managua, Nicaragua

Sport
- Sport: Sprinting
- Event: 400 metres
Medal record
Representing Nicaragua
Central American Games
Bronze medal – third place	2001 Guatemala City	200m

Maritza de los Ángeles Figueroa Amador (born 8 March 1976) is a Nicaraguan sprinter. She competed in the women's 400 metres at the 2000 Summer Olympics.
