= Rosemary Okafor =

Nigerian sprinter

Personal information
- Nationality: Nigerian
- Born: 22 May 1981 (age 45)

Sport
- Sport: Sprinting
- Event: 4 × 400 metres relay
Medal record
Women's athletics
Representing Nigeria
African Championships
Gold medal – first place	1998 Dakar	4×400 m

Rosemary Nkemjika Okafor (born 22 May 1981) is a Nigerian sprinter. She competed in the women's 4 × 400 metres relay at the 2000 Summer Olympics.
