= Haissa Ali Garba =

Nigerien sprinter (born 1981)

Personal information
- Nationality: Nigerien
- Born: 15 December 1981 (age 43)

Sport
- Sport: Sprinting
- Event: 400 metres

Haissa Ali Garba (born 15 December 1981) is a Nigerien sprinter. She competed in the women's 400 metres at the 2000 Summer Olympics.
