= Athletics at the 1999 Pan American Games – Women's 400 metres =

Women's 400 metres at the Pan American Games

The women's 400 metres event at the 1999 Pan American Games was held July 24–25.

== Medalists ==
Gold	Silver	Bronze
Ana Guevara; Mexico	Michelle Collins; United States	Claudine Williams; Jamaica

== Results ==
=== Heats ===
Qualification: First 2 of each heat (Q) and the next 2 fastest (q) qualified for the final.

Rank	Heat	Name	Nationality	Time	Notes
1	2	Ana Guevara	Mexico	51.23	Q
2	3	Michelle Collins	United States	51.42	Q
3	2	Claudine Williams	Jamaica	51.88	Q
4	2	Aliann Pompey	Guyana	52.65	q
5	3	Norfalia Carabalí	Colombia	52.73	Q
6	1	Andrea Anderson	United States	52.83	Q
7	2	Foy Williams	Canada	52.95	q
7	3	Tonique Williams	Bahamas	52.95	
9	1	Melissa Straker	Barbados	52.96	Q
10	3	Verneta Lesforis	Saint Lucia	53.07	
11	3	Idalmis Bonne	Cuba	53.09	
12	1	LaDonna Antoine	Canada	53.10	
13	3	Zoila Stewart	Costa Rica	55.37	
	1	Tracey Barnes	Jamaica	DNS	
	2	Hazel-Ann Regis	Grenada	DNS	

=== Final ===
Rank	Name	Nationality	Time	Notes
1st place, gold medalist(s)	Ana Guevara	Mexico	50.91	
2nd place, silver medalist(s)	Michelle Collins	United States	51.21	
3rd place, bronze medalist(s)	Claudine Williams	Jamaica	51.58	
4	Andrea Anderson	United States	52.43	
5	Melissa Straker	Barbados	52.90	
6	Norfalia Carabalí	Colombia	53.06	
7	Foy Williams	Canada	53.65	
	Aliann Pompey	Guyana	DNF	
