= Lilian Bwalya =

Zambian sprinter (born 1974)

Personal information
- Nationality: Zambian
- Born: 28 December 1974 (age 50)

Sport
- Sport: Sprinting
- Event: 400 metres

Lilian Bwalya (born 28 December 1974) is a Zambian sprinter. She competed in the women's 400 metres at the 2000 Summer Olympics.
