= Yelena Budnik =

Belarusian sprinter

Personal information
- Nationality: Belarusian
- Born: 9 May 1976 (age 49)

Sport
- Sport: Sprinting
- Event: 4 × 400 metres relay

Yelena Budnik (born 9 May 1976) is a Belarusian sprinter. She competed in the women's 4 × 400 metres relay at the 2000 Summer Olympics.
