= Dijana Kojić =

Bosnia and Herzegovina athlete

Personal information
- Nationality: Bosnian
- Born: 26 July 1982 (age 43)

Sport
- Sport: Sprinting
- Event: 400 metres

Dijana Kojić (born 26 July 1982) is a retired Bosnian sprinter. She competed in the women's 400 metres at the 2000 Summer Olympics.
