= Patricia Buval =

French hurdler

Medal record

Athletics

Representing Martinique

CARIFTA Games Youth (U17)
Silver medal – second place	1991 Port of Spain	100m
Bronze medal – third place	1992 Nassau	100m

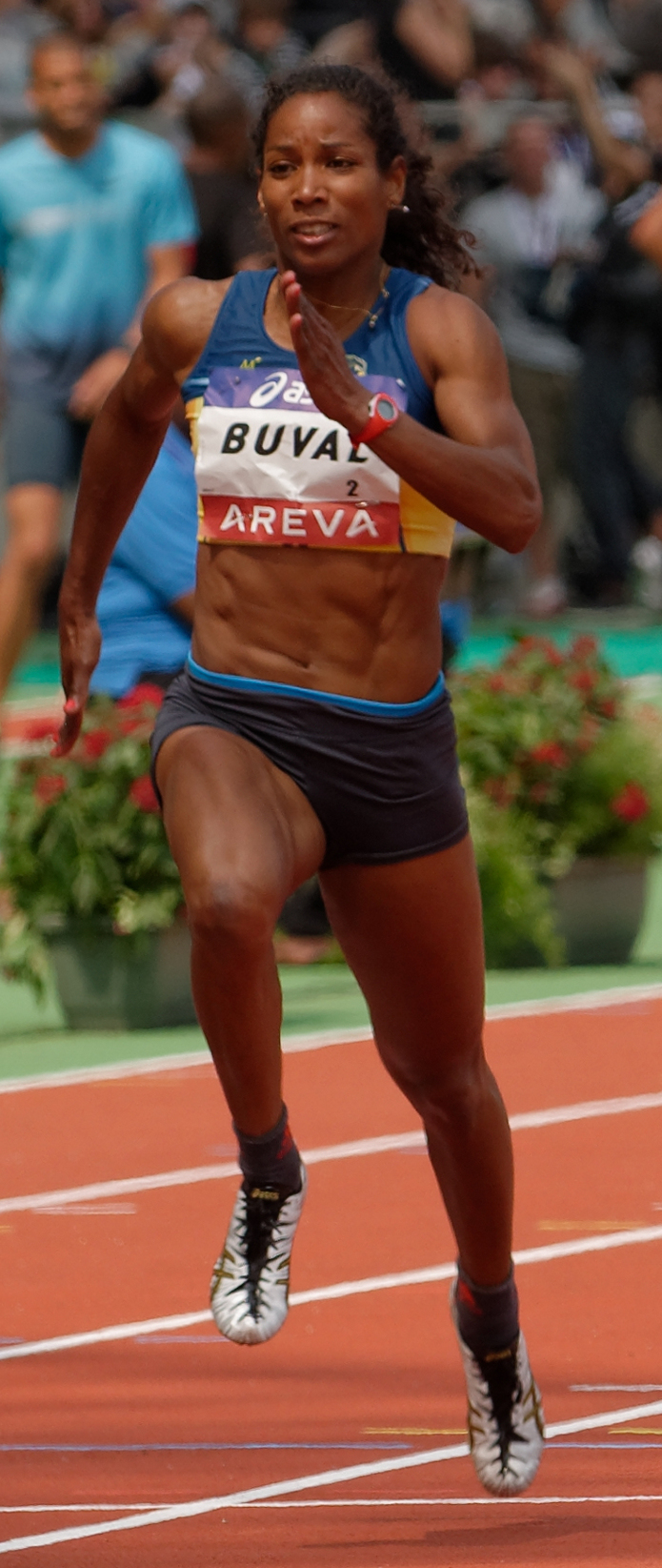
Patricia Buval at French Athletics Championships 2013

Patricia Buval (born 22 January 1976 in Fort de France, Martinique) is a French athlete who specializes in the 100 metres hurdles.

She hails from Martinique, which she represented at the CARIFTA Games as a youth. As a senior, she won the silver medal in the hurdles at the 2001 Jeux de la Francophonie. In the 4 x 100 metres relay she finished fourth at the 2005 World Championships.

Her personal best times are 8.19 seconds in the 60 metres hurdles (indoor), achieved in February 2002 in Liévin; and 13.02 in the 100 metres hurdles, achieved at the 2001 Jeux de la Francophonie in Ottawa. She also has 7.39 seconds in the 60 metres (indoor), achieved in February 2010 in Paris; and 11.33 seconds in the 100 metres, achieved in July 2005 in Angers.
