= Rich Duncan =

American football coach (born c. 1968)

Biographical details
- Born: c. 1968 (age 57–58); Wheeling, West Virginia, U.S.
- Education: Bethany College (1990); Loras College (2006)

Playing career

Football
- 1986–1989: Bethany (WV)

Baseball
- 1990: Bethany (WV)

Coaching career (HC unless noted)

Football
- 1991: Manchester (OL)
- 1992–1994: UMass Lowell (OL)
- 1995–1996: Capital (ST/OL)
- 1997–1998: Wisconsin–Platteville (OC/OL)
- 1999–2000: Wisconsin–Platteville (DC/DB)
- 2001–2004: Loras (OC/OL)
- 2005–2011: Aurora
- 2012–2020: Berry (OC/OL)
- 2021–2026: Rhodes

Baseball
- 1991: Manchester (assistant)
- 1998–2000: Wisconsin–Platteville

Administrative career (AD unless noted)
- 1995–1996: Capital (assistant AD)

Head coaching record
- Overall: 56–65 (football); 36–71 (baseball)
- Tournaments: Football; 0–1 (NCAA D-III playoffs)

Accomplishments and honors

Championships
- Football; 1 NAC (2008)

Rich Duncan (born c. 1968) is an American college football coach. He was most recently the head football coach for Rhodes College, a position he held from 2021 to 2026. He was the head football coach for Aurora University from 2005 to 2011. He was the head baseball coach for the University of Wisconsin–Platteville from 1998 to 2000. He also coached for Manchester, UMass Lowell, Capital, Loras, and Berry. He played college football and baseball for Bethany (WV).

== Head coaching record ==
=== Football ===
Year	Team	Overall	Conference	Standing	Bowl/playoffs
Aurora Spartans (Illini–Badger Football Conference) (2005–2007)
2005	Aurora	5–5	5–2	3rd	
2006	Aurora	5–5	5–2	T–2nd	
2007	Aurora	5–5	4–3	T–3rd	
Aurora Spartans (Northern Athletics Conference) (2008–2011)
2008	Aurora	9–2	7–0	1st	L NCAA Division III First Round
2009	Aurora	4–6	2–5	6th	
2010	Aurora	7–3	5–2	3rd	
2011	Aurora	3–7	2–5	6th	
Aurora:		38–33	30–19		
Rhodes Lynx (Southern Athletic Association) (2021–present)
2021	Rhodes	3–7	2–5	T–5th	
2022	Rhodes	5–5	3–4	5th	
2023	Rhodes	6–4	4–4	4th	
2024	Rhodes	3–7	2–5	T–5th	
2025	Rhodes	1–9	0–7	8th	
2026	Rhodes	0–7	0–0		
Rhodes:		18–32	11–25		
Total:		56–72			
National championship Conference title Conference division title or championship game berth

=== Baseball ===
Record table
Season	Team	Overall	Conference	Standing	Postseason
Wisconsin–Platteville Pioneers (Wisconsin Intercollegiate Athletic Conference) (1998–2000)
1998	Wisconsin–Platteville	13–19	5–9		
1999	Wisconsin–Platteville	10–29	5–9		
2000	Wisconsin–Platteville	13–23	4–10		
Wisconsin–Platteville:		36–71 (.336)	14–28 (.333)		
Total:		36–71 (.336)			
