= Alex Menal =

French sprinter

Personal information
- Born: 9 August 1972 (age 53) Pointe-à-Pitre, Guadeloupe
- Height: 175 cm (5 ft 9 in)
- Weight: 76 kg (168 lb)

Sport
- Country: France
- Sport: Athletics
- Event(s): 60 m, 100 m, 200 m

Alex Menal (born 9 August 1972) is a French athlete who specialises in the 100, 200 and 60 meters. Menal competed at the 1997 IAAF World Indoor Championships in Paris.
