= Gerald Clervil =

Haitian sprinter

Gerald Clervil (born 25 April 1976) is a Haitian former track and field athlete who competed in the men's 400m event at the 2000 Summer Olympics. He recorded 46.69 seconds, placing him eighth in his heat. His personal best is 45.71 seconds, raced in 1999.

Clervil competed for the Florida Gators track and field team in the NCAA.
