= Foy Williams =

Canadian sprinter

Personal information
- Nationality: Canadian
- Born: 27 September 1973 (age 53) Kingston, Jamaica
- Height: 1.70 m (5 ft 7 in)
- Weight: 59 kg (130 lb)

Sport
- Sport: Athletics
- Event: 400 m
- Club: Gladstone Athletics
Medal record
Representing Canada
Commonwealth Games
Bronze medal – third place	1998 Kuala Lumpur	4x400m relay

Foy Williams (born 27 September 1973 in Kingston, Jamaica) is a Canadian retired sprinter who specialised in the 400 metres. She represented Canada at the 2000 Summer Olympics, as well as two outdoor and one indoor World Championships.

== Competition record ==
Year	Competition	Venue	Position	Event	Notes
Representing Canada
1997	Universiade	Catania, Italy	6th	400 m	53.13
1997	Universiade	Catania, Italy	4th	4 × 400 m	3:31.94
1998	Commonwealth Games	Kuala Lumpur, Malaysia	8th (sf)	400 m	52.35
1998	Commonwealth Games	Kuala Lumpur, Malaysia	3rd	4 × 400 m	3:29.97
1999	Pan American Games	Winnipeg, Canada	7th	400 m	53.65
1999	Pan American Games	Winnipeg, Canada	5th	4 × 400 m	3:31.85
1999	World Championships	Seville, Spain	32nd (qf)	400 m	54.34
1999	World Championships	Seville, Spain	9th (h)	4 × 400 m	3:28.47
2000	Olympic Games	Sydney, Australia	28th (qf)	400 m	52.68
2000	Olympic Games	Sydney, Australia	12th (h)	4 × 400 m	3:27.36
2001	World Indoor Championships	Lisbon, Portugal	12th (sf)	400 m	53.61
2001	Jeux de la Francophonie	Ottawa, Canada	5th	400 m	52.40
2001	World Championships	Edmonton, Alberta	31st (h)	400 m	52.92
2001	World Championships	Edmonton, Alberta	8th	4 × 400 m	3:27.93
2002	Commonwealth Games	Manchester, United Kingdom	14th (sf)	400 m	53.21
2002	Commonwealth Games	Manchester, United Kingdom	5th	4 × 400 m	3:32.24

== Personal bests ==
Outdoor

- 200 metres – 23.44 (+0.3 m/s) (Ottawa 2001)
- 400 metres – 51.62 (Flagstaff 2000)

Indoor

- 400 metres – 53.39 (Lisbon 2001)
