= Yelena Piskunova =

Uzbekistani sprinter (born 1980)

Personal information
- Nationality: Uzbekistani
- Born: 2 August 1980 (age 45) Samarkand, Uzbek SSR, Soviet Union

Sport
- Sport: Sprinting
- Event: 400 metres

Yelena Vitalievna Piskunova (born 2 August 1980) is an Uzbekistani sprinter. She competed in the women's 400 metres at the 2000 Summer Olympics.

== Biography ==
Yelena Piskunova was born in the city of Samarkand, Uzbek SSR, on August 2, 1980. In 1999, at the Asian Junior Athletics Championships, she won silver in the 400 meters with a score of 54.43.
