= Victoria Day (athlete) =

British sprinter (born 1972)

Personal information
- Nationality: English
- Born: 19 June 1972 (age 54)

Sport
- Sport: Athletics
Medal record
Athletics
Representing England
Commonwealth Games
Silver medal – second place	1998 Kuala Lumpur	4x400m relay

Victoria Day (born 1972) is a female former international athlete who competed for England.

== Athletics career ==
She represented England and won a silver medal in the 4 x 400 metres relay event, at the 1998 Commonwealth Games in Kuala Lumpur, Malaysia. The other team members consisted of Donna Fraser, Michelle Pierre and Michelle Thomas.
