= Abdelhadi Habassa =

Moroccan long-distance runner

Personal information
- Native name: عبد الهادي حبصة
- Nationality: Morocco
- Born: 13 January 1976 (age 50)

Sport
- Sport: Athletics
- Event: Long-distance running

Achievements and titles
- Personal bests: 10,000 m – 28:16.28 (Ottawa, 2001); Half marathon – 1:01:21 (Safi, 2003)

Abdelhadi Habassa (born 13 January 1976) is a Moroccan long-distance runner.

He finished eighteenth at the 2001 World Half Marathon Championships.

His personal best time in the 10,000 metres was 28:16.28 minutes, achieved in July 2001 in Ottawa. His personal best time in the half marathon was 1:01:21 hours, achieved in April 2003 in Safi.

In 2008 Habassa was found guilty of norandrosterone doping. The sample was delivered on 3 February 2008 in an in-competition test in Valladolid, Spain. He received an IAAF suspension from May 2008 to May 2010.
