= Michelle Thomas (athlete) =

English sprinter

Personal information
- Nationality: British/Jamaican
- Born: 16 October 1971 (age 55) Saint Catherine Parish, Jamaica
- Height: 178 cm (5 ft 10 in)

Sport
- Sport: Athletics
- Event: 400m
- Club: Birchfield Harriers
- Coached by: Linford Christie

Achievements and titles
- World finals: World Masters W45 60m Dageu 2017 Toruń
Medal record
Athletics
Representing England
Commonwealth Games
Silver medal – second place	1998 Kuala Lumpur	4x400m relay
Representing Great Britain
European Championships
Bronze medal – third place	1998 Budapest	4x400m relay
Summer Universiade
Bronze medal – third place	1997 Catania	4x400m relay

Michelle Gabrielle Thomas (born 16 October 1971), is a Jamaican born female international athlete who competed for England.

== Biography ==
Thomas finished third behind Allison Curbishley in the 400 metres event at the 1998 AAA Championships.

Thomas represented England and won a silver medal in the 4 x 400 metres relay event, at the 1998 Commonwealth Games in Kuala Lumpur, Malaysia. The other team members consisted of Donna Fraser, Michelle Pierre and Victoria Day.

In 1999 Thomas once again finished third in the 400 metres AAAs, this time behind Katharine Merry at the 1999 AAA Championships.
