= Michelle Pierre =

Personal information
- Nationality: English
- Born: 30 September 1973 (age 53) London, England

Sport
- Sport: Athletics
- Club: Shaftesbury Barnet Harriers
Medal record
Athletics
Representing England
Commonwealth Games
Silver medal – second place	1998 Kuala Lumpur	4x400m relay
Representing Great Britain
Summer Universiade
Bronze medal – third place	1997 Catania	4x400m relay

Michelle Pierre (born 30 September 1973), is a female former international athlete who competed for England.

== Athletics career ==
She represented England and won a silver medal in the 4 x 400 metres relay event, at the 1998 Commonwealth Games in Kuala Lumpur, Malaysia. The other team members consisted of Donna Fraser, Victoria Day and Michelle Thomas.

She also represented Great Britain at the 1997 World Athletics Championships in Athens, Greece reaching the final in the 4 x 400 metres relay event and placing 6th. The other team members consisted of Alison Curbishley, Donna Fraser and Michelle Thomas.
