= Venolyn Clarke =

Canadian sprinter (born 1967)

Personal information
- Born: 11 July 1967 (age 58) Jamaica
- Occupation(s): Sprinter, teacher, coach

Sport
- Country: Canada
- Event: Sprinter
Medal record
Women's athletics
Representing Canada
Francophone Games
Silver medal – second place	2001 Ottawa	100 m
Gold medal – first place	2001 Ottawa	4x100 m relay
Canadian Senior Championship
Gold medal – first place	2001	100 m

Venolyn "Miss Clarke" Clarke (born Venolyn Clarke; 11 July 1967, in Jamaica) is a former sprinter who specialized in the 100 metres. In 2001, Clarke held the position of the fourth fastest woman in Canada. Clarke's personal best time was 1:11.29 seconds, achieved in July 2001 in Ottawa, Ontario.

== Sprinting career ==
Clarke reached the quarter-final at the 2001 World Championships, but got disqualified due to a failed drugs test.

It was later revealed that at a World Championships pre-camp, Clarke had tested positive for stanozolol. In an interview, she cried and repeatedly denied that she used any stanozolol. Clarke's coach, Clive Foster, also denied that Clarke used any stanozolol. Clarke was the first athlete to fail a drugs test at the 2001 World Championships. This caused Clake to get expelled from the world championships. Later, the Canadian Centre for Ethics in Sport allowed her to compete again.
