= Peggy Babin =

French athlete

Personal information
- Nationality: France
- Born: 24 December 1976 (age 48)

Sport
- Sport: Running
- Event: Sprints

Peggy Babin (born 24 December 1976) is a retired French athlete who specialized in the 400 metres and 800 metres.

She won the bronze medal at the 2001 Jeux de la Francophonie, and competed without reaching the final at the 2001 World Championships and the 2002 European Indoor Championships. In the 4 x 400 metres relay she finished fifth at the 2002 European Championships.

Her personal best times are 52.83 seconds in the 400 metres, achieved in July 2002 in Paris; and 2:01.66 minutes in the 800 metres, achieved in July 2001 in Ottawa.
