= Anita Mormand =

French sprinter

Anita Mormand (born 20 February 1971 in Pointe-a-Pitre, Guadeloupe) is a retired French sprinter who specialized in the 200 metres.

She won the silver medal at the 1997 Jeux de la Francophonie, and the bronze medal at the 2001 Mediterranean Games.

In the 4 x 400 metres relay she finished sixth at the 1998 European Championships and seventh at the 2006 European Championships. She also competed at the 2003 World Championships.

Her personal best times are 11.43 seconds in the 100 metres, achieved in August 1999 in Nivelles; 23.44 seconds in the 200 metres, achieved in August 2000 in Nantes; and 51.94 seconds in the 400 metres.
