= Khalid Tighazouine =

Moroccan middle-distance runner

Personal information
- Born: 18 June 1977 (age 49) Ouarzazate, Morocco

Sport
- Sport: Track and field
Medal record
Representing Morocco
Summer Universiade
Gold medal – first place	2001 Beijing	800m
Mediterranean Games
Silver medal – second place	2001 Tunis	800m

Khalid Tighazouine (born 18 June 1977) is a Moroccan middle distance runner who specializes in the 800 metres.

His personal best time over the distance is 1:45.27 minutes, achieved in September 2001 in Beijing.

In July 2004 Tighazouine tested positive for the drug nandrolone, and received a suspension from the IAAF which lasted until July 2006.

== Achievements ==
Year	Competition	Venue	Position	Notes
Representing Morocco
2001	World Championships	Edmonton, Canada	7th	800 m
2001	Mediterranean Games	Radès, Tunisia	2nd	800 m
2001	Jeux de la Francophonie	Ottawa, Canada	1st	800 m
2001	Summer Universiade	Beijing, PR China	1st	800 m
2002	African Championships	Radès, Tunisia	5th	800 m
