= Samantha George (sprinter) =

Canadian sprinter

Personal information
- Born: 7 August 1976 (age 49) Brampton, Ontario, Canada

Sport
- Sport: Sprinting
- Event: 4 × 400 metres relay

Samantha George (born 7 August 1976) is a Canadian sprinter. She competed in the women's 4 × 400 metres relay at the 2000 Summer Olympics.

George was an All-American for the Florida State Seminoles track and field team in the 400 m.
