= Claudine Komgang =

Cameroonian sprinter

Medal record

Women's athletics

Representing Cameroon

African Championships
Gold medal – first place	2000 Algiers	400 m
Gold medal – first place	2000 Algiers	4×400 m
Silver medal – second place	1996 Yaoundé	4×400 m
Bronze medal – third place	1998 Dakar	4×400 m
Bronze medal – third place	2000 Algiers	4×100 m

Claudine Komgang-Fotsing (born 21 April 1974) is a retired Cameroonian sprinter who specialized in the 400 metres.

She won the gold medal at the 2000 African Championships. She also competed at the 1999 World Championships and the 2000 Summer Olympics without reaching the final.

Her personal best time is 50.73 seconds, achieved in July 2000 in Mexico City.
