= 2001 Jeux de la Francophonie =

International sports competition in Canada

IVes Jeux de la Francophonie
- Host city: Ottawa, Ontario and Gatineau, Quebec, Canada
- Nations: 51
- Athletes: 2,400
- Opening: July 14, 2001
- Closing: July 24, 2001
- Opened by: Adrienne Clarkson
- Main venue: Frank Clair Stadium

The 2001 Jeux de la Francophonie, also known as IV^{es} Jeux de la Francophonie, (French for Francophone Games) were held in Ottawa, Ontario and Gatineau, Quebec, Canada from July 14–24, 2001.

== Events ==
=== Sports ===
Sport	Gender	Results
Athletics (Track and field) include disabled athletics	men + women	details
Basketball	women	details
Boxing	men	details
Football (soccer)	men	details
Judo	men + women	details
Table tennis	men + women	details
Beach volleyball	men + women	demonstration sport (details)

=== Cultural ===
Folk tale
Painting
Photography
Poetry
Sculpture
Song
Street art
Traditional inspiration dance

== Medal count ==
=== Medal table ===
* Host nation (Canada)

Rank	Nation	Gold	Silver	Bronze	Total
1	Romania (ROU)	14	7	5	26
2	France (FRA)	13	11	18	42
3	Canada (CAN)*	12	8	18	38
4	Poland (POL)	10	4	7	21
5	Morocco (MAR)	8	6	7	21
6	Egypt (EGY)	4	4	4	12
7	Mauritius (MRI)	4	3	2	9
8	(Quebec) Canada Québec (CQC)*	3	7	7	17
9	Tunisia (TUN)	2	3	4	9
10	Ivory Coast (CIV)	2	3	1	6
11	Madagascar (MAD)	1	4	3	8
12	Cameroon (CMR)	1	3	6	10
13	(Wallonia) French Community of Belgium (CFB)	1	2	2	5
14	Chad (CHA)	1	1	1	3
14	Haiti (HAI)	1	1	1	3
14	Senegal (SEN)	1	1	1	3
17	Bulgaria (BUL)	1	0	2	3
18	Benin (BEN)	1	0	1	2
18	Gabon (GAB)	1	0	1	2
20	Burkina Faso (BUR)	1	0	0	1
20	Cape Verde (CPV)	1	0	0	1
22	Lithuania (LTU)	0	5	6	11
23	Czech Republic (CZE)	0	3	3	6
24	Luxembourg (LUX)	0	2	2	4
25	Vietnam (VIE)	0	2	0	2
26	Canada New Brunswick (CNB)*	0	1	1	2
27	Congo (CGO)	0	1	0	1
27	DR Congo (COD)	0	1	0	1
27	Niger (NIG)	0	1	0	1
30	Lebanon (LIB)	0	0	3	3
31	Burundi (BDI)	0	0	2	2
31	Switzerland (SUI)	0	0	2	2
33	Cambodia (CAM)	0	0	1	1
33	Central African Republic (CAF)	0	0	1	1
33	Guinea (GUI)	0	0	1	1
33	Mali (MLI)	0	0	1	1
Totals (36 entries)		83	84	114	281
