= Athletics at the 2000 Summer Olympics – Women's 400 metres hurdles =

Women's 400 metres hurdles at the Games of the XXVII Olympiad
- Venue: Stadium Australia
- Date: 24 September 2000 (heats); 25 September 2000 (semi-finals); 27 September 2000 (final)
- Competitors: 33 from 21 nations
- Winning time: 53.02

Medalists
1st place, gold medalist(s)		Irina Privalova; Russia
2nd place, silver medalist(s)		Deon Hemmings; Jamaica
3rd place, bronze medalist(s)		Nezha Bidouane; Morocco

The Women's 400 metre Hurdles at the 2000 Summer Olympics as part of the athletics programme were held at Stadium Australia on Sunday 24 September, Monday 25 September and Wednesday 27 September 2000.

The top two runners in each of the initial five heats automatically qualified for the semifinals. The next six fastest runners from across the heats also qualified. Those 16 runners competed in 2 heats in the semifinals, with the top three runners from each heat qualifying for the finals. The next two fastest runners from across the heats also qualified.

== Records ==
World and Olympic records prior to the Games
World Record	52.61	Kim Batten	USA	Gothenburg, Sweden	11 August 1995
Olympic Record	52.82	Deon Hemmings	JAM	Atlanta, Georgia, United States	31 July 1996

== Medalists ==
Gold:	Silver:	Bronze:
Irina Privalova, Russia	Deon Hemmings, Jamaica	Nouzha Bidouane, Morocco

== Results ==
All times shown are in seconds.

- Q denotes qualification by place in heat.
- q denotes qualification by overall place.
- DNS denotes did not start.
- DNF denotes did not finish.
- DQ denotes disqualification.
- NR denotes national record.
- AR denotes area/continental record.
- OR denotes Olympic record.
- WR denotes world record.
- PB denotes personal best.
- SB denotes season best.

== Qualifying heats ==
=== Round 1 ===
Heat 1 of 5 Date: Sunday 24 September 2000
Place		Athlete	Nation	Lane	Reaction	Time	Qual.	Record
Heat	Overall	Athlete	Nation	Lane	Reaction	Time	Qual.	Record
1	1	Nouzha Bidouane	Morocco	4	0.162 s	55.38 s	Q	
2	12	Kim Batten	United States	6	0.162 s	56.28 s	Q	
3	14	Andrea Blackett	Barbados	2	0.174 s	56.31 s	q	
4	24	Sinead Dudgeon	Great Britain	5	0.201 s	57.82 s		
5	32	Mary-Estelle Kapalu	Vanuatu	3	0.437 s	1:02.68		
		Nataliya Chulkova	Russia	8	0.343 s	DNF		
		Karlene Haughton	Canada	7	DNS			

Heat 2 of 5 Date: Sunday 24 September 2000
Place		Athlete	Nation	Lane	Reaction	Time	Qual.	Record
Heat	Overall	Athlete	Nation	Lane	Reaction	Time	Qual.	Record
1	3	Daimí Pernía	Cuba	7	0.256 s	55.53 s	Q	
2	4	Heike Meissner	Germany	8	0.224 s	55.58 s	Q	
3	5	Natasha Danvers	Great Britain	3	0.160 s	55.68 s	q	
4	9	Yulia Nosova	Russia	6	0.293 s	56.11 s	q	
5	10	Catherine Scott-Pomales	Jamaica	5	0.187 s	56.17 s	q	
6	20	Tetiana Debela	Ukraine	4	0.164 s	57.33 s		
7	30	Cherry	Myanmar	2	0.218 s	1:00.81 s		

Heat 3 of 5 Date: Sunday 24 September 2000
Place		Athlete	Nation	Lane	Reaction	Time	Qual.	Record
Heat	Overall	Athlete	Nation	Lane	Reaction	Time	Qual.	Record
1	2	Deon Hemmings	Jamaica	6	0.219 s	55.44 s	Q	
2	11	Tetyana Tereshchuk-Antipova	Ukraine	2	0.329 s	56.27 s	Q	
3	17	Jana Pittman	Australia	4	0.196 s	56.76 s		
4	21	Anna Olichwierczuk	Poland	5	0.229 s	57.36 s		
5	25	Monika Niederstatter	Italy	3	0.268 s	58.02 s		
6	27	Tacko Diouf	Senegal	7	0.173 s	58.65 s		

Heat 4 of 5 Date: Sunday 24 September 2000
Place		Athlete	Nation	Lane	Reaction	Time	Qual.	Record
Heat	Overall	Athlete	Nation	Lane	Reaction	Time	Qual.	Record
1	6	Sandra Glover	United States	6	0.207 s	55.76 s	Q	
2	8	Ulrike Urbansky	Germany	8	0.297 s	55.93 s	Q	
3	15	Natalya Torshina	Kazakhstan	7	0.289 s	56.38 s	q	
4	19	Susan Smith-Walsh	Ireland	4	0.152 s	57.08 s		
5	23	Irēna Žauna	Latvia	3	0.229 s	57.79 s		
6	26	Lauren Poetschka	Australia	5	0.183 s	58.06 s		
7	31	Chrysoula Gountunoudi	Greece	2	0.223 s	1:01.59		

Heat 5 of 5 Date: Sunday 24 September 2000
Place		Athlete	Nation	Lane	Reaction	Time	Qual.	Record
Heat	Overall	Athlete	Nation	Lane	Reaction	Time	Qual.	Record
1	7	Irina Privalova	Russia	3	0.204 s	55.89 s	Q	
2	13	Guðrún Arnardóttir	Iceland	6	0.201 s	56.30 s	Q	
3	16	Ionela Târlea	Romania	2	0.246 s	56.40 s	q	
4	18	Tonja Buford-Bailey	United States	8	0.206 s	57.02 s		
5	22	Keri Maddox	Great Britain	4	0.220 s	57.44 s		
6	28	Stephanie Price	Australia	5		58.81 s		
7	29	Patrina Allen	Jamaica	7	0.328 s	59.36 s		

Overall

Round 1 Overall Results
Place	Athlete	Nation	Heat	Lane	Place	Time	Qual.	Record
1	Nouzha Bidouane	Morocco	1	4	1	55.38 s	Q	
2	Deon Hemmings	Jamaica	3	6	1	55.44 s	Q	
3	Daimí Pernía	Cuba	2	7	1	55.53 s	Q	
4	Heike Meissner	Germany	2	8	2	55.58 s	Q	
5	Natasha Danvers	Great Britain	2	3	3	55.68 s	q	
6	Sandra Glover	United States	4	6	1	55.76 s	Q	
7	Irina Privalova	Russia	5	3	1	55.89 s	Q	
8	Ulrike Urbansky	Germany	4	8	2	55.93 s	Q	
9	Yulia Nosova	Russia	2	6	4	56.11 s	q	
10	Catherine Scott-Pomales	Jamaica	2	5	5	56.17 s	q	
11	Tetyana Tereshchuk-Antipova	Ukraine	3	2	2	56.27 s	Q	
12	Kim Batten	United States	1	6	2	56.28 s	Q	
13	Guðrún Arnardóttir	Iceland	5	6	2	56.30 s	Q	
14	Andrea Blackett	Barbados	1	2	3	56.31 s	q	
15	Natalya Torshina	Kazakhstan	4	7	3	56.38 s	q	
16	Ionela Târlea	Romania	5	2	3	56.40 s	q	
17	Jana Pittman	Australia	3	4	3	56.76 s		
18	Tonja Buford-Bailey	United States	5	8	4	57.02 s		
19	Susan Smith-Walsh	Ireland	4	4	4	57.08 s		
20	Tetyana Debela	Ukraine	2	4	6	57.33 s		
21	Anna Olichwierczuk	Poland	3	5	4	57.36 s		
22	Keri Maddox	Great Britain	5	4	5	57.44 s		
23	Irena Zauna	Latvia	4	3	5	57.79 s		
24	Sinead Dudgeon	Great Britain	1	5	4	57.82 s		
25	Monika Niederstatter	Italy	3	3	5	58.02 s		
26	Lauren Poetschka	Australia	4	5	6	58.06 s		
27	Tacko Diouf	Senegal	3	7	6	58.65 s		
28	Stephanie Price	Australia	5	5	6	58.81 s		
29	Patrina Allen	Jamaica	5	7	7	59.36 s		
30	Cherry	Myanmar	2	2	7	1:00.81		
31	Chrysoula Gountunoudi	Greece	4	2	7	1:01.59 s		
32	Mary-Estelle Kapalu	Vanuatu	1	3	5	1:02.68		
	Natalia Chulkova	Russia	1	8		DNF		
	Karlene Haughton	Canada	1	8		DNS		

=== Semi-finals ===
Heat 1 of 2 Date: Monday 25 September 2000
Place		Athlete	Nation	Lane	Reaction	Time	Qual.	Record
Position	Overall	Athlete	Nation	Lane	Reaction	Time	Qual.	Record
1	1	Deon Hemmings	Jamaica	3	0.288 s	54.00 s	Q	SB
2	7	Daimí Pernía	Cuba	5	0.448 s	54.92 s	Q	
3	8	Natasha Danvers	Great Britain	8	0.156 s	54.95 s	Q	PB
4	10	Ulrike Urbansky	Germany	4	0.185 s	55.23 s		
5	12T	Heike Meissner	Germany	6	0.399 s	55.73 s		
6	12T	Kim Batten	United States	2	0.207 s	55.73 s		
7	15	Natalya Torshina	Kazakhstan	1	0.222 s	56.22 s		
8	16	Yulia Nosova	Russia	7		56.58 s		

Heat 2 of 2 Date: Monday 25 September 2000
Place		Athlete	Nation	Lane	Reaction	Time	Qual.	Record
Position	Overall	Athlete	Nation	Lane	Reaction	Time	Qual.	Record
1	2	Irina Privalova	Russia	5	0.203 s	54.02 s	Q	PB
2	3	Nouzha Bidouane	Morocco	3	0.190 s	54.19 s	Q	
3	4	Tetyana Tereshchuk-Antipova	Ukraine	6	0.394 s	54.25 s	Q	
4	5	Ionela Târlea	Romania	8	0.219 s	54.70 s	q	
5	6	Guðrún Arnardóttir	Iceland	7	0.171 s	54.82 s	q	SB
6	9	Sandra Glover	United States	4	0.473 s	54.98 s		
7	11	Andrea Blackett	Barbados	1	0.194 s	55.30 s		
8	14	Catherine Scott-Pomales	Jamaica	2	0.219 s	55.78 s		

Semi-finals- Overall

Semi-finals Overall results
Place	Athlete	Nation	Heat	Lane	Place	Time	Qual.	Record
1	Deon Hemmings	Jamaica	1	3	1	54.00 s	Q	SB
2	Irina Privalova	Russia	2	5	1	54.02 s	Q	PB
3	Nouzha Bidouane	Morocco	2	3	2	54.19 s	Q	
4	Tetyana Tereshchuk-Antipova	Ukraine	2	6	3	54.25 s	Q	
5	Ionela Târlea	Romania	2	8	4	54.70 s	q	SB
6	Guðrún Arnardóttir	Iceland	2	7	5	54.82 s	q	
7	Daimí Pernía	Cuba	1	5	2	54.92 s	Q	
8	Natasha Danvers	Great Britain	1	8	3	54.95 s	Q	PB
9	Sandra Glover	United States	2	4	6	54.98 s		
10	Ulrike Urbansky	Germany	1	4	4	55.30 s		
11	Andrea Blackett	Barbados	2	1	7	55.30 s		
12	Kim Batten	United States	1	2	6	55.73 s		
12	Heike Meissner	Germany	1	6	5	55.73 s		
14	Catherine Scott-Pomales	Jamaica	2	2	8	55.78 s		
15	Natalya Torshina	Kazakhstan	1	1	7	56.22 s		
16	Yulia Nosova	Russia	1	7	8	56.58 s		

== Final ==
Heat 1 of 1 Date: Wednesday 27 September 2000
Place	Athlete	Nation	Lane	Reaction	Time	Record
1st place, gold medalist(s)	Irina Privalova	Russia	3	0.178 s	53.02 s	PB
2nd place, silver medalist(s)	Deon Hemmings	Jamaica	6	0.446 s	53.45 s	SB
3rd place, bronze medalist(s)	Nouza Bidouane	Morocco	4	0.169 s	53.57 s	
4	Daimí Pernía	Cuba	5	0.447 s	53.68 s	SB
5	Tetyana Tereshchuk-Antipova	Ukraine	8	0.326 s	53.98 s	SB
6	Ionela Târlea	Romania	7	0.281 s	54.35 s	SB
7	Gudrun Arnardottir	Iceland	2	0.238 s	54.63 s	
8	Natasha Danvers	Great Britain	1	0.174 s	55.00 s	
