= 1999–2000 Australian Athletics Championships =

- Dates: 24–27 February 2000
- Host city: Sydney, Australia
- Venue: Stadium Australia
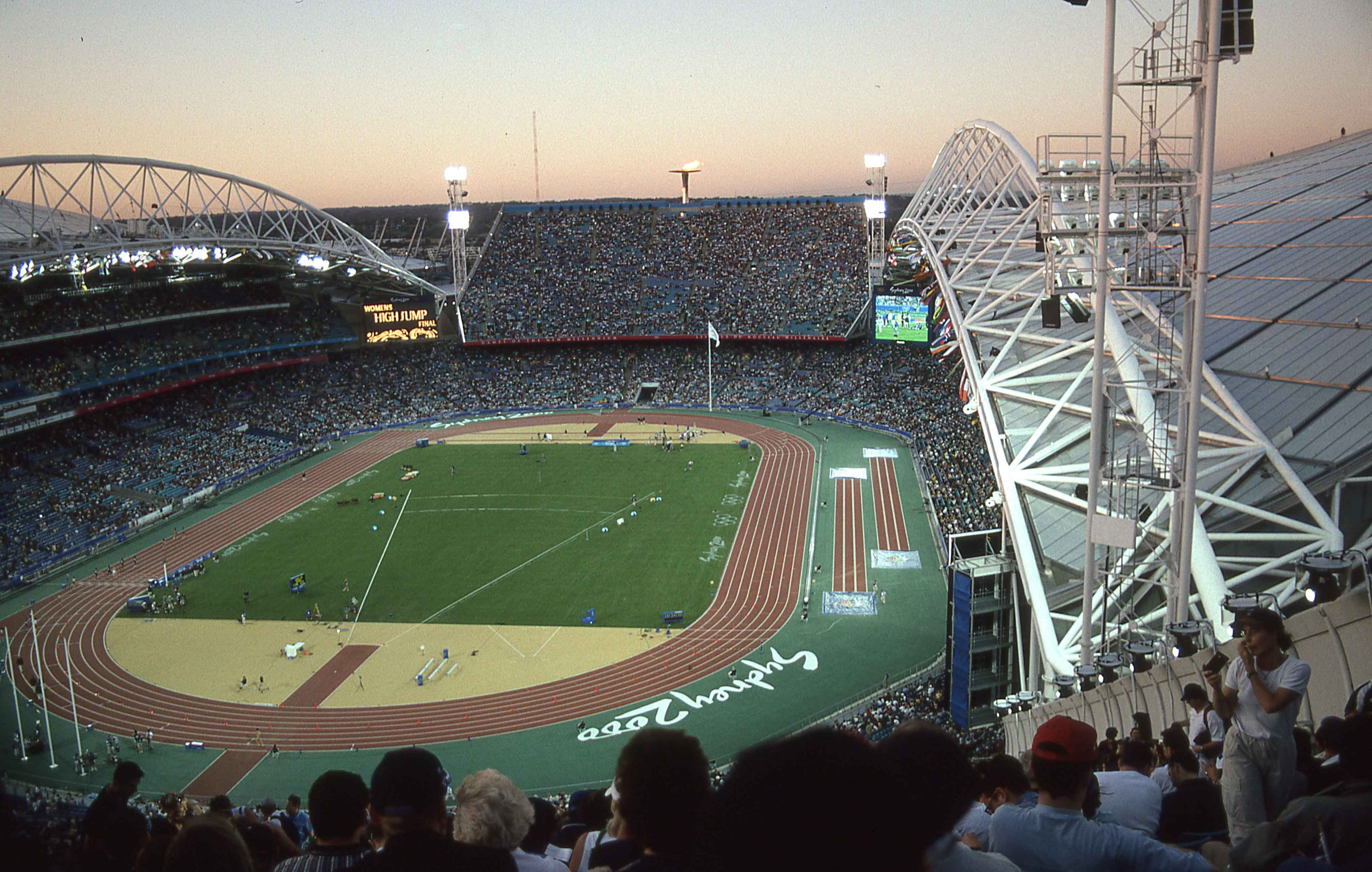

The 1999–2000 Australian Athletics Championships was the 78th edition of the national championship in outdoor track and field for Australia. It was held from 24 to 27 February 2000 at the Stadium Australia in Sydney. It served as a selection meeting for Australia at the 2000 Summer Olympics. The 10,000 metres events took place separately at the Melbourne Track Classic on 2 March 2000 in Melbourne.

The competition was also a preparation event for the athletics at the 2000 Summer Olympics, which were held at the same venue.

== Medal summary ==
=== Men ===
Event	Gold		Silver		Bronze	
100 metres (Wind: -0.3 m/s)	Matt Shirvington; New South Wales	10.26	Patrick Johnson; Australian Capital Territory	10.32	Damien Marsh; Queensland	10.40
200 metres (Wind: +0.4 m/s)	Darryl Wohlsen; Queensland	20.64	Chris Donaldson; New Zealand (NZL)	20.74	Antoine Boussombo; Gabon (GAB)	20.90
400 metres	Patrick Dwyer; New South Wales	45.21	Brad Jamieson; South Australia	46.40	Daniel Batman; New South Wales	46.71
800 metres	Djabir Saïd-Guerni; Algeria (ALG)	1:44.28	David Lelei; Kenya (KEN)	1:44.58	Kris McCarthy; Victoria	1:45.91
1500 metres	William Chirchir; Kenya (KEN)	3:38.51	John Kosgei; Kenya (KEN)	3:39.60	Nick Howarth; South Australia	3:40.19
5000 metres	Michael Power; Victoria	13:28.11	Sisay Bezabeh; Australian Capital Territory	13:33.23	Shaun Creighton; Australian Capital Territory	13:42.68
10,000 metres	Joseph Kimani; Kenya (KEN)	28:30.32	Emerson Iser Bem; Brazil (BRA)	28:51.17	Robbie Johnston; New Zealand (NZL)	28:54.54
110 metres hurdles (Wind: +1.5 m/s)	Tim Ewen; South Australia	13.87	Joseph-Berlioz Randriamihaja; Madagascar (MAD)	13.96	Yasunori Yoshioka; Japan (JPN)	14.13
400 metres hurdles	Rohan Robinson; Victoria	50.21	Zid Abou Hamed; New South Wales	50.45	Blair Young; Queensland	50.53
3000 metres steeplechase	Chris Unthank; Victoria	8:36.35	Stephen Thurston; South Australia	8:39.98	Martin Dent; Victoria	8:43.67
4 × 100 m relay	Malaysia (MAS); Kok Lim Tan; Nazmizan Mohamad; Azmi Ibrahim; Watson Nyambrk	40.31	Sydney Pacific; New South Wales (NSW); Tristan Conn; Nathan Anderson; Stephen Hatch; Clayton Jones	41.32	Hastings; New Zealand (NZL); Andrew Orme; Michael O'Connor; Simon Maunder; William Trew	41.99
4 × 400 m relay	Pacific Athletics; Queensland (QLD); David Cappellano; Anton Booth; Darryl Wohlsen; Blair Young	3:07.05	Sydney Pacific; New South Wales (NSW); Daniel Stolp; Robert Medlicott; Fraser Dowling; Jason Kougellis	3:08.91	Sutherland District; New South Wales (NSW); Matthew Masselos; Michael Crump; Jarret Titcombe; Paul Kelleher	3:16.71
High jump	Nick Moroney; New South Wales	2.22 m	Konstantin Matusevich; Israel (ISR)	2.22 m	Ronald Garlett; South Australia	2.18 m
Pole vault	Paul Burgess; Western Australia	5.50 m	Dmitri Markov; Western Australia	5.50 m	Danny Krasnov; Israel (ISR)	5.50 m
Long jump	Peter Burge; New South Wales	8.28 m (-0.4 m/s)	Jai Taurima; Queensland	8.09 m (+0.7 m/s)	Nabil Adamou; Victoria	7.73 m (+0.4 m/s)
Triple jump	Rogel Nachum; Israel (ISR)	16.80 m (+0.2 m/s)	Andrew Murphy; New South Wales	16.56 m (-1.0 m/s)	Onochie Achike; Great Britain (GBR)	16.28 m (+2.3 m/s)
Shot put	Justin Anlezark; Queensland	19.24 m	Clay Cross; New South Wales	18.33 m	John Minns; Victoria	17.61 m
Discus throw	Ian Winchester; New Zealand (NZL)	58.66 m	Chris Gaviglio; Queensland	55.52 m	Aaron Neighbour; Victoria	53.44 m
Hammer throw	Stuart Rendell; Australian Capital Territory	74.71 m	Wataru Ebihara; Japan (JPN)	65.08 m	Zsolt Németh; Hungary (HUN)	64.28 m
Javelin throw	Andrew Currey; New South Wales	81.81 m	Adrian Hatcher; New South Wales	80.03 m	Terry McHugh; Ireland (IRL)	76.13 m
Decathlon	Klaus Ambrosch; Austria (AUT)	7892 pts	Jagan Hames; South Australia	7720 pts	Matthew McEwen; Queensland	7631 pts

=== Women ===
Event	Gold		Silver		Bronze	
100 metres (Wind: -1.1 m/s)	Melinda Gainsford-Taylor; New South Wales	11.53	Jodi Lambert; Western Australia	11.72	Suzanne Broadrick; Victoria	11.74
200 metres (Wind: -2.3 m/s)	Cathy Freeman; Victoria	22.78	Melinda Gainsford-Taylor; New South Wales	22.80	Nova Peris-Kneebone; Northern Territory	23.51
400 metres	Cathy Freeman; Victoria	50.00	Ana Guevara; Mexico (MEX)	50.84	Lee Naylor; Victoria	51.37
800 metres	Tamsyn Lewis; Victoria	1:59.29	Toni Hodgkinson; New Zealand (NZL)	1:59.39	Susan Andrews; Western Australia	2:00.37
1500 metres	Naomi Mugo; Kenya (KEN)	4:10.27	Georgie Clarke; Victoria	4:10.59	Sarah Jamieson; Victoria	4:10.61
5000 metres	Anne Cross; Victoria	15:36.15	Clair Fearnley; Victoria	15:36.92	Breda Dennehy-Willis; Ireland (IRL)	15:44.03
10,000 metres	Sonia O'Sullivan; Ireland (IRL)	31:43.07	Clair Fearnley; Victoria	31:55.65	Kylie Risk; Tasmania	32:25.21
100 metres hurdles (Wind: -0.3 m/s)	Valerie Manning; United States (USA)	13.35	Mame Tacko Diouf; Senegal (SEN)	13.35	Sally Bult; Western Australia	13.50
400 metres hurdles	Lauren Poetschka; Western Australia	56.03	Stephanie Price; New South Wales	56.67	Mame Tacko Diouf; Senegal (SEN)	57.30
3000 metres steeplechase	Melissa Rollinson; Queensland	10:10.73	Leah Rogers; Victoria	10:16.01	Karen Murphy; New Zealand (NZL)	10:21.48
4 × 100 m relay	Ryde; New South Wales (NSW); Merryn Aldridge; Rachael Massey; Vicki Piggin; Amy Winters	46.73	University of Queensland; Queensland (QLD); Melanie Kleeberg; Melissa Moss; Amy Harris; Katrina Sendall	47.41	University of Melbourne; Victoria (VIC); Cindy Gabbey; Brigitte Egan; Kelly Roberts; Rebecca O'Loughlin	47.92
4 × 400 m relay	Bankstown Sports; New South Wales (NSW); Lauren Poetschka; Robyn Winn; Kate Huxtable; Amber Menzies	3:45.37	University of Queensland; Queensland (QLD); Katrina Sendall; Caitlin Willis; Rebecca Sadler; Kristy Hodge	3:48.99	Sutherland; New South Wales (NSW); Kylie Watkins; Lauren Pearson; Belinda Sanders; S. Warncken	3:53.45
High jump	Alison Inverarity; Western Australia	1.85	Lisa Bruty; Victoria	1.82	Karen Dickson; Western Australia	1.82
Pole vault	Emma George; Western Australia	4.40 m	Alejandra García; Argentina (ARG)	4.20 m	Bridgid Isworth; Victoria	4.10 m
Long jump	Kylie Reed; Western Australia	6.57 m (-1.8 m/s)	Bronwyn Thompson; Queensland	6.33 m (+0.2 m/s)	Sharon Sutherland; Western Australia	6.15 m (-0.8 m/s)
Triple jump	Nicole Mladenis; Western Australia	13.59 m (-0.0 m/s)	Connie Henry; Great Britain (GBR)	13.45 m (-0.4 m/s)	Mariklud Viduka; New South Wales	13.05 m (-0.4 m/s)
Shot put	Helen Toussis; Queensland	15.55 m	Sumi Ichioka; Japan (JPN)	15.25 m	Tania Lutton-Senior; New Zealand (NZL)	15.12 m
Discus throw	Alison Lever; Queensland	63.73 m	Lisa-Marie Vizaniari; Queensland	62.71 m	Beatrice Faumuina; New Zealand (NZL)	62.68 m
Hammer throw	Lisa Misipeka; American Samoa (ASA)	63.90 m	Tasha Williams; New Zealand (NZL)	63.34 m	Bronwyn Eagles; New South Wales	62.77 m
Javelin throw	Sueli dos Santos; Brazil (BRA)	54.92 m	Bina Ramesh; France (FRA)	50.61 m	Stephanie Hancock; Queensland	49.58 m
Heptathlon	Sherryl Morrow; Victoria	5817 pts	Clare Thompson; Queensland	5751 pts	Virginia Young; New South Wales	5199 pts
