= 1996–97 Australian Athletics Championships =

- Dates: 27 February–2 March 1997
- Host city: Melbourne, Australia
- Venue: Olympic Park Stadium
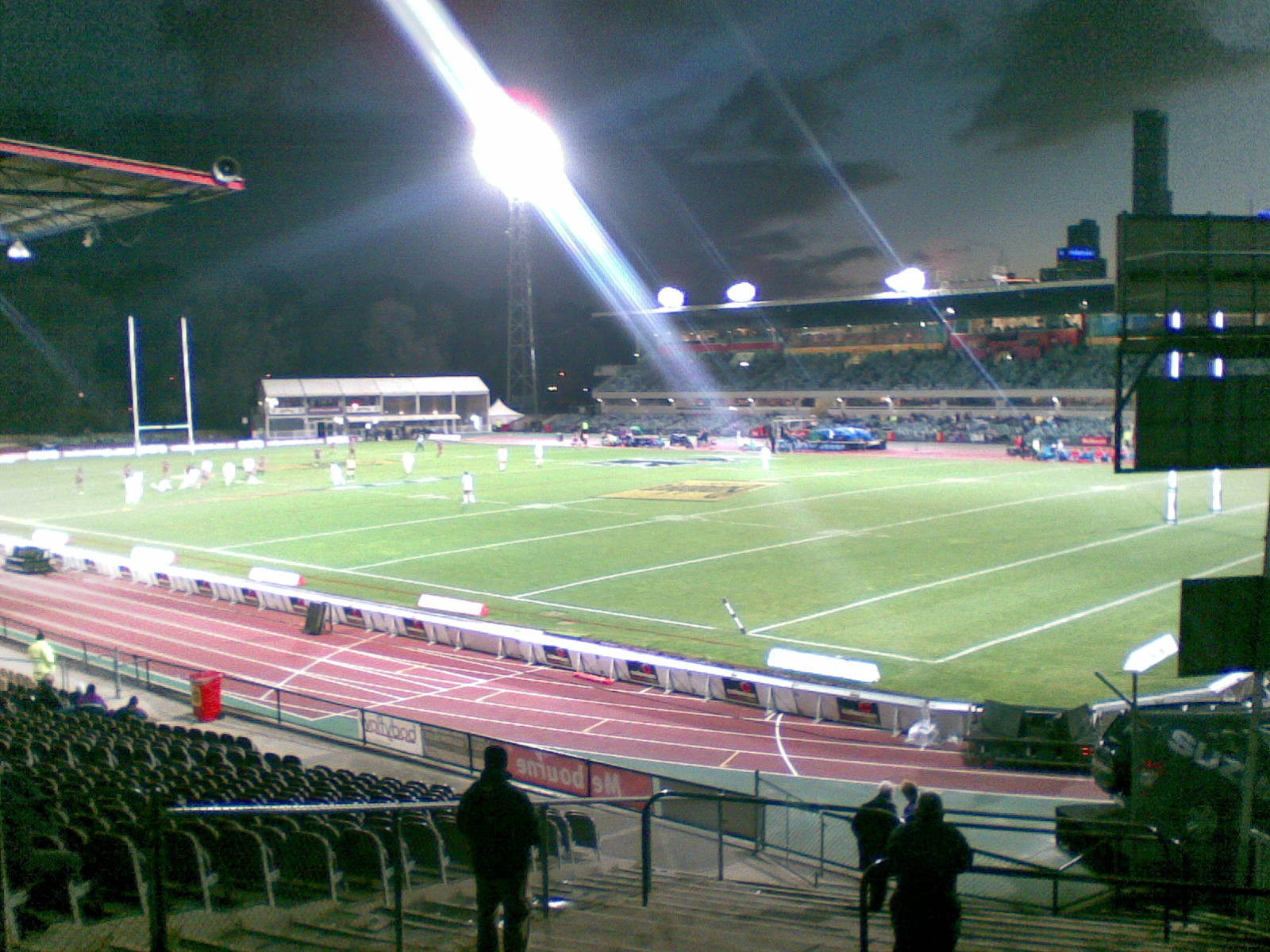

The 1996–97 Australian Athletics Championships was the 75th edition of the national championship in outdoor track and field for Australia. It was held from 27 February–2 March 1997 at the Olympic Park Stadium in Melbourne. It served as a selection meeting for Australia at the 1997 World Championships in Athletics. The men's 10,000 metres event took place separately at the Adelaide Grand Prix on 1 February 1997 while the women's 5000 metres took place at the Melbourne Nike Classic on 20 February 1997. The combined track and field events took place at the Hobart Grand Prix from 14–16 February 1997.

== Medal summary ==
=== Men ===
Event	Gold		Silver		Bronze	
100 metres (Wind: +1.2 m/s)	Steve Brimacombe; Queensland	10.31	Chris Donaldson; New Zealand (NZL)	10.32	Gus Nketia; New Zealand (NZL)	10.39
200 metres (Wind: +0.5 m/s)	Chris Donaldson; New Zealand (NZL)	20.42	Steve Brimacombe; Queensland	20.44	Patrick Johnson; Australian Capital Territory	20.54
400 metres	Brad Jamieson; South Australia	45.94	Declan Stack; Western Australia	46.20	Casey Vincent; Victoria	46.31
800 metres	Elijah Kipruto Maru; Kenya (KEN)	1:47.33	Justin Rinaldi; Victoria	1:47.78	Paul Byrne; Victoria	1:47.87
1500 metres	Paul Bitok; Kenya (KEN)	3:41.56	Scott Petersen; Victoria	3:43.38	David Kibet; Kenya (KEN)	3:44.85
5000 metres	Paul Bitok; Kenya (KEN)	13:31.90	Julian Paynter; Victoria	13:35.13	Lee Troop; Victoria	13:36.69
10,000 metres	Julian Paynter; Victoria	28:35.31	Lee Troop; Victoria	29:16.03	Rod de Highden; Victoria	29:27.56
110 metres hurdles (Wind: -2.5 m/s)	Kyle Vander-Kuyp; Victoria	13.81	David Cooper; Western Australia	14.23	Jagan Hames; South Australia	14.27
400 metres hurdles	Rohan Robinson; Victoria	49.83	Zid Abou Hamed; New South Wales	50.28	Matthew Beckenham; New South Wales	51.21
3000 metres steeplechase	Chris Unthank; Victoria	8:50.12	Martin Dent; New South Wales	8:59.46	Tim Readwin; Victoria	9:06.04
4 × 100 m relay	New South Wales (NSW); Mike Wiener; Toluta'u Koula; Matt Shirvington; Jason Snell	40.49	South Australia (SA); Timothy Johnson; Steve Hutton; James Noblet; Brad Jamieson	40.60	Victoria (VIC); Justin Lewis; David Baxter; Paul Pearce; Nick Rennie	41.13
4 × 400 m relay	New South Wales (NSW); Patrick Dwyer; Todd MacDonald; Robert Medlicott; Lewis Rangott	3:09.25	New Zealand (NZL); Callum Taylor; Robert Hanna; Bjorn Jansen; Henry Semiti Rogo	3:09.65	Victoria (VIC); Robbie Lynch; Christopher Cornish; Mark Moresi; Casey Vincent	3:09.72
5000 metres walk	Nicholas A'Hern; New South Wales	19:24.31	Scott Nelson; New Zealand (NZL)	20:13.84	Brent Vallance; New South Wales	20:25.87
High jump	Tim Forsyth; Victoria	2.36 m	Jagan Hames; South Australia Glen Howard; New Zealand (NZL)	2.18 m	Not awarded	
Pole vault	James Miller; Western Australia	5.30 m	Paul Gibbons; New Zealand (NZL)	5.20 m	Paul Burgess; Western Australia	5.00 m
Long jump	Shane Hair; Western Australia	8.01 m (+2.8 m/s)	Jai Taurima; Queensland	7.88 m (+2.9 m/s)	Jagan Hames; South Australia	7.83 m (+1.3 m/s)
Triple jump	Andrew Murphy; New South Wales	17.03 m (+4.1 m/s)	Tim Barnes; New South Wales	15.78 m (+4.2 m/s)	Stacey Taurima; Queensland	15.71 m (+1.0 m/s)
Shot put	Clay Cross; New South Wales	18.16 m	Justin Anlezark; Queensland	18.00 m	Chris Gaviglio; Queensland	17.18 m
Discus throw	Gerard Duffy; Australian Capital Territory	52.18 m	Ben Jaaniste; New South Wales	52.06 m	Peter Lonsdale; Queensland	51.66 m
Hammer throw	Stuart Rendell; Australian Capital Territory	75.90 m	Demetri Dionisopoulos; Western Australia	64.82 m	Pat Hellier; New Zealand (NZL)	63.44 m
Javelin throw	Adrian Hatcher; Victoria	80.02 m	Richard Brockett; Queensland	73.82 m	Nick Batty; New South Wales	69.98 m
Decathlon	Peter Banks; New South Wales	7915 pts	Matthew McEwen; Queensland	7684 pts	Brendan Tennant; Northern Territory	7593 pts

=== Women ===
Event	Gold		Silver		Bronze	
100 metres (Wind: -0.7 m/s)	Melinda Gainsford; New South Wales	11.25	Lauren Hewitt; Victoria	11.43	Nova Peris-Kneebone; Northern Territory	11.51
200 metres (Wind: +5.0 m/s)	Melinda Gainsford; New South Wales	22.34	Cathy Freeman; Victoria	22.50	Lauren Hewitt; Victoria	22.66
400 metres	Cathy Freeman; Victoria	52.09	Susan Andrews; Tasmania	53.11	Kirilee Buonaccorsi; Tasmania	54.58
800 metres	Saleena Roberts; Queensland	2:04.10	Melanie Collins; Australian Capital Territory	2:04.25	Sandra Dawson; Queensland	2:05.10
1500 metres	Mandy Westbrook; Tasmania	4:17.30	Benita Willis; Queensland	4:17.79	Susan Michelsson; Victoria	4:20.93
5000 metres	Kate Anderson; Victoria	15:14.42	Kylie Risk; Tasmania	15:31.93	Natalie Harvey; Victoria	15:53.35
10,000 metres	Kylie Risk; Tasmania	32:42.72	Maryann Murray; Victoria	33:34.06	Suzanne Malaxos; Western Australia	33:52.83
100 metres hurdles (Wind: +2.8 m/s)	Jane Flemming; New South Wales	13.58	Janiene Ashbridge; New Zealand (NZL)	13.63	Kim Birrell; Victoria	13.80
400 metres hurdles	Evette Cordy; Victoria	57.64	Lauren Poetschka; Western Australia	57.97	Leisa Proctor; Queensland	58.92
4 × 100 m relay	New South Wales (NSW); Nicole Buchanan; Rachael Massey; Rebecca Vormister; Vicky Piggin	45.56	New Zealand (NZL); Janiene Ashbridge; Shelley Stoddart; Jane Arnott; Chantal Brunner	46.14	Western Australia (WA); Ruth Beckham; Jodi Lambert; Kylie Reed; Sharon Sutherland	46.62
4 × 400 m relay	New South Wales (NSW); Shanie Coutts; Rebecca Vormister; Rosemary Hayward; Amber Menzies	3:41.37	Queensland (QLD); Leisa Proctor; Saleena Roberts; Alice Barrett; Sandra Dawson	3:46.29	Victoria (VIC); Anna Deery; Georgina Connell; Jennifer Marshall; Evette Cordy	3:49.39
5000 metres walk	Jane Saville; New South Wales	21:32.26	Natalie Saville; New South Wales	21:34.23	Jill Maybir-Barrett; Queensland	22:49.86
High jump	Alison Inverarity; Western Australia	1.84 m	Lisa Bruty; Victoria	1.81 m	Sherryl Morrow; Victoria	1.81 m
Pole vault	Emma George; Victoria	4.30 m	Tracey Shepherd; Western Australia	3.80 m	Melina Hamilton; New Zealand (NZL)	3.80 m
Long jump	Chantal Brunner; New Zealand (NZL)	6.68 m (+1.0 m/s)	Vicky Piggin; New South Wales	6.28 m (+1.4 m/s)	Kylie Reed; Western Australia	6.23 m (+0.3 m/s)
Triple jump	Tania Dixon; New Zealand (NZL)	13.50 m (+1.4 m/s)	Nicole Mladenis; Western Australia	13.16 m (+4.5 m/s)	Carmen Miller; Tasmania	12.98 m (+4.3 m/s)
Shot put	Beatrice Faumuina; New Zealand (NZL)	15.68 m	Georgette Reed; Canada (CAN)	15.54 m	Helen Toussis; Queensland	15.38 m
Discus throw	Beatrice Faumuina; New Zealand (NZL)	68.28 m	Lisa-Marie Vizaniari; Queensland	65.86 m	Alison Lever; Queensland	53.40 m
Hammer throw	Deborah Sosimenko; New South Wales	65.68 m	Brenda MacNaughton; New South Wales	59.36 m	Karyne Perkins; New South Wales	57.96 m
Javelin throw	Joanna Stone; Queensland	63.78 m	Bina Ramesh; France (FRA)	54.06 m	Kate Farrow; South Australia	53.16 m
Heptathlon	Clare Thompson; Queensland	5534 pts	Sherryl Morrow; Victoria	5229 pts	Theresa Martin; Queensland	5044 pts
