= Athletics at the 1999 Summer Universiade – Women's 400 metres hurdles =

The women's 400 metres hurdles event at the 1999 Summer Universiade was held on 9 and 10 July at the Estadio Son Moix in Palma de Mallorca, Spain.

== Medalists ==
Gold	Silver	Bronze
Daimí Pernía; Cuba	Joanna Hayes; United States	Ulrike Urbansky; Germany

== Results ==
=== Heats ===
Held on 9 July

Rank	Heat	Athlete	Nationality	Time	Notes
1	3	Daimí Pernía	Cuba	56.21	Q, SB
2	2	Tasha Danvers	Great Britain	56.53	Q
3	1	Monika Niederstätter	Italy	56.59	Q
4	3	Sinead Dudgeon	Great Britain	56.66	Q
5	3	Ann Mercken	Belgium	56.79	Q
6	1	Karla Faulhaber	Germany	56.90	Q
7	4	Ulrike Urbansky	Germany	57.01	Q, SB
8	3	Lauren Poetschka	Australia	57.03	q, SB
9	2	Nicola Kidd	New Zealand	57.09	Q, SB
10	2	Joanna Hayes	United States	57.20	Q
11	1	Olga Salnikova	Russia	57.45	Q
12	2	Adri Vlok	South Africa	57.51	q
13	1	Deniece Bell	Canada	57.68	q
14	2	Natalia Alekseeva	Ukraine	57.76	q
15	4	Petra Söderström	Finland	58.30	Q
16	2	Martina Stoop	Switzerland	58.31	
17	4	Dominique Calloway	United States	58.32	Q
18	4	Evette Cordy	Australia	58.53	
19	3	Lara Rocco	Italy	58.56	
20	4	Orsolya Dóczi	Hungary	59.01	
21	3	Cecilia Eksteen	South Africa	59.38	
22	2	Cik Noraseela Mohd Khalid	Malaysia	1:00.74	
23	1	Minerva Navarrete	Chile	1:01.38	
24	1	Diala El Chab	Lebanon	1:04.84	
25	3	Zahra Lachguer	Morocco	1:05.17	
26	1	Patrícia Silva	Peru	1:20.63	
	4	Cora Olivero	Argentina	DNS	
	4	Inicia Coelho da Fonseca	São Tomé and Príncipe	DNS	

=== Semifinals ===
Held on 9 July

Rank	Heat	Athlete	Nationality	Time	Notes
1	2	Daimí Pernía	Cuba	54.57	Q
2	2	Sinead Dudgeon	Great Britain	55.30	Q, PB
3	2	Ulrike Urbansky	Germany	55.49	Q, PB
4	1	Joanna Hayes	United States	55.52	Q
5	2	Ann Mercken	Belgium	55.59	q, SB
6	1	Monika Niederstätter	Italy	55.71	Q, SB
7	2	Petra Söderström	Finland	55.59	q, PB
8	1	Tasha Danvers	Great Britain	55.80	Q
9	1	Karla Faulhaber	Germany	55.97	SB
10	2	Dominique Calloway	United States	56.14	
11	2	Lauren Poetschka	Australia	56.50	SB
12	1	Olga Salnikova	Russia	56.72	SB
13	1	Nicola Kidd	New Zealand	57.53	
14	2	Natalia Alekseeva	Ukraine	57.78	
15	1	Deniece Bell	Canada	58.04	
16	1	Adri Vlok	South Africa	59.49	

=== Final ===
Held on 10 July

Rank	Athlete	Nationality	Time	Notes
1st place, gold medalist(s)	Daimí Pernía	Cuba	53.95	UR
2nd place, silver medalist(s)	Joanna Hayes	United States	54.57	
3rd place, bronze medalist(s)	Ulrike Urbansky	Germany	54.93	
4	Sinead Dudgeon	Great Britain	55.35	
5	Tasha Danvers	Great Britain	55.75	
6	Monika Niederstätter	Italy	55.79	
7	Petra Söderström	Finland	55.83	
8	Ann Mercken	Belgium	56.05	
