= Athletics at the 1999 Pan American Games – Women's 400 metres hurdles =

Women's 400 metres hurdles at the Pan American Games

The women's 400 metres hurdles event at the 1999 Pan American Games was held July 27–28.

== Medalists ==
Gold	Silver	Bronze
Daimí Pernía; Cuba	Andrea Blackett; Barbados	Michelle Johnson; United States

== Results ==
=== Heats ===
Qualification: First 3 of each heat (Q) and the next 2 fastest (q) qualified for the final.

Rank	Heat	Name	Nationality	Time	Notes
1	1	Andrea Blackett	Barbados	55.65	Q
2	2	Daimí Pernía	Cuba	55.81	Q
3	1	Michelle Johnson	United States	56.17	Q
4	2	Karlene Haughton	Canada	56.74	Q
5	2	Joanna Hayes	United States	56.79	Q
6	1	Allison Beckford	Jamaica	57.28	Q
7	1	Deniece Bell	Canada	57.60	q
8	2	Ana Paula Pereira	Brazil	59.69	q
9	1	Ondina Rodríguez	Ecuador	1:04.32	
	2	Debbie-Ann Parris	Jamaica	DNS	

=== Final ===
Rank	Name	Nationality	Time	Notes
1st place, gold medalist(s)	Daimí Pernía	Cuba	53.44	GR
2nd place, silver medalist(s)	Andrea Blackett	Barbados	53.98	
3rd place, bronze medalist(s)	Michelle Johnson	United States	54.22	
4	Karlene Haughton	Canada	55.62	
5	Joanna Hayes	United States	55.90	
6	Allison Beckford	Jamaica	56.52	
7	Deniece Bell	Canada	56.81	
8	Ana Paula Pereira	Brazil	57.92	
