= Athletics at the 1995 Summer Universiade – Women's 400 metres hurdles =

The women's 400 metres hurdles event at the 1995 Summer Universiade was held on 30–31 August at the Hakatanomori Athletic Stadium in Fukuoka, Japan.

== Medalists ==
| Gold | Silver | Bronze |
|---|---|---|
| Heike Meißner; Germany | Ionela Târlea; Romania | Tonya Williams; United States |

== Results ==
=== Heats ===
Qualification: First 3 of each heat (Q) and the next 4 fastest (q) qualified for the semifinals.

| Rank | Heat | Athlete | Nationality | Time | Notes |
|---|---|---|---|---|---|
| 1 | 4 | Tonya Williams | United States | 56.66 | Q |
| 2 | 1 | Alla Shilkina | Ukraine | 56.83 | Q |
| 3 | 4 | Miriam Alonso | Spain | 56.84 | Q |
| 4 | 3 | Anna Knoroz | Russia | 56.89 | Q |
| 5 | 2 | Omolade Akinremi | Nigeria | 56.98 | Q |
| 6 | 4 | Ionela Târlea | Romania | 57.16 | Q |
| 7 | 3 | Georgeta Petrea-Lazar | Romania | 57.34 | Q |
| 8 | 1 | Heike Meißner | Germany | 57.41 | Q |
| 9 | 3 | Ann Mercken | Belgium | 57.47 | Q |
| 10 | 3 | Natalya Torchina | Kazakhstan | 57.58 | q |
| 11 | 4 | Virna De Angeli | Italy | 57.90 | q |
| 12 | 2 | Martina Stoop | Switzerland | 57.93 | Q |
| 13 | 2 | Rebecca Russell | United States | 57.99 | Q |
| 14 | 2 | Li Xiumei | China | 58.37 | q |
| 15 | 2 | Ikiko Yamagata | Japan | 58.42 | q |
| 16 | 1 | Monika Warnicka | Poland | 58.55 | Q |
| 17 | 3 | Hsu Pei-Chin | Chinese Taipei | 58.64 | |
| 18 | 1 | Mika Sasaki | Japan | 58.69 | |
| 19 | 4 | Celine Jeannet | Switzerland | 58.83 | |
| 20 | 1 | Louise Brunning | Great Britain | 59.15 | |
| 21 | 1 | Elizabeth Morland | Canada | 59.80 | |
| 22 | 3 | Terra Barter | Canada | 59.85 | |
| 23 | 2 | Alinah Mogotsi | South Africa | 1:01.36 | |
| 24 | 1 | Stefanie Zotter | Austria | 1:02.95 | |
| 24 | 3 | Choi Hiu Nam | Hong Kong | 1:06.43 | |
| | 2 | Tatyana Tereshchuk | Ukraine | DNF | |
| | 4 | Saidatu Onanuua | Nigeria | DNS | |

=== Semifinals ===
Qualification: First 4 of each semifinal qualified directly (Q) for the final.

| Rank | Heat | Athlete | Nationality | Time | Notes |
|---|---|---|---|---|---|
| 1 | 1 | Miriam Alonso | Spain | 56.12 | Q |
| 2 | 2 | Anna Knoroz | Russia | 56.23 | Q |
| 3 | 1 | Omolade Akinremi | Nigeria | 56.33 | Q |
| 4 | 2 | Heike Meißner | Germany | 56.59 | Q |
| 5 | 1 | Ionela Târlea | Romania | 56.64 | Q |
| 6 | 2 | Alla Shilkina | Ukraine | 56.68 | Q |
| 7 | 2 | Ann Mercken | Belgium | 56.88 | Q |
| 8 | 1 | Tonya Williams | United States | 56.94 | Q |
| 9 | 2 | Rebecca Russell | United States | 57.14 | |
| 10 | 2 | Georgeta Petrea-Lazar | Romania | 57.20 | |
| 11 | 1 | Monika Warnicka | Poland | 57.47 | |
| 12 | 1 | Natalya Torchina | Kazakhstan | 58.85 | |
| 13 | 2 | Li Xiumei | China | 59.26 | |
| 14 | 1 | Ikiko Yamagata | Japan | 59.39 | |
| 15 | 1 | Martina Stoop | Switzerland | 59.67 | |
| 16 | 2 | Virna De Angeli | Italy | 59.88 | |

=== Final ===
| Rank | Lane | Athlete | Nationality | Time | Notes |
|---|---|---|---|---|---|
| 1st place, gold medalist(s) | 3 | Heike Meißner | Germany | 55.57 | |
| 2nd place, silver medalist(s) | 1 | Ionela Târlea | Romania | 55.99 | |
| 3rd place, bronze medalist(s) | 2 | Tonya Williams | United States | 56.04 | |
| 4 | 5 | Omolade Akinremi | Nigeria | 56.11 | |
| 5 | 6 | Anna Knoroz | Russia | 56.34 | |
| 6 | 8 | Ann Mercken | Belgium | 56.65 | |
| 7 | 7 | Alla Shilkina | Ukraine | 57.03 | |
| 8 | 4 | Miriam Alonso | Spain | 57.34 | |
