= 2000 World Junior Championships in Athletics – Women's 400 metres hurdles =

The women's 400 metres hurdles event at the 2000 World Junior Championships in Athletics was held in Santiago, Chile, at Estadio Nacional Julio Martínez Prádanos on 19 and 21 October.

== Medalists ==
Gold	Jana Pittman; Australia
Silver	Marjolein de Jong; Netherlands
Bronze	Melaine Walker; Jamaica

== Results ==
=== Final ===
21 October

Rank	Name	Nationality	Time	Notes
1st place, gold medalist(s)	Jana Pittman	Australia	56.27	
2nd place, silver medalist(s)	Marjolein de Jong	Netherlands	56.50	
3rd place, bronze medalist(s)	Melaine Walker	Jamaica	56.96	
4	Lantosoa Razafinjanahary	Madagascar	58.14	
5	Irēna Žauna	Latvia	58.93	
6	Zofia Malachowska	Poland	59.03	
7	Perla dos Santos	Brazil	59.36	
8	Karolina Tłustochowska	Poland	59.49	

=== Heats ===
19 October

==== Heat 1 ====
Rank	Name	Nationality	Time	Notes
1	Jana Pittman	Australia	56.16	Q
2	Marjolein de Jong	Netherlands	56.26	Q
3	Melaine Walker	Jamaica	57.57	q
4	Larissa Kettenis	Germany	58.87	
5	Patrícia Lopes	Portugal	59.34	
6	Nicola Sanders	United Kingdom	60.07	
7	Claire Ragot	France	61.47	

==== Heat 2 ====
Rank	Name	Nationality	Time	Notes
1	Lantosoa Razafinjanahary	Madagascar	57.29	Q
2	Karolina Tłustochowska	Poland	57.97	Q
3	Randi Smith	United States	59.08	
4	Alena Rücklová	Czech Republic	59.43	
5	Lara Damiani	Italy	59.86	
6	Yusmelys García	Venezuela	60.09	
7	Sapinder Kaur	India	60.50	
8	Alicia Cave	Trinidad and Tobago	61.39	

==== Heat 3 ====
Rank	Name	Nationality	Time	Notes
1	Irēna Žauna	Latvia	58.23	Q
2	Zofia Malachowska	Poland	58.33	Q
3	Perla dos Santos	Brazil	58.40	q
4	Sira Córdoba	Colombia	58.60	
5	Pamela Märzendorfer	Austria	59.03	
6	Tina Kron	Germany	59.65	
7	Anca Liliana Cosariu	Romania	61.36	
	Rachel Delphin	Australia	DQ	IAAF rule 163.3

== Participation ==
According to an unofficial count, 23 athletes from 20 countries participated in the event.

- Australia (2)
- Austria (1)
- Brazil (1)
- Colombia (1)
- Czech Republic (1)
- France (1)
- Germany (2)
- India (1)
- Italy (1)
- Jamaica (1)
- Latvia (1)
- Madagascar (1)
- Netherlands (1)
- Poland (2)
- Portugal (1)
- Romania (1)
- Trinidad and Tobago (1)
- United Kingdom (1)
- United States (1)
- Venezuela (1)
