= 1999 World Championships in Athletics – Women's 400 metres hurdles =

These are the official results of the Women's 400 metres hurdles event at the 1999 IAAF World Championships in Seville, Spain. There were a total number of 28 participating athletes, with four qualifying heats, two semi-finals and the final held on Wednesday 1999-08-25 at 20:45h.

== Final ==
RANK	FINAL	TIME
	Daimí Pernía (CUB)	52.89
	Nezha Bidouane (MAR)	52.90
	Deon Hemmings (JAM)	53.16
4.	Andrea Blackett (BAR)	53.36 (NR)
5.	Sandra Cummings-Glover (USA)	53.65
6.	Michelle Johnson (USA)	54.23
7.	Tetyana Tereshchuk-Antipova (UKR)	54.33
8.	Debbie-Ann Parris (JAM)	56.24

== Semi-finals ==
- Held on Monday 1999-08-23

RANK	HEAT 1	TIME
1.	Deon Hemmings (JAM)	54.00
2.	Andrea Blackett (BAR)	54.18
3.	Tetyana Tereshchuk-Antipova (UKR)	54.55
4.	Michelle Johnson (USA)	54.67
5.	Mame Tacko Diouf (SEN)	55.17
6.	Sinead Dudgeon (GBR)	55.69
7.	Yekaterina Bakhvalova (RUS)	55.76
8.	Ulrike Urbansky (GER)	55.81

RANK	HEAT 2	TIME
1.	Nezha Bidouane (MAR)	53.95
2.	Daimí Pernía (CUB)	53.96
3.	Sandra Cummings-Glover (USA)	54.17
4.	Debbie-Ann Parris (JAM)	54.81
5.	Judit Szekeres (HUN)	54.86
6.	Susan Smith-Walsh (IRL)	55.20
7.	Natalya Torshina (KAZ)	55.26
8.	Monica Niederstatter (ITA)	55.57

== Qualifying heats ==
- Held on Tuesday 1999-08-24

RANK	HEAT 1	TIME
1.	Andrea Blackett (BAR)	54.74
2.	Daimí Pernía (CUB)	54.88
3.	Judit Szekeres (HUN)	55.04
4.	Mame Tacko Diouf (SEN)	55.30
5.	Ann Mercken (BEL)	55.84
6.	Natasha Danvers (GBR)	56.22
7.	Delfina Joaquim (ANG)	59.34

RANK	HEAT 2	TIME
1.	Nezha Bidouane (MAR)	54.64
2.	Debbie-Ann Parris (JAM)	55.35
3.	Sinead Dudgeon (GBR)	55.38
4.	Joanna Hayes (USA)	55.38
5.	Gudrún Arnardóttir (ISL)	55.45
6.	Frida Johansson-Svensson (SWE)	55.59
7.	Olga Dor-Dogadedko (ISR)	57.23

RANK	HEAT 3	TIME
1.	Sandra Cummings-Glover (USA)	54.47
2.	Tetyana Tereshchuk-Antipova (UKR)	54.61
3.	Yekaterina Bakhvalova (RUS)	54.65
4.	Ulrike Urbansky (GER)	54.67
5.	Monica Niederstatter (ITA)	55.10
6.	Mary-Estelle Kapalu (VAN)	1:01.86
	Karlene Haughton (CAN)	DQ

RANK	HEAT 4	TIME
1.	Deon Hemmings (JAM)	54.27
2.	Michelle Johnson (USA)	54.79
3.	Natalya Torshina (KAZ)	54.95
4.	Susan Smith-Walsh (IRL)	55.06
5.	Keri Maddox (GBR)	55.33
6.	Petra Söderström (FIN)	56.93
7.	Ieva Zunda (LAT)	57.90

== See also ==
- 1996 Women's Olympic 400m Hurdles (Atlanta)
- 1998 Men's European Championships 400m Hurdles (Budapest)
- 2000 Men's Olympic 400m Hurdles (Sydney)
- 2002 Men's European Championships 400m Hurdles (Munich)
