= Chulkov =

Chulkov (masculine, Russian: Чулков) or Chulkova (feminine, Russian: Чулкова) is a Russian surname. Notable people with the surname include:

- Anastasia Chulkova (born 1985), Russian racing cyclist
- Danilo Chulkov (fl. 1554-1589), military commder and statesman of Russian Tsardom, founder of Tobolsk
- Georgy Chulkov (1879–1939), Russian poet, editor, writer and critic
- Maksim Chulkov (born 1988), Russian acrobatic gymnast
- Nataliya Chulkova (born 1977), Russian hurdler
