= Athletics at the 1997 Summer Universiade – Women's 400 metres hurdles =

The women's 400 metres hurdles event at the 1997 Summer Universiade was held on 28 and 29 August at the Stadio Cibali in Catania, Italy.

== Medalists ==
Gold	Silver	Bronze
Tatyana Tereshchuk; Ukraine	Yekaterina Bakhvalova; Russia	Daimí Pernía; Cuba

== Results ==
=== Heats ===
Rank	Heat	Athlete	Nationality	Time	Notes
1	1	Tatyana Tereshchuk	Ukraine	54.42	Q
2	1	Michelle Johnson	United States	55.06	Q
3	3	Daimí Pernía	Cuba	55.91	Q
4	3	Ryan Tolbert	United States	55.93	Q
5	3	Miriam Alonso	Spain	56.04	q
6	2	Yekaterina Bakhvalova	Russia	57.22	Q
7	1	Martina Stoop	Switzerland	57.47	q
8	1	Saidat Onanuga	Nigeria	57.53	
9	3	Rikke Rønholt	Denmark	57.78	
10	3	Monika Warnicka	Poland	57.82	
11	1	Ulrike Ahlborn	Germany	57.92	
12	2	Karla Faulhaber	Germany	58.07	Q
13	2	Lauren Poetschka	Australia	58.19	
14	3	Monika Niederstätter	Italy	58.43	
15	1	Evette Cordy	Australia	58.64	
16	2	Irina Lenskaya	Ukraine	58.74	
17	3	Mari Bjone	Norway	59.15	
18	2	Lara Rocco	Italy	59.21	
19	2	Vicki Jamison	Great Britain	59.33	
20	3	Sanja Tripković	Yugoslavia	1:00.06	
21	1	Nicola Kidd	New Zealand	1:00.11	
22	2	Michèle Schenk	Switzerland	1:00.38	
	2	Nivea Sekele	South Africa	DNF	

=== Final ===
Rank	Athlete	Nationality	Time	Notes
1st place, gold medalist(s)	Tatyana Tereshchuk	Ukraine	54.91	
2nd place, silver medalist(s)	Yekaterina Bakhvalova	Russia	55.91	
3rd place, bronze medalist(s)	Daimí Pernía	Cuba	56.13	
4	Michelle Johnson	United States	56.25	
5	Ryan Tolbert	United States	56.29	
6	Miriam Alonso	Spain	57.32	
7	Karla Faulhaber	Germany	58.66	
8	Martina Stoop	Switzerland	58.92	
