= Athletics at the 2002 Commonwealth Games – Women's 400 metres hurdles =

Women's 400 metres hurdles at the Commonwealth Games

The women's 400 metres hurdles event at the 2002 Commonwealth Games was held on 27–28 July.

== Medalists ==
Gold	Silver	Bronze
Jana Pittman; Australia	Debbie-Ann Parris; Jamaica	Karlene Haughton; Canada

== Results ==
=== Heats ===
Qualification: First 3 of each heat (Q) and the next 2 fastest (q) qualified for the final.

Rank	Heat	Name	Nationality	Time	Notes
1	1	Jana Pittman	Australia	54.14	Q, PB
2	1	Debbie-Ann Parris	Jamaica	55.23	Q
3	2	Deon Hemmings	Jamaica	55.78	Q
4	1	Natasha Danvers	England	56.12	Q
5	2	Sonia Brito	Australia	56.29	Q
6	2	Karlene Haughton	Canada	56.45	Q
7	1	Melaine Walker	Jamaica	56.98	q
8	2	Sinead Dudgeon	Scotland	57.11	q
9	2	Tracey Duncan	England	57.45	
10	2	Andrea Blackett	Barbados	57.48	
11	1	Katie Jones	England	57.69	PB
12	1	Carole Kaboud Mebam	Cameroon	59.30	

=== Final ===
Rank	Name	Nationality	Time	Notes
1st place, gold medalist(s)	Jana Pittman	Australia	54.40	
2nd place, silver medalist(s)	Debbie-Ann Parris	Jamaica	55.24	
3rd place, bronze medalist(s)	Karlene Haughton	Canada	56.13	
4	Melaine Walker	Jamaica	57.10	
5	Sonia Brito	Australia	57.79	
6	Sinead Dudgeon	Scotland	58.68	
7	Natasha Danvers	England	1:27.12	
	Deon Hemmings	Jamaica	DNS	
