= Lashinda Demus =

American hurdler (born 1983)

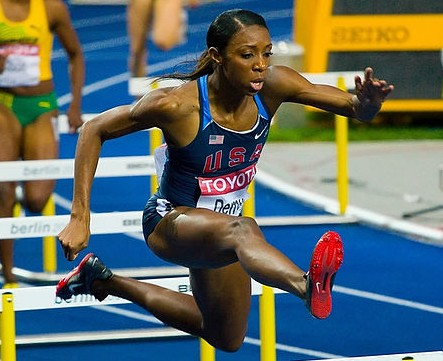
- Demus in 2009

Personal information
- Nationality: American
- Born: March 10, 1983 (age 43) Inglewood, California, U.S.
- Height: 5 ft 7 in (170 cm)
- Weight: 130 lb (59 kg)

Sport
- Country: United States
- Sport: Athletics
- Event: 400 m hurdles
- Retired: 2016

Achievements and titles
- Olympic finals: 2004 Athens; 400 m hurdles, 7th (sf); 2012 London; 400 m hurdles, Gold
- World finals: 2005 Helsinki; 400 m hurdles, Silver; 2009 Berlin; 400 m hurdles, Silver; 4 × 400 m relay, Gold; 2011 Daegu; 400 m hurdles, Gold; 2013 Moscow; 400 m hurdles, Bronze
- Personal bests: 400 m hurdles: 52.47 (Daegu 2011); 400 m: 51.09 (Oslo 2010); 200 m: 23.35 (Coral Gables 2008); 100 m hurdles: 12.96 (Walnut 2011); 100 m: 11.61 (Azusa 2013); Indoors; 400 m: 51.63i (Fayetteville 2004)
Medal record
Women's athletics
Representing the United States
Olympic Games
Gold medal – first place	2012 London	400 m hurdles
World Championships
Gold medal – first place	2009 Berlin	4 × 400 m relay
Gold medal – first place	2011 Daegu	400 m hurdles
Silver medal – second place	2005 Helsinki	400 m hurdles
Silver medal – second place	2009 Berlin	400 m hurdles
Bronze medal – third place	2013 Moscow	400 m hurdles
World U20 Championships
Gold medal – first place	2002 Kingston	400 m hurdles
Gold medal – first place	2002 Kingston	4 × 400 m relay
Pan American U20 Athletics Championships
Gold medal – first place	1999 Tampa	400 m hurdles

Lashinda Demus (born March 10, 1983) is an American retired hurdler who specialized in the 400 meter hurdles, an event in which she was the 2011 world champion and 2012 Olympic gold medalist, becoming the first woman from the United States to win the Olympic 400 m hurdles title.

Demus' personal best time over 400 m hurdles is 52.47 seconds, set in Daegu, South Korea on September 1, 2011, making her as of December 2022 the seventh-fastest woman in history in the event. At the time it was the American record. She is a five-time national champion (400 m hurdles), and a four-time NCAA champion (400 m hurdles, 400 m indoors and 4 × 400 m relay out and indoors).

== Career ==
=== 1998–2001: High school years ===
She is an alumna of the Long Beach Wilson High School where she ran and until 2017 held the national high school record for the 300 m hurdles. She ran on the 4 × 400 m relay team that set the national record in 1998, ran the second fastest time in history in 1999, and then broke its own national record in 2001 (since surpassed by cross town rival Long Beach Polytechnic High School in 2004). She also competed in the 100 meter hurdles, winning the CIF California State Meet in 2001, on the 4 × 100 m relay team, champions in 2001, as well as many of the sprint medley teams. In 1999 and again in 2001, she was named the national Girl's "High School Athlete of the Year" by Track and Field News. She is the only person to be so honored twice, non-consecutively.

=== 2001–2005: Collegiate years ===
After High School, Lashinda attended the University of South Carolina to work under Curtis Frye. Her top times in college were as follows: 55 m H: 7.80; 60 m H: 8.32; 100 m H: 13.35; 400 m H: 54.70; 400 m: 51.38; 800 m: 2:13.77. While at South Carolina, Demus won the World Junior Championship in 2002, the NCAA Indoor Championship at 400 meters in 2004, the first of three National Championships and a silver medal in the 2005 World Championships. Demus also was a member of the school's first NCAA team national championship when the women's track and field team won the 2002 NCAA Outdoor National Championship.

==== 2004 Summer Olympics ====
Demus qualified for the American team at the 2004 Athens Olympics. In the semi-final, she ran exactly the same time as her teammate Sheena Johnson and .7 seconds faster than Brenda Taylor who qualified in the first semi, but Demus had the misfortune to run in the much faster second semi. Her fifth place did not advance her to the final.

=== 2008–2011: World champion at 28 years old ===
Leaving behind the memory of failure to qualify for the 2008 Summer Olympics in Beijing, she won the 2009 US Championships in the 400 m hurdles, with a world-leading 53.78 seconds, gaining herself a place at the 2009 World Championships in Athletics. She improved upon this with a time of 52.63 seconds at the Herculis meeting in July. This was a meeting record and was then the fourth fastest time ever for the event. With that time she was the favorite to win the World Championships but faltered over the last two hurdles as she was passed by Olympic gold medalist Melaine Walker of Jamaica who was en route to the #2 time in history, leaving Demus to take home a second silver medal. However, Demus got her revenge at the 2011 World Championships in Athletics in Daegu, South Korea, when she won the gold medal in 52.47 seconds, a new American Record and the third fastest time in history. She beat reigning Olympic Champion and defending World Champion Melaine Walker, who finished second. Heavy favorite Kaliese Spencer who had set the fastest time in 2011, could only finish fourth behind Demus, Walker and 2010 European Champion and 2004 Olympic 400 m bronze medalist Natalya Antyukh.

=== 2012 Summer Olympics ===
At the 2012 Summer Olympics held in London, Demus originally won the silver medal for the women's 400 m hurdles behind Russia's Natalya Antyukh.

In 2019, following a re-test of doping samples, Antyukh was disqualified with all her results 2013 onward deleted but her 2012 Olympic results were initially not affected. However, following further re-tests in October 2022, Antyukh's results from July 15, 2012, onward were retroactively voided. On 20 December, it was announced that she had been stripped of her 400 m hurdles gold and Demus was upgraded to gold medal in her place, becoming the first woman from the United States to win the Olympic 400 m hurdles title. In a first-ever medal reallocation ceremony held at a Summer Olympic Games, Demus received the gold medal at Paris's Champions Park in conjunction with the 2024 Summer Olympics.

== Achievements ==
Representing the United States
Year	Competition	Venue	Position	Event	Time
1999	Pan American U20 Athletics Championships	Tampa, United States	1st	400 m hurdles	57.04
2001	World University Championships; Universiade	Beijing, China	16th	400 m hurdles	60.78
2002	World Junior Championships	Kingston, Jamaica	1st	400 m hurdles	54.70
2002	World Junior Championships	Kingston, Jamaica	1st	4 × 400 m relay	3:29.95
2004	Olympic Games	Athens, Greece	9th (sf)	400 m hurdles	54.32
2005	World Championships	Helsinki, Finland	2nd	400 m hurdles	53.27
2005	World Athletics Final	Monte Carlo, Monaco	1st	400 m hurdles	53.37
2006	World Athletics Final	Stuttgart, Germany	1st	400 m hurdles	53.42
2006	World Cup	Athens, Greece	2nd	400 m hurdles	54.06
2009	World Championships	Berlin, Germany	2nd	400 m hurdles	52.96
2009	World Championships	Berlin, Germany	1st	4 × 400 m relay	3:17.83
2011	World Championships	Daegu, South Korea	1st	400 m hurdles	52.47
2012	Olympic Games	London, United Kingdom	1st	400 m hurdles	52.77
2013	World Championships	Moscow, Russia	3rd	400 m hurdles	54.27

Sporting positions
Preceded by (Russia) Yuliya Pechonkina	Women's 400 m Hurdles Best Year Performance; 2006	Succeeded by (United States) Tiffany Williams
