= 1997 World Championships in Athletics – Women's 400 metres hurdles =

These are the results of the Women's 400 metres hurdles event at the 1997 World Championships in Athletics in Athens, Greece.

== Medalists ==
Gold	Nezha Bidouane; Morocco (MAR)
Silver	Deon Hemmings; Jamaica (JAM)
Bronze	Kim Batten; United States (USA)

== Results ==
=== Heats ===
First 3 of each Heat (Q) and the next 4 fastest (q) qualified for the semifinals.

Rank	Heat	Name	Nationality	Time	Notes
1	1	Deon Hemmings	Jamaica	54.42	Q
2	1	Sally Gunnell	Great Britain	54.53	Q, SB
3	3	Kim Batten	United States	54.56	Q
4	3	Susan Smith-Walsh	Ireland	54.61	Q, NR
5	1	Ester Goossens	Netherlands	54.84	Q, NR
6	3	Yekaterina Bakhvalova	Russia	55.08	Q
7	2	Tetyana Tereshchuk-Antipova	Ukraine	55.17	Q
8	2	Tonja Buford-Bailey	United States	55.25	Q
9	1	Andrea Blackett	Barbados	55.26	q
10	3	Karlene Haughton	Jamaica	55.27	q
11	2	Anna Knoroz	Russia	55.34	Q
12	4	Nezha Bidouane	Morocco	55.53	Q
13	2	Miriam Alonso	Spain	55.57	q, SB
14	4	Silvia Rieger	Germany	55.64	Q
15	2	Gudrun Arnardottir	Iceland	55.76	q
16	4	Debbie-Ann Parris	Jamaica	55.84	Q
17	3	Judit Szekeres	Hungary	55.99	
18	4	Irina Lenskaya	Ukraine	56.05	
19	4	Natalya Torshina	Kazakhstan	56.64	
20	4	Ryan Tolbert	United States	56.67	
21	2	Donalda Duprey	Canada	56.73	
22	1	Tatyana Ledovskaya	Belarus	56.88	
23	3	Carla Barbarino	Italy	57.05	
24	3	Rikke Ronholt	Denmark	57.26	
25	1	Rebecca Russell-Buchanan	United States	57.79	
26	1	Christina Panagou	Greece	1:01.14	
27	2	Inicia Coelho da Fonseca	São Tomé and Príncipe	1:01.39	

=== Semifinals ===
First 4 of each Semifinal qualified directly (Q) for the final.

Rank	Heat	Name	Nationality	Time	Notes
1	2	Nezha Bidouane	Morocco	53.48	Q, AR
2	1	Kim Batten	United States	53.67	Q
3	2	Deon Hemmings	Jamaica	53.82	Q
4	1	Tetyana Tereshchuk-Antipova	Ukraine	54.02	Q, NR
5	2	Tonja Buford-Bailey	United States	54.48	Q
6	1	Debbie-Ann Parris	Jamaica	54.72	Q
7	1	Susan Smith-Walsh	Ireland	54.72	Q
8	2	Andrea Blackett	Barbados	54.74	Q, NR
9	2	Gudrun Arnardottir	Iceland	54.93	
10	1	Yekaterina Bakhvalova	Russia	55.02	
11	1	Silvia Rieger	Germany	55.08	
12	2	Anna Knoroz	Russia	55.28	
13	1	Karlene Haughton	Jamaica	55.33	
14	1	Miriam Alonso	Spain	55.49	SB
15	2	Ester Goossens	Netherlands	56.17	
	2	Sally Gunnell	Great Britain	DNS	

=== Final ===
Rank	Lane	Name	Nationality	Time	Notes
1st place, gold medalist(s)	3	Nezha Bidouane	Morocco	52.97	AR
2nd place, silver medalist(s)	4	Deon Hemmings	Jamaica	53.09	SB
3rd place, bronze medalist(s)	5	Kim Batten	United States	53.52	
4	6	Tetyana Tereshchuk-Antipova	Ukraine	53.81	NR
5	8	Debbie-Ann Parris	Jamaica	54.19	SB
6	2	Tonja Buford-Bailey	United States	54.77	
7	7	Susan Smith-Walsh	Ireland	55.25	
8	1	Andrea Blackett	Barbados	55.63	
