= Sinead Dudgeon =

Scottish hurdler (born 1976)

Personal information
- Nationality: British (Scottish)
- Born: 9 July 1976 (age 50) Edinburgh, Scotland
- Height: 172 cm (5 ft 8 in)
- Weight: 56 kg (123 lb)

Sport
- Sport: Hurdling
- Event: 400 m hurdles
- Club: Edinburgh Athletic Club
Medal record
Representing Great Britain
Summer Universiade
Bronze medal – third place	1999 Palma	4 × 400 m
Bronze medal – third place	1999 Palma	100 m hurdles
World Junior Championships
Bronze medal – third place	1994 Lisbon	4×100 metres

Sinead Marie Dudgeon (born 9 July 1976) is a retired Scottish athlete who specialised in the 400 metres hurdles and competed at the 2000 Summer Olympics.

== Biography ==
Dudgeon became the British 400 metres hurdles champion after winning the British AAA Championships title at the 1999 AAA Championships.

After a third place finish the following year behind Keri Maddox, she was selected to represent Great Britain at the 2000 Olympic Games in Sydney. Competing in the 400 metres hurdles event Dudgeon failed to reach the semi-finals.

Dudgeon made the finals of the 2002 Commonwealth Games and the 2002 European Championships in addition to finishing second behind Natasha Danvers at the 2002 AAA Championships.

== Competition record ==
Year	Competition	Venue	Position	Event	Notes
Representing Great Britain and Scotland
1994	World Junior Championships	Lisbon, Portugal	–	200 m	DQ
1994	World Junior Championships	Lisbon, Portugal	3rd	4x100 m relay	45.08
1999	World Indoor Championships	Maebashi, Japan	15th (h)	400 m	52.84
1999	Universiade	Palma de Mallorca, Spain	4th	400 m hurdles	55.35
1999	Universiade	Palma de Mallorca, Spain	3rd	4x400 m relay	3:32.25
1999	World Championships	Seville, Spain	14th (sf)	400 m hurdles	55.69
1999	World Championships	Seville, Spain	8th (h)	4x400 m relay	3:27.99
2000	Olympic Games	Sydney, Australia	24th (h)	400 m hurdles	57.82
2001	World Championships	Edmonton, Canada	16th (sf)	400 m hurdles	56.92
2002	Commonwealth Games	Manchester, United Kingdom	6th	400 m hurdles	58.68
2002	Commonwealth Games	Manchester, United Kingdom	4th	4x400 m relay	3:31.50
2002	European Championships	Munich, Germany	8th	400 m hurdles	59.39

== Personal bests ==
Outdoor

- 200 metres – 23.23 (Glasgow 2000)
- 300 metres – 37.08 (Walnut 2001)
- 300 metres hurdles – 40.58 (Gold Coast 2000)
- 400 metres – 52.05 (Budapest 1999)
- 400 metres hurdles – 55.24 (Birmingham 1999)

Indoor

- 400 metres – 52.47 (Birmingham 2001)
