= Kylie Reed =

Australian sportswoman

Personal information
- Nationality: Australian
- Born: 17 December 1974 (age 51) Perth, Western Australia

Sport
- Sport: Bobsleigh; Track and field

Kylie Reed (born 17 December 1974) is an Australian former bobsledder and track and field athlete.

She placed third in the 1996–97 Australian Athletics Championships for long jump, and first in the 1999–2000 Australian Athletics Championships, earning the title in long jump with a distance of 6.57m. She also participated in the 100 metres and 200 metres events in the 2000–2001 season.

Reed was recruited to the Australian women's bobsleigh team by Will Alstergren after failing to qualify for the 2000 Sydney Olympics in athletics. As a bobsledder, Reed worked as a brake-woman with pilot Astrid Loch-Wilkinson from 2003 to 2006, earning the first top twenty placement in the World Cup for the women's team on 10 December 2004. She and Loch-Wilkinson earned the first medal for the women's team with a silver in the Europa Cup on 27 November 2005, and they were the first women's bobsleigh team to qualify for the Olympics for Australia, where they placed 14th.

Reed retired from bobsleigh in 2006.

== Early life ==
Reed was born in Perth on 17 December 1974. As a youth, she was a member of the Little Athletics program at the Bayswater Centre.

== Athletics ==
Australian Athletics Championships

Track and field
Bronze medal – third place	1996-1997	6.23 m Long jump
Bronze medal – third place	1996-1997	46.62 s 4 × 100 metres relay
Gold medal – first place	1999-2000	6.57 m Long jump

=== 1996-1997 season ===
Reed competed in the 1996–97 Australian Athletics Championships, reaching a distance of 6.41m in the long jump in January 1997, beating Olympic finalist Chantal Brunner's 6.39m to finish first. In February 1997 she placed third with a distance of 6.1m, behind Kym Burns' 6.4m and Nicole Boegman's 6.24m. In the finals, Reed finished third with 6.23m, behind Brunner's 6.68m and Vicky Piggin's 6.28m.

=== 1999-2000 season ===
Alongside other West Australian athletes, Reed ran a handicap 100m in January 2000 to raise funds in order to travel to eastern Australia for the Grand Prix Olympic-qualifying matches. In the Olympic B 100m qualifier, she came in fourth with a time of 11.88. In the long jump, she came in first with 6.40m, beating Brunner's 6.35m and Kerrie Perkins' 5.84m.

Reed qualified second in the long jump with a distance of 6.02m at Stadium Australia before officials agreed to lower the infield on the day of a threatened sit-in. She set her best record to date with a distance of 6.57m on 27 February, which won her the 1999-2000 Australian national title and exceeded the Olympic B standard.

On 13 March, she and other Australian athletes competed in an Olympic-qualifying event in Johannesburg. Reed won the long jump with a distance of 6.43m.

=== 2000-2001 season ===
Following the nationals, she had injured her ankle, but she still competed at Perry Lakes Stadium on 27 May running the 100m in 11.95 seconds and the 200m in 24.24. In July 2000, Reed placed second in the long jump with a distance of 6.35m to Bronwyn Thompson's 6.41m.

Though Reed did not meet the Olympic A qualifier by the deadline in August 2000, she was still favored to be included on the team by the West Australian Institute of Sport. Her day two distance put her in 9th place among the contenders with 5.61m. Ultimately, she was not selected, after having stepped over the edge of the take-off area twice, and on her third jump only reaching 5.49m.

By November, Reed joined other West Australia athletes in leaving the area for Melbourne while the Ministry for Sport and the Town of Cambridge disagreed over how to replace Perry Lakes Stadium. In 2001, she was one of 229 athletes nominated to receive the 2000 West Australian ANZ Sports Star of the Year award, which was ultimately presented to Rechelle Hawkes.

== Bobsleigh ==
Bobsleigh record for Kylie Reed
Personal information
- Height: 179 cm (5 ft 10 in)
- Weight: 63 kg (139 lb)

Sport
- Sport: Bobsleigh
- Event: Two-woman bob
- Coached by: Will Alstergren
- Retired: 2006

Achievements and titles
- Personal best: 58.53 seconds (2006 Winter Olympics: Heat 1)
Medal record
	Two-Women's Bobsleigh
	Australia
2005-2006 Europa Cup
Silver medal – second place	Igls – 27 November

Reed joined Australia's first women's bobsleigh team, chosen by coach Will Alstergren for her previous records in both sprinting and long jump events, alongside professional runner Lara Gambino and star basketball player Danielle Lynch. Outside of her time on the bobsleigh team, Reed worked as a banker.

=== 2003–2004 season ===
She served as brake-woman for Astrid Loch-Wilkinson, competing in the 2003–2004 Europa Cup where they finished 9th in the opening event.

Though they qualified for the 2003–2004 Bobsleigh World Cup with their 14-year-old sled, the meet in Königssee was cancelled, and the team was disqualified from the World Championships due to concerns over injury following a crash in one of the heats where the driver sustained a concussion.

=== 2004–2005 season ===
Reed and pilot Loch-Wilkinson secured 5th place at the opening 2004-2005 Europa Cup race in Igls. They finished 4th at Königssee in December 2004.

In their fourth official race, the pair secured Australia's first top 20 World Cup finish while competing in the World Cup on 10 December 2004 with a time of 1:50.11. (Note: The official standings list the location as Nagano, not Igls.)

=== 2005–2006 season ===
In order to afford to compete in the season, Reed and Loch-Wilkinson sold their personal vehicles and overdrew on their credit cards.

==== Europa Cup ====
On 27 November, the pair finished the opening competition of the Europa Cup at Igls in second place with a time of 1:50.96, securing the first medal for Australia's women's bobsleigh team.

==== World Cup ====
In the first competition run of the 2005-2006 World Cup at Calgary on 10 November 2005, Reed and Loch-Wilkinson were ranked 19th with a time of 1:56.04. On 18 November at Lake Placid, the pair finished 19th with a time of 1:58.81. (Note: The same time and rank are recorded for the Intercontinental Cup taking place on the same date at the same location.) On 9 December at Igls, they placed 18th with a time of 1:51.27. (Note: The official standings list the location as Nagano, not Igls.) At Cortina d'Ampezzo on 16 December the pair placed 18th with a time of 1:52.18.

On 13 January 2006, Reed and Loch-Wilkinson became the first Australian women's bobsleigh Olympic-qualified team with their adjusted ranking of 15th at Königssee. Before adjustment, they had ranked 17th with a time of 1:44.49. Prior to the race, the Australian sled had been disqualified for being too old, but the team was able to borrow one from the French in order to compete.

On 20 January, Reed and Loch-Wilkinson placed 14th with a time of 2:20.02 at St. Moritz.

==== 2006 Winter Olympics ====
Just prior to the start of the 2006 Winter Olympics, while Reed was training in Germany, her father died. Additionally, she had contracted the flu, but with Loch-Wilkinson still managed to set personal best times in the push starts at Cesana Pariol.

Reed's position as brake-woman was subject to appeal, something Danielle Lynch attempted but withdrew on 1 February. Reed and Loch-Wilkinson were considered the most improved women's bobsleigh team in Europe.

Reed and Loch-Wilkinson finished 14th with a time of 3:55.11, (Note: The official standings on the IBSF website state that the competition took place at Cesana Pariol, which was the location used for bobsleigh, luge, and skeleton.) with a personal best time in the first heat of 58.53. Afterwards, Reed retired from the sport, citing the $16,000 needed annually to fund her participation on the team.

== #TheLastOlympics ==
In 2024, Reed served as a spokeswoman for the Ukrainian World Congress' #TheLastOlympics campaign, emphasizing in her statements the possibility for the 2024 Paris Olympics to be the last prior to a potential World War, and noting the rise in authoritarian governments.
