= Athletics at the 1999 Summer Universiade – Women's 4 × 400 metres relay =

The women's 4 × 400 metres relay event at the 1999 Summer Universiade was held on 13 July at the Estadio Son Moix in Palma de Mallorca, Spain.

== Results ==
| Rank | Nation | Athletes | Time | Notes |
|---|---|---|---|---|
| 1st place, gold medalist(s) | United States | Yolanda Brown-Moore, Yulanda Nelson, Mikele Barber, Suziann Reid | 3:27.97 | |
| 2nd place, silver medalist(s) | Russia | Natalya Khrushchelyova, Yuliya Taranova, Olga Salnykova, Anna Tkatch | 3:30.54 | |
| 3rd place, bronze medalist(s) | Great Britain | Tasha Danvers, Dawn Higgins, Lee McConnell, Sinead Dudgeon | 3:32.25 | |
| 4 | Romania | Mioara Cosuleanu, Elena Buhăianu, Otilia Ruicu, Ionela Târlea | 3:34.25 | |
| 5 | Spain | María Paz Maqueda, Yolanda Reyes, Miriam Bravo, Elena Córcoles | 3:34.61 | |
| 6 | Italy | Lara Rocco, Federica Selis, Francesca Cola, Monika Niederstätter | 3:34.96 | |
| 7 | South Africa | Yolandi Neethling, Marie-Louise Henning, Adri Vlok, Cecilia Eksteen | 3:38.70 | |
| | Nigeria | Yemi Ogunbanwo, Alice Nwosu, Gloria Kemasuode, Doris Jacob | DNF | |
