= Athletics at the 1994 Commonwealth Games – Women's 400 metres hurdles =

Women's 400 metres hurdles at the Commonwealth Games

The women's 400 metres hurdles event at the 1994 Commonwealth Games was held at the Centennial Stadium in Victoria, British Columbia.

== Medalists ==
| Gold | Silver | Bronze |
|---|---|---|
| Sally Gunnell; England | Deon Hemmings; Jamaica | Debbie-Ann Parris; Jamaica |

== Results ==
=== Heats ===
| Rank | Heat | Name | Nationality | Time | Notes |
|---|---|---|---|---|---|
| 1 | 1 | Sally Gunnell | England | 55.25 | Q |
| 2 | 2 | Deon Hemmings | Jamaica | 56.14 | Q |
| 3 | 2 | Donalda Duprey | Canada | 56.54 | Q |
| 4 | 1 | Gowry Retchakan-Hodge | England | 56.76 | Q |
| 5 | 2 | Debbie-Ann Parris | Jamaica | 57.36 | Q |
| 6 | 1 | Karlene Haughton | Jamaica | 57.47 | Q |
| 7 | 2 | Jacqui Parker | England | 57.53 | q |
| 8 | 1 | Maria Usifo | Nigeria | 58.33 | q |
| 9 | 1 | Jane Low | Scotland | 58.43 | |
| 10 | 2 | Stephanie McCann | Northern Ireland | 58.72 | |
| 11 | 1 | Lauren Poetschka | Australia | 59.23 | |
| 12 | 2 | Jillian McDermid | Canada | 59.34 | |
| 13 | 2 | Lana Uys | South Africa | 59.41 | |
| 14 | 2 | Mary-Estelle Kapalu | Vanuatu | 59.94 | |
| 15 | 1 | Erica Peterson | Canada | 1:00.31 | |
| 16 | 1 | Stephanie Llewellyn | Northern Ireland | 1:00.41 | |

=== Final ===
| Rank | Lane | Name | Nationality | Time | Notes |
|---|---|---|---|---|---|
| 1st place, gold medalist(s) | 6 | Sally Gunnell | England | 54.51 | GR |
| 2nd place, silver medalist(s) | 4 | Deon Hemmings | Jamaica | 55.11 | |
| 3rd place, bronze medalist(s) | 2 | Debbie-Ann Parris | Jamaica | 55.25 | |
| 4 | 5 | Donalda Duprey | Canada | 55.39 | |
| 5 | 3 | Gowry Retchakan-Hodge | England | 56.69 | |
| 6 | 7 | Jacqui Parker | England | 56.72 | |
| 7 | 8 | Karlene Haughton | Jamaica | 57.00 | |
| 8 | 1 | Maria Usifo | Nigeria | 59.20 | |
