= Athletics at the 1991 Summer Universiade – Women's 4 × 400 metres relay =

The women's 4 × 400 metres relay event at the 1991 Summer Universiade was held at the Don Valley Stadium in Sheffield on 25 July 1991.

== Results ==
Rank	Nation	Athletes	Time	Notes
1st place, gold medalist(s)	United States	Keisha Demas, Tasha Downing, Teri Smith, Maicel Malone	3:27.93	
2nd place, silver medalist(s)	Soviet Union	Yelena Golesheva, Inna Yevseyeva, Galina Moskvina, Anna Knoroz	3:29.64	
3rd place, bronze medalist(s)	Poland	Barbara Grzywocz, Agata Sadurska, Monika Warnicka, Sylwia Pachut	3:35.03	
4	Romania	Aura Cracea, Cătălina Gheorghiu, Nicoleta Căruțașu, Camelia Jianu	3:38.74	
	Italy	Francesca Lanzara, Francesca Carbone, Maria Vincenza Marasco, Cristiana Picchi	DQ	
