= Ann Mercken =

Belgian hurdler (born 1974)

Personal information
- Born: 6 May 1974 (age 52) Hasselt, Belgium
- Height: 1.77 m (5 ft 10 in)
- Weight: 71 kg (157 lb) (1996)

Sport
- Sport: Track and field
- Event: 400 metres hurdles
- Club: AVT Hasselt

Ann Mercken (born 6 May 1974 in Hasselt) is a retired Belgian athlete who specialised in the 400 metres hurdles. She represented her country at the 1996 Summer Olympics reaching the semifinals. She also competed at the 1999 World Championships.

Her personal best in the event is 54.95, set in 1996. This was the national record until Paulien Couckuyt improved it to 54.90 at the 2020 Summer Olympics.

== Competition record ==
| Year | Competition | Venue | Position | Event | Notes |
Representing Belgium
| 1995 | Universiade | Fukuoka, Japan | 6th | 400 m hurdles | 56.65 |
| 1996 | Olympic Games | Atlanta, United States | 12th (sf) | 400 m hurdles | 54.95 |
| 1998 | European Championships | Budapest, Hungary | 18th (h) | 400 m hurdles | 57.39 |
| 1999 | Universiade | Palma de Mallorca, Spain | 8th | 400 m hurdles | 56.05 |
| 1999 | World Championships | Seville, Spain | 21st (h) | 400 m hurdles | 55.84 |
| 2001 | Universiade | Beijing, China | 5th | 400 m hurdles | 56.42 |
| 2002 | European Championships | Munich, Germany | 11th (h) | 400 m hurdles | 57.02 |
