= Athletics at the 2001 Summer Universiade – Women's 400 metres hurdles =

The women's 400 metres hurdles event at the 2001 Summer Universiade was held at the Workers Stadium in Beijing, China on 30–31 August.

== Medalists ==
Gold	Silver	Bronze
Tasha Danvers; Great Britain	Małgorzata Pskit; Poland	Sonia Brito; Australia

== Results ==
=== Heats ===
Rank	Heat	Athlete	Nationality	Time	Notes
1	1	Sonia Brito	Australia	56.70	Q
2	4	Carmo Tavares	Portugal	56.88	Q
3	2	Maren Schott	Germany	57.25	Q
4	3	Tasha Danvers	Great Britain	57.26	Q
5	2	Ann Mercken	Belgium	57.62	Q
6	2	Nathalie Zamboni	Switzerland	57.68	Q
7	2	Monika Niederstätter	Italy	57.79	q
8	3	Małgorzata Pskit	Poland	57.99	Q
9	3	Princesa Oliveros	Colombia	57.99	Q
10	2	Isabelle Gervais	Canada	58.03	q
11	1	Isabel Silva	Brazil	58.07	Q
12	3	Song Yinglan	China	58.29	q
13	4	Lashinda Demus	United States	58.31	Q
14	4	Sylvanie Morandais	France	58.43	Q
15	1	Kerryn van Zyl	South Africa	58.44	Q
16	2	Li Yulian	China	58.73	q
17	2	Sonja Bowe	New Zealand	58.90	
18	1	Tawa Babatunde	Canada	58.94	
19	4	Tracey Duncan	Great Britain	59.30	
20	4	Perla Regina dos Santos	Brazil	59.68	
21	1	Christina Schnohr	Denmark	59.79	
22	3	Adri Vlok	South Africa	1:00.74	
23	4	Julia Krasnova	Estonia	1:01.12	
24	3	Sandra Oliveros	Guatemala	1:03.32	
25	4	Patricia Riesco	Peru	1:05.86	
26	1	Diana Riesco	Peru	1:17.52	
	1	Brenda Taylor	United States	DNF	

=== Semifinals ===
Rank	Heat	Athlete	Nationality	Time	Notes
1	2	Tasha Danvers	Great Britain	55.70	Q
2	2	Sonia Brito	Australia	56.13	Q
3	2	Monika Niederstätter	Italy	56.40	Q
4	2	Nathalie Zamboni	Switzerland	56.70	q
5	1	Małgorzata Pskit	Poland	56.74	Q
6	2	Ann Mercken	Belgium	56.79	q
7	1	Sylvanie Morandais	France	56.93	Q
8	1	Carmo Tavares	Portugal	57.17	Q
9	1	Princesa Oliveros	Colombia	57.19	
10	1	Song Yinglan	China	57.50	
11	1	Isabel Silva	Brazil	57.61	
12	1	Maren Schott	Germany	57.62	
13	2	Kerryn van Zyl	South Africa	58.27	
14	2	Li Yulian	China	59.21	
15	1	Isabelle Gervais	Canada	1:00.03	
16	2	Lashinda Demus	United States	1:00.78	

=== Final ===
Rank	Athlete	Nationality	Time	Notes
1st place, gold medalist(s)	Tasha Danvers	Great Britain	54.94	
2nd place, silver medalist(s)	Małgorzata Pskit	Poland	55.27	
3rd place, bronze medalist(s)	Sonia Brito	Australia	55.72	
4	Sylvanie Morandais	France	56.11	
5	Ann Mercken	Belgium	56.42	
6	Nathalie Zamboni	Switzerland	56.86	
7	Carmo Tavares	Portugal	57.28	
8	Monika Niederstätter	Italy	57.49	
