= 1994 World Junior Championships in Athletics – Women's 4 × 100 metres relay =

The women's 4×100 metres relay event at the 1994 World Junior Championships in Athletics was held in Lisbon, Portugal, at Estádio Universitário de Lisboa on 23 and 24 July.

== Medalists ==
Gold	Tulia Robinson; Beverley Langley; Kerry-Ann Richards; Astia Walker; Jamaica
Silver	Sandra Roos; Gabriele Becker; Sandra Görigk; Esther Möller; Germany
Bronze	Diane Allahgreen; Susan Williams; Sinead Dudgeon; Rebecca Drummond; United Kingdom

== Results ==
=== Final ===
24 July

Rank	Nation	Competitors	Time	Notes
1st place, gold medalist(s)	Jamaica	Tulia Robinson; Beverley Langley; Kerry-Ann Richards; Astia Walker	44.01	
2nd place, silver medalist(s)	Germany	Sandra Roos; Gabriele Becker; Sandra Görigk; Esther Möller	44.78	
3rd place, bronze medalist(s)	United Kingdom	Diane Allahgreen; Susan Williams; Sinead Dudgeon; Rebecca Drummond	45.08	
4	Bulgaria	Tonya Vassileva; Nora Ivanova; Vera Georgieva; Magdalena Khristova	45.22	
5	Italy	Roberta Bettio; Monica Giolli; Valentina Cuccia; Ilaria Sieni	45.48	
6	New Zealand	Kelly Miller; Janette Wise; Caro Hunt; Jane Arnott	45.57	
	South Africa	Tamaryn Sawyer; Esmari Le Roux; Nadine Fensham; Heide Seÿerling	DQ	
	Spain	Silvia Rodríguez; María José Ruiperez; Monica Marin; Eva Cacho	DNF	

=== Heats ===
23 July

==== Heat 1 ====
Rank	Nation	Competitors	Time	Notes
1	Jamaica	Tulia Robinson; Beverley Langley; Kerry-Ann Richards; Peta-Gaye Dowdie	44.23	Q
2	Bulgaria	Tonya Vassileva; Nora Ivanova; Vera Georgieva; Magdalena Khristova	45.64	Q
3	Spain	Silvia Rodríguez; María José Ruiperez; Monica Marin; Eva Cacho	45.74	q
4	New Zealand	Kelly Miller; Janette Wise; Caro Hunt; Jane Arnott	45.93	q
	Canada	Lisa Duffus; Cathy Rejouis; Mame Twumasi; Francis Seally	DNF	

==== Heat 2 ====
Rank	Nation	Competitors	Time	Notes
1	South Africa	Tamaryn Sawyer; Esmari Le Roux; Nadine Fensham; Heide Seÿerling	45.63	Q
2	Italy	Roberta Bettio; Monica Giolli; Valentina Cuccia; Ilaria Sieni	46.03	Q
3	Cuba	Yudalis Díaz; Katia Brito; Daimí Pernía; Dainelky Pérez	46.27	
4	Sweden	Linda Mårtensson; Ulrika Larsson; Emma Holmqvist; Pernilla Andersson	46.47	
5	Australia	Rachel Links; Bindee Goon Chew; Elona Reinalda; Catherine Horder	46.95	
	United States	Carmen Banks; Aspen Burkett; LaTasha Colander; Sabrina Kelly	DQ	

==== Heat 3 ====
Rank	Nation	Competitors	Time	Notes
1	Germany	Sandra Roos; Gabriele Becker; Sandra Görigk; Esther Möller	45.66	Q
2	United Kingdom	Diane Allahgreen; Susan Williams; Sinead Dudgeon; Rebecca Drummond	46.71	Q
	Czech Republic	Štepánka Klapácová; Bohdana Válková; Radana Volná; Hana Benešová	DQ	
	France	Sylviane Félix; Frédérique Bangué; Marie Joëlle Dogbo; Fabé Dia	DQ	

== Participation ==
According to an unofficial count, 61 athletes from 15 countries participated in the event.

- Australia (4)
- Bulgaria (4)
- Canada (4)
- Cuba (4)
- Czech Republic (4)
- France (4)
- Germany (4)
- Italy (4)
- Jamaica (5)
- New Zealand (4)
- South Africa (4)
- Spain (4)
- Sweden (4)
- United Kingdom (4)
- United States (4)
