= 1992 World Junior Championships in Athletics – Women's 400 metres hurdles =

The women's 400 metres hurdles event at the 1992 World Junior Championships in Athletics was held in Seoul, South Korea, at Olympic Stadium on 16 and 18 September.

== Medalists ==
Gold	Georgeta Petrea; Romania
Silver	Erica Peterson; Canada
Bronze	Winsome Cole; Jamaica

== Results ==
=== Final ===
18 September

Rank	Name	Nationality	Time	Notes
1st place, gold medalist(s)	Georgeta Petrea	Romania	58.03	
2nd place, silver medalist(s)	Erica Peterson	Canada	58.09	
3rd place, bronze medalist(s)	Winsome Cole	Jamaica	58.15	
4	Anita Oppong	Germany	58.24	
5	Anja Höcke	Germany	58.64	
6	Vyvyan Rhodes	United Kingdom	59.27	
7	Michèle Schenk	Switzerland	59.70	
8	Debbie-Ann Parris	Jamaica	60.81	

=== Heats ===
16 September

==== Heat 1 ====
Rank	Name	Nationality	Time	Notes
1	Anja Höcke	Germany	58.65	Q
2	Winsome Cole	Jamaica	59.21	Q
3	Vyvyan Rhodes	United Kingdom	59.40	q
4	Lana Jekabsone	Latvia	59.97	
5	Kylie Robertson	Australia	60.33	
6	Chantale Dejardin	Canada	62.38	

==== Heat 2 ====
Rank	Name	Nationality	Time	Notes
1	Georgeta Petrea	Romania	58.54	Q
2	Debbie-Ann Parris	Jamaica	59.27	Q
3	Isabelle D'Herbécourt	France	60.02	
4	Nioka Gray	Australia	60.43	
5	Sakura Matsukuma	Japan	61.17	
6	Mirenda Francourt	Seychelles	62.55	
7	Yvonne Harrison	United States	64.26	

==== Heat 3 ====
Rank	Name	Nationality	Time	Notes
1	Erica Peterson	Canada	58.00	Q
2	Anita Oppong	Germany	58.20	Q
3	Michèle Schenk	Switzerland	58.95	q
4	Ikiko Yamagata	Japan	59.93	
5	Silje Rasmussen	Norway	60.86	
6	Maja Gorjup	Slovenia	63.61	

== Participation ==
According to an unofficial count, 19 athletes from 14 countries participated in the event.

- Australia (2)
- Canada (2)
- France (1)
- Germany (2)
- Jamaica (2)
- Japan (2)
- Latvia (1)
- Norway (1)
- Romania (1)
- Seychelles (1)
- Slovenia (1)
- Switzerland (1)
- United Kingdom (1)
- United States (1)
