= Miriam Alonso =

Spanish hurdler (born 1970)

Personal information
- Born: 6 June 1970 (age 56) Ulm, West Germany
- Height: 1.68 m (5 ft 6 in)
- Weight: 52 kg (115 lb) (1996)

Sport
- Sport: Track and field
- Event: 400 metres hurdles
- Club: Sol Fuerza

Miriam Alonso Manteca (born 6 June 1970 in Ulm, West Germany) is a retired Spanish athlete who specialised in the 400 metres hurdles. She represented her country at the 1996 Summer Olympics, as well as three consecutive World Championships, starting in 1993.

Her personal best in the event is 55.45 seconds (Monachil 1996).

== Competition record ==
Year	Competition	Venue	Position	Event	Notes
Representing Spain
1986	World Junior Championships	Athens, Greece	12th (sf)	400m hurdles	62.21
1989	European Junior Championships	Varaždin, Yugoslavia	7th	400 m hurdles	60.08
1989	European Junior Championships	Varaždin, Yugoslavia	8th	4 × 400 m relay	3:42.47
1990	European Championships	Split, Yugoslavia	23rd (h)	400 m hurdles	58.35
1990	Ibero-American Championships	Manaus, Brazil	2nd	400 m hurdles	59.20
1992	Ibero-American Championships	Seville, Spain	2nd	400 m hurdles	57.01
1993	Mediterranean Games	Narbonne, France	4th	400 m hurdles	58.06
1993	World Championships	Stuttgart, Germany	29th (h)	400 m hurdles	58.62
1993	World Championships	Stuttgart, Germany	12th (h)	4 × 400 m relay	3:38.61
1995	World Championships	Gothenburg, Sweden	17th (h)	400 m hurdles	58.36
1995	Universiade	Fukuoka, Japan	8th	400 m hurdles	57.34
1996	Olympic Games	Atlanta, United States	22nd (h)	400 m hurdles	56.53
1997	Mediterranean Games	Bari, Italy	2nd	400 m hurdles	55.89
1997	Mediterranean Games	Bari, Italy	3rd	4 × 400 m relay	3:31.93
1997	World Championships	Athens, Greece	14th (sf)	400 m hurdles	55.49
1997	Universiade	Catania, Italy	6th	400 m hurdles	57.32
2001	Mediterranean Games	Radès, Tunisia	7th	400 m hurdles	59.84
2001	Mediterranean Games	Radès, Tunisia	4th	4 × 400 m relay	3:43.14
