= Michelle Johnson (hurdler) =

American hurdler (born 1974)

Personal information
- Born: April 12, 1974 (age 52) Portland, Oregon, United States

Sport
- Sport: Track and field
Medal record
Representing United States
Pan American Games
Bronze medal – third place	1999 Winnipeg	400 m hurdles

Michelle Johnson Skog (born April 12, 1974) is an American female former track and field hurdler who specialized in the 400-meter hurdles. She set personal records of 54.15 seconds for the 400 m hurdles in 1999 and 12.88 seconds for the 100-meter hurdles in 1998. She was a bronze medalist at the 1999 Pan American Games and represented her country at the 1999 World Championships in Athletics and 1998 Goodwill Games.

== Career ==
Born in Portland, Oregon, she took up track at the age of seven before moving into hurdling while at high school in Vacaville, California and Paradise Valley High School in Arizona. She attended the University of Arizona, earning a degree in family studies, and competed athletically for the Arizona Wildcats. She was a finalist in the 100 m hurdles in the 1993 Pac-10 Conference then again a finalist in the 400 m hurdles at the 1994 regionals. She reached national level thereafter, taking seventh in the 400 m hurdles at the 1995 NCAA Women's Division I Outdoor Track and Field Championships, as well as being a hurdles semi-finalist. In her last year she was again a finalist and semi-finalist at the 1996 NCAA Outdoor Championships, as well as being a 55-meter hurdles finalist at the NCAA Indoors. At Pac-10 level, she was 400 m hurdles champion and runner-up over 100 m hurdles.

Johnson began competing at senior national events from 1995, focusing mostly on 400 m hurdles after graduation. She was eighth at the 1995 USA Outdoor Track and Field Championships, a semi-finalist at both distances at the 1996 United States Olympic Trials (track and field), sixth in 400 m hurdles at the 1997 event, before finally reaching the podium in second at the 1998 USA Outdoor Track and Field Championships behind Kim Batten.

The 1998 season proved to be a breakthrough for Johnson. She set a lifetime best of 12.88 seconds in the 100 m hurdles and also dipped under 55 seconds for the 400 m hurdles for the first time. Her international senior debut followed at the 1998 Goodwill Games, where she narrowly missed out on a medal in fourth place behind Batten. (She had also been fourth at the 1997 Summer Universiade as a collegiate athlete).

The pinnacle of her career came in 1999. A runner-up finish to Sandra Glover at the 1999 USA Outdoor Track and Field Championships brought her selection for the national team. She ran a personal record of 54.22 seconds to take the bronze at the Pan American Games (behind Daimí Pernía of Cuba and Andrea Blackett of Barbados). Shortly before the World Championships she ran a lifetime best of 54.15 seconds at the Weltklasse Zürich. This time ultimately ranked her tenth in the world for that season. She came close to that mark in the final at the 1999 World Championships in Athletics, finishing in sixth place.

Johnson's career ended shortly after: she failed to make it into the top three at the 2000 United States Olympic Trials and the 2001 USA Outdoor Track and Field Championships and ceased to compete at a high level thereafter.

== International competitions ==
Year	Competition	Venue	Position	Event	Notes
1997	Universiade	Catania, Italy	4th	400 m hurdles	56.25
1998	Goodwill Games	Uniondale, United States	4th	400 m hurdles	55.18
1999	World Championships	Seville, Spain	6th	400 m hurdles	54.23
1999	Pan American Games	Winnipeg, Canada	3rd	400 m hurdles	54.22 m
