= Monika Warnicka =

Polish hurdler

Personal information
- Born: 26 April 1969 (age 57) Przemyśl, Poland
- Height: 1.76 m (5 ft 9 1/2 in)
- Weight: 60 kg (130 lb)

Sport
- Sport: Athletics
- Event: 400 metres hurdles
- Club: AZS-AWF Wrocław
Medal record
Representing Poland
Summer Universiade
Bronze medal – third place	1991 Sheffield	4x400 m relay

Monika Warnicka (born 26 April 1969) is a retired Polish athlete who specialised in the 400 metres hurdles. She represented her country at two World Championships, in 1993 and 1995.

Her personal best in the event is 55.82 seconds set in Rome in 1993.

== Competition record ==
Year	Competition	Venue	Position	Event	Notes
Representing Poland
1991	Universiade	Sheffield, United Kingdom	19th (h)	400 m hurdles	59.40
1991	Universiade	Sheffield, United Kingdom	3rd	4x400 m relay	3:35.03
1993	Universiade	Buffalo, United States	6th	400 m hurdles	58.25
1993	World Championships	Stuttgart, Germany	26th (h)	400 m hurdles	57.38
1994	European Championships	Helsinki, Finland	14th (sf)	400 m hurdles	56.70
1994	European Championships	Helsinki, Finland	7th	4x400 m relay	3:29.75
1995	World Championships	Gothenburg, Sweden	9th (sf)	400 m hurdles	56.88
1995	Universiade	Fukuoka, Japan	11th (sf)	400 m hurdles	57.47
1997	Universiade	Catania, Italy	10th (h)	400 m hurdles	57.82
