= 1986 World Junior Championships in Athletics – Women's 400 metres hurdles =

The women's 400 metres hurdles event at the 1986 World Junior Championships in Athletics was held in Athens, Greece, at Olympic Stadium on 16, 17 and 18 July.

== Medalists ==
Gold	Claudia Bartl; East Germany
Silver	Kellie Roberts; United States
Bronze	Svetlana Lukashevich; Soviet Union

== Results ==
=== Final ===
18 July

Rank	Name	Nationality	Time	Notes
1st place, gold medalist(s)	Claudia Bartl	East Germany	56.76	
2nd place, silver medalist(s)	Kellie Roberts	United States	56.80	
3rd place, bronze medalist(s)	Svetlana Lukashevich	Soviet Union	57.92	
4	Jill McDermid	Canada	58.00	
5	Ana Maria Draghia	Romania	58.74	
6	Shawn Moore	United States	58.80	
7	Zdravka Georgieva	Bulgaria	60.32	
8	Marina Matyakina	Soviet Union	61.14	

=== Semifinals ===
17 July

==== Semifinal 1 ====
Rank	Name	Nationality	Time	Notes
1	Kellie Roberts	United States	57.86	Q
2	Jill McDermid	Canada	58.27	Q
3	Marina Matyakina	Soviet Union	59.25	Q
4	Ana Maria Draghia	Romania	59.60	Q
5	Marie Womplou	Côte d'Ivoire	60.29	
6	Dejana Rakita	Yugoslavia	61.40	
7	Jacinta Kimwetich	Kenya	63.13	
8	Ana María Núñez	Uruguay	63.85	

==== Semifinal 2 ====
Rank	Name	Nationality	Time	Notes
1	Claudia Bartl	East Germany	58.23	Q
2	Svetlana Lukashevich	Soviet Union	59.06	Q
3	Shawn Moore	United States	59.84	Q
4	Zdravka Georgieva	Bulgaria	61.19	Q
5	Francesca Lanzara	Italy	61.97	
6	Miriam Alonso	Spain	62.21	
7	Adriana Martínez	Ecuador	62.38	
	Irena Dominc	Yugoslavia	DNS	

=== Heats ===
16 July

==== Heat 1 ====
Rank	Name	Nationality	Time	Notes
1	Claudia Bartl	East Germany	57.90	Q
2	Svetlana Lukashevich	Soviet Union	58.50	Q
3	Shawn Moore	United States	60.75	Q
4	Dejana Rakita	Yugoslavia	61.53	Q
5	Jacinta Kimwetich	Kenya	62.40	q
6	Adriana Martínez	Ecuador	62.94	q
7	Rajwant Kaur	India	66.82	

==== Heat 2 ====
Rank	Name	Nationality	Time	Notes
1	Ana Maria Draghia	Romania	60.12	Q
2	Irena Dominc	Yugoslavia	60.64	Q
3	Marina Matyakina	Soviet Union	60.86	Q
4	Marie Womplou	Côte d'Ivoire	60.89	Q
5	Ana María Núñez	Uruguay	64.86	q
6	Marie-France Pare	Canada	66.03	
7	Niusha Mansilla	Bolivia	66.88	

==== Heat 3 ====
Rank	Name	Nationality	Time	Notes
1	Kellie Roberts	United States	57.54	Q
2	Jill McDermid	Canada	58.94	Q
3	Zdravka Georgieva	Bulgaria	61.20	Q
4	Francesca Lanzara	Italy	61.36	Q
5	Miriam Alonso	Spain	63.84	q
6	María Belehrí	Greece	66.00	
7	Alma Leticia Jiménez	Guatemala	66.80	

== Participation ==
According to an unofficial count, 21 athletes from 17 countries participated in the event.

- Bolivia (1)
- Bulgaria (1)
- Canada (2)
- Côte d'Ivoire (1)
- East Germany (1)
- Ecuador (1)
- Greece (1)
- Guatemala (1)
- India (1)
- Italy (1)
- Kenya (1)
- Romania (1)
- Soviet Union (2)
- Spain (1)
- United States (2)
- Uruguay (1)
- Yugoslavia (2)
