= Nataliya Chulkova =

Russian hurdler (born 1977)

Personal information
- Nationality: Russian
- Born: 5 December 1977 (age 48) Kovrov, Russian SFSR, Soviet Union

Sport
- Sport: Track and field
- Event: 400 metres hurdles

Nataliya Chulkova (Russian: Наталья Чулкова; born 5 December 1977) is a Russian hurdler. Born in Kovrov, Vladimir Oblast, she competed in the women's 400 metres hurdles at the 2000 Summer Olympics.
