= Karlene Haughton =

Jamaican-Canadian hurdler (born 1972)

Personal information
- Born: 18 October 1972 (age 53) Bethany, Saint Ann, Jamaica

Sport
- Sport: Track and field
- Club: Phoenix Track Club, Scarborough, Canada
Medal record
Representing Canada
Commonwealth Games
Bronze medal – third place	1998 Kuala Lumpur	400m hurdles
Bronze medal – third place	1998 Kuala Lumpur	4x400m relay
Bronze medal – third place	2002 Manchester	400m hurdles

Karlene Vivienne Haughton (born 18 October 1972) is a Jamaican-born Canadian retired athlete specialising in the 400 metres hurdles. She changed allegiance from her native Jamaica in 1998.

Haughton competed for San Jacinto College in the NJCAA and later for the St. Augustine's Falcons track and field team in the NCAA Division II.

Her personal best in the event is 55.11 set in 1997.

== Competition record ==
Year	Competition	Venue	Position	Event	Notes
Representing Jamaica
1991	CARIFTA Games (U20)	Port of Spain, Trinidad and Tobago	3rd	100 m hurdles	14.65 (w)
1994	Commonwealth Games	Victoria, British Columbia, Canada	7th	400 m hurdles	57.00
1997	World Championships	Athens, Greece	13th (sf)	400 m hurdles	55.33
Representing Canada
1998	Commonwealth Games	Kuala Lumpur, Malaysia	3rd	400 m hurdles	55.53
1998	Commonwealth Games	Kuala Lumpur, Malaysia	3rd	4 × 400 m relay	3:29.97
1999	Pan American Games	Winnipeg, Manitoba, Canada	4th	400 m hurdles	55.62
1999	World Championships	Seville, Spain	–	400 m hurdles	DQ
1999	World Championships	Seville, Spain	9th (h)	4 × 400 m relay	3:28.47
2000	Olympic Games	Sydney, Australia	12th (h)	4 × 400 m relay	3:27.36
2001	Jeux de la Francophonie	Ottawa, Ontario, Canada	2nd	400 m hurdles	56.19
2001	World Championships	Edmonton, Alberta, Canada	11th (sf)	400 m hurdles	55.68
2002	Commonwealth Games	Manchester, United Kingdom	3rd	400 m hurdles	56.13
2002	Commonwealth Games	Manchester, United Kingdom	5th	4 × 400 m relay	3:32.24
