= Stephanie Price (athlete) =

Australian hurdler

Personal information
- Nationality: Australian
- Born: 17 July 1972 (age 54) Sydney, Australia

Sport
- Sport: Track and field
- Event: 400 metres hurdles

Stephanie Price (born 17 July 1972) is an Australian hurdler. She competed in the women's 400 metres hurdles at the 2000 Summer Olympics.
