= Jana Pittman =

Australian hurdler and bobsledder

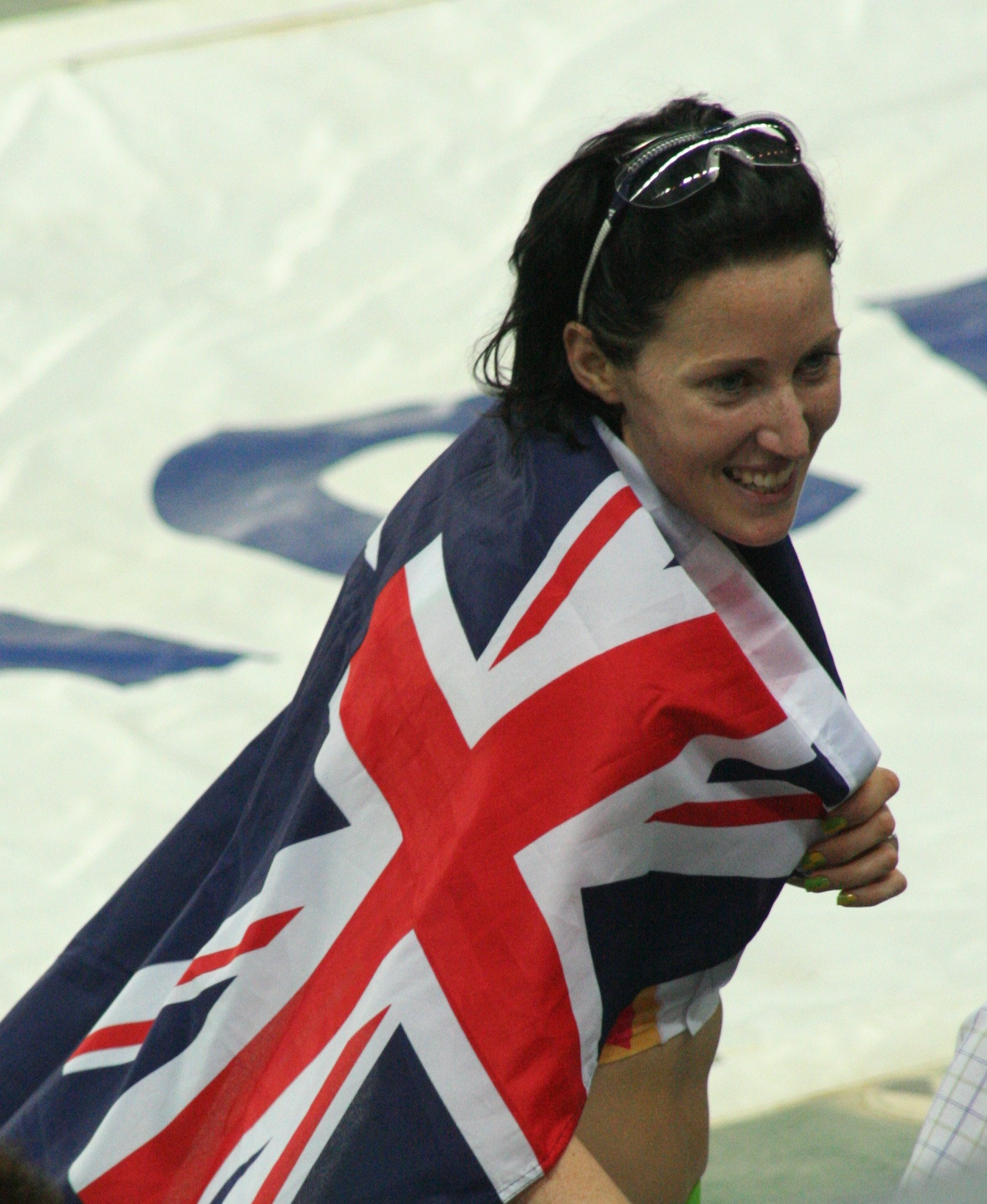
- Pittman at the Osaka World Championships in 2007.

Personal information
- Full name: Jana-Emily Chrysion Pittman
- Nationality: Australian
- Born: 9 November 1982 (age 44) Sydney, Australia
- Education: Western Sydney University (MBBS, grad. 2019)
- Occupations: Athlete; doctor
- Height: 180 cm (5 ft 11 in) (2014)
- Weight: 82 kg (181 lb) (2014)
- Spouses: Chris Rawlinson (m. 2006; div. 2009) (m. 2010; div. 2011) Paul Gatward (m. 2020)
- Life partners: James Gurr (2015–2016); Rajiv Chaudhri (2016–2017)
- Children: 6

Sport
- Sport: Running; Bobsleigh
- Events: 400 metres; 400 metres hurdles; Bobsleigh
Medal record
Women's athletics
Representing Australia
World Championships
| Gold medal – first place | 2003 Paris | 400 m hurdles |
| Gold medal – first place | 2007 Osaka | 400 m hurdles |
Commonwealth Games
| Gold medal – first place | 2002 Manchester | 400 m hurdles |
| Gold medal – first place | 2002 Manchester | 4 × 400 m relay |
| Gold medal – first place | 2006 Melbourne | 400 m hurdles |
| Gold medal – first place | 2006 Melbourne | 4 × 400 m relay |
World Junior Championships
| Gold medal – first place | 2000 Santiago | 400 m |
| Gold medal – first place | 2000 Santiago | 400 m hurdles |
World Youth Championships
| Gold medal – first place | 1999 Bydgoszcz | 400 m hurdles |

Jana Pittman (born 9 November 1982) is an Australian former athlete. During her athletic career Pittman specialised in the 400 metres run and 400-metre hurdles events. She is a two-time world champion in the 400 m hurdles, from 2003 and 2007. She also won the gold medal in this event at the 2002 and 2006 Commonwealth Games and was part of Australia's winning 4 × 400 metres relay teams at both events.

Pittman is one of only eleven athletes (along with Valerie Adams, Usain Bolt, Veronica Campbell-Brown, Armand Duplantis, Jacques Freitag, Yelena Isinbayeva, Kirani James, Faith Kipyegon, Dani Samuels, and David Storl) to win World Championship titles at the youth, junior, and senior levels of an athletic event.

Pittman also competed in the two-woman bobsleigh at the 2014 Winter Olympics, making her the first Australian female athlete to compete in both the Summer and Winter Olympic games.

== Early career ==
Pittman attended Matthew Pearce Primary School, Crestwood High School, Mount St Benedict College and Girraween High School in western Sydney. She is second cousin to diver Melissa Wu. She competed until April 2006 under her maiden name Pittman, then under her married name Rawlinson, and in 2009, following the breakdown of her marriage, as Pittman-Rawlinson.

Pittman won the 400 m hurdles at the 1999 World Youth Championships in Athletics in Bydgoszcz and became treble champion in 200 m, 400 m and 400 m hurdles at the national championships of that year. In 2000, she became the first woman ever to win the 400 m flat and hurdles double at any IAAF or IOC championships – in this case, the 2000 World Junior Championships in Santiago (Chile).

== Knee injury ==
Just before the Athens Olympics, Pittman tore her right meniscus during a warm-up for a track meet in Zurich, where she had been favoured to win the 400 m hurdles event. After undergoing surgery in London only one week before the start of the games, she ran 5th in the final.

== 2006 Commonwealth Games ==
At the Melbourne Commonwealth Games Jana Pittman successfully defended her two Commonwealth titles.

=== 4 × 400 m Relay ===
As at the 2002 Commonwealth Games in Manchester, Pittman-Rawlinson was a member of Australia's gold medal-winning 4 × 400 m relay team (with Tamsyn Lewis, Caitlin Willis and Rosemary Hayward). However, the 2006 Aussie team was awarded the gold medal after the disqualification of the England team for running outside their lane. Pittman later wrote a letter of apology to the English team and offered her gold medal to them. She blamed the disqualification on Lewis who, alongside Pittman, went up to the officials after the race to point out the violation of Englishwoman Natasha Danvers-Smith of taking an incorrect position on the starting leg. According to the ABC Sports Desk the officials were moving to disqualify England anyway. England head coach, Brad McStravick, questioned Pittman's motivation for writing the letter: "I know she is going to spend, well, at least half the year in England and I think some of the girls wondered whether it was just to try and make peace, so that she wouldn't face any animosity once she was living and training in England," he said.

=== 400 m Hurdles ===
Pittman won the 400 m hurdles title with a new Games record time of 53.83 seconds. This was her first major championship in the event since her 2004 knee injury and subsequent stress fractures in her back.

== Osaka 2007 ==
After delivering her first child, Cornelis, Pittman had her wisdom teeth removed and a 10-week injury break with plantar fasciitis. Despite these difficulties, she ran well on the European circuit and comfortably won the 400 m hurdles at the Osaka World Championships.

She carried a slight injury through her 2007 season, having surgery later in the year to remove loose cartilage and floating bone fragments in the second toe of her right foot.

Pittman was pre-selected for the 2008 Australian Olympic team in late 2007.

== Beijing 2008 ==
In January 2008, Pittman was nominated for 'Comeback of the Year' at the Laureus World Sports Awards after winning the World Title in Osaka, within 9 months of giving birth to her son.

In February 2008, Pittman again set her sights on Olympic victory at the Beijing Olympics. But on 9 July 2008, Pittman announced she would not be competing at the Beijing Games, because of the complications with the toe injury. The Australian subsequently reported that a large number of Australians had "viciously turned against the fallen track star", strongly criticising her.

== Injury problems ==
On 29 June 2009, Pittman returned to racing after more than a year with a victory in the Grand Prix event at Málaga, Spain. She won the 400-metre hurdles in a time of 55.67 seconds ahead of Ukrainian Anastasiya Rabchenyuk and Janet Wienand of South Africa. However, she was not fit enough to defend her title at the 2009 World Championships. A hamstring problem caused by bulging disc in her back interrupted her preparation for the tournament, but she was confident of a return, saying "I hope I can recover from this latest setback and get back on track for my long-term goal and dream – winning Olympic Gold in London in 2012".

Another 20 months passed before her return to competition. In April 2011, she beat domestic rival Lauren Boden on the final leg of the Australian Athletics Tour.

Pittman suffered a foot injury in March 2012 which put her out of contention for the London Olympics, and resulted in her deciding to retire from athletics. After trying rowing and boxing, she elected to try her hand at bobsledding, acting as brakewoman to Australian pilot Astrid Radjenovic with a view to competing at the 2014 Winter Olympics. In her first race Radjenovic and Pittman scored Australia's best ever World Cup finish with a seventh place at Altenberg in January 2013.

== 2014 Sochi Winter Olympics ==
In 2014, Pittman competed in the two-person bobsleigh event at the Sochi Winter Olympics. In doing so, she became the first female (and second overall after Paul Narracott) to represent Australia in both the Summer and Winter Olympics. The team of Pittman (brakeman) and Astrid Radjenovic (pilot) finished in 14th position.

== Medical career ==
In January 2013, while training for the Sochi Winter Olympic Games, Pittman began studying medicine at Western Sydney University; she received her medical MBBS degree from this university in 2019.

She is an ambassador for the Australian Cervical Cancer Foundation (ACCF), having been treated for the precancerous condition, cervical intraepithelial neoplasia, in 2014.

== TV appearances ==
Pittman was part of the cast of the second season of SAS Australia in 2021. In November 2021, Pittman was featured in an episode of Australian Story on ABC TV, which was named 'The Last Hurdle'. In 2023, Pittman competed on the seventh season of The Amazing Race Australia with her son, Cornelis.

== Personal life ==
On 31 March 2006, Pittman married English athlete Chris Rawlinson at Morningstar Estate on the Mornington Peninsula, Victoria. Rawlinson, also a specialist 400 m hurdler, coached Jana from 2004 to 2009. On 14 December 2006, she gave birth to the couple's son, Cornelis. She later stated that she had gone for a hard twenty-minute run on the morning of the birth and "felt like a whale". In April 2009, it was announced that Pittman and Rawlinson had separated after three years of marriage and, in May 2009, she returned to training under Craig Hilliard, who had previously coached her. In an interview on 24 October 2009, her new role as a single mother was described as "Jana's toughest hurdle".

In May 2009, it was revealed that Pittman had undergone breast implant surgery after the birth of her son. The following year she announced she'd had the implants removed as they had "affected her running", but would consider having her breasts augmented again once her athletic career was over.

In January 2010, it was announced that Pittman had been reconciled with Rawlinson and that they would renew their vows. On 31 March 2010, Pittman renewed vows with Rawlinson in England, wearing an unconventional red wedding dress. However, on 16 April 2011, it was announced that Pittman and Rawlinson had split again and they divorced.

In 2015, after a cervical cancer scare, Jana decided to use an anonymous sperm donor to conceive her second child, a daughter, while she was dating runner James Gurr.

In 2016, she had her third child, another daughter, using the same donor while studying medicine at the University of Western Sydney. In January 2020, Pittman began working as a junior doctor at Blacktown Hospital in Sydney's west.

In April 2017, Pittman announced her engagement to IT consultant Rajiv Chaudhri.

In May 2020, Pittman revealed she had been with Sydney businessman Paul Gatward for almost six months and that they were expecting their first child together—Pittman's fourth and Gatward's first. They planned to elope in June, and by the time their son was born around November 2020, they had been married just a few months.

In October 2021, Pittman revealed that she and Gatward were expecting twins. On 22 March 2022, Pittman gave birth naturally to a daughter and a son.

Pittman has six children in total.

== Recognition ==
- 2021 - Sport Australia Hall of Fame inductee
