= Irēna Žauna =

Latvian hurdler (born 1981)

Personal information
- Nationality: Latvian
- Born: 16 March 1981 (age 45) Bauska, Latvian SSR, Soviet Union
- Height: 179 cm (5 ft 10 in)
- Weight: 59 kg (130 lb)

Sport
- Sport: Track and field
- Event: 400 metres hurdles

Irēna Žauna (born 16 March 1981) is a Latvian hurdler. She competed in the women's 400 metres hurdles at the 2000 Summer Olympics.
