= Debbie Parris-Thymes =

Jamaican hurdler (born 1973)

Personal information
- Born: 24 March 1973 (age 53) Trelawny Parish, Jamaica

Sport
- Sport: Track and field
- Club: Louisiana State Tigers
Medal record
Women's athletics
Representing Jamaica
World Championships
Gold medal – first place	2001 Edmonton	4 × 400 m relay
Commonwealth Games
Silver medal – second place	2002 Manchester	400 m hurdles
Bronze medal – third place	1994 Victoria	400 m hurdles
Central American and Caribbean Championships
Gold medal – first place	2005 Nassau	400 m hurdles
Silver medal – second place	1993 Cali	400 m hurdles
Central American and Caribbean Games
Silver medal – second place	1998 Maracaibo	4 × 400 m relay
Bronze medal – third place	1998 Maracaibo	400 m hurdles
Summer Universiade
Silver medal – second place	1993 Buffalo	400 m hurdles
CARIFTA Games Junior (U20)
Silver medal – second place	1990 Kingston	100 m hurdles
Bronze medal – third place	1990 Kingston	Long Jump
CARIFTA Games (Under 17s)
Gold medal – first place	1988 Kingston	Long Jump

Debbie-Ann Parris-Thymes (born 24 March 1973) is a Jamaican athlete who mainly competes in the 400 metres hurdles event. She finished 4th in the 1996 Summer Olympics. She has also won medals in relay.

Parris-Thymes ran track collegiately at Louisiana State University and was elected to the Louisiana State University Athletic Hall of Fame in 2017.

== Personal bests ==
- 400 metres - 51.42 (2001)
- 400 metres hurdles - 53.88 (2001)

== Achievements ==
Year	Competition	Venue	Position	Event	Notes
Representing Jamaica
1988	CARIFTA Games (U17)	Kingston, Jamaica	1st	Long jump	5.54 m
1990	CARIFTA Games (U20)	Kingston, Jamaica	2nd	100 m H	14.1
1992	World Junior Championships	Seoul, South Korea	8th	400 m H	60.81
1992	World Junior Championships	Seoul, South Korea	2nd	4 × 400 m	3:32.68
1993	Central American and Caribbean Championships	Cali, Colombia	2nd	400 m H	56.11
1993	Universiade	Buffalo, United States	2nd	400 m H	57.10
1993	World Championships	Stuttgart, Germany	15th (sf)	400 m H	57.83
1994	Commonwealth Games	Victoria, Canada	3rd	400 m H	55.25
1995	World Championships	Gothenburg, Sweden	15th (h)	400 m H	57.83
1996	Olympic Games	Atlanta, United States	4th	400 m H	53.97
1997	World Championships	Athens, Greece	5th	400 m H	54.19
1998	Goodwill Games	Uniondale, United States	2nd	400 m H	54.49
1998	Central American and Caribbean Games	Maracaibo, Venezuela	3rd	400 m H	55.15
1998	Central American and Caribbean Games	Maracaibo, Venezuela	2nd	4 × 400 m	3:30.03
1999	World Championships	Seville, Spain	8th	400 m H	56.24
2001	World Championships	Edmonton, Canada	5th	400 m H	54.68
2001	World Championships	Edmonton, Canada	1st	4 × 400 m	3:20.65
2001	Goodwill Games	Brisbane, Australia	4th	400 m H	56.03
2001	Goodwill Games	Brisbane, Australia	2nd	4 × 400 m	3:24.87
2002	Commonwealth Games	Manchester, United Kingdom	2nd	400 m H	55.24
2003	Pan American Games	Santo Domingo, Dominican Republic	7th	400 m H	56.73
2004	Olympic Games	Athens, Greece	10th (sf)	400 m H	54.99
2005	Central American and Caribbean Championships	Nassau, Bahamas	1st	400 m H	55.26
2005	World Championships	Helsinki, Finland	14th (sf)	400 m H	55.96

== Coaching career ==
Parris-Thymes has been an assistant coach for the LSU Lady Tigers track and field team from 2005–present.
