= Melaine Walker =

Jamaican hurdler

Melaine Walker OD
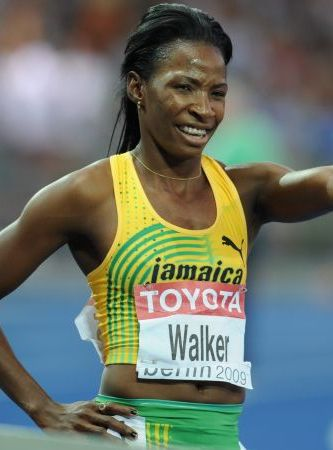
- Walker at the 2009 World Championships

Personal information
- Born: 1 March 1983 (age 43)
- Height: 1.63 m (5 ft 4 in)
- Weight: 53 kg (117 lb)

Sport
- Country: Jamaica
- Sport: Athletics
- Event: 400 m Hurdles
Medal record
Olympic Games
Gold medal – first place	2008 Beijing	400 m hurdles
World Championships
Gold medal – first place	2009 Berlin	400 m hurdles
Silver medal – second place	2011 Daegu	400 m hurdles
World Junior Championships
Silver medal – second place	2000 Santiago	4 × 400 m relay
Silver medal – second place	2002 Kingston	400 m hurdles
Bronze medal – third place	1998 Annecy	4 × 400 m relay
Bronze medal – third place	2000 Santiago	400 m hurdles
World Youth Championships
Silver medal – second place	1999 Bydgoszcz	200 m
Central American and Caribbean Games
Silver medal – second place	2006 Cartagena	4 × 400 m relay
Bronze medal – third place	2006 Cartagena	400 m hurdles
CAC Junior Championships (U20)
Gold medal – first place	2000 San Juan	400 m hurdles
Gold medal – first place	2000 San Juan	4 × 400 m relay
CAC Junior Championships (U17)
Gold medal – first place	1998 George Town	200 m
Gold medal – first place	1998 George Town	4 × 100 m relay
Gold medal – first place	1998 George Town	4 × 400 m relay
CARIFTA Games Junior (U20)
Gold medal – first place	2001 Bridgetown	400 m hurdles
Gold medal – first place	2001 Bridgetown	4 × 100 m relay
Gold medal – first place	2002 Nassau	400 m hurdles
Silver medal – second place	2001 Bridgetown	100 m hurdles
Bronze medal – third place	2002 Nassau	200 m
CARIFTA Games Youth (U17)
Gold medal – first place	1998 Port of Spain	200 m
Gold medal – first place	1999 Fort-de-France	200 m
Gold medal – first place	1999 Fort-de-France	100 m hurdles
Silver medal – second place	1998 Port of Spain	100 m
Bronze medal – third place	1998 Port of Spain	100 m hurdles

Melaine Walker (born 1 March 1983) is a Jamaican 400 metres hurdler. She was born in Kingston. Walker is the former Olympic 400 m hurdles champion. She held the Olympic record of 52.64, set at the 2008 Beijing Olympics, and her time of 52.42 seconds at the 2009 World Championships in Berlin was the second fastest time in history at the time.

== Biography ==
Walker is a past student of the St. Jago High School. Competing for the Texas Longhorns women's track and field team, Walker won the 2005 NCAA Division I Outdoor Track and Field Championships in the 4 × 400 m relay.

She won Gold at the 2008 Beijing Olympics in a new Olympic record time of 52.64 seconds. Walker won the Jamaica national championships in 54.70 seconds, narrowly beating newcomer Kaliese Spencer and qualifying for her first World Championships in Athletics.

On 20 August 2009, she set the second fastest time in history of 52.42 seconds to win the women's 400 m hurdles final at the 2009 World Championships in Berlin. She leapt on the back of the mascot Berlino the Bear to do a victory lap but Berlino crashed into a cart of hurdles and dropped her.

== Achievements ==
Year	Competition	Venue	Position	Event	Notes
Representing Jamaica
1998	World Junior Championships	Annecy, France	5th	200 m	23.72 (wind: -1.1 m/s)
1998	World Junior Championships	Annecy, France	3rd	4 × 100 m relay	44.61
1999	World Youth Championships	Bydgoszcz, Poland	2nd	200 m	23.72 (wind: -0.1 m/s)
1999	World Youth Championships	Bydgoszcz, Poland	6th	100 m hurdles (76.2 cm)	13.80 (wind: -0.4 m/s)
2000	World Junior Championships	Santiago, Chile	3rd	400 m hurdles	56.96
2000	World Junior Championships	Santiago, Chile	2nd	4 × 400 m relay	3:33.99
2002	World Junior Championships	Kingston, Jamaica	5th	100 m hurdles	13.66 w (wind: +3.4 m/s)
2002	World Junior Championships	Kingston, Jamaica	2nd	400 m hurdles	56.03
2004	NACAC U-23 Championships	Sherbrooke, Canada	5th	100 m hurdles	13.86 (wind: +0.0 m/s)
2006	Central American and Caribbean Games	Cartagena, Colombia	3rd	400 m hurdles	55.97
2006	Central American and Caribbean Games	Cartagena, Colombia	2nd	4 × 400 m relay	3:32.86
2007	World Athletics Final	Stuttgart, Germany	3rd	400 m hurdles	54.31
2008	Olympic Games	Beijing, China	1st	400 m hurdles	52.64
2008	World Athletics Final	Stuttgart, Germany	1st	400 m hurdles	54.06
2009	World Championships	Berlin, Germany	1st	400 m hurdles	52.42
2009	IAAF World Athletics Final	Thessaloniki, Greece	1st	400 m hurdles	53.36

=== Personal bests ===
- 60 metres hurdles – 8.05 s (2006, indoor)
- 100 metres hurdles – 12.75 s (2006)
- 400 metres hurdles – 52.42 s (2009)
- 60 metres – 7.40 s (2005, indoor)
- 200 metres – 23.67 s (1998)
- 400 metres – 51.61 s (2008)
