= Lauren Poetschka =

Australian hurdler

Personal information
- Born: 22 October 1974 (age 52) Perth, Western Australia, Australia

Sport
- Sport: Track and field

Lauren Elizabeth Poetschka (born 22 October 1974) is a retired Australian hurdler who specialized in the 400 metres hurdles.

She competed at the 1994 Commonwealth Games, the 1997 Summer Universiade, the 1999 Summer Universiade and the 2000 Summer Olympics.

Her personal best time was 55.37 seconds, achieved in March 2000 in Melbourne.

She is a sister of Olympic sprinter Renee Poetschka.
