= Adrian Hatcher =

Australian javelin thrower

Personal information
- Nationality: Australian
- Born: 6 May 1970 (age 56) Melbourne, Australia

Sport
- Sport: Athletics
- Event: Javelin throw

Adrian Hatcher (born 6 May 1970) is an Australian athlete. He competed in the men's javelin throw at the 2000 Summer Olympics.

Prior to competing internationally, Hatcher was a technician for Telstra.
