= Susan Smith-Walsh =

Irish hurdler (born 1971)

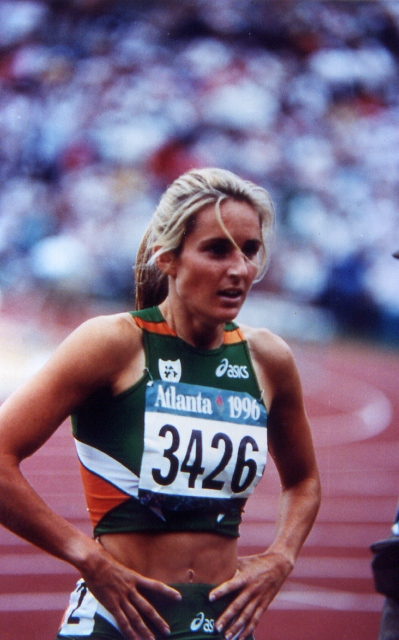
- Susan Smith-Walsh at the 1996 Olympic Games in Atlanta

Personal information
- Born: 14 September 1971 (age 54) Waterford, Ireland
- Height: 1.63 m (5 ft 4 in)
- Weight: 50 kg (110 lb)

Sport
- Country: Ireland
- Sport: Athletics
- Event: 400m Hurdles

Susan Smith-Walsh (born 14 September 1971 in Waterford city, Ireland,) Height 1.64m (5'41/2") Weight 53 kg (116 lbs) is a retired international Irish hurdler and sportsperson. In her senior career she competed in two Olympic Games, two World Championships and one European championship. At the 1997 Athletics World Championships she became the first Irish athlete to ever reach a sprint final at a major event.

Because of her blonde hair and good looks, Smith had been described as the 'Anna Kournikova' of the track.

== Juvenile years ==
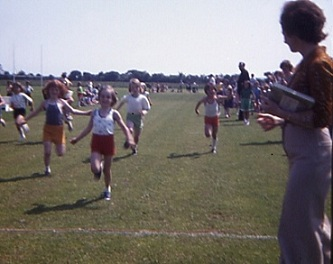
Susan's first-ever race. Winning the St Paul's Parish finals of the Community Games in 1978. She was 6 years old.

She started her career by competing in the Community Games, a competition based on parish communities all over the country. She began running at age 6 and qualified for the Community Games' national finals every year. In 1981 she won her first-ever National medal – in the Community Games national final of the 200m. She had also joined her local athletic club, St Paul's A.C., which competed in competitions organised by the National Federation for young athletes, Bórd Lúth-Cleas Óganach na hÉireann (BLOE,) having her first success with her colleagues on the club's u/11 4 × 100 m relay team. It was to be the first of many.

Her first individual BLOE title came in 1984, at age 13, and she remained unbeaten by any Irish female in hurdles competitions at every level of competition (juvenile, schools, junior and senior) for the rest of her athletic career until she retired in 2000. In schools competition she represented Ireland for three years in succession, captaining the team in 1988. In that same year she captained three Irish teams – in the Four Nations schools international championship, the Celtic Games and the European Catholic Schools Games (FISEC), winning medals in all three.

Susan gained her first senior international vest in 1988 (whilst still only sixteen years old) when she was selected to represent Ireland in the 100m hurdles at Grangemouth, Scotland in a match against Scotland and Iceland where she finished fourth in 14.44secs. She competed in the British Amateur Athletic (AAA) under-age championships winning four medals; one gold, two silver and one bronze. She was the outstanding under-age athlete of her generation and in 1988 she was selected as the Irish juvenile athlete of the year.

When she reached eighteen years of age she was no longer eligible for juvenile competition so she progressed to the oldest senior club in the city, Waterford A.C., for whom she competed until her retirement.

To mark the 30th year of BLOE the Federation held a banquet in February 2000 at which the best athletes from all the 32 counties of Ireland were honoured. To climax the celebrations the Federation named Susan as their Star of Stars – the greatest juvenile athlete in Ireland in the Federation's 30-year history. She was presented with the award by Ireland's Taoiseach.

== Junior career ==
Susan won the 100m hurdles national title each year during her eligibility as a Junior and represented Ireland in the European and World Junior championships. Before the European tests held in Varaždin, Yugoslavia Susan had won the Irish indoor 60m hurdles in an Irish record time and in Varaždin she reached the semi-final of the 100m hurdles where she finished in 5th place, missing the final by one place (see external links below). The World Junior Championships of 1990 were held in Plovdiv, Bulgaria when Susan was in her first year in college. Several months before the Games opened she competed in the Penn Relays and broke the Irish Junior record for the 400m hurdles with 60.26 secs, in only her second run over the distance. At Plovdiv she competed in both hurdles disciplines. She finished in 5th place in the 100mH semi-final missing out on a final appearance, once again, by centimetres. In the semi-final of the 400m hurdles she led the field to the 2nd last hurdle but lost her stride pattern and was overtaken.

== College career ==
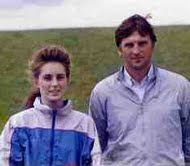
Susan Smith and Yuri Anisimov at a training session in Limerick, 1988

When Susan was still a junior she met with top USSR coach, Yuri Anisimov who had coached his wife, Tatiana, to an Olympic 100mH silver medal in 1976 and who was in Ireland delivering coaching sessions in various locations. He expressed great interest in her and asked her to travel to all those sessions where he could give her in-depth coaching. When he had to return to Russia he asked Susan to consider moving to Leningrad to train under his guidance. He believed that by doing so she would win a European Junior championship gold medal. This placed her in a terrible dilemma because her Leaving Certificate results had gained her a place as a law student in University College Dublin, and she was being recruited by Brown University in Providence, Rhode Island, USA, (one of the top Ivy League Universities). She opted for a University career in the USA.

Her career at Brown went well, although she was disqualified in her first race for a false-start and also lost her first championship race. Her four years there were encapsulated in an article by the associate editor of Brown Alumni Monthly, James Reinbold who wrote "In four years at Brown, Smith won fifteen individual titles – more than any athlete, female or male, in the history of the Heps [Ivy League Colleges plus Army and Navy]. She was named Hep MVP three times and was Brown's female athlete of the year as both a junior and senior. She holds three University records: 55-metre hurdles (indoors), 100-metre hurdles (outdoors), and 400-metre hurdles (outdoors) and she has run on two relay teams that have set school records: the 4x400 (indoors) and the 4x100 (outdoors)." In her final year the track team elected her as captain. Susan graduated in 1993 with two Business degrees. In her last race for the University she finished third in the 400mH at the Eastern Collegiate championship where she recorded 58.31secs, which was then one of the fastest times ever by an Irishwoman and the then sixth fastest time ever achieved on the USA college circuit.

Smith had been remarkably free from injury in her four years at Brown despite competing in a number of events – 100m dash/200m dash/100mH/400mH/4 × 100 m relay/4 × 400 m relay and the Pentathlon – but in her very first race after graduation she broke her foot while competing in the 400mH for Ireland at the Westathletic Games in Sittard, the Netherlands. The injury was to disrupt her senior career and it would be a full three years before she again set foot on a running track to run a competitive race. Susan returned to the US to have an operation on her foot and then to take up a job with Coopers & Lybrand in Boston as a financial analyst/auditor.

== Senior career ==
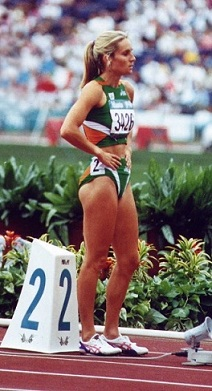
Susan Smith (Ireland) Olympic Games 1996, Atlanta

Although the foot-operation enabled Smith to walk properly, her athletic career appeared to be over because she could not run round a bend without experiencing excruciating pain. The injury persisted for the rest of the 1993 season and for all of 1994 and 1995. Despite consulting numerous doctors a remedy was not found.

With the 1996 Olympic Games in Atlanta approaching she decided to move to Atlanta and, because she needed to prove to the Irish selectors that she could still run championships, she returned home to Ireland and won the National 100m hurdle title (without any training for three years). When she returned to the USA she began a tour of every sports doctor in the region. Finally, an Atlanta-based orthopaedic surgeon decided to re-examine the foot. She received a local anaesthetic and in an operation that lasted all of seven minutes the problem became evident. The operation revealed that a screw that was used to join the broken bone in 1993 had lodged in a tendon, causing the terrible pain. She was then able to start training again. Smith then began a rush to try and qualify for the Olympic Games in the following year, only 11 months hence.

With a new and tougher training regime under coach Loren Seagrave she felt that she could qualify for the upcoming Olympic Games – but needed the opportunity to prove it. With the help of her firm, Coopers & Lybrand she went to South Africa for early season competition and thus began an impressive single-year assault on the Irish record. In the four months between March 1996 and the Olympic Games in July 1996 she set six new Irish records for the 400m hurdles as follows: 56.49secs, Cape Town, 22 Mar '96; 56.14ssecs, Santry, 9 June '96; 56.01secs, Santry, 16 June '96; 55.46secs, Padua ITA, 7 July '96; 55.08secs, Raleigh Durham NC, USA, 14 July '96 and 54.93secs, Atlanta Olympic Games, 29 July '96

In the Olympic Games Smith finished third in the first round and thereby qualified for the semi-final where she finished in 5th position, missing the Olympic final by only one place – but had run another Irish record (See external links, below). Her performances over the year convinced her to become a full-time athlete to enable her to further her career. This was not possible without sponsorship but after discussions with her employers, Coopers & Lybrand, they transferred her to their Dublin office and allowed her to work part-time. The 1997 World Championships were next in her sights and she journeyed to South Africa in January 1997 for warm-weather training. During one of her training sessions she tore a hamstring (an injury that was to come back to haunt her in subsequent years) and two days later she contracted a virus that seriously affected her health. After ten days she returned home and in all lost 14 weeks training. Despite these setbacks the year 1997 was another successful chapter in her career. She competed with great distinction in the Grand Prix season, competing in the Grand Prix finals of both the 400m Hurdles and 100m Hurdles, finishing 5th in the latter in a time of 13.22secs. This was a full half-second faster than the Irish record, but the wind at 2.1 m/s was just over the legal limit. However, she ran superbly in the 1997 World Championships in Athens, finishing 2nd in her heat of the 400m Hurdles in a new Irish record of 54.61secs and then ran fourth in the semi-final to qualify for the final – the first Irish sprinter to achieve this feat. She finished 7th in the final. After her exertions in 1997 she was rewarded by being ranked no.2 in the European 400mH lists.

Her performances during that year also earned her 9th place in the 1998 IAAF World ranking lists, and the American magazine Track and Field News ranked her 10th in the world on her overall season.

She returned to Waterford in August 1997 to get married and then decided to try the life of a full-time athlete. She resigned her position with Coopers and Lybrand and with sponsorship from the Irish Sports Council, the shoe company ASICS and TNT Express Worldwide, she returned to the USA.

In 1998 she started her preparations for the European Athletic Championships scheduled for Budapest. In March she travelled to Tallahassee, Florida for a month of warm weather training. Here she had to abort her training with four stress fractures in her shins resulting in a loss of 11 weeks training. Despite this setback her season went well and she set three new Irish records in the 100m hurdles; 13.58secs in the European Cup as Ireland achieved promotion; 13.31secs in the National Championships and 13.12secs in the National League final. She had captained the Irish team for the European Cup in Lithuania where she also won the 400m hurdles. In the week before the European Championships she set another 400m Hurdles Irish record of 54.31secs and she appeared set for a medal in the championships. She won her semi-final of the 400mH, the first Irish sprinter to ever win a semi-final of a major championship, despite being sick before and after the race. Sickness struck again for the final of the event where she was a disappointing eighth.

In 1999, after a full season of International and Grand Prix competition, she competed in the Seville World Championships where she reached the semi-final stage. Later that year Susan was inducted into the Brown University Hall of Fame. In a biography of Susan the Brown University website summed up her career in Brown thus: "Susan is widely regarded as the greatest women's track and field runner in Brown history and one of the finest women's athletes in the history of Brown athletics."

At the Irish National Championships in 2000 Susan announced that she would be retiring from the sport after the Sydney Olympics. Just four days before her first round race in the Sydney Games she pulled a hamstring during some light training in the Olympic village. She was examined by the Irish medical team who advised her to withdraw from the Games but she insisted that further examinations be sought from the world famous sports therapist Ger Hartmann. He concurred with the decision but the Irish doctors then asked the advice of their British and Australian colleagues. All agreed that she should not run but Smith insisted that she be allowed compete – it was, after all going to be her last race. She received two pain-killing injections, one on the day before her race and another some hours before her race. In addition to Smith's ham-string problem she also suffered a flu-like bug that struck-down both her and another member of the Irish team. Smith finished fourth in her heat, just missing out on a semi-final place. The leg had broken down during the race and she could not take her place on the Irish 4 × 400 m relay team that subsequently set a new Irish record.

== Personal life ==
Susan currently lives in the US with her husband Ryan and their four children.

== Record ==
Her career record is as follows:

NATIONAL SENIOR CHAMPIONSHIP TITLES (13)

100mH (8): 1989, 1990, 1991, 1992, 1995, 1998, 1999, 2000

400mH (5): 1992, 1996, 1997, 1999, 2000

NATIONAL SENIOR RECORD

400mH, 54.31secs, Zurich, SWI, 12 August 1998
