= Martina Stoop =

Swiss hurdler

Personal information
- Nationality: Swiss
- Born: 1 January 1973 (age 53) Aarau, Switzerland

Sport
- Sport: Track and field
- Event: 400 metres hurdles

Martina Stoop (born 1 January 1973) is a Swiss hurdler. She competed in the women's 400 metres hurdles at the 1996 Summer Olympics.
