= Athletics at the 2001 Mediterranean Games =

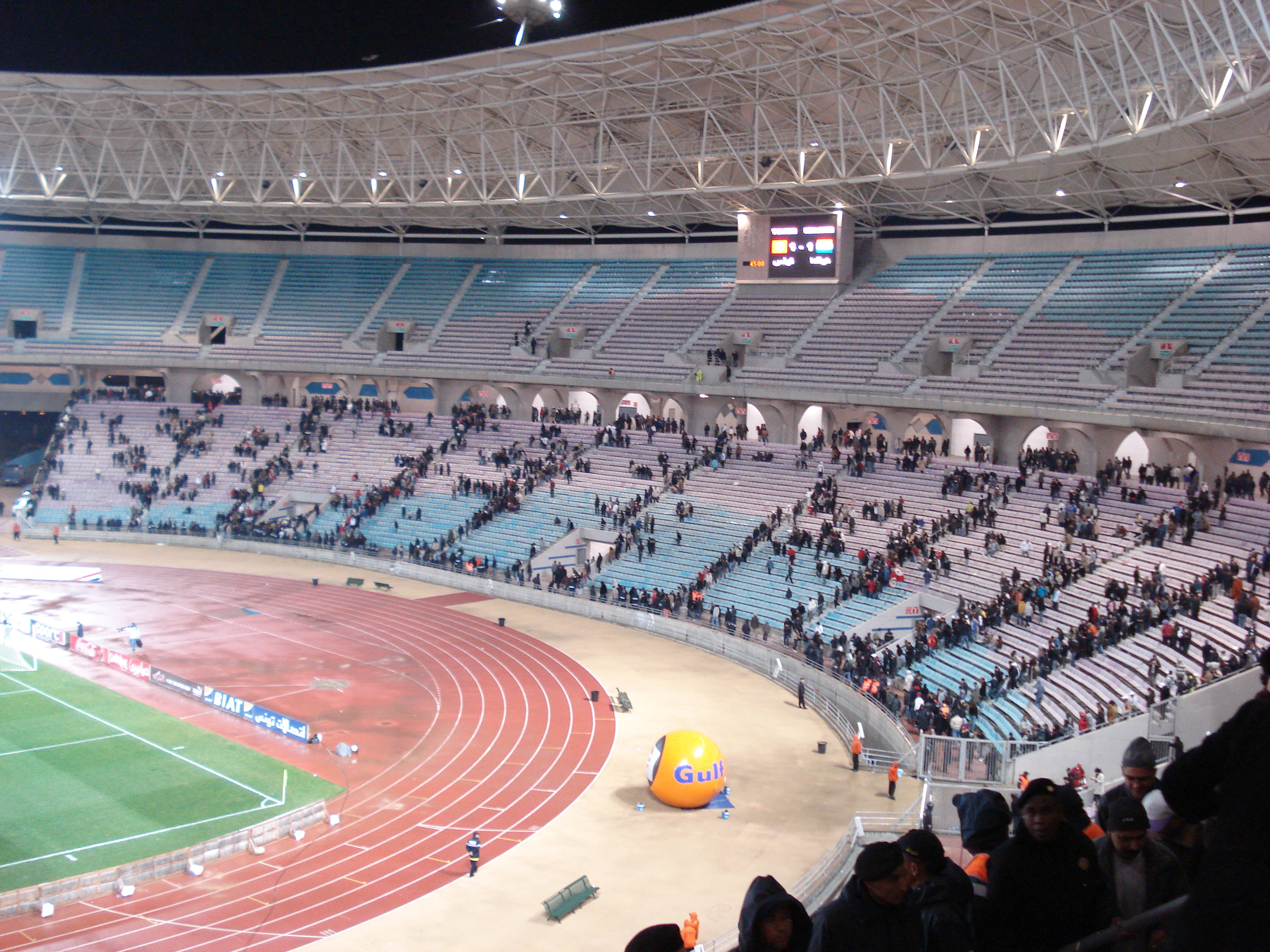
- Radès National Stadium hosted some events
- Dates: 11 – 14 September
- Host city: Radès, Tunisia
- Venue: June 14 Stadium
- Events: 46
- Participation: 438 athletes from 23 nations
- Records set: 10

At the 2001 Mediterranean Games, the athletics events were held in Tunis and Radès in Tunisia from 11 to 14 September 2001. Italy topped the medal table with 9 gold medals and 30 medals in total, shortly followed by France which also had 9 golds but 23 medals overall. Greece had the next greatest medal haul and the host Tunisia won 9 medals, two of which were gold. A total of 10 new Games records were set during the competition.

A total of 46 events were contested, of which 23 by male and 23 by female athletes. This was the first time that the male and female event programmes had reached parity as a number of new events were introduced for women, including: 3000 metres steeplechase, pole vault and hammer throw. Two women's events were modified: the javelin model was changed and the 10 km racewalk was extended to a 20 kilometres racewalk. This was also the final time that marathon races were held at the Mediterranean Games as they were replaced by the half marathon from 2005 onwards.

== Medal table ==
* Host nation (Tunisia)

Rank	Nation	Gold	Silver	Bronze	Total
1	Italy	9	14	7	30
2	France	9	6	8	23
3	Greece	5	6	6	17
4	Algeria	5	3	1	9
5	Turkey	5	2	2	9
6	Morocco	4	5	1	10
7	Spain	4	3	8	15
8	Tunisia*	2	2	5	9
9	Croatia	2	2	1	5
10	Cyprus	1	0	1	2
11	FR Yugoslavia (FR Yugoslavia)	0	2	2	4
12	Slovenia	0	1	1	2
13	Bosnia and Herzegovina	0	0	1	1
13	Egypt	0	0	1	1
13	Libya	0	0	1	1
Totals (15 entries)		46	46	46	138

== Medal summary ==
=== Men ===
Event	Gold		Silver		Bronze	
100 metres Wind: 2.5 m/s	Aristotelis Gavelas (GRE)	10.14w	Maurizio Checcucci (ITA)	10.15w	Anninos Marcoullides (CYP)	10.21w
200 metres	Anninos Marcoullides (CYP)	20.60	Andrea Colombo (ITA)	20.60	Panagiotis Sarris (GRE)	20.72
400 metres	Malik Louahla (ALG)	45.56	Sofiane Labidi (TUN)	46.33	Amin Badany Goma'a (EGY)	46.87
800 metres	Adem Hecini (ALG)	1:49.21	Khalid Tighazouine (MAR)	1:49.42	Franck Barré (FRA)	1:49.48
1500 metres	Abdelkader Hachlaf (MAR)	3:46.45	Mohamed Khaldi (ALG)	3:47.55	Fouad Chouki (FRA)	3:47.97
5000 metres	Mohamed Khaldi (ALG)	14:06.30	Mohammed Amyn (MAR)	14:06.73	Ricardo Fernández (ESP)	14:07.20
10,000 metres	Jaouad Gharib (MAR)	28:58.97	Kamel Kohil (ALG)	29:00.47	Ahmed Baday (MAR)	29:13.36
Marathon	Sergio Chiesa (ITA)	2:21:07	Mustapha Damaoui (MAR)	2:22:25	Ali Mohamed Zaïdi (LBA)	2:22:56
110 metres hurdles	Vincent Clarico (FRA)	13.62	Devis Favaro (ITA)	13.89	Nenad Lončar (YUG)	13.90
400 metres hurdles	Periklis Iakovakis (GRE)	50.21	Darko Juričić (CRO)	50.35	Laurent Ottoz (ITA)	50.75
3000 metres steeplechase	Antonio Jiménez (ESP)	8:31.31	José Luis Blanco (ESP)	8:34.94	Laïd Bessou (ALG)	8:35.32
4×100 metres relay	Italy (ITA); Maurizio Checcucci; Marco Torrieri; Francesco Scuderi; Andrea Colombo	39.14	France (FRA); Yannick Urbino; Thierry Lubin; Alex Menal; Needdy Guims	39.73	Spain (ESP); Cecilio Maestra; Pedro Pablo Nolet; Carlos Meléndez; Carlos Berlanga	40.00
4×400 metres relay	Greece (GRE); Stelios Dimotsios; Ioannis Lessis; Georgios Oikonomidis; Periklis Iakovakis	3:07.28	Algeria (ALG); Malik Louahla; Djamel Belaid; Nabil Salmi; Adem Hecini	3:07.50	France (FRA); Laurent Claudel; Marc Foucan; Philippe Bouche; Bruno Wavelet	3:07.87
20 km walk	Hatem Ghoula (TUN)	1:26:43	José Alejandro Cambil (ESP)	1:28:43	Alessandro Gandellini (ITA)	1:29:18
High jump	Abderrahmane Hammad (ALG)	2.25 m	Giulio Ciotti (ITA)	2.19 m	Elvir Krehmić (BIH)	2.19 m
Pole vault	Andrea Giannini (ITA)	5.45 m	Giuseppe Gibilisco (ITA)	5.40 m	Khalid Lachheb (FRA)	5.40 m
Long jump	Siniša Ergotić (CRO)	8.08 m	Younès Moudrik (MAR)	8.07 m (w)	Nicola Trentin (ITA)	7.93 m (w)
Triple jump	Fabrizio Donato (ITA)	17.05 m	Sébastien Pincemail (FRA)	16.58 m (w)	Raúl Chapado (ESP)	16.41 m (w)
Shot put	Manuel Martínez (ESP)	21.03 m GR	Paolo Dal Soglio (ITA)	20.60 m	Vaios Tigas (GRE)	19.42 m
Discus throw	Diego Fortuna (ITA)	64.40 m GR	David Martínez (ESP)	63.85 m	Mario Pestano (ESP)	63.71 m
Hammer throw	Nicola Vizzoni (ITA)	78.49 m GR	Alexandros Papadimitriou (GRE)	76.98 m	Raphaël Piolanti (FRA)	71.52 m
Javelin throw	Laurent Dorique (FRA)	80.88 m	Eleutherios Karasmanakis (GRE)	77.58 m	Edi Ponoš (CRO)	76.12 m
Decathlon	Prodromos Korkizoglou (GRE)	7773 pts	Hamdi Dhouibi (TUN)	7530 pts	Paolo Casarsa (ITA)	7522 pts

=== Women ===
Event	Gold		Silver		Bronze	
100 metres	Nora Güner (TUR)	11.25	Manuela Levorato (ITA)	11.25	Evfrosyni Patsou (GRE)	11.45
200 metres Wind: 2.6 m/s	Nora Güner (TUR)	22.86 w	Fabé Dia (FRA)	23.18 w	Anita Mormand (FRA)	23.50 w
400 metres	Marie-Louise Bévis (FRA)	52.90	Francine Landre (FRA)	52.96	Awatef Ben Hassine (TUN)	53.77
800 metres	Seltana Aït Hammou (MAR)	2:04.28	Brigita Langerholc (SLO)	2:04.91	Abir Nakhli (TUN)	2:04.98
1500 metres	Fatma Lanouar (TUN)	4:10.33	Süreyya Ayhan (TUR)	4:10.69	Ebru Kavaklıoğlu (TUR)	4:12.03
5000 metres	Ebru Kavaklıoğlu (TUR)	15:26.33	Asmae Leghzaoui (MAR)	15:29.35	Olivera Jevtić (YUG)	15:40.61
10,000 metres	Asmae Leghzaoui (MAR)	31:16.94 GR	Olivera Jevtić (YUG)	31:33.08	Elvan Abeylegesse (TUR)	32:29.20
Marathon	Mehtap Sizmaz (TUR)	2:40:49	Serap Aktaş (TUR)	2:43:18	Sonia Agoun (TUN)	2:46:03
100 metres hurdles	Patricia Girard (FRA)	12.82 GR	Haïdy Aron (FRA)	13.04	Margaret Macchiut (ITA)	13.31
400 metres hurdles	Sylvanie Morandais (FRA)	57.02	Monika Niederstätter (ITA)	57.22	Meta Mačus (SLO)	57.51
3000 metres steeplechase	Élodie Olivarès (FRA)	9:44.68 GR	Laurence Duquénoy (FRA)	10:05.90	Hana Chaouach (TUN)	10:18.31
4×100 metres relay	France (FRA); Haïdy Aron; Céline Thelamon; Fabé Dia; Sylvie Mballa Éloundou	44.40	Italy (ITA); Anita Pistone; Francesca Cola; Manuela Grillo; Danielle Perpoli	44.89	Greece (GRE); Athina Kopsia; Evfrosyni Patsou; Olga Kaidantzi; Ioanna Kafetzi	44.97
4×400 metres relay	France (FRA); Anita Mormand; Viviane Dorsile; Marie-Louise Bévis; Francine Landre	3:34.28	Italy (ITA); Daniela Reina; Fabiola Piroddi; Francesca Carbone; Danielle Perpoli	3:38.90	Greece (GRE); Georgia Koumnaki; Hristina Hantzi-Neag; Paraskevi Tsapara; Chrysoula Goudenoudi	3:42.22
20 km walk	Erica Alfridi (ITA)	1:36:47 GR	Elisabetta Perrone (ITA)	1:36:47	Rocío Florido (ESP)	1:37:14
High jump	Blanka Vlašić (CRO)	1.90 m	Nevena Lenđel (CRO)	1.87 m	Anna Visigalli (ITA)	1.87 m
Pole vault	Dana Cervantes (ESP)	4.10 m GR	Thaila Iakovidou (GRE)	4.00 m	Marie Poissonnier (FRA)	3.90 m
Long jump	Concepción Montaner (ESP)	6.48 m	Stiliani Pilatou (GRE)	6.41 m	Silvia Favre (ITA)	6.14 m
Triple jump	Baya Rahouli (ALG)	14.30 m (w)	Marija Martinović (YUG)	13.97 m (w)	Carlota Castrejana (ESP)	13.72 m (w)
Shot put	Assunta Legnante (ITA)	17.23 m	Irini Terzoglou (GRE)	16.97 m	Martina de la Puente (ESP)	16.55 m
Discus throw	Areti Abatzi (GRE)	61.42 m	Agnese Maffeis (ITA)	57.38 m	Monia Kari (TUN)	56.44 m
Hammer throw	Florence Ezeh (FRA)	64.59 m GR	Ester Balassini (ITA)	64.13 m	Alexandra Papageorgiou (GRE)	62.87 m
Javelin throw	Claudia Coslovich (ITA)	62.02 m GR	Aggeliki Tsiolakoudi (GRE)	58.16 m	Marta Míguez (ESP)	55.19 m
Heptathlon	Anzhela Atroshchenko (TUR)	5833 pts	Gertrud Bacher (ITA)	5764 pts	Julie Mézerette (FRA)	5670 pts

== Participation ==
- Albania (2)
- Algeria (21)
- Andorra (3)
- Bosnia and Herzegovina (2)
- Croatia (16)
- Cyprus (25)
- Egypt (8)
- France (54)
- Greece (63)
- Italy (63)
- Jordan (3)
- Libya (5)
- Lebanon (6)
- Malta (7)
- Morocco (21)
- Monaco (1)
- San Marino (3)
- Slovenia (13)
- Spain (54)
- Syria (5)
- Tunisia (39)
- Turkey (16)
- Yugoslavia (8)

== Records ==
Name	Event	Country	Record	Type
Men's events
Manuel Martínez	Shot put	Spain	21.03 m	GR
Diego Fortuna	Discus throw	Italy	64.40 m	GR
Nicola Vizzoni	Hammer throw	Italy	78.49 m	GR
Women's events
Asmae Leghzaoui	10,000 metres	Morocco	31:16.94	GR
Élodie Olivarès	3000 metres steeplechase*	France	9:44.68	GR
Patricia Girard	100 metres hurdles	France	12.82	GR
Dana Cervantes	Pole vault*	Spain	4.10	GR
Florence Ezeh	Hammer throw*	France	64.59	GR
Claudia Coslovich	Javelin throw*	Italy	62.02	GR
Erica Alfridi	20 kilometres race walk*	Italy	1:36:47	GR
Key: WR — World record • AR — Area record • GR — Games record • NR — National record

- * = New event or model

== Men's results ==
=== 100 meters ===
Heats – September 11
Wind:
Heat 1: +2.4 m/s, Heat 2: +2.0 m/s, Heat 3: +3.5 m/s

Rank	Heat	Name	Nationality	Time	Notes
1	3	Maurizio Checcucci	Italy	10.09	
2	2	Aristotelis Gavelas	Greece	10.14	
3	1	Anninos Marcoullides	Cyprus	10.18	
4	3	Matic Osovnikar	Slovenia	10.21	
5	2	Dejan Vojnović	Croatia	10.25	
5	1	Francesco Scuderi	Italy	10.25	
7	3	Igor Blažević	Croatia	10.30	
8	3	Alexandros Kontzos	Greece	10.34	
9	2	Yannick Urbino	France	10.40	
10		Needdy Guims	France	10.42	
11	2	Mansour Noubigh	Tunisia	10.49	
12	1	Reşat Oğuz	Turkey	10.53	
13	1	Carlos Berlanga	Spain	10.55	
14	2	Rachid Chouhal	Malta	10.58	
15	2	Cecilio Maestra	Spain	10.62	
16		Mario Bonello	Malta	10.78	
17		Themis Rotos	Cyprus	10.79	
18		Gian Nicola Berardi	San Marino	10.84	
19		Fawzi Ali	Libya	10.99	

Final – September 11

Wind: +2.5 m/s

Rank	Name	Nationality	Time	Notes
1st place, gold medalist(s)	Aristotelis Gavelas	Greece	10.14	
2nd place, silver medalist(s)	Maurizio Checcucci	Italy	10.15	
3rd place, bronze medalist(s)	Anninos Marcoullides	Cyprus	10.21	
4	Francesco Scuderi	Italy	10.22	
5	Dejan Vojnović	Croatia	10.27	
6	Matic Osovnikar	Slovenia	10.32	
7	Igor Blažević	Croatia	10.44	
8	Alexandros Kontzos	Greece	10.51	

=== 200 meters ===
Heats – September 13
Wind:
Heat 1: -1.5, Heat 2: +2.0 m/s, Heat 3: 0.0 m/s

Rank	Heat	Name	Nationality	Time	Notes
1	2	Prodromos Katsantonis	Cyprus	20.96	
2	3	Anninos Marcoullides	Cyprus	20.99	
3		Panagiotis Sarris	Greece	21.04	
4		Andrea Colombo	Italy	21.12	
5		Marco Torrieri	Italy	21.38	
6	3	Pedro Pablo Nolet	Spain	21.41	
7		Reşat Oğuz	Turkey	21.45	
8	2	Carlos Meléndez	Spain	21.46	
9		Ronald Pognon	France	21.47	
10		Thierry Lubin	France	21.48	
11	1	Anastasios Poulioglou	Greece	21.49	
12		Nabil Jabir	Morocco	21.70	
13		Mohamed Nhili	Morocco	21.88	
14		Abubaker El Tawerghi	Libya	21.94	
15		Mario Bonello	Malta	22.02	
16		Laroussi Titi	Tunisia	22.12	
17		Darren Gilford	Malta	22.33	
		Sofiane Labidi	Tunisia	DNS	

Final – September 13
Wind:
+1.4 m/s

Rank	Lane	Name	Nationality	Time	Notes
1st place, gold medalist(s)	4	Anninos Marcoullides	Cyprus	20.60	CR
2nd place, silver medalist(s)	7	Andrea Colombo	Italy	20.60	
3rd place, bronze medalist(s)	6	Panagiotis Sarris	Greece	20.72	
4	3	Marco Torrieri	Italy	20.74	
5	4	Prodromos Katsantonis	Cyprus	20.85	
6	2	Thierry Lubin	France	21.17	
7	8	Pedro Pablo Nolet	Spain	21.28	
8	1	Reşat Oğuz	Turkey	21.34	

=== 400 meters ===
Heats – September 12

Rank	Heat	Name	Nationality	Time	Notes
1		Malik Louhala	Algeria	47.08	
2		Sofiane Labidi	Tunisia	47.37	
3		Amin Badany Goma'a	Egypt	47.52	
4		Andrea Barberi	Italy	47.76	
5		Stylianos Dimotsios	Greece	47.83	
6	1	Salvador Rodríguez	Spain	47.97	
7		Frano Bakarić	Croatia	48.09	
8		Nino Habun	Croatia	48.17	
9		Nabil Jabir	Morocco	48.27	
10		Georgios Oikonomidis	Greece	48.29	
11		Marc Foucan	France	48.35	
12		Ashraf Saber	Italy	48.75	
13		Djamel Belaid	Algeria	49.09	
14		Laroussi Titi	Tunisia	50.87	
		Mohamed Amin Othon	Syria	DNF	
		Marc Raquil	France	DNS	

Final – September 12

Rank	Lane	Name	Nationality	Time	Notes
1st place, gold medalist(s)	3	Malik Louhala	Algeria	45.56	
2nd place, silver medalist(s)	5	Sofiane Labidi	Tunisia	46.33	
3rd place, bronze medalist(s)	6	Amin Badany Goma'a	Egypt	46.87	
4	4	Stylianos Dimotsios	Greece	47.29	
5	1	Salvador Rodríguez	Spain	47.39	
6	2	Frano Bakarić	Croatia	47.50	
7	8	Andrea Barberi	Italy	47.65	
8	7	Nino Habun	Croatia	48.47	

=== 800 meters ===
Heats – September 11

Rank	Heat	Name	Nationality	Time	Notes
1		Khalid Tighazouine	Morocco	1:49.10	
2	2	Juan Carlos Esteso	Spain	1:49.59	
3		Radwan Jaddoueh	Syria	1:49.62	
4		Franck Barré	France	1:49.67	
5		Andrea Giocondi	Italy	1:49.97	
6	2	Hamza Abdenouz	Algeria	1:50.08	
7		Adem Hecini	Algeria	1:51.53	
8		Nicolas Aissat	France	1:51.67	
9		Amor Rached	Tunisia	1:52.02	
10		Mouhssin Chehibi	Morocco	1:52.04	
11		Pavlos Faroungias	Greece	1:52.33	
12		Mohamed Bel Hadj	Tunisia	1:52.45	
13		Abubaker El Gatroni	Libya	1:52.89	
14		Ziad Aoun	Lebanon	1:55.33	

Final – September 12

Rank	Name	Nationality	Time	Notes
1st place, gold medalist(s)	Adem Hecini	Algeria	1:49.21	
2nd place, silver medalist(s)	Khalid Tighazouine	Morocco	1:49.42	
3rd place, bronze medalist(s)	Franck Barré	France	1:49.48	
4	Juan Carlos Esteso	Spain	1:49.64	
5	Mouhssin Chehibi	Morocco	1:49.84	
6	Nicolas Aissat	France	1:50.51	
7	Andrea Giocondi	Italy	1:50.67	
8	Radwan Jaddoueh	Syria	1:51.39	

=== 1500 meters ===
September 14

Rank	Name	Nationality	Time	Notes
1st place, gold medalist(s)	Abdelkader Hachlaf	Morocco	3:46.45	
2nd place, silver medalist(s)	Mohamed Khaldi	Algeria	3:47.55	
3rd place, bronze medalist(s)	Fouad Chouki	France	3:47.97	
4	Darko Radomirović	Yugoslavia	3:49.02	
5	Panagiotis Stroumpakos	Greece	3:49.23	
6	Tarek Boukensa	Algeria	3:49.78	
7	Lorenzo Perrone	Italy	3:51.60	
8	Pedro Antonio Esteso	Spain	3:51.86	
9	Ali Hakimi	Tunisia	3:52.43	
10	Ruben Villarroya	Spain	3:53.60	
11	Nadir Bosch	France	3:55.79	
12	Christian Obrist	Italy	3:56.13	
13	Rached Amor	Tunisia	3:58.92	
14	Ziad Aoun	Lebanon	4:01.76	
	Salah El Ghazi	Morocco	DNS	

=== 5000 meters ===
September 11

Rank	Name	Nationality	Time	Notes
1st place, gold medalist(s)	Mohamed Khaldi	Algeria	14:06.30	
2nd place, silver medalist(s)	Mohammed Amyn	Morocco	14:06.73	
3rd place, bronze medalist(s)	Ricardo Fernández	Spain	14:07.20	
4	Iván Hierro	Spain	14:07.56	
5	Salvatore Vincenti	Italy	14:09.39	
6	Khoudir Aggoune	Algeria	14:10.08	
7	Mustapha Essaïd	France	14:12.76	
8	Simone Zanon	Italy	14:13.90	
9	Rachid Chékhémani	France	14:16.99	
10	Ridha Amri	Tunisia	14:19.92	
11	Hedi Khalfallah	Tunisia	14:23.52	
12	Anastasios Frangos	Greece	14:38.71	
13	Mohammad Kafraini	Jordan	14:39.78	
14	Antoni Bernadó	Andorra	14:51.62	
	Abderrahim Goumri	Morocco	DNS	

=== 10,000 meters ===
September 14

Rank	Name	Nationality	Time	Notes
1st place, gold medalist(s)	Jaouad Gharib	Morocco	28:58.97	
2nd place, silver medalist(s)	Kamal Kohil	Algeria	29:00.47	
3rd place, bronze medalist(s)	Ahmed Baday	Morocco	29:13.36	
4	Marco Mazza	Italy	29:38.22	
5	Panagiotis Charamis	Greece	30:09.59	
6	Antonios Papantonis	Greece	30:11.06	
7	Ahmed Issaoui	Tunisia	30:47.95	
8	Antoni Bernadó	Andorra	30:54.84	
	Samir Moussaoui	Algeria	DNF	
	Hedi Khalfallah	Tunisia	DNS	
	Alberto Álvarez	Spain	DNS	

=== Marathon ===
September 11

Rank	Name	Nationality	Time	Notes
1st place, gold medalist(s)	Sergio Chiesa	Italy	2:21:07	
2nd place, silver medalist(s)	El Mostafa Damaoui	Morocco	2:22:25	
3rd place, bronze medalist(s)	Ali Mabrouk El Zaidi	Libya	2:22:56	
4	Ahmed Soliman	Egypt	2:23:49	
5	Azzedine Sakhri	Algeria	2:24:58	
6	Nicola Ciavarella	Italy	2:25:41	
7	Mohamed Sakri	Tunisia	2:29:16	
8	Mounir El Ouardi	Morocco	2:29:56	
9	Gian Luigi Macina	San Marino	2:35:36	
10	Dimitrios Panagiotou	Cyprus	2:38:39	
	Boubker El Afoui	Morocco	DNF	

=== 110 meters hurdles ===
Heats – September 12
Wind:
Heat 1: +2.2 m/s, Heat 2: +4.5 m/s

Rank	Heat	Name	Nationality	Time	Notes
1	1	Vincent Clarico	France	13.65	Q
1	1	Damjan Zlatnar	Slovenia	13.83	Q
3	1	Nenad Lončar	Yugoslavia	13.91	Q
4	1	Jurica Grabušić	Croatia	13.97	q
5	1	Javier Vega	Spain	14.16	
6	1	Stefanos Ioannou	Cyprus	14.38	
1	2	Dimitrios Pietris	Greece	13.70	Q
2	2	Devis Favaro	Italy	13.83	Q
3	2	Cédric Lavanne	France	13.88	Q
4	2	Ioannis Marakakis	Greece	14.09	q
5	2	Zoran Miljuš	Croatia	14.09	
6	2	Hamdi Mhirsi	Tunisia	14.40	
	?	Raeia Wesam Khraisat	Jordan	14.67	
	?	Ezzedine Abdurrahman	Libya	14.84	

Final – September 12
Wind:
0.0 m/s

Rank	Lane	Name	Nationality	Time	Notes
1st place, gold medalist(s)	6	Vincent Clarico	France	13.62	
2nd place, silver medalist(s)	3	Devis Favaro	Italy	13.89	
3rd place, bronze medalist(s)	2	Nenad Lončar	Yugoslavia	13.90	
4	4	Dimitrios Pietris	Greece	13.91	
5	8	Cédric Lavanne	France	13.95	
6	1	Jurica Grabušić	Croatia	13.97	
7	5	Damjan Zlatnar	Slovenia	13.99	
	7	Ioannis Marakakis	Greece	DNF	

=== 400 meters hurdles ===
Heats – September 11

Rank	Heat	Name	Nationality	Time	Notes
1		Periklis Iakovakis	Greece	51.50	
2		Hani Mourhej	Syria	51.60	
3		Laurent Ottoz	Italy	51.71	
4		Kamel Tabbal	Tunisia	51.78	
5		Jean-Laurent Heusse	France	51.79	
6		Darko Juričić	Croatia	51.81	
7	2	José María Romera	Spain	51.81	
8		Costas Pochanis	Cyprus	51.92	
9	1	Jaime Juan	Spain	51.93	
9		Giorgio Frinolli	Italy	51.93	
11	2	Nabil Salmi	Algeria	52.01	
12		Laurent Claudel	France	52.62	
13		Zaher Al Din Al-Najem	Syria	53.65	
		Mustapha Sdad	Morocco	DNS	
		Damjan Zlatnar	Slovenia	DNS	
		Héni Kechi	Tunisia	DNS	

Final – September 11

Rank	Lane	Name	Nationality	Time	Notes
1st place, gold medalist(s)	3	Periklis Iakovakis	Greece	50.21	
2nd place, silver medalist(s)	7	Darko Juričić	Croatia	50.35	
3rd place, bronze medalist(s)	6	Laurent Ottoz	Italy	50.75	
4	4	Kamel Tabbal	Tunisia	50.76	
5	5	Hani Mourhej	Syria	50.95	
6	8	José María Romera	Spain	51.32	
7	1	Jean-Laurent Heusse	France	51.52	
8	2	Costas Pochanis	Cyprus	51.56	

=== 3000 meters steeplechase ===
September 12

Rank	Name	Nationality	Time	Notes
1st place, gold medalist(s)	Antonio David Jiménez	Spain	8:31.31	
2nd place, silver medalist(s)	José Luis Blanco	Spain	8:34.94	
3rd place, bronze medalist(s)	Laïd Bessou	Algeria	8:35.32	
4	Mourad Benslimani	Algeria	8:37.25	
5	Elarbi Khattabi	Morocco	8:38.36	
6	Lotfi Turki	Tunisia	8:41.87	
7	Lyes Ramoul	France	8:47.08	
8	Luciano Di Pardo	Italy	8:49.25	
9	Stéphane Desaulty	France	8:53.38	
10	Josep Sansa	Andorra	8:54.02	
11	Georgios Kompogiannis	Greece	9:03.38	
	Brahim Boulami	Morocco	DNS	

=== 4 × 100 meters relay ===
September 13

Rank	Nation	Competitors	Time	Notes
1st place, gold medalist(s)	Italy	Maurizio Checcucci, Marco Torrieri, Francesco Scuderi, Andrea Colombo	39.14	
2nd place, silver medalist(s)	France	Yannick Urbino, Thierry Lubin, Alex Menal, Needdy Guims	39.73	
3rd place, bronze medalist(s)	Spain	Cecilio Maestra, Pedro Pablo Nolet, Carlos Meléndez, Carlos Berlanga	40.00	
4	Greece	Panagiotis Sarris, Aristotelis Gavelas, Georgios Panagiotopoulos, Alexandros Kontzos	40.22	
5	Cyprus	Themis Rotos, Anninos Marcoullides, Prodromos Katsantonis, Stefanos Ioannou	40.51	

=== 4 × 400 meters relay ===
September 14

Rank	Nation	Competitors	Time	Notes
1st place, gold medalist(s)	Greece	Stylianos Dimotsios, Ioannis Lessis, Georgios Oikonomidis, Periklis Iakovakis	3:07.28	
2nd place, silver medalist(s)	Algeria	Malik Louhala, Djamel Belaid, Nabil Salmi, Adem Hecini	3:07.50	
3rd place, bronze medalist(s)	France	Laurent Claudel, Marc Foucan, Philippe Bouche, Bruno Wavelet	3:07.87	
4	Croatia	Elvis Peršić, Frano Bakarić, Nino Habun, Darko Juričić	3:08.03	
5	Spain	José María Romera, Salvador Rodríguez, Jaime Juan, Antonio Manuel Reina	3:08.24	
6	Italy	Laurent Ottoz, Luca Galletti, Ashraf Saber, Andrea Barberi	3:11.53	
7	Tunisia	Hamdi Dhouibi, Sofiane Labidi, Kamel Tabbal, Laroussi Titi	3:13.23	
8	Syria	Mohamed Amin Othon, Zaher Al Din Al-Najem, Radwan Jaddoueh, Hani Mourhej	3:15.29	

=== 20 kilometers walk ===
September 12

Rank	Name	Nationality	Time	Notes
1st place, gold medalist(s)	Hatem Ghoula	Tunisia	1:26:43	
2nd place, silver medalist(s)	José Alejandro Cambil	Spain	1:28:43	
3rd place, bronze medalist(s)	Alessandro Gandellini	Italy	1:29:18	
4	Theodoros Stamatopoulos	Greece	1:29:52	
5	Moussa Aouanouk	Algeria	1:31:20	
6	Elefthérios Thanópoulos	Greece	1:31:36	
7	Ivano Brugnetti	Italy	1:33:03	
	Aleksandar Raković	Yugoslavia	DQ	

=== High jump ===
September 13

Rank	Name	Nationality	2.05	2.10	2.15	2.19	2.22	2.25	2.30	Result	Notes
1st place, gold medalist(s)	Abderrahmane Hammad	Algeria	–	–	o	o	o	o	xxx	2.25	
2nd place, silver medalist(s)	Giulio Ciotti	Italy								2.19	
3rd place, bronze medalist(s)	Elvir Krehmić	Bosnia and Herzegovina								2.19	
3rd place, bronze medalist(s)	Grégory Gabella	France								2.19	
5	Rožle Prezelj	Slovenia								2.19	
6	Metin Durmuşoğlu	Turkey								2.15	
6	David Antona	Spain	o	–	o	–	xxx			2.15	
8	Dimitrios Syrrakos	Greece								2.15	
9	Georgios Mitrakos	Greece								2.10	
9	Đorđe Miketić	Yugoslavia								2.10	
11	Ioannis Constantinou	Cyprus								2.10	
11	Mustapha Raifak	France								2.10	
13	Raúl Lozano	Spain	o	xxo	xxx					2.10	

=== Pole vault ===
September 14

Rank	Name	Nationality	4.90	5.05	5.20	5.30	5.40	5.45	Result	Notes
1st place, gold medalist(s)	Andrea Giannini	Italy	–	–	–	xo	–	xo	5.45	
2nd place, silver medalist(s)	Giuseppe Gibilisco	Italy							5.40	
3rd place, bronze medalist(s)	Khalid Lachheb	France							5.40	
4	Fotis Stefani	Cyprus							5.30	
5	Filippos Sgouros	Greece							5.20	
6	Béchir Zaghouani	Tunisia							5.05	
7	Jurij Rovan	Slovenia							5.05	
	Marios Evangelou	Greece							NM	

=== Long jump ===
Qualification – September 12

Rank	Group	Name	Nationality	#1	#2	#3	Result	Notes
1		Kader Klouchi	France				7.95	
2		Younès Moudrik	Morocco				7.93	
3		Siniša Ergotić	Croatia				7.89	
4		Yahya Berrabah	Morocco				7.77	
5		Danial Jahić	Yugoslavia				7.74	
6		Nicola Trentin	Italy				7.72	
7	B	Raúl Fernández	Spain	7.70w			7.70w	
8		Alessio Rimoldi	Italy				7.61	
9		Cheikh Touré	France				7.55	
10		Anis Gallali	Tunisia				7.52	
11		Stergios Nousios	Greece				7.50	
12		Luka Aračić	Croatia				7.48	
13	A	Antonio Adsuar	Spain	7.35w	x	7.47	7.47	
14		Rachid Chouhal	Malta				7.34	
15		Konstadinos Papadopoulos	Greece				7.03	
		Gregor Cankar	Slovenia				NM	

Final – September 12

Rank	Name	Nationality	#1	#2	#3	#4	#5	#6	Result	Notes
1st place, gold medalist(s)	Siniša Ergotić	Croatia							8.08	
2nd place, silver medalist(s)	Younès Moudrik	Morocco							8.07w	
3rd place, bronze medalist(s)	Nicola Trentin	Italy							7.93w	
4	Danial Jahić	Yugoslavia							7.91w	
5	Kader Klouchi	France							7.91	
6	Cheikh Touré	France							7.76	
7	Luka Aračić	Croatia							7.70w	
8	Stergios Nousios	Greece							7.67	
9	Raúl Fernández	Spain	x	7.61w	x				7.61w	
10	Alessio Rimoldi	Italy							7.48w	
11	Yahya Berrabah	Morocco							7.45w	
12	Anis Gallali	Tunisia							7.39w	

=== Triple jump ===
September 11

Rank	Name	Nationality	#1	#2	#3	#4	#5	#6	Result	Notes
1st place, gold medalist(s)	Fabrizio Donato	Italy	16.87	16.89	17.05				17.05	
2nd place, silver medalist(s)	Sébastien Pincemail	France							16.58w	
3rd place, bronze medalist(s)	Raúl Chapado	Spain	15.74w	x	x	15.84	16.41w	16.09	16.41w	
4	Boštjan Šimunič	Slovenia							16.34w	
5	Karl Taillepierre	France							16.00	
6	Abdallah Machraoui	Tunisia							15.40	
7	Stelios Kapsalis	Cyprus							15.30	

=== Shot put ===
September 13

Rank	Name	Nationality	#1	#2	#3	#4	#5	#6	Result	Notes
1st place, gold medalist(s)	Manuel Martínez	Spain	20.28	x	20.04	20.46	21.03	20.48	21.03	GR
2nd place, silver medalist(s)	Paolo Dal Soglio	Italy							20.60	
3rd place, bronze medalist(s)	Vaios Tigkas	Greece							19.42	
4	Marco Dodoni	Italy							18.63	
5	Yves Niaré	France							18.13	
6	Edhem Kacević	Bosnia and Herzegovina							17.57	
7	Hicham Aït Aha	Morocco							16.56	
8	Mohamed Meddeb	Tunisia							16.12	

=== Discus throw ===
September 12

Rank	Name	Nationality	#1	#2	#3	#4	#5	#6	Result	Notes
1st place, gold medalist(s)	Diego Fortuna	Italy							64.40	GR
2nd place, silver medalist(s)	David Martínez	Spain	60.14	62.14	61.44	62.65	x	63.85	63.85	
3rd place, bronze medalist(s)	Mario Pestano	Spain	60.27	63.71	63.33	62.85	58.44	x	63.71	
4	Savvas Panavoglou	Greece							61.49	
5	Igor Primc	Slovenia							61.26	
6	Ercüment Olgundeniz	Turkey							59.63	
7	Dragan Mustapić	Croatia							58.45	
8	Stéphane Nativel	France							56.41	
9	Cristiano Andrei	Italy							56.22	

=== Hammer throw ===
September 14

Rank	Name	Nationality	#1	#2	#3	#4	#5	#6	Result	Notes
1st place, gold medalist(s)	Nicola Vizzoni	Italy							78.49	GR
2nd place, silver medalist(s)	Alexandros Papadimitriou	Greece							76.98	
3rd place, bronze medalist(s)	Raphaël Piolanti	France							71.52	
4	Primož Kozmus	Slovenia							71.12	
5	Eşref Apak	Turkey							71.06	
6	Moisés Campeny	Spain	69.02	x	66.78	68.57	67.19	66.94	69.02	
7	Saber Souid	Tunisia							63.57	
	Samir Haouam	Algeria							NM	
	David Chaussinand	France							DQ	

=== Javelin throw ===
September 14

Rank	Name	Nationality	#1	#2	#3	#4	#5	#6	Result	Notes
1st place, gold medalist(s)	Laurent Dorique	France	76.37	80.88					80.88	
2nd place, silver medalist(s)	Eleutherios Karasmanakis	Greece							77.58	
3rd place, bronze medalist(s)	Edi Ponoš	Croatia							76.12	
4	Dimitrios Polymerou	Greece							75.46	
5	Walid Ibrahim	Egypt							74.70	
6	Alberto Desiderio	Italy							73.46	
7	Mohamed Ali Ben Zina	Tunisia							72.55	
8	Pieros Tsissios	Cyprus							71.41	
9	Panos Kalogerou	Cyprus							70.26	
10	Armin Kerer	Italy							70.19	
11	Firass Zaal Al Hameed Mohamed	Syria							70.02	
12	Gabriele Mazza	San Marino							68.78	
13	José Manuel Hermoso	Spain	67.20	67.52	x				67.52	
14	Eduardo Veranes	Spain	66.22	63.20	64.15				66.22	
15	Maher Ridane	Tunisia							62.56	

=== Decathlon ===
September 11–12

The highest mark recorded in each event is highlighted in yellow

Rank	Athlete	Nationality	100m	LJ	SP	HJ	400m	110m H	DT	PV	JT	1500m	Points	Notes
1st place, gold medalist(s)	Prodromos Korkizoglou	Greece	10.75	7.33w	14.00	1.98	50.64	14.40	44.88	4.80	54.81	5:16.54	7773	
2nd place, silver medalist(s)	Hamdi Dhouibi	Tunisia	10.84	7.44	11.60	1.83	49.61	14.98	38.92	4.50	54.34	4:31.15	7530	
3rd place, bronze medalist(s)	Paolo Casarsa	Italy	11.29	6.77w	15.21	1.83	52.00	14.51	46.75	4.40	61.05	4:55.57	7522	
4	Marc Magrans	Spain	11.18	7.19	12.31	1.92	50.27	14.99	35.86	4.60	51.66	4:23.83	7459	
5	Marcos Moreno	Spain	11.14	7.03w	13.38	1.92	50.38	15.35	43.46	4.30	47.80	4:34.76	7384	
6	Pavlos Kouromihalakis	Greece	11.26	7.03w	13.22	2.01	52.13	15.47	36.90	4.90	50.65	4:46.22	7354	
7	Georgios Andreou	Cyprus	10.71	7.16	14.45	1.98	51.61	16.29	42.26	4.10	60.32	5:40.00	7211	
8	Mostafa Hassan	Egypt	10.98	6.95w	12.17	1.77	50.05	15.78	40.70	4.10	39.43	4:54.78	6804	
	Rédouane Youcef	Algeria	10.68	7.45w	11.36	1.83	48.93	15.63	37.52	NM	DNS	DNS	DNF	
	Anis Riahi	Tunisia	DNS	–	–	–	–	–	–	–	–	–	DNS	

== Women's results ==
=== 100 meters ===
Heats – September 11
Wind:
Heat 1: +3.1, Heat 2: +2.6, Heat 3: +2.9

Rank	Heat	Name	Nationality	Time	Notes
1	1	Nora Güner	Turkey	10.98	
2	2	Manuela Levorato	Italy	11.32	
3	2	Vukosava Đapić	Yugoslavia	11.46	
4	3	Effrosini Patsou	Greece	11.52	
5	3	Francesca Cola	Italy	11.54	
6	2	Céline Thelamon	France	11.56	
7		Aksel Gürcan	Turkey	11.61	
8		Sylvie Mballa Éloundou	France	11.63	
9	1	Awatef Hamrouni	Tunisia	11.65	
10		Athina Kopsia	Greece	11.83	
11	2	Marilia Gregoriou	Cyprus	11.86	
12	2	María Antonia Duque	Spain	12.00	
13	1	Margarita de Miguel	Spain	12.12	
14		Nathalie Saykaly	Lebanon	12.26	
15		Deirdre Farrugia	Malta	12.31	
16		Sandra Gabrael	Lebanon	12.98	

Final – September 11

Wind: +1.6 m/s

Rank	Name	Nationality	Time	Notes
1st place, gold medalist(s)	Nora Güner	Turkey	11.25	NR
2nd place, silver medalist(s)	Manuela Levorato	Italy	11.25	
3rd place, bronze medalist(s)	Effrosini Patsou	Greece	11.45	
4	Céline Thelamon	France	11.56	
5	Vukosava Đapić	Yugoslavia	11.60	
6	Aksel Gürcan	Turkey	11.74	
7	Francesca Cola	Italy	11.79	
8	Sylvie Mballa Éloundou	France	11.92	

=== 200 meters ===
Heats – September 13
Wind:
Heat ?: +0.4 m/s, Heat 3: +1.3

Rank	Heat	Name	Nationality	Time	Notes
1	3	Nora Güner	Turkey	23.30	
2		Anita Mormand	France	23.78	
3		Fabé Dia	France	23.81	
4		Olga Kaidantzi	Greece	24.16	
5		Manuela Grillo	Italy	24.52	
6		Awatef Hamrouni	Tunisia	24.64	
7		Vukosava Đapić	Yugoslavia	24.77	
8		Maja Nose	Slovenia	24.81	
9		Klodiana Shala	Albania	24.83	
10		Aksel Gürcan	Turkey	25.05	
11		Deirdre Farrugia	Malta	25.61	
12		Nathalie Saykaly	Lebanon	25.82	
13		Gretta Taslakian	Lebanon	25.92	
14		Sue Spiteri	Malta	26.53	
		Marilia Gregoriou	Cyprus	DNS	
		Manuela Levorato	Italy	DNS	
		Alenka Bikar	Slovenia	DNS	

Final – September 13

Wind: +2.6 m/s

Rank	Lane	Name	Nationality	Time	Notes
1st place, gold medalist(s)	4	Nora Güner	Turkey	22.86	
2nd place, silver medalist(s)	5	Fabé Dia	France	23.18	
3rd place, bronze medalist(s)	6	Anita Mormand	France	23.50	
4		Olga Kaidantzi	Greece	23.71	
5		Vukosava Đapić	Yugoslavia	23.88	
6		Awatef Hamrouni	Tunisia	23.93	
7		Manuela Grillo	Italy	24.15	
7		Aksel Gürcan	Turkey	24.15	

=== 400 meters ===
Heats – September 12

Rank	Heat	Name	Nationality	Time	Notes
1	1	Francine Landre	France	53.50	
2		Marie-Louise Bévis	France	53.55	
3		Danielle Perpoli	Italy	54.51	
4		Awatef Ben Hassine	Tunisia	54.58	
5		Chrysoula Gountunoudi	Greece	55.16	
6	1	Yolanda Reyes	Spain	55.68	
7		Fabiola Piroddi	Italy	55.70	
8		Klodiana Shala	Albania	56.43	
9		Christina Panagou	Greece	56.45	
10		Gretta Taslakian	Lebanon	58.08	
11		Sue Spiteri	Malta	1:00.10	
		Vaso Papaioannou	Cyprus	DNF	
		Tanya Blake	Malta	DNS	

Final – September 12

Rank	Lane	Name	Nationality	Time	Notes
1st place, gold medalist(s)	4	Marie-Louise Bévis	France	52.90	
2nd place, silver medalist(s)	5	Francine Landre	France	52.96	
3rd place, bronze medalist(s)	3	Awatef Ben Hassine	Tunisia	53.77	
4	6	Danielle Perpoli	Italy	54.04	
5	7	Chrysoula Gountunoudi	Greece	55.19	
6	2	Fabiola Piroddi	Italy	55.49	
7	8	Yolanda Reyes	Spain	55.79	
	1	Klodiana Shala	Albania	DNS	

=== 800 meters ===
Heats – September 11

Rank	Heat	Name	Nationality	Time	Notes
1		Brigita Langerholc	Slovenia	2:05.28	
2	2	Tanya Blake	Malta	2:05.43	
3	2	Süreyya Ayhan	Turkey	2:05.48	
4		Fatma Lanouar	Tunisia	2:05.49	
5		Abir Nakhli	Tunisia	2:05.68	
6		Seltana Aït Hammou	Morocco	2:05.89	
7		Mina Aït Hammou	Morocco	2:06.40	
8	1	Miriam Bravo	Spain	2:06.66	
9		Peggy Babin	France	2:06.70	
10		Nahida Touhami	Algeria	2:06.90	
11		Elisabetta Artuso	Italy	2:08.10	
12		Maria Papadopoulou	Greece	2:11.74	
13		Mirvette Hamze	Lebanon	2:20.16	
		Jolanda Čeplak	Slovenia	DNS	

Final – September 12

Rank	Name	Nationality	Time	Notes
1st place, gold medalist(s)	Seltana Aït Hammou	Morocco	2:04.28	
2nd place, silver medalist(s)	Brigita Langerholc	Slovenia	2:04.91	
3rd place, bronze medalist(s)	Abir Nakhli	Tunisia	2:04.98	
4	Mina Aït Hammou	Morocco	2:06.11	
5	Miriam Bravo	Spain	2:06.51	
6	Fatma Lanouar	Tunisia	2:08.28	
7	Tanya Blake	Malta	2:29.29	
	Süreyya Ayhan	Turkey	DNF	

=== 1500 meters ===
September 14

Rank	Name	Nationality	Time	Notes
1st place, gold medalist(s)	Fatma Lanouar	Tunisia	4:10.33	
2nd place, silver medalist(s)	Süreyya Ayhan	Turkey	4:10.69	
3rd place, bronze medalist(s)	Ebru Kavaklıoğlu	Turkey	4:12.03	
4	Seloua Ouaziz	Morocco	4:12.79	
5	Nahida Touhami	Algeria	4:15.26	
6	Helena Javornik	Slovenia	4:18.51	
7	Zulema Fuentes-Pila	Spain	4:20.44	
8	Iris Fuentes-Pila	Spain	4:23.20	
9	Abir Nakhli	Tunisia	4:24.89	
10	Seltana Aït Hammou	Morocco	4:26.53	
	Karolina Skourti	Greece	DNF	
	Ljiljana Ćulibrk	Croatia	DNS	
	Sara Palmas	Italy	DNS	

=== 5000 meters ===
September 13

Rank	Name	Nationality	Time	Notes
1st place, gold medalist(s)	Ebru Kavaklıoğlu	Turkey	15:26.33	
2nd place, silver medalist(s)	Asmae Leghzaoui	Morocco	15:29.35	
3rd place, bronze medalist(s)	Olivera Jevtić	Yugoslavia	15:40.61	
4	Helena Javornik	Slovenia	15:56.67	
5	Silvia Weissteiner	Italy	16:06.38	
6	Ouafae Frikech	Morocco	16:11.63	
7	Soulef Bouguerra	Tunisia	16:14.64	
8	Maria Protopappa	Greece	16:34.94	
9	Hana Chaouach	Tunisia	16:45.20	
10	Judith Plá	Spain	17:18.07	
	Yamina Belkacem	France	DNS	
	Elvan Abeylegesse	Turkey	DNS	

=== 10,000 meters ===
September 12

Rank	Name	Nationality	Time	Notes
1st place, gold medalist(s)	Asmae Leghzaoui	Morocco	31:16.94	CR
2nd place, silver medalist(s)	Olivera Jevtić	Yugoslavia	31:33.08	
3rd place, bronze medalist(s)	Elvan Abeylegesse	Turkey	32:29.20	
4	Silvia Sommaggio	Italy	33:08.18	
5	Soulef Bouguerra	Tunisia	33:53.27	
	Nasria Azaïdj	Algeria	DNS	

=== Marathon ===
September 11

Rank	Name	Nationality	Time	Notes
1st place, gold medalist(s)	Mehtap Sızmaz	Turkey	2:40:49	
2nd place, silver medalist(s)	Serap Aktaş	Turkey	2:43:18	
3rd place, bronze medalist(s)	Sonia Hamed Agoun	Tunisia	2:46:03	
4	Georgia Ampatzidou	Greece	2:52:37	
5	Nasria Azaïdj	Algeria	3:01:21	
	Spyridoula Souma	Greece	DNF	
	Lale Özturk	Turkey	DNF	

=== 100 meters hurdles ===
Heats – September 12
Wind:
Heat 1: +2.4 m/s, Heat 2: +0.9 m/s

Rank	Heat	Name	Nationality	Time	Notes
1	1	Patricia Girard	France	12.77	Q
2	2	Haydy Aron	France	12.96	Q
3	2	Margaret Macchiut	Italy	13.37	Q
4	2	Christiana Tambaki	Greece	13.38	Q
5	1	Flora Redoumi	Greece	13.44	Q
6	1	Esmeralda Arriscado	Spain	14.13	Q
6	2	Esen Kızıldağ	Turkey	14.13	q
8	2	Raquel Fraguas	Spain	14.14	q
9		Anila Meta	Albania	14.49	
10		Alaa Abdelhadi	Jordan	15.43	
11		Carine Cresto	Monaco	16.19	
12		Sandra Gabrael	Lebanon	25.37	
		Anzhela Atroshchenko	Turkey	DQ	

Final – September 12

Wind: +1.5 m/s

Rank	Lane	Name	Nationality	Time	Notes
1st place, gold medalist(s)	4	Patricia Girard	France	12.82	CR
2nd place, silver medalist(s)	3	Haydy Aron	France	13.04	
3rd place, bronze medalist(s)	5	Margaret Macchiut	Italy	13.31	
4	7	Christiana Tambaki	Greece	13.36	
5	6	Flora Redoumi	Greece	13.41	
6	2	Esen Kızıldağ	Turkey	14.10	
7	8	Raquel Fraguas	Spain	14.10	
8	1	Esmeralda Arriscado	Spain	14.37	

=== 400 meters hurdles ===
Heats – September 11

Rank	Heat	Name	Nationality	Time	Notes
1	2	Sylvanie Morandais	France	58.11	Q
2	2	Monika Niederstätter	Italy	58.19	Q
3	1	Meta Mačus	Slovenia	58.35	Q
4	1	Viviane Dorsile	France	58.53	Q
5	2	Androula Sialou	Cyprus	58.79	Q
6	1	Awatef Ben Hassine	Tunisia	59.82	Q
7	2	Miriam Alonso	Spain	59.98	q
8	2	Hristina Hantzi-Neag	Greece	1:00.46	q
9	1	Eva Paniagua	Spain	1:00.60	
10	1	Hala Ahmad	Egypt	1:06.84	
	1	Nezha Bidouane	Morocco	DNS	

Final – September 11

Rank	Lane	Name	Nationality	Time	Notes
1st place, gold medalist(s)	3	Sylvanie Morandais	France	57.02	
2nd place, silver medalist(s)	4	Monika Niederstätter	Italy	57.22	
3rd place, bronze medalist(s)	5	Meta Mačus	Slovenia	57.51	
4	1	Androula Sialou	Cyprus	58.18	
5	6	Viviane Dorsile	France	58.27	
6	2	Awatef Ben Hassine	Tunisia	59.30	
7	7	Miriam Alonso	Spain	59.84	
8	8	Hristina Hantzi-Neag	Greece	1:01.30	

=== 3000 meters steeplechase ===
September 11

Rank	Name	Nationality	Time	Notes
1st place, gold medalist(s)	Élodie Olivarès	France	9:44.68	CR
2nd place, silver medalist(s)	Laurence Duquénoy	France	10:05.90	
3rd place, bronze medalist(s)	Hana Chaouach	Tunisia	10:18.31	
4	Malika Ghariani	Tunisia	10:38.65	

=== 4 × 100 meters relay ===
September 13

Rank	Nation	Competitors	Time	Notes
1st place, gold medalist(s)	France	Haydy Aron, Céline Thelamon, Fabé Dia, Sylvie Mballa Éloundou	44.40	
2nd place, silver medalist(s)	Italy	Anita Pistone, Francesca Cola, Manuela Grillo, Danielle Perpoli	44.89	
3rd place, bronze medalist(s)	Greece	Athina Kopsia, Effrosyni Patsou, Olga Kaidantzi, Giannoula Kafetzi	44.97	
4	Spain	María Antonia Duque, Margarita de Miguel, Concepción Montaner, Raquel Fraguas	47.64	
5	Lebanon	Rania Estephan, Gretta Taslakian, Sandra Gabrael, Nathalie Saykaly	49.30	

=== 4 × 400 meters relay ===
September 14

Rank	Nation	Competitors	Time	Notes
1st place, gold medalist(s)	France	Anita Mormand, Viviane Dorsile, Marie-Louise Bévis, Francine Landre	3:34.28	
2nd place, silver medalist(s)	Italy	Daniela Reina, Fabiola Piroddi, Francesca Carbone, Danielle Perpoli	3:38.90	
3rd place, bronze medalist(s)	Greece	Georgia Koumnaki, Hristina Hantzi-Neag, Paraskevi Tsapara, Chrysoula Goudenoudi	3:42.22	
4	Spain	Miriam Alonso, Yolanda Reyes, Miriam Bravo, Eva Paniagua	3:43.14	
5	Cyprus	Vaso Papaioannou, Theodora Kyriakou, Alissa Kallinikou, Androula Sialou	3:43.20	
6	Tunisia	Awatef Hamrouni, Fatma Lanouar, Abir Nakhli, Awatef Ben Hassine	3:47.10	

=== 20 kilometers walk ===
September 14

Rank	Name	Nationality	Time	Notes
1st place, gold medalist(s)	Erica Alfridi	Italy	1:36:47	CR
2nd place, silver medalist(s)	Elisabetta Perrone	Italy	1:36:47	
3rd place, bronze medalist(s)	Rocío Florido	Spain	1:37:14	
4	Athina Papagianni	Greece	1:37:21	
5	Teresa Linares	Spain	1:42:24	
6	Thouraya Hamrouni	Tunisia	1:44:35	
7	Nagwa Ibrahim Saleh Ali	Egypt	1:45:54	
	Fatiha Ouali	France	DNF	
	Hristina Kokotou	Greece	DNF	

=== High jump ===
September 12

Rank	Name	Nationality	1.70	1.75	1.79	1.83	1.87	1.90	Result	Notes
1st place, gold medalist(s)	Blanka Vlašić	Croatia							1.90	
2nd place, silver medalist(s)	Nevena Lenđel	Croatia							1.87	
3rd place, bronze medalist(s)	Anna Visigalli	Italy							1.87	
4	Ruth Beitia	Spain	o	o	o	o	xxx		1.83	
4	Lea Cimperman	Slovenia							1.83	
6	Agni Charalambous	Cyprus							1.83	
7	Ioulia Farmaka	Cyprus							1.79	
8	Candeğer Kılınçer	Turkey							1.79	
9	Eleni Syropoulou	Greece							1.75	
10	Zin Elbehi Othmani	Tunisia							1.70	
	Maria Chotokouridou	Greece							NM	

=== Pole vault ===
September 11

Rank	Name	Nationality	3.70	3.80	3.90	4.00	4.10	4.25	Result	Notes
1st place, gold medalist(s)	Dana Cervantes	Spain	–	xxo	–	xo	o	xxx	4.10	CR
2nd place, silver medalist(s)	Thaleia Iakovidou	Greece							4.00	
3rd place, bronze medalist(s)	Marie Poissonnier	France							3.90	
4	Yeoryia Tsiliggiri	Greece							3.80	
5	Naroa Agirre	Spain	–	o	xxx				3.80	
6	Syrine Balti	Tunisia							3.70	
	Anna Fitidou	Cyprus							NM	
	Emilie Becot	France							NM	
	Arianna Farfaletti	Italy							NM	

=== Long jump ===
September 13

Rank	Name	Nationality	#1	#2	#3	#4	#5	#6	Result	Notes
1st place, gold medalist(s)	Concepción Montaner	Spain	x	6.48	x	5.89	x	4.57	6.48	
2nd place, silver medalist(s)	Stiliani Pilatou	Greece							6.41	
3rd place, bronze medalist(s)	Silvia Favre	Italy							6.14	
4	Irini Charalambous	Cyprus							6.09	
5	Baya Rahouli	Algeria							5.98	
6	Laura Gatto	Italy							5.83	
7	Anila Meta	Albania							5.71	
8	Lara Gerada	Malta							5.69	
9	Rania Estephan	Lebanon							5.60	
10	Awatef Hamrouni	Tunisia							5.44	
11	Montserrat Pujol	Andorra							5.42	
12	Sandra Gabrael	Lebanon							5.35	
	Hristina Athanasiou	Cyprus							NM	

=== Triple jump ===
September 14

Rank	Name	Nationality	#1	#2	#3	#4	#5	#6	Result	Notes
1st place, gold medalist(s)	Baya Rahouli	Algeria							14.30w	
2nd place, silver medalist(s)	Marija Martinović	Yugoslavia							13.97w	
3rd place, bronze medalist(s)	Carlota Castrejana	Spain	13.72w	13.52w	13.35	13.55w	13.53w	13.50	13.72w	
4	Amy Zongo	France							13.66w	
5	Chrisopigi Devetzi	Greece							13.61w	
6	Silvia Biondini	Italy							13.33w	
7	Giannoula Kafetzi	Greece							13.24w	
8	Stéphanie Luzieux	France							12.97w	
9	Lara Gerada	Malta							11.86	
10	Montserrat Pujol	Andorra							11.70w	
11	Rania Estephan	Lebanon							11.48w	
	Magdelín Martínez	Italy							NM	

=== Shot put ===
September 12

Rank	Name	Nationality	#1	#2	#3	#4	#5	#6	Result	Notes
1st place, gold medalist(s)	Assunta Legnante	Italy							17.23	
2nd place, silver medalist(s)	Irini Terzoglou	Greece							16.97	
3rd place, bronze medalist(s)	Martina de la Puente	Spain	16.53	16.45	16.55	x	16.33	x	16.55	
4	Laurence Manfredi	France							15.61	
5	Amel Ben Khaled	Tunisia							15.37	
6	Christina Strovolidou	Cyprus							15.22	
7	Olympia Menelaou	Cyprus							15.11	

=== Discus throw ===
September 11

Rank	Name	Nationality	#1	#2	#3	#4	#5	#6	Result	Notes
1st place, gold medalist(s)	Areti Abatzi	Greece							61.42	
2nd place, silver medalist(s)	Agnese Maffeis	Italy							57.38	
3rd place, bronze medalist(s)	Monia Kari	Tunisia							56.44	
4	Alice Matejkova	Spain	55.05	56.07	x	54.60	56.23	51.96	56.23	
5	Vera Begić	Croatia							52.18	
6	Heba Zaghary	Egypt							47.76	

=== Hammer throw ===
September 13

Rank	Name	Nationality	#1	#2	#3	#4	#5	#6	Result	Notes
1st place, gold medalist(s)	Florence Ezeh	France	62.00	62.40	64.59	64.10	61.15	x	64.59	GR
2nd place, silver medalist(s)	Ester Balassini	Italy							64.13	
3rd place, bronze medalist(s)	Alexandra Papageorgiou	Greece							62.87	
4	Ivana Brkljačić	Croatia							61.44	
5	Marwa Hussein	Egypt							61.18	
6	Berta Castells	Spain	x	55.44	58.15	57.59	60.10	57.33	60.10	
7	Evdokia Tsamoglou	Greece							59.98	
8	Monica Torazzi	Italy							58.92	
9	Dolores Pedrares	Spain	53.86	57.27	x				57.27	
10	Eleni Teloni	Cyprus							53.10	
11	Zübeyde Yıldız	Turkey							49.37	
	Hayat El Ghazi	Morocco							NM	

=== Javelin throw ===
September 13

Rank	Name	Nationality	#1	#2	#3	#4	#5	#6	Result	Notes
1st place, gold medalist(s)	Claudia Coslovich	Italy							62.02	GR
2nd place, silver medalist(s)	Aggeliki Tsiolakoudi	Greece							58.16	
3rd place, bronze medalist(s)	Marta Míguez	Spain	53.65	x	52.36	51.66	51.59	55.19	55.19	
4	Sarah Walter	France							54.46	
5	Aïda Sellam	Tunisia							53.23	
6	Mercedes Chilla	Spain	51.06	49.45	51.44	50.15	47.85	x	51.44	
7	Salwa Dhouibi	Tunisia							42.64	

=== Heptathlon ===
September 13–14

The highest mark recorded in each event is highlighted in yellow

Rank	Athlete	Nationality	100m H	HJ	SP	200m	LJ	JT	800m	Points	Notes
1st place, gold medalist(s)	Anzhela Atroshchenko	Turkey	14.10	1.68	12.61	24.75	5.87	39.94	2:10.95	5833	
2nd place, silver medalist(s)	Gertrud Bacher	Italy	14.32	1.65	13.41	24.93	5.72	43.58	2:15.45	5764	
3rd place, bronze medalist(s)	Julie Mézerette	France	14.70	1.80	11.03	25.04	5.85	40.79	2:18.53	5670	
4	Asimina Vanakara	Greece	14.64	1.71	10.70	24.51	5.90	38.58	2:16.22	5599	
5	Silvia Dalla Piana	Italy	14.74	1.77	11.29	26.36	5.82	38.54	2:22.85	5416	
6	Imen Chatbri	Tunisia	15.22	1.59	11.69	26.83	4.57	40.51	2:16.83	4894	
7	Hanene Dhouibi	Tunisia	15.49	1.77	12.35	26.45	5.38	42.92	DNF	4549	
	Athina Papasotiriou	Greece	14.44	1.65	12.56	25.73	NM	DNS	–	DNF	
	Yasmina Azzizi-Kettab	Algeria	DNF	NM	DNS	–	–	–	–	DNF	
