= Italy at the 2001 Mediterranean Games =

- IOC code: ITA
- NOC: Italian National Olympic Committee

in Tunis
- Medals Ranked 2nd: Gold 38 Silver 59 Bronze 39 Total 136

Mediterranean Games appearances (overview)
- 1951; 1955; 1959; 1963; 1967; 1971; 1975; 1979; 1983; 1987; 1991; 1993; 1997; 2001; 2005; 2009; 2013; 2018; 2022; 2026

Italy competed at the 2001 Mediterranean Games in Tunis, Tunisia.

== Medals ==
=== Athletics ===
| Sport | Gold | Silver | Bronze | Total |
|---|---|---|---|---|
| Athletics | 9 | 14 | 7 | 30 |
| Totals (1 entries) | 9 | 14 | 7 | 30 |

==== Men ====
| Event | 1st place, gold medalist(s) | 2nd place, silver medalist(s) | 3rd place, bronze medalist(s) |
|---|---|---|---|
| 4×100 metres relay | Francesco Scuderi; Maurizio Checcucci; Marco Torrieri; Andrea Colombo | | |
| Marathon | Sergio Chiesa | | |
| Pole vault | Andrea Giannini | Giuseppe Gibilisco | |
| Triple jump | Fabrizio Donato | | |
| Discus throw | Diego Fortuna | | |
| Hammer throw | Nicola Vizzoni | | |
| 100 metres | | Maurizio Checcucci | |
| 200 metres | | Andrea Colombo | |
| 110 metres hurdles | | Devis Favero | |
| High jump | | Giulio Ciotti | |
| Shot put | | Paolo Dal Soglio | |
| 400 metres hurdles | | | Laurent Ottoz |
| 20 km walk | | | Alessandro Gandellini |
| Long jump | | | Nicola Trentin |
| Decathlon | | | Paolo Casarsa |
| | 6 | 6 | 4 |

==== Women ====
| Event | 1st place, gold medalist(s) | 2nd place, silver medalist(s) | 3rd place, bronze medalist(s) |
|---|---|---|---|
| 20 km walk | Erica Alfridi | Elisabetta Perrone | |
| Shot put | Assunta Legnante | | |
| Javelin throw | Claudia Coslovich | | |
| 100 metres | | Manuela Levorato | |
| 400 metres hurdles | | Monika Niederstätter | |
| 4×100 metres relay | | Francesca Cola; Manuela Grillo; Danielle Perpoli; Annarita Pistone | |
| 4×400 metres relay | | Francesca Carbone; Danielle Perpoli; Fabiola Piroddi; Daniela Reina | |
| Discus throw | | Agnese Maffeis | |
| Hammer throw | | Ester Balassini | |
| Heptathlon | | Gertrud Bacher | |
| 100 metres hurdles | | | Margaret Macchiut |
| High jump | | | Anna Visigalli |
| Long jump | | | Silvia Favre |
| | 3 | 8 | 3 |
