= 1996 World Junior Championships in Athletics – Men's 400 metres =

The men's 400 metres event at the 1996 World Junior Championships in Athletics was held in Sydney, Australia, at International Athletic Centre on 21, 22 and 23 August.

== Medalists ==
Gold	Obea Moore; United States
Silver	Nico Snyman; South Africa
Bronze	Shane Niemi; Canada

== Results ==
=== Final ===
23 August

Rank	Name	Nationality	Time	Notes
1st place, gold medalist(s)	Obea Moore	United States	45.27	
2nd place, silver medalist(s)	Nico Snyman	South Africa	45.71	
3rd place, bronze medalist(s)	Shane Niemi	Canada	45.94	
4	Dai Tamesue	Japan	46.03	
5	Piotr Haczek	Poland	46.29	
6	Rohan McDonald	Jamaica	46.88	
7	David Canal	Spain	47.21	
8	Piotr Długosielski	Poland	47.43	

=== Semifinals ===
22 August

==== Semifinal 1 ====
Rank	Name	Nationality	Time	Notes
1	Jerome Davis	United States	46.58	Q
2	Rohan McDonald	Jamaica	46.92	Q
3	Piotr Długosielski	Poland	46.93	q
4	Sofiène Labidi	Tunisia	47.24	
5	Honory McDonald	Trinidad and Tobago	47.26	
6	Edoardo Vallet	Italy	47.35	
7	Chris Jacobs	South Africa	48.03	
8	Paul Ngotho	Kenya	48.28	

==== Semifinal 2 ====
Rank	Name	Nationality	Time	Notes
1	Nico Snyman	South Africa	46.03	Q
2	Obea Moore	United States	46.60	Q
3	Shane Niemi	Canada	46.92	q
4	Carlos Gachanja	Germany	47.07	
5	Jimisola Laursen	Sweden	47.79	
6	Avard Moncur	Bahamas	47.90	
7	Michael Campbell	Jamaica	48.04	
8	Casey Vincent	Australia	48.16	

==== Semifinal 3 ====
Rank	Name	Nationality	Time	Notes
1	Piotr Haczek	Poland	46.82	Q
2	David Canal	Spain	47.06	Q
3	Geoff Dearman	United Kingdom	47.40	
4	Brad Jamieson	Australia	47.70	
5	Edel Hevia	Cuba	47.72	
6	Themba Ncube	Zimbabwe	48.05	
7	Moses Mabaso	South Africa	48.21	
8	Tommi Hartonen	Finland	48.27	

=== Heats ===
21 August

==== Heat 1 ====
Rank	Name	Nationality	Time	Notes
1	Piotr Długosielski	Poland	47.17	Q
2	Honory McDonald	Trinidad and Tobago	47.19	Q
3	Shane Niemi	Canada	47.20	Q
4	Jimisola Laursen	Sweden	47.72	q
5	Moses Mabaso	South Africa	47.83	q
6	Gustavo Aguirre	Argentina	48.46	
7	Angelo Ignatius	Netherlands Antilles	48.96	

==== Heat 2 ====
Rank	Name	Nationality	Time	Notes
1	David Canal	Spain	47.43	Q
2	Michael Campbell	Jamaica	47.43	Q
3	Avard Moncur	Bahamas	47.66	Q
4	Sofiène Labidi	Tunisia	47.80	q
5	Periklís Iakovákis	Greece	47.98	
6	Simon Potter	New Zealand	48.19	
7	Henele Taliai	Tonga	49.63	

==== Heat 3 ====
Rank	Name	Nationality	Time	Notes
1	Carlos Gachanja	Germany	47.18	Q
2	Obea Moore	United States	47.23	Q
3	Brad Jamieson	Australia	47.76	Q
4	Marco Cagnazzi	Italy	48.31	
5	Aleksey Baryshnikov	Russia	48.66	
6	Emmanuel Rubayiza	Rwanda	49.58	

==== Heat 4 ====
Rank	Name	Nationality	Time	Notes
1	Themba Ncube	Zimbabwe	47.34	Q
2	Edel Hevia	Cuba	47.52	Q
3	Paul Ngotho	Kenya	47.70	Q
4	Ryo Fujimori	Japan	47.91	
5	David Wilson	Guam	48.81	
6	Wendell da Silva	Brazil	48.91	
7	David Eichenberger	Switzerland	50.49	

==== Heat 5 ====
Rank	Name	Nationality	Time	Notes
1	Piotr Haczek	Poland	47.11	Q
2	Edoardo Vallet	Italy	47.47	Q
3	Casey Vincent	Australia	47.94	Q
4	Chang Po-Chih	Chinese Taipei	48.16	
5	Hyginus Anugho	Nigeria	48.60	
6	André dos Santos	Brazil	49.31	

==== Heat 6 ====
Rank	Name	Nationality	Time	Notes
1	Dai Tamesue	Japan	47.28	Q
2	Rohan McDonald	Jamaica	47.67	Q
3	Tommi Hartonen	Finland	47.76	Q
4	Adrián Fernández	Spain	48.00	
5	Kris Stewart	United Kingdom	48.05	
6	Frano Bakaric	Croatia	48.56	

==== Heat 7 ====
Rank	Name	Nationality	Time	Notes
1	Jerome Davis	United States	47.30	Q
2	Geoff Dearman	United Kingdom	47.48	Q
3	Chris Jacobs	South Africa	47.78	Q
4	Andrey Tverdostup	Ukraine	48.08	
5	Pierre Constentias	France	48.25	
6	Novian Suhendra	Indonesia	48.76	
7	Yeóryios Ikonomídis	Greece	49.17	

== Participation ==
According to an unofficial count, 46 athletes from 35 countries participated in the event.

- Argentina (1)
- Australia (2)
- Bahamas (1)
- Brazil (2)
- Canada (1)
- Chinese Taipei (1)
- Croatia (1)
- Cuba (1)
- Finland (1)
- France (1)
- Germany (1)
- Greece (2)
- Guam (1)
- Indonesia (1)
- Italy (2)
- Jamaica (2)
- Japan (2)
- Kenya (1)
- Netherlands Antilles (1)
- New Zealand (1)
- Nigeria (1)
- Poland (2)
- Russia (1)
- Rwanda (1)
- South Africa (2)
- Spain (2)
- Sweden (1)
- Switzerland (1)
- Tonga (1)
- Trinidad and Tobago (1)
- Tunisia (1)
- Ukraine (1)
- United Kingdom (2)
- United States (2)
- Zimbabwe (1)
