= 1996 World Junior Championships in Athletics – Men's 4 × 400 metres relay =

The men's 4x400 metres relay event at the 1996 World Junior Championships in Athletics was held in Sydney, Australia, at International Athletic Centre on 24 and 25 August.

== Medalists ==
Gold	Desmond Johnson; Jerome Davis; Robin Martin; Obea Moore; United States
Silver	Hiroki Takahashi; Dai Tamesue; Masayuki Okusako; Shinji Morita; Japan
Bronze	Kris Stewart; Tom Lerwill; Mark Rowlands; Geoff Dearman; United Kingdom

== Results ==
=== Final ===
25 August

Rank	Nation	Competitors	Time	Notes
1st place, gold medalist(s)	United States	Desmond Johnson; Jerome Davis; Robin Martin; Obea Moore	3:03.65	
2nd place, silver medalist(s)	Japan	Hiroki Takahashi; Dai Tamesue; Masayuki Okusako; Shinji Morita	3:06.01	
3rd place, bronze medalist(s)	United Kingdom	Kris Stewart; Tom Lerwill; Mark Rowlands; Geoff Dearman	3:06.76	
4	Spain	Victor Vallejo; Adrián Fernández; Alberto Martínez; David Canal	3:06.95	
5	Australia	Scott Thom; Eugene Bernaudo; Brad Jamieson; Casey Vincent	3:07.21	
6	Poland	Piotr Jagiello; Jacek Lewandowski; Piotr Długosielski; Piotr Haczek	3:08.04	
7	Jamaica	Michael Campbell; Roy Bailey; David Spencer; Rohan McDonald	3:09.04	
8	Kenya	Joseph Mutua; Paul Ngotho; Japheth Kimutai; Isaac Magut	3:09.04	

=== Heats ===
24 August

==== Heat 1 ====
Rank	Nation	Competitors	Time	Notes
1	United States	Desmond Johnson; Jerome Davis; Robin Martin; Obea Moore	3:08.21	Q
2	United Kingdom	Kris Stewart; Tom Lerwill; Mark Rowlands; Geoff Dearman	3:08.36	Q
3	Poland	Piotr Jagiello; Jacek Lewandowski; Piotr Długosielski; Piotr Haczek	3:08.39	Q
4	Australia	Clay Murphy; Eugene Bernaudo; Brad Jamieson; Bryce Barnwell	3:08.48	q
5	Spain	Victor Vallejo; Adrián Fernández; Alberto Martínez; David Canal	3:08.69	q
6	South Africa	Juan Labuschagne; Chris Jacobs; Thabo Thobelangope; Moses Mabaso	3:13.85	
7	New Zealand	Nathan Godfrey; Clyde McIntosh; David Baird; Simon Potter	3:14.16	
	Greece	Nikólaos Giannadákis; Nikólaos Grigorópoulos; Yeóryios Ikonomídis; Periklís Iakovákis	DNF	

==== Heat 2 ====
Rank	Nation	Competitors	Time	Notes
1	Jamaica	Marlon Baugh; Michael Campbell; David Spencer; Rohan McDonald	3:08.45	Q
2	Japan	Hiroki Takahashi; Ryo Fujimori; Shinji Morita; Dai Tamesue	3:09.31	Q
3	Kenya	Joseph Mutua; Paul Ngotho; Japheth Kimutai; Isaac Magut	3:11.17	Q
4	Germany	Aljoscha Nemitz; Maik Liebe; Thomas Goller; Carlos Gachanja	3:11.39	
5	Canada	Alexandre Marchand; Zach Whitmarsh; Jay Cantin; Shane Niemi	3:12.03	
6	Italy	Marco Cagnazzi; Ezio Preatoni; Edoardo Vallet; Francesco Filisetti	3:12.24	
7	Russia	Andrey Semyonov; Boris Gorban; Sergey Fedko; Aleksey Baryshnikov	3:13.56	
	Qatar	Mubarak Al-Nubi; Khalifa Mubarak Waleed; Amjad Abbass; Hamad Al-Dosari	DNF	

== Participation ==
According to an unofficial count, 68 athletes from 16 countries participated in the event.

- Australia (6)
- Canada (4)
- Germany (4)
- Greece (4)
- Italy (4)
- Jamaica (5)
- Japan (5)
- Kenya (4)
- New Zealand (4)
- Poland (4)
- Qatar (4)
- Russia (4)
- South Africa (4)
- Spain (4)
- United Kingdom (4)
- United States (4)
