= Shane Niemi =

Canadian sprinter

Personal information
- Born: June 2, 1978 (age 48) Kamloops, British Columbia, Canada

Sport
- Sport: Track and field
Medal record
Representing Canada
Commonwealth Games
Silver medal – second place	2002 Manchester	400m
World Junior Championships
Bronze medal – third place	1996 Sydney	400m

Shane Niemi (born June 2, 1978) is a retired Canadian sprints athlete. As a 17 year old he took the bronze medal in the 400 metres at the 1995 Pan American Junior Athletics Championships behind Obea Moore's then World Youth Best. The same three athletes (Jerome Young in silver position) finished in the same order at the 1996 World Junior Championships in Athletics. He returned to the 1997 Pan American Junior Athletics Championships to take the gold medal in the event. He was not able to make the qualifying standard for the 2000 Olympics.

He ran his personal record, the Canadian record, 44.86 at the 2001 Jeux de la Francophonie (French Games) on home soil in Ottawa to take gold. He made the semi-finals at 2001 World Championships in Athletics and the following year earned the silver medal at the 2002 Commonwealth Games beating the world champion Avard Moncur. He won six straight Canadian championships between 1998 and 2003. Unable to make the qualifying mark to the 2004 Olympics, he retired in late 2004.

== Competition record ==
Year	Competition	Venue	Position	Event	Notes
Representing Canada
1995	Pan American Junior Championships	Santiago, Chile	3rd	400 m	46.69
1995	Pan American Junior Championships	Santiago, Chile	4th	4 × 400 m relay	3:13.85
1996	World Junior Championships	Sydney, Australia	3rd	400 m	45.94
1996	World Junior Championships	Sydney, Australia	10th (h)	4 × 400 m relay	3:12.03
1997	Pan American Junior Championships	Havana, Cuba	1st	400 m	45.83
1997	Pan American Junior Championships	Havana, Cuba	4th	4 × 100 m relay	40.85
1997	Pan American Junior Championships	Havana, Cuba	4th	4 × 400 m relay	3:12.27
1998	Commonwealth Games	Kuala Lumpur, Malaysia	(qf)	400 m	46.17
1998	Commonwealth Games	Kuala Lumpur, Malaysia	8th	4 × 400 m relay	3:04.84
1999	Pan American Games	Winnipeg, Manitoba, Canada	10th (h)	400 m	45.81
1999	Pan American Games	Winnipeg, Manitoba, Canada	5th	4 × 400 m relay	3:03.06
1999	World Championships	Seville, Spain	30th (qf)	400 m	46.57
1999	World Championships	Seville, Spain	16th (h)	4 × 400 m relay	3:05.60
2001	World Indoor Championships	Lisbon, Portugal	20th (h)	400 m	47.80
2001	Jeux de la Francophonie	Ottawa-Hull, Canada	1st	400 m	44.86
2001	World Championships	Edmonton, Alberta, Canada	15th (sf)	400 m	45.91
2001	World Championships	Edmonton, Alberta, Canada	20th (h)	4 × 400 m relay	3:04.87
2002	Commonwealth Games	Manchester, United Kingdom	2nd	400 m	45.09
2003	Pan American Games	Santo Domingo, Dominican Republic	5th	400 m	45.78
2003	World Championships	Paris, France	17th (sf)	400 m	45.60
2003	World Championships	Paris, France	9th (h)	4 × 400 m relay	3:02.97

He holds the current BC high school track and field 400m record of 46.8 in 1996 while he was attending Westsyde Secondary School in Kamloops.

=== Personal bests ===
- 200 metres - 20.61 s, Edmonton 2001
- 400 metres - 44.86 s, Ottawa 2001
