= 2003 World Championships in Athletics – Men's 400 metres =

These are the official results of the Men's 400 metres event at the 2003 IAAF World Championships in Paris, France. There were a total number of 51 participating athletes, with seven qualifying heats, three semi-finals and the final held on Tuesday 26 August 2003 at 21:50h. The winning margin was 0.02 seconds which as of May 2024 remains the narrowest winning margin in the men's 400 metres at these championships.

The gold medal was originally won by Jerome Young of the United States in 44.50, but he was later disqualified for doping, together with his teammate Calvin Harrison who finished in sixth place.

== Final ==
RANK	FINAL	TIME
	Tyree Washington (USA)	44.77
	Marc Raquil (FRA)	44.79
	Michael Blackwood (JAM)	44.80
4.	Leslie Djhone (FRA)	44.83
5.	Eric Milazar (MRI)	45.17
6.	Alleyne Francique (GRN)	45.48
—	Calvin Harrison (USA)	DQ
—	Jerome Young (USA)	DQ

== Semi-final ==
- Held on Sunday 24 August 2003

RANK	HEAT 1	TIME
1.	Eric Milazar (MRI)	44.75
2.	Alleyne Francique (GRN)	44.81
3.	Hamdan Odha Al-Bishi (KSA)	44.99
4.	Cedric van Branteghem (BEL)	45.27
5.	Carlos Santa (DOM)	45.43
6.	Anderson Jorge dos Santos (BRA)	45.94
—	Calvin Harrison (USA)	DQ
—	Jerome Young (USA)	44.70

RANK	HEAT 2	TIME
1.	Tyree Washington (USA)	44.60
2.	Leslie Djhone (FRA)	45.03
3.	Daniel Caines (GBR)	45.29
4.	Chris Brown (BAH)	45.29
5.	Sofiane Labidi (TUN)	45.56
6.	Avard Moncur (BAH)	45.65
7.	Ingo Schultz (GER)	46.02
8.	Fawzi Al-Shammari (KUW)	46.52

RANK	HEAT 3	TIME
1.	Marc Raquil (FRA)	44.88
2.	Michael Blackwood (JAM)	44.98
3.	Gary Kikaya (COD)	44.99
4.	Yeimer López (CUB)	45.11
5.	Brandon Simpson (JAM)	45.18
6.	Clinton Hill (AUS)	45.35
7.	Shane Niemi (CAN)	45.60
8.	David Canal (ESP)	45.63

== Heats ==
Held on Saturday 23 August 2003

RANK	HEAT 1	TIME
1.	Michael Blackwood (JAM)	45.13
2.	Eric Milazar (MRI)	45.15
3.	Avard Moncur (BAH)	45.40
4.	Anderson Jorge dos Santos (BRA)	45.62
5.	Marcus La Grange (RSA)	45.68
6.	Victor Kibet (KEN)	46.15
7.	Yoube Ould H'meïde (MTN)	49.60
—	Geoffrey Bai (PNG)	DQ

RANK	HEAT 2	TIME
1.	Yeimer López (CUB)	45.62
2.	Sofiane Labidi (TUN)	46.07
3.	Vincent Mumo Kiilu (KEN)	46.09
4.	Zsolt Szeglet (HUN)	46.14
5.	Daniel Batman (AUS)	46.22
6.	Paul McKee (IRL)	46.43
—	Calvin Harrison (USA)	DQ

RANK	HEAT 3	TIME
1.	Gary Kikaya (COD)	45.45
2.	Cedric van Branteghem (BEL)	45.69
3.	Carlos Santa (DOM)	45.89
4.	Ezra Sambu (KEN)	46.01
5.	Ioan Lucian Vieru (ROU)	46.61
6.	Chris Lloyd (DMA)	46.74
7.	Nagmeldin Ali Abubakr (SUD)	46.78

RANK	HEAT 4	TIME
1.	Tyree Washington (USA)	45.30
2.	Daniel Caines (GBR)	45.35
3.	Leslie Djhone (FRA)	45.48
4.	Ingo Schultz (GER)	45.55
5.	Andrea Barberi (ITA)	45.87
6.	California Molefe (BOT)	46.12
7.	Malik Louahla (ALG)	46.22

RANK	HEAT 5	TIME
1.	Marc Raquil (FRA)	45.49
2.	Brandon Simpson (JAM)	45.60
3.	Shane Niemi (CAN)	45.83
4.	Anton Galkin (RUS)	45.89
5.	Sugath Thilakaratne (SRI)	46.09
6.	Jun Osakada (JPN)	46.51
7.	Danilson Ricciuli (GBS)	48.74
—	Kelsey Nakanelua (ASA)	DNF

RANK	HEAT 6	TIME
1.	Hamdan Odha Al-Bishi (KSA)	45.42
2.	David Canal (ESP)	45.86
3.	Paul Gorries (RSA)	45.98
4.	Stilianos Dimotsios (GRE)	46.48
5.	Mitsuhiro Sato (JPN)	46.53
—	Bothwell Nachihulu (ZAM)	DQ
—	Jerome Young (USA)	45.28

RANK	HEAT 7	TIME
1.	Chris Brown (BAH)	45.35
2.	Fawzi Al-Shammari (KUW)	45.41
3.	Alleyne Francique (GRN)	45.62
4.	Clinton Hill (AUS)	45.64
5.	Jimisola Laursen (SWE)	45.87
6.	Davian Clarke (JAM)	46.26
7.	Kenmore Hughes (ATG)	48.36
8.	Un Kei Chao (MAC)	50.11

== See also ==
- Athletics at the 2003 Pan American Games - Men's 400 metres
