= Athletics at the 2003 Pan American Games – Men's 400 metres =

Men's 400 metres at the Pan American Games

The final of the Men's 400 metres event at the 2003 Pan American Games took place on Friday August 8, 2003, with the heats staged a day earlier in the Juan Pablo Duarte Olympic Stadium in Santo Domingo, Dominican Republic.

== Medalists ==
Gold	Mitch Potter; United States
Silver	Yeimer López; Cuba
Bronze	Alleyne Francique; Grenada

== Records ==
World Record	Michael Johnson (USA)	43.18	August 26, 1999	Seville, Spain
Pan Am Record	Ronnie Ray (USA)	44.45	October 18, 1975	Mexico City, Mexico

== Results ==
Rank	Athlete	Heats		Final
Rank	Athlete	Time	Rank	Time
1	Mitch Potter (USA)	45.62	2	45.11
2	Yeimer López (CUB)	45.69	3	45.13
3	Alleyne Francique (GRN)	45.31	1	45.51
4	Adam Steele (USA)	45.83	6	45.72
5	Shane Niemi (CAN)	45.89	7	45.78
6	Carlos Yohelín Santa (DOM)	45.82	5	45.85
7	Michael Campbell (JAM)	45.79	4	46.10
8	Davian Clarke (JAM)	45.93	8	46.17
9	Glauder Garzón (CUB)	45.99	9	
10	Chris Lloyd (DMA)	46.53	10	
11	Dennis Darling (BAH)	46.59	11	
12	Damion Barry (TRI)	46.79	12	
13	Mauricio Mery (CHI)	46.92	13	
14	Geronimo Goeloe (AHO)	47.61	14	
15	Jonnie Lowe (HON)	47.78	15	
16	Kenneth Telemaque (ISV)	48.85	16	
17	Cristian Gutiérrez (ECU)	49.88	17	

== See also ==
- 2003 World Championships in Athletics – Men's 400 metres
- Athletics at the 2004 Summer Olympics – Men's 400 metres
