= Edi Ponoš =

Croatian javelin thrower

Edi Ponoš (born 10 April 1976) is a male javelin thrower from Croatia. His personal best throw was 77.95 metres, achieved in June 2004 in Ljubljana.

He won the bronze medal at the 2001 Mediterranean Games. He also competed at the 2004 Olympic Games, but without reaching the final. He became Croatian javelin throw champion in 2001, 2002, 2003, 2004 and 2006.

In June 2009 Ponoš was severely injured in a motorcycle accident and spent 10 days in a coma. By September 2009, Ponoš was already back to light training, having made a successful recovery.

== Competition record ==
Year	Competition	Venue	Position	Notes
Representing Croatia
1995	European Junior Championships	Nyíregyháza, Hungary	5th	68.44 m
2001	Mediterranean Games	Radès, Tunisia	3rd	76.12 m
2004	Olympic Games	Athens, Greece	33rd (q)	71.43 m
2005	Mediterranean Games	Almería, Spain	6th	67.91 m
