= Haïdy Aron =

French hurdler

Personal information
- Nationality: French
- Born: 21 May 1973 (age 52) Paramaribo
- Years active: 1996–2003

Sport
- Event(s): 100 m hurdles, 60 m hurdles

Haïdy Aron (born 21 May 1973 at Paramaribo) is a French athlete, who specializes in the 100 meters hurdles. She ended her international career in 2005.

She won the silver medal at the 2001 Mediterranean Games, won the 4 × 100 metres relay at the same competition, finished seventh at the 2001 Jeux de la Francophonie and joint fifth at the 2002 European Championships.

Her personal best time was 12.85 seconds, achieved in August 2002 in La Chaux-de-Fonds. In the 60 metres hurdles she had 8.07 seconds from February 2001 in Liévin, and she also had 6.44 metres in the long jump. During these European Championships, she was captain of the team of France.

She is still today an active member of the Association of French Athletes (GAF).

== Biography ==
Of Surinamese origin and French by her father, Haidy ran her first race at the age of 15. Quickly identified as talented, she was integrated into the group of Jacques Piasenta. She participated in the World Junior Championships in Seoul in 1992. Despite finishing third at the 1996 Championships in France, she was not accepted for the 1996 Summer Olympics at Atlanta. She was stopped from competition due to repeated injuries of the patellar tendon from 1997 to 2000. She was operated on three times by Professor Saillant. Her career experienced a second wind in 2001. She was Indoor champion of France at the 60 meter hurdles this year. Then coached by Stéphane Caristan she participated in the 2002 European Championships at Munich. She also ran in the 2003 World Championships in Athletics at St Denis.

She was also a long jumper with a personal best to 6.44m
