= Georgios Oikonomidis =

Greek sprinter

Georgios Oikonomidis (born 29 October 1978) is a Greek former sprinter who competed in the 2000 Summer Olympics.

== Honours ==
| Year | Competition | Venue | Position | Event | Notes |
Representing Greece
| 1996 | World Junior Championships | Sydney, Australia | 42nd (h) | 400m | 49.17 |
| 1996 | World Junior Championships | Sydney, Australia | — | 4×400m relay | DNF |
| 2000 | Olympic Games | Sydney, Australia | 18th (h) | 4 × 400 m relay | 3:06.50 |
| 2001 | World Indoor Championships | Lisbon, Portugal | 6th (sf) | 4 × 400 m relay | 3:10.16 NR |
| 2001 | Mediterranean Games | Tunis, Tunisia | 1st | 4 × 400 m relay | 3:07.28 |
| 2002 | European Championships | Munich, Germany | 6th | 4 × 400 m relay | 3:04.26 |
