= Darko Juričić =

Croatian hurdler

Personal information
- Born: 28 August 1969 (age 57) Zagreb, Yugoslavia

Sport
- Sport: Track and field
Medal record
Representing Croatia
Mediterranean Games
Silver medal – second place	2001 Tunis	400m hurdles

Darko Juričić (born 28 August 1969) is a retired Croatian athlete who specialised in the 400 metres hurdles. He represented his country at the 2000 Summer Olympics failing to progress to the semifinals. His biggest success was the silver medal at the 2001 Mediterranean Games.

== Competition record ==
Year	Competition	Venue	Position	Event	Notes
Representing Croatia
1997	Universiade	Catania, Italy	22nd (h)	400 m hurdles	51.36
1998	European Championships	Budapest, Hungary	12th (sf)	400 m hurdles	50.39
1999	World Indoor Championships	Maebashi, Japan	17th (h)	400 m	47.36
1999	World Championships	Seville, Spain	27th (h)	400 m hurdles	49.96
2000	Olympic Games	Sydney, Australia	56th (h)	400 m hurdles	52.39
2000	Olympic Games	Sydney, Australia	–	4 × 400 m relay	DQ
2001	Mediterranean Games	Radès, Tunisia	2nd	400 m hurdles	50.35
2001	Mediterranean Games	Radès, Tunisia	4th	4 × 400 m relay	3:08.03

== Personal bests ==
Outdoor

- 200 metres – 20.85 (Biella 1998)
- 400 metres – 46.37 (Split 1999)
- 400 metres hurdles – 49.88 (Budapest 1998) NR

Indoor

- 400 metres – 46.78 (Piraeus 1999)
