= 1992 World Junior Championships in Athletics – Women's 100 metres hurdles =

The women's 100 metres hurdles event at the 1992 World Junior Championships in Athletics was held in Seoul, South Korea, at Olympic Stadium on 17 and 18 September.

== Medalists ==
Gold	Gillian Russell; Jamaica
Silver	Damaris Anderson; Cuba
Bronze	Svetlana Laukhova; Commonwealth of Independent States

== Results ==
=== Final ===
18 September
Wind: +1.0 m/s

Rank	Name	Nationality	Time	Notes
1st place, gold medalist(s)	Gillian Russell	Jamaica	13.21	
2nd place, silver medalist(s)	Damaris Anderson	Cuba	13.43	
3rd place, bronze medalist(s)	Svetlana Laukhova	Commonwealth of Independent States	13.55	
4	Sonia Paquette	Canada	13.73	
5	Kirsten Bolm	Germany	13.75	
6	Svetla Damova	Bulgaria	13.77	
7	Dawn Burrell	United States	13.79	
	Oraidis Ramírez	Cuba	DNF	

=== Semifinals ===
17 September

==== Semifinal 1 ====
Wind: +0.5 m/s

Rank	Name	Nationality	Time	Notes
1	Gillian Russell	Jamaica	13.15	Q
2	Damaris Anderson	Cuba	13.42	Q
3	Kirsten Bolm	Germany	13.63	q
4	Erica Niculae	Romania	13.72	
5	Ryoko Jojima	Japan	13.73	
6	Martina Stoop	Switzerland	13.81	
7	Iina Pekkola	Finland	13.89	
	Verónica de Paoli	Argentina	DNF	

==== Semifinal 2 ====
Wind: +0.5 m/s

Rank	Name	Nationality	Time	Notes
1	Svetlana Laukhova	Commonwealth of Independent States	13.65	Q
2	Sonia Paquette	Canada	13.89	Q
3	Bettina Staehli	Switzerland	13.91	
4	Aneta Bednarczyk	Poland	13.94	
5	Carine Boux	Belgium	14.06	
6	Bethan Edwards	United Kingdom	14.07	
7	Megumi Tsuchiya	Japan	14.08	
8	Haïdy Aron	France	14.28	

==== Semifinal 3 ====
Wind: +0.3 m/s

Rank	Name	Nationality	Time	Notes
1	Oraidis Ramírez	Cuba	13.44	Q
2	Svetla Damova	Bulgaria	13.67	Q
3	Dawn Burrell	United States	13.68	q
4	Nadège Joseph	France	13.77	
5	Delloreen Ennis	Jamaica	13.81	
6	Hsu Hsiu-Ying	Chinese Taipei	13.82	
7	Melanie Wilkins	United Kingdom	14.03	
8	Janna Nikkel	Canada	14.15	

=== Heats ===
17 September

==== Heat 1 ====
Wind: -0.5 m/s

Rank	Name	Nationality	Time	Notes
1	Sonia Paquette	Canada	13.65	Q
2	Nadège Joseph	France	13.79	Q
3	Kirsten Bolm	Germany	13.80	Q
4	Melanie Wilkins	United Kingdom	13.90	Q
5	Patricia Naughton	Ireland	14.56	
6	Rachel Rogers	Fiji	14.76	

==== Heat 2 ====
Wind: -0.3 m/s

Rank	Name	Nationality	Time	Notes
1	Svetla Damova	Bulgaria	13.79	Q
2	Bettina Staehli	Switzerland	14.02	Q
3	Haïdy Aron	France	14.05	Q
4	Verónica de Paoli	Argentina	14.06	Q
5	Iina Pekkola	Finland	14.21	q
6	Megumi Tsuchiya	Japan	14.26	q
7	Panoraia Katsoupi	Greece	14.79	

==== Heat 3 ====
Wind: +0.9 m/s

Rank	Name	Nationality	Time	Notes
1	Oraidis Ramírez	Cuba	13.33	Q
2	Erica Niculae	Romania	13.57	Q
3	Dawn Burrell	United States	13.61	Q
4	Aneta Bednarczyk	Poland	13.84	Q
5	Delloreen Ennis	Jamaica	13.96	q
6	Jeanine Ward	Australia	14.45	
7	Mirenda Francourt	Seychelles	14.68	

==== Heat 4 ====
Wind: +0.4 m/s

Rank	Name	Nationality	Time	Notes
1	Svetlana Laukhova	Commonwealth of Independent States	13.61	Q
2	Carine Boux	Belgium	14.00	Q
3	Hsu Hsiu-Ying	Chinese Taipei	14.07	Q
4	Bethan Edwards	United Kingdom	14.11	Q
5	Katja Fust	Germany	14.29	
6	Rachel Links	Australia	14.45	
7	Lillyanne Beining	Papua New Guinea	14.68	

==== Heat 5 ====
Wind: +0.3 m/s

Rank	Name	Nationality	Time	Notes
1	Gillian Russell	Jamaica	13.25	Q
2	Damaris Anderson	Cuba	13.66	Q
3	Ryoko Jojima	Japan	13.87	Q
4	Martina Stoop	Switzerland	14.09	Q
5	Janna Nikkel	Canada	14.17	q
6	Shandelier Boyd	United States	15.05	
7	Lee Lim-Suk	South Korea	15.12	

== Participation ==
According to an unofficial count, 34 athletes from 24 countries participated in the event.

- Argentina (1)
- Australia (2)
- Belgium (1)
- Bulgaria (1)
- Canada (2)
- Chinese Taipei (1)
- Commonwealth of Independent States (1)
- Cuba (2)
- Fiji (1)
- Finland (1)
- France (2)
- Germany (2)
- Greece (1)
- Ireland (1)
- Jamaica (2)
- Japan (2)
- Papua New Guinea (1)
- Poland (1)
- Romania (1)
- Seychelles (1)
- South Korea (1)
- Switzerland (2)
- United Kingdom (2)
- United States (2)
