= 1995 Pan American Junior Athletics Championships =

VIII Pan American Junior Athletics Championships
- Dates: September 1–3
- Host city: Santiago, Chile
- Level: Junior
- Events: 42
- Participation: about 380 athletes from 20 nations

The 8th Pan American Junior Athletics Championships were held in Santiago, Chile, on September 1–3, 1995.

== Participation (unofficial) ==
Detailed result lists can be found on the "World Junior Athletics History" website. An unofficial count yields the number of about 380 athletes from about 20 countries: Argentina (32), Bahamas (5), Bolivia (2), Brazil (60), British Virgin Islands (1), Canada (28), Chile (50), Colombia (17), Costa Rica (2), Cuba (15), Dominican Republic (1), Ecuador (12), Jamaica (21), Mexico (33), Peru (4), Puerto Rico (9), Saint Kitts and Nevis (2), United States (66), Uruguay (14), Venezuela (6).

== Medal summary ==
Medal winners are published. Complete results can be found on the "World Junior Athletics History" website.

=== Men ===
Event	Gold		Silver		Bronze	
100 metres	Dave Tomlin (CAN)	10.1	Kim Collins (SKN)	10.4	Brian Raspberry (USA)	10.4
200 metres	Dave Tomlin (CAN)	20.96	Elston Cawley (JAM)	21.44	Robert Staten (USA)	21.48
400 metres	Obea Moore (USA)	45.14 WYB	Jerome Young (USA)	45.76	Shane Niemi (CAN)	46.69
800 metres	Zach Whitmarsh (CAN)	1:50.39	Eronilde Almeida (BRA)	1:50.74	Márcio da Silva (BRA)	1:50.95
1500 metres	Márcio da Silva (BRA)	3:45.80	Michael Stember (USA)	3:46.65	Rodolfo Gómez (MEX)	3:47.90
5000 metres	Miguel del Valle (MEX)	14:27.24	David Galindo (MEX)	14:29.38	José Carrasco (COL)	14:34.25
10,000 metres	David Galindo (MEX)	29:46.72	Clodoaldo da Silva (BRA)	29:51.75	Francisco Mondragón (MEX)	30:02.40
3000 metres steeplechase	Alex Greaux (PUR)	9:10.30	Richard Arias (ECU)	9:11.25	Carlos Ruiz (MEX)	9:11.81
110 metres hurdles	Anier García (CUB)	13.84	Jeremichael Williams (USA)	13.84	Maurice Wignall (JAM)	14.00
400 metres hurdles	Rodrigues Pfister (USA)	51.26	Braxton Cosby (USA)	51.36	Édson dos Reis (BRA)	52.63
4 × 100 metres relay	Jamaica; Craig McIntosh; Ricardo Williams; Lindel Frater; Elston Cawley	40.23	United States; Billy Fobbs; Brian Raspberry; Obea Moore; Jerome Young	40.28	Brazil; Cleber da Silva; Evandro de Tristão; Édson Nascimento; Paulo Poersch	41.69
4 × 400 metres relay	United States; Ricky Pfister; Obea Moore; Mark Miller; Jerome Young	3:04.27	Jamaica; Angelito Davis; Mark Neish; Omar Bailey; Rohan McDonald	3:11.51	Brazil; Eronilde de Almeida; Evandro de Tristão; Edson dos Reis; Víctor Goulart	3:13.64
10,000 metres track walk	Jesús Sánchez (MEX)	42:14.82	Francisco Pantoja (MEX)	42:43.73	Omar Aguirre (ECU)	43:24.90
High jump	Erasmo Jara (ARG)	2.18	Felipe Apablaza (CHI)	2.16	Tony Suderman (CAN)	2.13
Pole vault	Jason Pearce (USA)	5.30	Borya Orloff (USA)	5.20	Ryan Hvidston (CAN)	5.05
Long jump	Maurice Wignall (JAM)	7.75	Dominick Millner (USA)	7.71	Allan Mortimer (BAH)	7.70
Triple jump	René Hernández (CUB)	16.66	Allan Mortimer (BAH)	16.60	Gustovo Pinto (CUB)	16.52
Shot put	Bradley Snyder (CAN)	16.74	Marco Antonio Verni (CHI)	16.23	Christopher Merced (PUR)	15.50
Discus throw	Luke Sullivan (USA)	53.82	Scott McPherrin (USA)	51.64	Christopher Merced (PUR)	47.90
Hammer throw	Yosmel Montes (CUB)	65.40	Juan Cerra (ARG)	64.24	Sebastián Barlasina (ARG)	53.94
Javelin throw	Máximo Rigondeaux (CUB)	67.82	Francisco Galotto (ARG)	62.78	Allan Mortimer (BAH)	62.64
Decathlon	Tom Pappas (USA)	7198	Daniel Haag (USA)	7083	José Antonetti (PUR)	6689

=== Women ===
Event	Gold		Silver		Bronze	
100 metres	Debbie Ferguson (BAH)	11.58	Angela Williams (USA)	11.64	Margaret Fox (CAN)	11.83
200 metres	Debbie Ferguson (BAH)	23.44	Kelli White (USA)	23.93	Margaret Fox (CAN)	24.00
400 metres	Claudine Williams (JAM)	52.34	Carla Estes (USA)	55.71	Kadrina Coffee (USA)	55.99
800 metres	Mairelín Fuentes (CUB)	2:09.08	Kristie Johnson (USA)	2:10.24	Tara Mendoza (USA)	2:11.60
1500 metres	Heather De Geest (CAN)	4:22.50	Bertha Sánchez (COL)	4:27.00	Karla Betancourt (MEX)	4:28.17
3000 metres	Julia Stamps (USA)	9:30.39	Erika Olivera (CHI)	9:32.52	Bertha Sánchez (COL)	9:46.93
10,000 metres	Erika Olivera (CHI)	34:43.10	Casi Florida (USA)	35:21.67	Donna Fidler (USA)	36:10.51
100 metres hurdles	Joanna Hayes (USA)	13.69	Yolanda McCray (USA)	13.93	Maisie Haan (CAN)	14.38
400 metres hurdles	Nadia Schmiedt (CAN)	58.43	Stacy Jordan (USA)	59.72	Ángeles Pantoja (MEX)	60.00
4 × 100 metres relay	United States; Aminah Haddad; Andrea Anderson; Kelli White; Angela Williams	44.89	Jamaica; Tulia Robinson; Beverley Langley; Peta-Gaye Dowdie; Maria Brown	45.18	Colombia; Paola Restrepo; Clara Córdoba; Eyda Rentería; Elena Guerrero	46.73
4 × 400 metres relay	Jamaica; Patricia Thomas; Michelle Burgher; Donette Whyte; Claudine Williams	3:38.57	United States; Heather Hanchak; Kadrina Coffee; Andrea Anderson; Carla Estes	3:39.91	Brazil; Anice Schoulten; Maria Silva; Renata Brito ?	3:50.14
5000 metres track walk	Victoria Palacios (MEX)	23:12.16	Abigail Sáenz (MEX)	23:18.46	Ángela Aliaga (BOL)	24:32.15
High jump	Jeana McDowell (USA)	1.76	Yanisleidi Fernández (CUB)	1.76	Niurka Lussón (CUB)	1.74
Long jump	Angela Brown (USA)	6.32	Marita Hunt (USA)	6.16	Solange Witteveen (ARG)	5.67
Triple jump	Deana Simmons (USA)	12.88	LaShonda Christopher (USA)	12.43	Sorileny Quintero (VEN)	12.26
Shot put	Seilala Sua (USA)	14.13	Alisa Raymond (USA)	14.04	Josiane Soares (BRA)	13.98
Discus throw	Suzy Powell (USA)	52.98	Seilala Sua (USA)	50.22	Sami Jo Small (CAN)	48.52
Hammer throw	Doreen Heldt (USA)	45.88	Josiane Soares (BRA)	45.40	Patricia Mellodge (USA)	43.90
Javelin throw	Osleidys Menéndez (CUB)	51.30	Nora Bicet (CUB)	50.00	Ann Crouse (USA)	49.12
Heptathlon	Janet Blomstedt (USA)	5304	Sheila Acosta (PUR)	5008	Kátia da Silva (BRA)	4703

== Medal table (unofficial) ==
* Host nation (Chile)

Rank	Nation	Gold	Silver	Bronze	Total
1	United States	16	21	8	45
2	Cuba	6	2	1	9
3	Canada	6	0	7	13
4	Mexico	4	3	5	12
5	Jamaica	4	3	1	8
6	Bahamas	2	0	1	3
7	Brazil	1	4	8	13
8	Chile*	1	3	0	4
9	Argentina	1	2	2	5
10	Puerto Rico	1	1	3	5
11	Colombia	0	1	3	4
12	Ecuador	0	1	1	2
13	Saint Kitts and Nevis	0	1	0	1
14	Bolivia	0	0	1	1
14	Venezuela	0	0	1	1
Totals (15 entries)		42	42	42	126
