= Dai Tamesue =

Japanese sprinter and hurdler

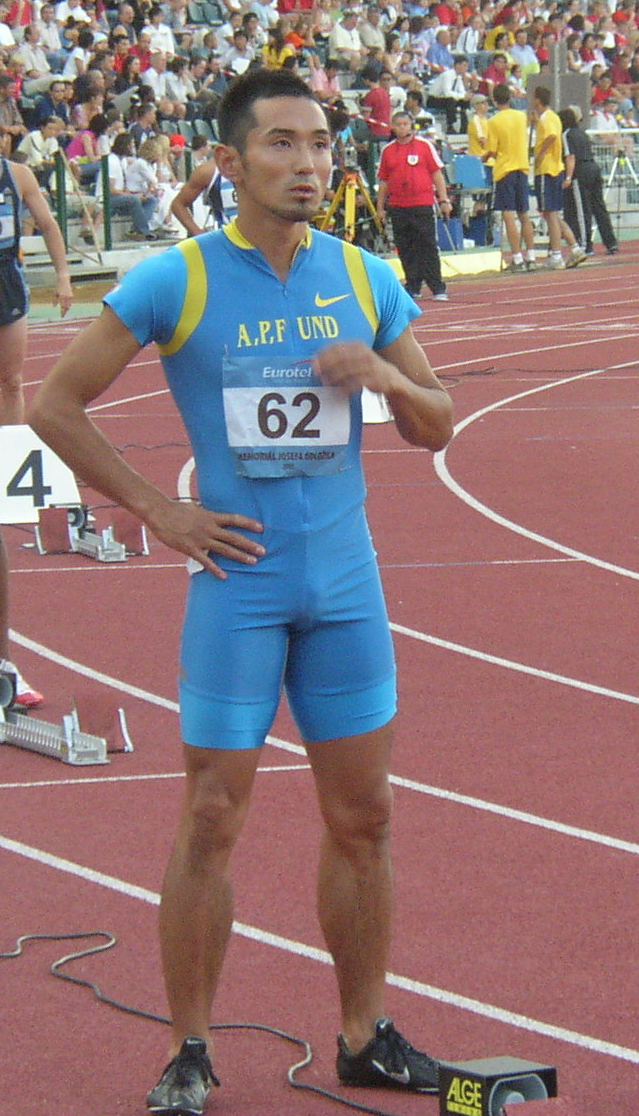
- Tamesue in 2005

Personal information
- Born: May 3, 1978 (age 48) Hiroshima, Japan

Sport
- Sport: Track and field
Medal record
Representing Japan
World Championships
Bronze medal – third place	2001 Edmonton	400 m hurdles
Bronze medal – third place	2005 Helsinki	400 m hurdles
Asian Games
Bronze medal – third place	2002 Busan	400 m hurdles

Dai Tamesue (為末大, Tamesue Dai; born May 3, 1978) is the first Japanese sprinter to win a medal in a track event at a world competition, and is the current Japanese record holder for Men's 400 meter hurdle (as of July 2021). He was the bronze medalist of the 2001 World Championships in Edmonton and 2005 World Championships in Athletics in Helsinki, behind Americans Bershawn Jackson and James Carter.

Tamesue represented Japan in the Summer Olympics three times: at Sydney (2000), Athens (2004), and Beijing (2008). He retired after 25 years of competitive athletics in 2012.

== Post-athletic career ==
Tamesue worked on ways to pass on the benefits of sports into society through associate organizations including Samurai Co., Ltd. (representative director), Athlete Society (representative director, founded 2010), Xiborg (founded 2014).

He was assigned to the Bhutan Olympic Committee (BOC) as ambassador in April 2015, and continues to support countries that are limited in Olympic medal experiences.

Tamesue's other assignments include: researcher for the Research Center for Advanced Science and Technology in Tokyo University (2014); member of the evaluation committee for the New National Stadium reconstruction planning procedure of the Ministry of Education, Culture, Sports, Science and Technology (2015); and Sports Legacy Project management committee member for the Tokyo Marathon Foundation.

In 2006, Tamesue appeared as a celebrity contestant on Quiz $ Millionaire and won the ¥10,000,000 top prize.

== Achievements ==
Year	Competition	Venue	Position	Event	Notes
Representing Japan
1996	World Junior Championships	Sydney, Australia	4th	400 m	46.03
1996	World Junior Championships	Sydney, Australia	2nd	4 × 400 m relay	3:06.01
1997	World Indoor Championships	Paris, France	6th	4 × 400 m relay	3:20.18
1999	Universiade	Palma de Mallorca, Spain	9th (sf)	400 m hurdles	49.84
2000	Olympic Games	Sydney, Australia	62nd (h)	400 m hurdles	61.81
2001	East Asian Games	Osaka, Japan	2nd	400 m hurdles	49.28
2001	East Asian Games	Osaka, Japan	1st	4 × 400 m relay	3:03.74
2001	World Championships	Edmonton, Canada	3rd	400 m hurdles	47.89
2001	World Championships	Edmonton, Canada	13th (h)	4 × 400 m relay	3:02.75
2002	Asian Games	Busan, South Korea	3rd	400 m hurdles	49.29
2002	Asian Games	Busan, South Korea	4th	4 × 400 m relay	3:05.85
2003	World Championships	Paris, France	18th (sf)	400 m hurdles	49.37
2004	Olympic Games	Athens, Greece	10th (sf)	400 m hurdles	48.46
2005	World Championships	Helsinki, Finland	3rd	400 m hurdles	48.10
2007	World Championships	Osaka, Japan	21st (h)	400 m hurdles	49.67
2008	Olympic Games	Beijing, China	19th (h)	400 m hurdles	49.82
2008	Olympic Games	Beijing, China	14th (h)	4 × 400 m relay	3:04.18
