= Michael Campbell (sprinter) =

Jamaican sprinter (born 1978)

Medal record

Athletics

Representing Jamaica

CAC Junior Championships (U20)
Gold medal – first place	1996 San Salvador	4x400 m relay

CARIFTA Games Junior (U20)
Gold medal – first place	1996 Kingston	400m
Silver medal – second place	1997 Bridgetown	400m

Michael Campbell (born 11 September 1978 in Kingston) is a retired male track and field sprinter from Jamaica.

== Career ==
He specialized in the 200 metres and the 400 metres during his career. His personal best time in the men's 200 metres was 21.07 seconds, achieved on 30 May 2004 in Sacramento, California. Campbell won a gold medal in the men's 4 × 400 m relay at the 2003 Pan American Games, alongside Sanjay Ayre, Lansford Spence, and Davian Clarke.

== Achievements ==
Year	Competition	Venue	Position	Event	Notes
Representing Jamaica
1996	CARIFTA Games (U-20)	Kingston, Jamaica	1st	400 m	46.92
1996	Central American and Caribbean Junior Championships (U-20)	San Salvador, El Salvador	7th	400 m	48.22
1996	Central American and Caribbean Junior Championships (U-20)	San Salvador, El Salvador	1st	4 × 400 m relay	3:09.67
1996	World Junior Championships	Sydney, Australia	19th (sf)	400m	48.04
1996	World Junior Championships	Sydney, Australia	7th	4 × 400 m relay	3:09.04
1997	CARIFTA Games (U-20)	Bridgetown, Barbados	2nd	400 m	47.33
2003	Pan American Games	Santo Domingo, Dominican Republic	7th	400 m	46.10
2003	Pan American Games	Santo Domingo, Dominican Republic	1st	4 × 400 m relay	3:01.81
2003	World Championships	Paris, France	2nd	4 × 400 m relay	3:01.37 (h)
2004	Olympic Games	Athens, Greece	—	4 × 400 m relay	DSQ
