= Meta Mačus =

Slovenian sprinter

Personal information
- Nationality: Slovenian
- Born: 25 March 1975 (age 50)

Sport
- Sport: Sprinting
- Event: 4 × 400 metres relay

Meta Mačus (born 25 March 1975) is a Slovenian sprinter. She competed in the women's 4 × 400 metres relay at the 2000 Summer Olympics.
