= Vukosava Đapić =

Serbian sprinter

Personal information
- Nationality: Serbian
- Born: 21 January 1978 (age 48)

Sport
- Sport: Sprinting
- Event: 100 metres

Vukosava Đapić (born 21 January 1978) is a Serbian sprinter. She competed in the women's 100 metres at the 2000 Summer Olympics representing Yugoslavia.
