= Sofiane Labidi =

Tunisian sprinter (born 1977)

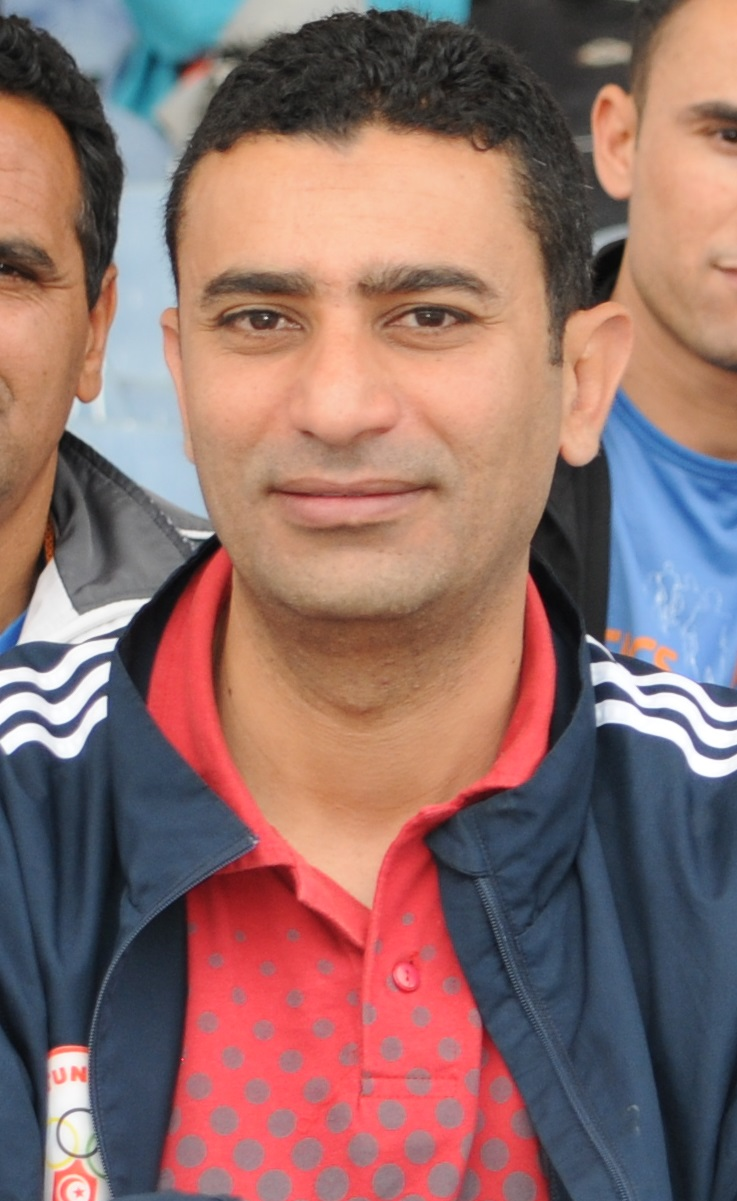
- Labidi in 2016

Medal record

Men's athletics

Representing Tunisia

African Championships
Silver medal – second place	2002 Radès	400 m
Bronze medal – third place	2000 Algiers	400 m

Sofiane Labidi (Arabic: سفيان العبيدي; born 29 September 1977 in Béja) is a Tunisian sprinter who specialises in the 400 metres. He achieved his personal best time of 45.19 seconds in Seville in June 2004. He represented his country at the 2000 and 2004 Summer Olympic Games.

He missed the 1997 season due to injury, then missed 1998 due to a hepatitis b infection.

He was the coach of the Tunisian national sprint and hurdles team from 2011 to 2013.

== International competitions ==
Year	Competition	Venue	Position	Event	Notes
Representing Tunisia
1996	World Junior Championships	Sydney, Australia	10th (semis)	400 m	47.24 NJR
1996	Arab Junior Championships	Latakia, Syria	1st	200 m	21:68 NJR
1996	Arab Junior Championships	Latakia, Syria	1st	400 m	46:77 NJR / CR
1996	Arab Junior Championships	Latakia, Syria	2nd	4×400 m relay	3:13.1
1999	Pan Arab Games	Irbid, Jordan	2nd	400 metres	45.9
2000	African Championships	Algiers, Algeria	3rd	400 m	45.81
2000	Olympic Games	Sydney, Australia	7th (q-finals)	400 metres	46.01
2001	World Military Championships	Beirut, Lebanon	1st	400 metres	45:40 WMR
2001	Jeux de la Francophonie	Ottawa, Canada	3rd	400 metres	45.45
2001	Mediterranean Games	Radès, Tunisia	2nd	400 m	46.33
2002	African Championships	Radès, Tunisia	2nd	400 m	45.87
2003	All-Africa Games	Abuja, Nigeria	3rd	400 m	45.42
2004	World Indoor Championships	Budapest, Hungary	4th	400 m	46.48
2004	Olympic Games	Athens, Greece	3rd (heats)	400 metres	46.04
2005	Mediterranean Games	Almería, Spain	1st	400 m	45.60
2007	Pan Arab Games	Cairo, Egypt	3rd	4×400 m relay	3:06.83
2008	African Championships	Addis Ababa, Ethiopia	—	400 metres	DNF (semis)
