= Thalia Iakovidou =

Greek pole vaulter (born 1972)

Personal information
- Nationality: Greek
- Born: 10 September 1972 (age 53) Athens, Greece

Sport
- Sport: Athletics
- Event: Pole vault

Thalia Iakovidou (Greek: Θάλεια Ιακωβίδου, born 10 September 1972) is a Greek athlete. She competed in the women's pole vault at the 2000 Summer Olympics.
