= Nino Habun =

Croatian sprinter

Personal information
- Nationality: Croatian
- Born: 30 May 1979 (age 47)

Sport
- Sport: Sprinting
- Event: 4 × 400 metres relay

Nino Habun (born 30 May 1979) is a Croatian sprinter. He competed in the men's 4 × 400 metres relay at the 2000 Summer Olympics.
