= Evfrosyni Patsou =

Greek sprinter (born 1974)

Personal information
- Nationality: Greek
- Born: 5 June 1974 (age 51)

Sport
- Sport: Sprinting
- Event: 4 × 100 metres relay

Evfrosyni Patsou (born 5 June 1974) is a Greek sprinter. She competed in the 4 × 100 metres relay at the 2000 Summer Olympics and the 2004 Summer Olympics.
