= Anna Visigalli =

Italian long jumper

Personal information
- National team: Italy: 2 caps (2001-2002)
- Born: 24 February 1981 (age 45) Lodi, Italy

Sport
- Sport: Athletics
- Event: High jump
- Club: Atletica Fanfulla

Achievements and titles
- Personal best: High jump (i): 1.90 m (2001)
Medal record
Mediterranean Games
Bronze medal – third place	2001 Tunis	High jump

Anna Visigalli (born 24 February 1981) is a retired Italian high jumper.

== Career ==
She won the bronze medal at the 2001 Mediterranean Games. She also competed at the 2005 European Indoor Championships without reaching the final. She became Italian champion in 2002 and 2004 as well as Italian indoor champion 2002 and 2005. Her personal best jump was 1.89 metres, achieved in June 2004 in Pescara. Indoors she managed 1.90 metres, in February 2001 in Ancona.
