= Fabiola Piroddi =

Italian sprinter

Personal information
- Nationality: Italian
- Born: 23 May 1969 (age 56) Cagliari, Italy

Sport
- Sport: Sprinting
- Event: 4 × 400 metres relay

Fabiola Piroddi (born 23 May 1969) is an Italian former sprinter. She competed in the women's 4 × 400 metres relay at the 2000 Summer Olympics.
