= Frano Bakarić =

Croatian sprinter

Personal information
- Nationality: Croatian
- Born: 31 August 1977 (age 49) Split, Yugoslavia
- Height: 184 cm (6 ft 0 in)
- Weight: 74 kg (163 lb)

Sport
- Sport: Sprinting
- Event: 4 × 400 metres relay
- Club: HAJ

Frano Bakarić (born 31 August 1977) is a Croatian sprinter. He competed in the men's 4 × 400 metres relay at the 2000 Summer Olympics.
