= Nicola Trentin =

Italian long jumper

Personal information
- Nationality: Italian
- Born: June 20, 1974 (age 52) Iglesias, Italy
- Height: 1.78 m (5 ft 10 in)
- Weight: 70 kg (154 lb)

Sport
- Country: Italy
- Sport: Athletics
- Event: Long jump
- Club: G.S. Fiamme Azzurre

Achievements and titles
- Personal best: Long jump: 8.20 m (2003)
Medal record
Mediterranean Games
Bronze medal – third place	2001 Tunis	Long jump

Nicola Trentin (born 20 June 1974) is a former Italian long jumper.

== Biography ==
He won the bronze medal at the 2001 Mediterranean Games. He also participated at the World Championships in 1999 and 2003, the World Indoor Championships in 2004 and the 2004 Olympic Games without reaching the final.

His personal best jump is 8.20 metres, achieved in July 2003 in Padua. The Italian record currently belongs to Andrew Howe with 8.47 metres. He has 21 caps in national team from 1996 to 2006.

== Achievements ==
Year	Competition	Venue	Position	Event	Measure	Notes
2004	Olympic Games	(Greece) Athens	Qual.	Long jump	7.86 m	
2006	European Championships	(Sweden) Gothenburg	19th	Long jump	7.66 m	

== National titles ==
He has won 6 times the individual national championship.

- 3 wins in the long jump (2001, 2002, 2003)
- 3 wins in the long jump indoor (1998, 2003, 2004)

== See also ==
- Italian all-time lists - Long jump
