= Obea Moore =

American sprinter

Personal information
- Nationality: American
- Born: January 10, 1979 (age 47)
- Height: 5 ft 9 in (1.75 m)
- Weight: 160 lb (73 kg)

Sport
- Sport: Track and field
- Event(s): 200 metres, 400 metres
- Coached by: James Robertson

Achievements and titles
- Personal best(s): 100 m: 10.54 (1996); 200 m: 20.77 (Norwalk 1996); 400 m: 45.14 (Santiago 1995); 800 m: 1:49.16 (Arcadia 1995)
Medal record
Men's Athletics
Representing the United States
World Junior Championships
Gold medal – first place	1996 Sydney	400 m
Gold medal – first place	1996 Sydney	4×100 m relay
Gold medal – first place	1996 Sydney	4×400 m relay
Pan American Junior Championships
Gold medal – first place	1995 Santiago	400 m
Gold medal – first place	1995 Santiago	4×400 m relay
Silver medal – second place	1995 Santiago	4×100 m relay

William Obea Moore (born January 10, 1979) is a former American sprinter. Particularly excelling in the 400 metres, Moore held the World Youth Best in this event for nearly 24 years. He was expected to be the next great American quarter miler, to follow Michael Johnson as Olympic champion, but never lived up to the expectations.

Starting as an eight-year-old, running for the Los Angeles Jets youth club under coach James Robertson, Moore went on to set American youth records in the Bantam (9–10), the Midget (11–12), the Youth (13–14), and the Intermediate division (15–16)—some of which are still standing—, adding the 200 metres record in the Intermediate division, and was part of the 4 × 400 metres relay team in the Youth division.

Moore ran for John Muir High School in Pasadena, California, though his mother arranged for him to continue to run under Robertson. His freshman year, his team won the CIF California State Meet 4x400 relay. In 1995, his sophomore year, Moore won the 400, beating future World Champion, Tyree Washington by a half a second. He was also second in the 200 and again anchored his team to winning the relay in remarkable come from behind fashion. Later in the season, he represented the United States at the 1995 Pan American Junior Athletics Championships in Santiago, Chile, where he set the former World Youth Best in the 400 metres at 45.14.

And the following year Moore won both the 400, 200 and anchored the relay to the state meet record. At major relay events around the country, including the Penn Relays, Moore became a trackside legend as one of the best, a high school junior being clocked doing 45 second laps. He was Track and Field News "High School Athlete of the Year" in 1996.

With high expectations of having a chance to be the first high school athlete to qualify for the Olympics since Dwayne Evans and Lam Jones in 1976, Moore qualified for the 1996 U.S. Olympic Trials. Those dreams were dashed by a 14th place finish in the semi-finals. Later in 1996, Moore won the World Junior Championships in Sydney, Australia under cool conditions. Moore expected many better things to come.

Moore looked at 1997, his senior year of high school, as the chance to set records out of sight. Instead, he suffered a minor injury early in the season. Still focused on setting records, Moore ignored the problem and continued to press. Some have also suggested Moore lost focus. However, the effects of expectations and celebrity certainly were a factor on the 17 year old's life. After three months of abusing his body, he reached the point where he could barely walk. As a result, records and championships were out of the question.

Moore aspired to go to nearby powerhouse University of Southern California, but his SAT and then ACT scores left him .1 point away from eligibility. In order to improve his academic standing Moore went first to Pasadena City College, then Long Beach City College. Further attempts took him across the country to Morehouse College. Moore spent his time in injury rehabilitation. His heart and aspirations were still in Southern California. He left Morehouse a year later. The following year, Moore ended up at Life University, an NAIA college. After a successful and healthy fall training season, he entered the Pomona Pitzer Invitational, a tune up meet before the Mt. SAC Relays. Facing serious competition from people with marks equivalent to Moore's high school junior accomplishments, Moore pulled out of the race at the last minute.

"He couldn't go to the line," recalls then Life University head coach Mark Spino. "If he just was even around, people had such high expectations of him, it was hard for him to start anyplace and very hard for him to have intermediary goals."

Awards
Preceded by Jerome Young	Track & Field News High School Boys Athlete of the Year; 1996	Succeeded by Terrence Trammell
Records
Preceded by (United States) William Reed	Boys' World Youth Best Holder, 400 metres 2 September 1995 – 8 June 2019	Succeeded by (United States) Justin Robinson
