= Botswana at the 1988 Summer Olympics =

- IOC code: BOT
- NOC: Botswana National Olympic Committee

in Seoul
- Competitors: 8 men in 2 sports
- Flag bearer: Shakes Kubuitsile
- Medals: Gold 0 Silver 0 Bronze 0 Total 0

Summer Olympics appearances (overview)
- 1980; 1984; 1988; 1992; 1996; 2000; 2004; 2008; 2012; 2016; 2020; 2024

Botswana was represented at the 1988 Summer Olympics in Seoul, South Korea by the Botswana National Olympic Committee.

In total, eight athletes – all men – represented Botswana in two different sports including athletics and boxing.

== Competitors ==
In total, eight athletes represented Botswana at the 1988 Summer Olympics in Seoul, South Korea across two different sports.

| Sport | Men | Women | Total |
|---|---|---|---|
| Athletics | 6 | 0 | 6 |
| Boxing | 2 | – | 2 |
| Total | 8 | 0 | 8 |

== Athletics ==
In total, six Botswanan athletes participated in the athletics events – Bobby Gaseitsiwe, Benny Kgarametso, Bigboy Josie Matlapeng, Sunday Maweni, Joseph Ramotshabi and Mbiganyi Thee.

The heats for the men's 800 m took place on 23 September 1988. Gaseitsiwe finished fourth in his heat in a time of one minute 48.08 seconds and he did not advance to the quarter-finals.

The heats for the men's 400 m took place on 24 September 1988. Maweni finished fourth in his heat in a time of 47.97 seconds and he did not advance to the quarter-finals.

The heats for the men's 200 m took place on 26 September 1988. Kgarametso finished sixth in his heat in a time of 22.79 seconds and he did not advance to the quarter-finals.

The heats for the men's 1,500 m took place on 29 September 1988. Thee finished eighth in his heat in a time of three minutes 41.97 seconds and he advanced to the semi-finals as one of the fastest losers. The semi-finals took place on 30 September 1988. Thee finished 10th in his heat in a time of three minutes 42.62 seconds and he did not advance to the finals.

The heats for the men's 4 x 400 m relay took place on 30 September 1988. Botswana finished seventh in their heat in a time of three minutes 13.16 seconds and they did not advance to the semi-finals.

The men's marathon took place on 2 October 1988. Matlapeng completed the course in two hours 20 minutes 51 seconds to finish 34th overall.

| Athlete | Event | Heat | | Quarterfinal | | Semifinal | | Final | |
| Athlete | Event | Result | Rank | Result | Rank | Result | Rank | Result | Rank |
|---|---|---|---|---|---|---|---|---|---|
| Benny Kgarametso | 200 metres | 22.79 | 69 | Did not advance | | | | | |
| Sunday Maweni | 400 metres | 47.97 | 43 | Did not advance | | | | | |
| Bobby Gaseitsiwe | 800 metres | 1:48.08 | 33 | Did not advance | | | | | |
| Mbiganyi Thee | 1,500 metres | 3:41.97 | 21 q | — | | 3:42.62 | 19 | Did not advance | |
| Bigboy Josie Matlapeng | Marathon | — | | | | | | 2:20:51 | 34 |
| Joseph Ramotshabi; Bobby Gaseitsiwe; Benny Kgarametso; Sunday Maweni | 4 × 400 metres relay | 3:13.16 | 21 | — | | Did not advance | | | |

== Boxing ==
In total, two Botswanan athletes participated in the boxing events – Shakes Kubuitsile in the lightweight category and Magare Tshekiso in the bantamweight category.

The first round of the bantamweight category took place on 17 September 1988. Tshekiso lost to René Breitbarth of East Germany.

The first round of the lightweight category took place on 19 September 1988. Kubuitsile received a bye to the second round. The second round took place on 23 September 1988. Kubuitsile lost to Saïd of Algeria.

| Athlete | Event | Round of 64 | Round of 32 | Round of 16 | Quarterfinals | Semifinals | Final | |
| Athlete | Event | Opposition Result | Opposition Result | Opposition Result | Opposition Result | Opposition Result | Opposition Result | Rank |
|---|---|---|---|---|---|---|---|---|
| Magare Tshekiso | Bantamweight | Breitbarth (GDR); L 0–5 | Did not advance | | | | | |
| Shakes Kubuitsile | Lightweight | Bye | Saïd (ALG); L RSC R1 | Did not advance | | | | |

== See also ==
- Botswana at the 1986 Commonwealth Games
- Botswana at the 1990 Commonwealth Games
