= Botswana at the 1984 Summer Olympics =

- IOC code: BOT
- NOC: Botswana National Olympic Committee

in Los Angeles
- Competitors: 7 (7 men and 0 women) in 2 sports
- Flag bearer: Norman Mangoye
- Medals: Gold 0 Silver 0 Bronze 0 Total 0

Summer Olympics appearances (overview)
- 1980; 1984; 1988; 1992; 1996; 2000; 2004; 2008; 2012; 2016; 2020; 2024; 2028

Botswana took part in the 1984 Summer Olympics, which were held in Los Angeles. This would be Botswana's second appearance at the Olympics. Seven athletes were sent to participate in the Olympics.

== Background ==
The 1984 Summer Olympics were Botswana's second Summer Olympics, with the first being the 1980 Games in Moscow.

== Athletics ==
Men's 400 metres

- Joseph Ramotshabi
  - Heat — 48.11 (→ did not advance)

Men's Marathon

- Wilson Theleso — 2:29:20 (→ 55th place)
- Johnson Mbangiwa — 2:48:12 (→ 76th place)
- Bigboy Matlapeng — did not finish (→ no ranking)

== See also ==
- Botswana at the 1982 Commonwealth Games
- Botswana at the 1986 Commonwealth Games
