= Botswana at the 2008 Summer Olympics =

- IOC code: BOT
- NOC: Botswana National Olympic Committee

in Beijing
- Competitors: 12 in 3 sports
- Flag bearers: Samantha Paxinos (opening); Khumiso Ikgopoleng (closing)
- Medals: Gold 0 Silver 0 Bronze 0 Total 0

Summer Olympics appearances (overview)
- 1980; 1984; 1988; 1992; 1996; 2000; 2004; 2008; 2012; 2016; 2020; 2024

Botswana competed in the 2008 Summer Olympics which were held in Beijing, People's Republic of China from August 8 to August 24, 2008.

== Athletics ==
Men
Track & road events

Athlete	Event	Heat		Quarterfinal		Semifinal		Final	
Athlete	Event	Result	Rank	Result	Rank	Result	Rank	Result	Rank
Onalenna Baloyi	800 m	1:47.89	4	—		Did not advance			
Ndabili Bashingili	Marathon	—						2:25:11	56
Fanuel Kenosi	200 m	21.09	5	Did not advance					
Gakologelwang Masheto	400 m	46.29	8	—		Did not advance			
California Molefe	400 m	DNS		—		Did not advance			

Field events

Athlete	Event	Qualification		Final	
Athlete	Event	Distance	Position	Distance	Position
Gable Garenamotse	Long jump	7.95	11 q	7.85	9
Kabelo Kgosiemang	High jump	2.20	=29	Did not advance	

Women
Track & road events

Athlete	Event	Heat		Semifinal		Final	
Athlete	Event	Result	Rank	Result	Rank	Result	Rank
Amantle Montsho	400 m	50.91	2 Q	50.54	2 Q	51.18	8

Key

- Note–Ranks given for track events are within the athlete's heat only
- Q = Qualified for the next round
- q = Qualified for the next round as a fastest loser or, in field events, by position without achieving the qualifying target
- NR = National record
- N/A = Round not applicable for the event
- Bye = Athlete not required to compete in round

== Boxing ==
Botswana qualified two boxers for the Olympic boxing tournament. Ikgopoleng qualified in the bantamweight at the first African qualifying event. Batshegi qualified in the featherweight at the second African event.

Athlete	Event	Round of 32	Round of 16	Quarterfinals	Semifinals	Final	
Athlete	Event	Opposition Result	Opposition Result	Opposition Result	Opposition Result	Opposition Result	Rank
Khumiso Ikgopoleng	Bantamweight	Boyd (AUS); W 18–8	Mesbahi (MAR); W RSC	Badar-Uugan (MGL); L 2–15	Did not advance		
Thato Batshegi	Featherweight	Izoria (GEO); L 4–14	Did not advance				

== Swimming ==
Qualifiers for the latter rounds of all events were decided on a time only basis, therefore positions shown are overall results versus competitors in all heats.

Men

Athlete	Event	Heat		Semifinal		Final	
Athlete	Event	Time	Rank	Time	Rank	Time	Rank
John Kamyuka	50 m freestyle	25.54	72	Did not advance			

Women

Athlete	Event	Heat		Semifinal		Final	
Athlete	Event	Time	Rank	Time	Rank	Time	Rank
Samantha Paxinos	50 m freestyle	29.91	70	Did not advance			

== See also ==
- Botswana at the 2006 Commonwealth Games
- Botswana at the 2008 Summer Paralympics
- Botswana at the 2010 Commonwealth Games
