= Cook Islands at the Commonwealth Games =

- Flag of the Cook Islands
- CGF code: COK
- CGA: Cook Islands Sports and National Olympic Committee
- Website: www.oceaniasport.com/cookis
- Medals: Gold 0 Silver 0 Bronze 1 Total 1

Commonwealth Games appearances (overview)
- 1974; 1978; 1982; 1986; 1990; 1994; 1998; 2002; 2006; 2010; 2014; 2018; 2022; 2026; 2030

The Cook Islands has competed in eleven of the Commonwealth Games to date.

The Cooks' first Commonwealth Games medal was won in 2018 by lawn bowlers Taiki Paniani and Aidan Zittersteijn.

== Medal tally ==
	(gold)	(silver)	(bronze)	Total
The Cook Islands	0	0	1	1

== History ==
The Cook Islands first participated in the 1974 Commonwealth Games held at Christchurch, New Zealand, missed the 1982 games, but has participated in all the games from 1986 onwards.

== List of medalists ==
Medal	Name	Games	Sport	Event
Bronze	Taiki Paniani; Aidan Zittersteijn	2018 Gold Coast	Lawn bowls	Men's pairs
