= Botswana at the 1992 Summer Olympics =

- IOC code: BOT
- NOC: Botswana National Olympic Committee

in Barcelona
- Competitors: 6 in 2 sports
- Medals: Gold 0 Silver 0 Bronze 0 Total 0

Summer Olympics appearances (overview)
- 1980; 1984; 1988; 1992; 1996; 2000; 2004; 2008; 2012; 2016; 2020; 2024

Botswana competed at the 1992 Summer Olympics in Barcelona, Spain.

== Competitors ==
The following is the list of number of competitors in the Games.

Sport	Men	Women	Total
Athletics	5	0	5
Boxing	1	–	1
Total	6	0	6

== Athletics ==
Men
Track and road events

Athlete	Event	Heats		Quarterfinal		Semifinal		Final	
Athlete	Event	Result	Rank	Result	Rank	Result	Rank	Result	Rank
Camera Ntereke	400 metres	47.32	46	DId not advance					
Mbiganyi Thee	800 metres	1:48.04	20 q	—		1:46.13	10	Did not advance	
Bobby Gaseitsiwe	1500 metres	3:48.33	37	—		Did not advance			
Zachariah Ditetso	5000 metres	13:54.88	31	—				Did not advance	
Benjamin Keleketu	Marathon	—						2:45:57	83

== Boxing ==
Athlete	Event	Round of 32	Round of 16	Quarterfinals	Semifinals	Final	
Athlete	Event	Opposition Result	Opposition Result	Opposition Result	Opposition Result	Opposition Result	Rank
France Mabiletsa	Light heavyweight	Griffin (USA); L 4–10	Did not advance				

== See also ==
- Botswana at the 1990 Commonwealth Games
- Botswana at the 1994 Commonwealth Games

== Sources ==
- Official Olympic Reports
- sports-reference
