= Botswana at the 2006 Commonwealth Games =

- CGF code: BOT
- CGA: Botswana National Olympic Committee
- Website: bnoc.org.bw

in Melbourne, Australia
- Competitors: 21 in 3 sports
- Flag bearers: Opening: Closing:
- Medals Ranked =27thth: Gold 0 Silver 1 Bronze 1 Total 2

Commonwealth Games appearances (overview)
- 1974; 1978; 1982; 1986; 1990; 1994; 1998; 2002; 2006; 2010; 2014; 2018; 2022; 2026; 2030

Botswana was represented at the 2006 Commonwealth Games in Melbourne by a xx-member strong contingent comprising 21 sportspersons and xx officials.

== Medals ==
=== Silver ===
- Gable Garenamotse, Athletics, Men's Long Jump

=== Bronze ===
- Mmoloki Nogeng, Boxing, Bantamweight 54 kg

== Results by event ==
=== Athletics ===
- Gable Garenamotse
- Johnson Kubisa
- Gakologelwang Masheto
- Tlhalosang Molapisi
- California Molefe
- Amantle Montsho
- Oganeditse Moseki
- Obakeng Ngwigwa
- Onalenna Oabona
- Onnanye Ramohube

=== Bowls ===
- Tirelo Snankie Buckley
- Lebogang Moroke
- Ivy Malefsane Motlhatlhedi
- Sheila Spring

=== Boxing ===
Men's Light Flyweight (– 48 kg)

- Michael Rantsho

Men's Flyweight (– 51 kg)

- Lechedzani Luza

Men's Bantamweight (– 54 kg)

- Mmoloki Nogeng

Men's Featherweight (– 57 kg)

- Thato Batshegi

Men's Lightweight (– 60 kg)

- Gomotsang Gaasite

Men's Light Welterweight (– 64 kg)

- Herbert Nkabiti

Men's Welterweight (– 69 kg)

- Moabi Mothiba

== See also ==
- Botswana at the 2004 Summer Olympics
- Botswana at the 2008 Summer Olympics
