= Botswana at the 2014 Commonwealth Games =

- CGF code: BOT
- CGA: Botswana National Olympic Committee
- Website: bnoc.org.bw

in Glasgow, Scotland
- Competitors: 18 in 6 sports
- Flag bearer: Nigel Amos
- Medals Ranked =20th: Gold 1 Silver 0 Bronze 0 Total 1

Commonwealth Games appearances (overview)
- 1974; 1978; 1982; 1986; 1990; 1994; 1998; 2002; 2006; 2010; 2014; 2018; 2022; 2026; 2030

Botswana competed in the 2014 Commonwealth Games in Glasgow, Scotland from July 23 to August 3, 2014.

== Medalists ==
Medal	Name	Sport	Event	Date
Gold	Nijel Amos	Athletics	Men's 800 metres	July 31

== Athletics ==
In the women's 400 metres final, Botswana's Amantle Montsho placed fourth; she was subsequently suspended after failing a doping test.

Men
Track and road events

Athlete	Event	Heat		Semifinal		Final	
Athlete	Event	Result	Rank	Result	Rank	Result	Rank
Isaac Makwala	400 m	45.33	1 Q	45.57	9	did not advance	
Pako Seribe	400 m	46.64	19 Q	47.43	21	did not advance	
Nijel Amos	800 m	1:50.56	15 Q	1:45.65	1 Q	1:45.18	1st place, gold medalist(s)

Field events

Athlete	Event	Qualifying		Final	
Athlete	Event	Result	Rank	Result	Rank
Kabelo Kgosiemang	High jump	2.20	1 q	2.21	5

Women

Athlete	Event	Heat		Semifinal		Final	
Athlete	Event	Result	Rank	Result	Rank	Result	Rank
Amantle Montsho	400 m	DSQ - Doping					

== Badminton ==
Men

Athlete	Event	Round of 64	Round of 32	Round of 16	Quarterfinals	Semifinals	Final
Athlete	Event	Opposition Result	Opposition Result	Opposition Result	Opposition Result	Opposition Result	Opposition Result
Gaone Tawana	Singles	D Font (WAL); L 0 - 2	did not advance				

== Boxing ==
Men

Athlete	Event	Round of 32	Round of 16	Quarterfinals	Semifinals	Final	
Athlete	Event	Opposition Result	Opposition Result	Opposition Result	Opposition Result	Opposition Result	Rank
Mooketsi Lekgetho	Light flyweight	Bye	Keama (PNG); L 0 - 3	did not advance			
Oteng Oteng	Flyweight	Bye	Blackman (BAR); W KO2	McFadden (SCO); L 0 - 3	did not advance		
Kagiso Bagwasi	Light welterweight	Taylor (SCO); L 0 - 3	did not advance				
Mmusi Tswiige	Welterweight	Paneng (LES); W 3 - 0	Morgan (NZL); L 1 - 2	did not advance			
Thabang Motsewabeng	Light heavyweight	Ochola (KEN); L 1 - 2	did not advance				

Women

Athlete	Event	Round of 16	Quarterfinals	Semifinals	Final	
Athlete	Event	Opposition Result	Opposition Result	Opposition Result	Opposition Result	Rank
Keneilwe Rakhudu	Lightweight	Bye	Machongua (MOZ); L 1 - 2	did not advance		
Pearl Morake	Middleweight	Bye	Marshall (ENG); L 0 - 3	did not advance		

== Judo ==
Women

Athlete	Event	Round of 16	Quarterfinals	Semifinals	Repechage	Bronze Medal	Final	
Athlete	Event	Opposition Result	Opposition Result	Opposition Result	Opposition Result	Opposition Result	Opposition Result	Rank
Memory Zikhale	-70 kg	S Huidrom (IND); L 0000-1000	did not advance					

== Squash ==
Men
Individual

Athlete	Event	Round of 128	Round of 64	Round of 32	Round of 16	Quarterfinals	Semifinals	Final
Athlete	Event	Opposition Score	Opposition Score	Opposition Score	Opposition Score	Opposition Score	Opposition Score	Opposition Score
Alister Walker	Men's Singles	Bye	D Gunawardena (SRI); W 3-0	C Stafford (CAY); W 3-1	I Yuen (MAS); L 1-3	did not advance		

== Table tennis ==
Men

Athlete	Event	Group Stage				Round of 64	Round of 32	Round of 16	Quarterfinals	Semifinals	Final	
Athlete	Event	Opposition Result	Opposition Result	Opposition Result	Rank	Opposition Result	Opposition Result	Opposition Result	Opposition Result	Opposition Result	Opposition Result	Rank
Thobo Matlhatsi	Singles	Muturi (KEN); L 0 - 4	Powell (AUS); L 0 - 4	—	3	did not advance						

Women

Athlete	Event	Group Stage				Round of 64	Round of 32	Round of 16	Quarterfinals	Semifinals	Final	
Athlete	Event	Opposition Result	Opposition Result	Opposition Result	Rank	Opposition Result	Opposition Result	Opposition Result	Opposition Result	Opposition Result	Opposition Result	Rank
Boitshwarelo Butale	Singles	Sheikh (PAK); L 2 - 4	Akpan (NGR); L 0 - 4	—	3	did not advance						
Magdeline Tshepiso Rebatenne	Singles	Kwabi (GHA); L 1 - 4	Edghill (GUY); L 0 - 4	—	3	did not advance						
Boitshwarelo Butale; Magdeline Tshepiso Rebatenne	Doubles	—				Trinidad and Tobago; L 0 - 3	did not advance					

Mixed

Athlete	Event	Round of 128	Round of 64	Round of 32	Round of 16	Quarterfinals	Semifinals	Final	Rank
Athlete	Event	Opposition Result	Opposition Result	Opposition Result	Opposition Result	Opposition Result	Opposition Result	Opposition Result	Rank
Boitshwarelo Butale; Thobo Matlhatsi	Mixed Doubles	Guyana; W w/o	Canada; L 0 - 3	did not advance					
