= Botswana at the 2002 Commonwealth Games =

- CGF code: BOT
- CGA: Botswana National Olympic Committee
- Website: bnoc.org.bw

in Manchester, England
- Competitors: 17 in 3 sports
- Flag bearers: Opening: Closing:
- Medals Ranked =29thth: Gold 0 Silver 2 Bronze 1 Total 3

Commonwealth Games appearances (overview)
- 1974; 1978; 1982; 1986; 1990; 1994; 1998; 2002; 2006; 2010; 2014; 2018; 2022; 2026; 2030

Botswana competed at the 2002 Commonwealth Games. The African nation sent seventeen athletes in three sports. For the first time in their Commonwealth Games history, Botswana won multiple medals, capturing three, including two in boxing.

== Medals ==
=== Silver ===
Athletics:

(silver) Gable Garenamotse — Men's Long Jump

Boxing:

(silver) Lechedzani Luza — Men's Flyweight (– 51 kg)

=== Bronze ===
Boxing:

(bronze) Gilbert Khunwane — Men's Lightweight (– 60 kg)

== Results by event ==
=== Athletics ===
- Lulu Basinyi
- Glody Dube
- Gable Garenamotse
- Johnson Kubisa
- Otukile Lekote
- California Molefe
- Oganeditse Moseki

=== Badminton ===
- Joyce Malebogo Arone
- Makhula Makhula
- Mmoloki Motlhala
- Oreeditse Thela
- Leungo Tshweneetsile

=== Boxing ===
Men's Flyweight (– 51 kg)

- Lechedzani Luza

Men's Bantamweight (– 54 kg)

- Khumiso Ikgopoleng

Men's Featherweight (– 57 kg)

- Leslie Sekotswe

Men's Lightweight (– 60 kg)

- Gilbert Khunwane

Men's Light Welterweight (– 63.5 kg)

- Dintwa Sloca

== See also ==
- Botswana at the 2000 Summer Olympics
- Botswana at the 2004 Summer Olympics
