= Botswana at the 1998 Commonwealth Games =

- CGF code: BOT
- CGA: Botswana National Olympic Committee
- Website: bnoc.org.bw

in Kuala Lumpur, Malaysia
- Competitors: 24 in 5 sports
- Flag bearers: Opening: Closing:
- Medals Ranked —th: Gold 0 Silver 0 Bronze 0 Total 0

Commonwealth Games appearances (overview)
- 1974; 1978; 1982; 1986; 1990; 1994; 1998; 2002; 2006; 2010; 2014; 2018; 2022; 2026; 2030

Botswana competed at the 1998 Commonwealth Games, sending 24 athletes in five sports, including their first participation in squash.

== Results by event ==
=== Athletics ===
- Lulu Basinyi
- Justice Dipeba
- Glody Dube
- Kabo Gabaseme
- Gable Garenamotse
- Johnson Kubisa
- Dithapelo Molefi
- Tsoseletso Nkala

=== Badminton ===
- Emmanuel Kebairejang
- Mmoloki Mothala
- Harold Ndaba
- Kabelo Ofentse
- Tebogo Ofentse

=== Bowls ===
- Flora Anderson
- Clifton Richardson

=== Boxing ===
Men's Flyweight (– 51 kg)

- Elliot Mmila

Men's Featherweight (– 57 kg)

- Gilbert Khunwane

Men's Lightweight (– 60 kg)

- Bikkie Malaolo

Men's Welterweight (– 67 kg)

- Thebe Setlalekgosi

=== Squash ===
- Cunning Machinya
- Meleko Mokgosi
- Conrad Ntshebe
- Lefika Ragontse
- Pula Tangane

== See also ==
- Botswana at the 1996 Summer Olympics
- Botswana at the 2000 Summer Olympics
