= Botswana at the 1994 Commonwealth Games =

- CGF code: BOT
- CGA: Botswana National Olympic Committee
- Website: bnoc.org.bw

in Victoria, British Columbia, Canada
- Competitors: 33 in 4 sports
- Flag bearers: Opening: Closing:
- Medals Ranked T27th: Gold 0 Silver 0 Bronze 1 Total 1

Commonwealth Games appearances (overview)
- 1974; 1978; 1982; 1986; 1990; 1994; 1998; 2002; 2006; 2010; 2014; 2018; 2022; 2026; 2030

Botswana competed at the 1994 Commonwealth Games in Victoria, British Columbia, sending thirty-three athletes in four sports, including their first participation in badminton and boxing.

== Medals ==
=== Gold ===
- none

=== Silver ===
- none

=== Bronze ===
- France Mabiletsa — Boxing, Men's Light Heavyweight (– 81 kg)

== Results by event ==
=== Athletics ===
- Justice Dipeba
- Zacharia Ditetso
- Kabo Gabaseme
- Jwagamang Karesaza
- Kenneth Moima
- Moatshe Molebatsi
- Dithapelo Molefi
- Tsoseletso Nkala (née Sekweng)
- Mothusi Tsiana

=== Badminton ===
- Javed Aslam
- Bernard Gondo
- Herbert Kgaswane
- Tebogo Modisane
- Tjiyapo Mokobi
- Mohammed Rana
- Jennifer Seitshiro
- Tlamelo Sono

=== Bowls ===
- Flora Anderson
- Shirley Baylis
- Allen Bergg
- Arthur Hicks
- Raymond Mascarenhas
- Timothy Morton
- Jacqueline Rhodes
- Clifton Richardson

=== Boxing ===
Men's Light Flyweight (– 48 kg)

- Healer Modiradilo
  - Bye
  - Lost to Victor Kasote (ZAM), RSCH-2

Men's Lightweight (– 60 kg)

- O. Medupi

Men's Featherweight (– 57 kg)

- Victor Kgabung

Men's Light Welterweight (– 63.5 kg)

- Johannes Ditlhabang

Men's Welterweight (– 67 kg)

- Thuso Khubamang

Men's Light Middleweight (– 71 kg)

- Baboloki Mogotsi
  - Lost to Kurt Sinette (TRI), 8:11

Men's Middleweight (– 75 kg)

- David Nyathi
  - Defeated Sam Leuji (NZL), KO-1
  - Lost to Rasmus Ojemaye (NGA), 4:9

Men's Light Heavyweight (– 81 kg)

- France Mabiletsa
  - Defeated Paul Mwasele (TAN), 16:5
  - Defeated Stephen Kirk (NIR), 15:6
  - Lost to John Wilson (SCO), 8:13

== See also ==
- Botswana at the 1992 Summer Olympics
- Botswana at the 1996 Summer Olympics
