= Botswana at the 1996 Summer Olympics =

- IOC code: BOT
- NOC: Botswana National Olympic Committee

in Atlanta
- Competitors: 7 in 2 sports
- Flag bearer: Justice Dipeba
- Medals: Gold 0 Silver 0 Bronze 0 Total 0

Summer Olympics appearances (overview)
- 1980; 1984; 1988; 1992; 1996; 2000; 2004; 2008; 2012; 2016; 2020; 2024

Botswana competed at the 1996 Summer Olympics in Atlanta, United States.

== Competitors ==
The following is the list of number of competitors in the Games.

Sport	Men	Women	Total
Athletics	6	0	6
Boxing	1	–	1
Total	7	0	7

== Results by event ==
=== Athletics ===
==== Men ====
Track and road events

Athletes	Events	Heat Round 1		Heat Round 2		Semifinal		Final	
Athletes	Events	Time	Rank	Time	Rank	Time	Rank	Time	Rank
Justice Dipeba	200 metres	21.09	56	Did not advance					
Benjamin Keleketu	Marathon	N/A						Did not finish	
Agrippa Matshameko; Keteng Baloseng; Rampa Mosveu; Johnson Kubisa	4 x 400 metres relay	3:06.62	21	N/A		Did not advance			

=== Boxing ===
Athlete	Event	Round of 32	Round of 16	Quarterfinal	Semifinal	Final
Athlete	Event	Opposition Result	Opposition Result	Opposition Result	Opposition Result	Opposition Result
Healer Modiradilo	Light-Flyweight	Guardado (USA); L 11-9	Did not advance			

== See also ==
- Botswana at the 1994 Commonwealth Games
- Botswana at the 1998 Commonwealth Games
