= Botswana at the 1980 Summer Olympics =

- IOC code: BOT
- NOC: Botswana National Olympic Committee

in Moscow
- Competitors: 7 (7 men and 0 women) in 1 sport
- Medals: Gold 0 Silver 0 Bronze 0 Total 0

Summer Olympics appearances (overview)
- 1980; 1984; 1988; 1992; 1996; 2000; 2004; 2008; 2012; 2016; 2020; 2024

Botswana competed in the Olympic Games for the first time at the 1980 Summer Olympics in Moscow, USSR.

== Results by event ==
=== Athletics ===
Men's 100 metres

- Lucien Josiah
  - Heat — 11.15 (→ did not advance)

Men's 200 metres

- Lucien Josiah
  - Heat — 22.45 (→ did not advance)

Men's 400 metres

- Joseph Ramotshabe

Men's 800 metres

- Langa Mudongo
  - Heat — 1:52.5 (→ did not advance)

Men's 1,500 metres

- Ishmael Mhaladi
  - Heat — 3:59.1 (→ did not advance)

Men's 5,000 metres

- Robert Chideka

Men's 10,000 metres

- Golekane Mosweu
  - Heat — 30:38.8 (→ did not advance)

Men's 400 m Hurdles

- Wilfred Kareng
  - Heat — did not finish (→ did not advance)

== See also ==
- Botswana at the 1982 Commonwealth Games
