= Athletics at the 1984 Summer Olympics – Men's marathon =

Men's marathon at the Games of the XXIII Olympiad
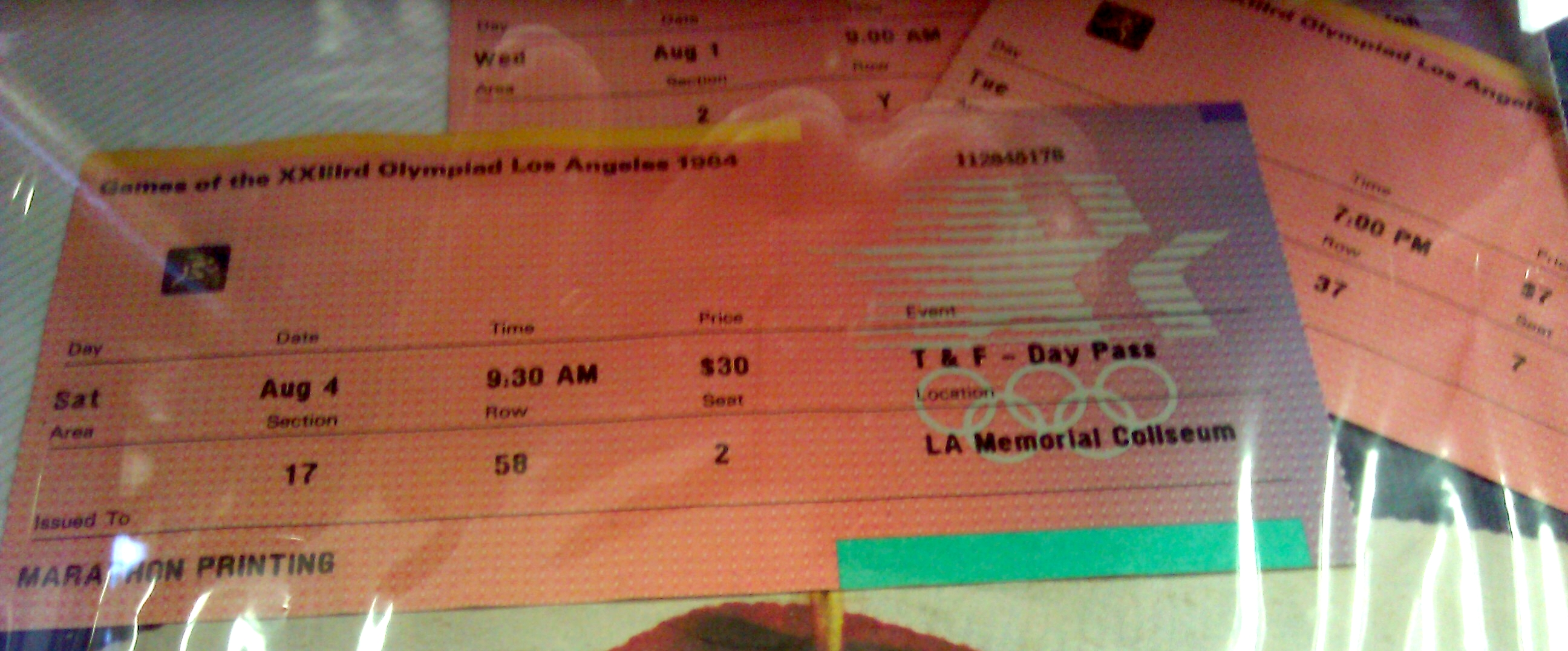
- Tickets for Athletics at the 1984 Summer Olympics
- Venue: Los Angeles Memorial Coliseum
- Date: August 12
- Competitors: 107 from 59 nations
- Winning time: 2:09:21 OR

Medalists
1st place, gold medalist(s)		Carlos Lopes; Portugal
2nd place, silver medalist(s)		John Treacy; Ireland
3rd place, bronze medalist(s)		Charlie Spedding; Great Britain

Official Video Highlights

The men's marathon at the 1984 Summer Olympics in Los Angeles, California, was held on Sunday August 12, 1984. The race started at 5:00 pm local time. There were 107 competitors from 59 countries. The maximum number of athletes per nation had been set at 3 since the 1930 Olympic Congress. A total number of 78 athletes completed the race.

The race was won by Carlos Lopes of Portugal, giving Portugal its first medal in the men's marathon, as well as its first ever gold medal at the Olympics. His time of 2:09:21 was the Olympic record for the next 24 years. Ireland also won its first men's marathon medal, with John Treacy's silver. Great Britain returned to the podium for the first time since 1964 with Charlie Spedding taking bronze.

== Background ==
This was the 20th appearance of the event, which is one of 12 athletics events to have been held at every Summer Olympics. Returning runners from the 1980 marathon included silver medalist Gerard Nijboer of the Netherlands, sixth-place finisher Rodolfo Gómez of Mexico, ninth-place finisher (and 1972 silver and 1976 bronze medalist) Karel Lismont of Belgium, and tenth-place finisher Robert de Castella of Australia. The two-time defending champion, Waldemar Cierpinski of East Germany, was prevented from trying for a third gold by the Eastern Bloc boycott.

The two favorites were de Castella (1981 Fukuoka winner, in world record time, and 1983 World Championships winner) and Toshihiko Seko of Japan (1981 Boston winner and 1978–1980 and 1983 Fukuoka winner). Alberto Salazar of the United States had a strong 1980 to 1982 (1980–1982 New York winner and 1982 Boston winner), but had less good results in 1983, and had finished second at the USA trials.

Botswana, the Central African Republic, Cyprus, Djibouti, Israel, Jamaica, Jordan, Oman, Qatar, the Virgin Islands, and Zaire each made their first appearance in Olympic men's marathons; the Republic of China made its first appearance as Chinese Taipei. The United States made its 19th appearance, most of any nation, having missed only the boycotted 1980 Games.

== Competition format and course ==
As all Olympic marathons, the competition was a single race. The marathon distance of 26 miles, 385 yards was run over a point-to-point route starting at Santa Monica College and ending at the Los Angeles Memorial Coliseum.

== Records ==
These were the standing world and Olympic records prior to the 1984 Summer Olympics.

World record	Robert de Castella (AUS)	2:08:18	Fukuoka, Japan	6 December 1981
Olympic record	Waldemar Cierpinski (GDR)	2:09:55.0	Montreal, Canada	31 July 1976

Carlos Lopes set a new Olympic record at 2:09:21.

== Schedule ==
All times are Pacific Daylight Time (UTC-7)

Date	Time	Round
Sunday, 12 August 1984	17:15	Final

== Results ==
Rank	Athlete	Nation	Time	Notes
1st place, gold medalist(s)	Carlos Lopes	Portugal	2:09:21	OR
2nd place, silver medalist(s)	John Treacy	Ireland	2:09:56	
3rd place, bronze medalist(s)	Charlie Spedding	Great Britain	2:09:58	
4	Takeshi So	Japan	2:10:55	
5	Robert de Castella	Australia	2:11:09	
6	Juma Ikangaa	Tanzania	2:11:10	
7	Joseph Nzau	Kenya	2:11:28	
8	Djama Robleh	Djibouti	2:11:39	
9	Jerry Kiernan	Ireland	2:12:20	
10	Rod Dixon	New Zealand	2:12:57	
11	Pete Pfitzinger	United States	2:13:53	
12	Hugh Jones	Great Britain	2:13:57	
13	Jorge González	Puerto Rico	2:14:00	
14	Toshihiko Seko	Japan	2:14:13	
15	Alberto Salazar	United States	2:14:19	
16	Mehmet Terzi	Turkey	2:14:20	
17	Shigeru So	Japan	2:14:38	
18	Ralf Salzmann	West Germany	2:15:29	
19	Henrik Jørgensen	Denmark	2:15:55	
20	Hussein Ahmed Salah	Djibouti	2:15:59	
21	Agapius Masong	Tanzania	2:16:25	
22	Gidamis Shahanga	Tanzania	2:16:27	
23	Eloi Schleder	Brazil	2:16:35	
24	Karel Lismont	Belgium	2:17:07	
25	Allan Zachariasen	Denmark	2:17:10	
26	Michail Koussis	Greece	2:17:38	
27	Pertti Tiainen	Finland	2:17:43	
28	Alain Lazare	France	2:17:52	
29	Vincent Ruguga	Uganda	2:17:54	
30	Armand Parmentier	Belgium	2:18:10	
31	César Mercado	Puerto Rico	2:19:09	
32	Omar Abdillahi Charmarke	Djibouti	2:19:11	
33	Øyvind Dahl	Norway	2:19:28	
34	Derek Froude	New Zealand	2:19:44	
35	Giovanni d'Aleo	Italy	2:20:12	
36	Jesús Herrera	Mexico	2:20:33	
37	Lee Hong-yeol	South Korea	2:20:56	
38	Juan Camacho	Bolivia	2:21:04	
39	Cor Vriend	Netherlands	2:21:08	
40	Frans Ntaole	Lesotho	2:21:09	
41	Johan Geirnaert	Belgium	2:21:35	
42	Jacques Boxberger	France	2:22:00	
43	Marco Marchei	Italy	2:22:38	
44	Art Boileau	Canada	2:22:43	
45	Samuel Hlawe	Swaziland	2:22:45	
46	Baikuntha Manandhar	Nepal	2:22:52	
47	Ahmed Mohamed Ismail	Somalia	2:23:27	
48	Chae Hong-nak	South Korea	2:23:33	
49	Joseph Otieno	Kenya	2:24:13	
50	Bruno Lafranchi	Switzerland	2:24:38	
51	Dick Hooper	Ireland	2:24:41	
52	Derick Adamson	Jamaica	2:25:02	
53	Claudio Cabán	Puerto Rico	2:27:16	
54	Marc Agosta	Luxembourg	2:27:41	
55	Wilson Theleso	Botswana	2:29:20	
56	Alejandro Silva	Chile	2:29:53	
57	Chen Chang-ming	Chinese Taipei	2:29:53	
58	Kim Won-sik	South Korea	2:30:57	
59	Rubén Aguiar	Argentina	2:31:18	
60	Sabag Shemtov	Israel	2:31:34	
61	Vincent Rakabaele	Lesotho	2:32:15	
62	Marios Kassianidis	Cyprus	2:32:51	
63	Arjun Pandit	Nepal	2:32:53	
64	Ismael Mahmoud Ghassab	Jordan	2:33:30	
65	Alain Bordeleau	Canada	2:34:27	
66	Tau John Tokwepota	Papua New Guinea	2:36:36	
67	Patric Nyambariro-Nhauro	Zimbabwe	2:37:18	
68	Kimurgor Ngeny	Kenya	2:37:19	
69	Amiri Yadav	Nepal	2:38:10	
70	Adolphe Ambowode	Central African Republic	2:41:26	
71	Carlos Ávila	Honduras	2:42:03	
72	Jules Randrianarivelo	Madagascar	2:43:05	
73	Abdul Lahij Ahmed	Somalia	2:44:39	The Los Angeles Times described Ahmed's Olympic finish as follows: "In one dramatic moment, Somalian runner Abdulahij Ahmed entered the stadium, obviously in pain. The stadium crowd rose to its feet, cheering wildly to encourage him to finish. He did."
74	George Mambosasa	Malawi	2:46:14	
75	Marlon Williams	Virgin Islands	2:46:50	
76	Johnson Mbangiwa	Botswana	2:48:12	
77	Leonardo Illut	Philippines	2:49:39	
78	Dieudonné LaMothe	Haiti	2:52:18	
—	Awadh Al-Sameer	Oman	DNF	
—	Ahmet Altun	Turkey	DNF	
—	Dave Edge	Canada	DNF	
—	Matthews Kambale	Malawi	DNF	
—	Ronald Lanzoni	Costa Rica	DNF	
—	Bigboy Matlapeng	Botswana	DNF	
—	Tommy Persson	Sweden	DNF	
—	Kjell-Erik Ståhl	Sweden	DNF	
—	Domingo Tibaduiza	Colombia	DNF	
—	Rodolfo Gómez	Mexico	DNF	
—	Gerard Nijboer	Netherlands	DNF	
—	Gerhard Hartmann	Austria	DNF	
—	Omar Aguilar	Chile	DNF	
—	Filippos Filippou	Cyprus	DNF	
—	Juan Carlos Traspaderne	Spain	DNF	
—	Santiago de la Parte	Spain	DNF	
—	Geoff Smith	Great Britain	DNF	
—	Nimley Twegbe	Liberia	DNF	
—	Miguel Angel Cruz	Mexico	DNF	
—	Cor Lambregts	Netherlands	DNF	
—	Stig Roar Husby	Norway	DNF	
—	Cidálio Caetano	Portugal	DNF	
—	Delfim Moreira	Portugal	DNF	
—	Ibrahim Al-Taher	Qatar	DNF	
—	Mehmet Yurdadön	Turkey	DNF	
—	Wilson Achia	Uganda	DNF	
—	John Tuttle	United States	DNF	
—	Masini Situ-Kumbanga	Zaire	DNF	
—	Tommy Lazarus	Zimbabwe	DNF	
—	Martti Vainio	Finland	DNS	

== See also ==
- 1982 Men's European Championships Marathon (Athens)
- 1983 Men's World Championships Marathon (Helsinki)
- 1984 Men's Friendship Games Marathon (Moscow)
- 1986 Men's European Championships Marathon (Stuttgart)
- 1987 Men's World Championships Marathon (Rome)
