= Ngeny =

Ngeny or Ng'eny is a Kenyan surname. Notable people with the name include:

- Elias Ngeny (born 1996), Kenyan middle-distance runner
- Kimurgor Ngeny (born 1951), Kenyan long-distance runner
- Kipng'eno Arap Ng'eny (1937–2014), Kenyan politician and telecommunications executive
- Noah Ngeny (born 1978), Kenyan middle-distance runner
