= Botswana at the 2020 Summer Olympics =

- IOC code: BOT
- NOC: Botswana National Olympic Committee

in Tokyo, Japan July 23, 2021 – August 8, 2021
- Competitors: 13 in 4 sports
- Flag bearers (opening): Amantle Montsho; Rajab Mahommed
- Flag bearer (closing): Anthony Pasela
- Medals Ranked 86th: Gold 0 Silver 0 Bronze 1 Total 1

Summer Olympics appearances (overview)
- 1980; 1984; 1988; 1992; 1996; 2000; 2004; 2008; 2012; 2016; 2020; 2024

Botswana competed at the 2020 Summer Olympics in Tokyo. Originally scheduled to take place from 24 July to 9 August 2020, the Games were postponed to 23 July to 8 August 2021, because of the COVID-19 pandemic. It was the nation's eleventh consecutive appearance at the Summer Olympics.

== Medalists ==
Medal	Name	Sport	Event	Date
Bronze	Isaac Makwala; Bayapo Ndori; Zibane Ngozi; Baboloki Thebe	Athletics	Men's 4 × 400 metres relay	August 7

== Competitors ==
The following is the list of number of competitors in the Games.

Sport	Men	Women	Total
Athletics	6	3	9
Boxing	1	1	2
Swimming	1	0	1
Weightlifting	0	1	1
Total	8	5	13

== Athletics ==
Botswana athletes achieved the entry standards, either by qualifying time or by world ranking, in the following track and field events (up to a maximum of 3 athletes in each event):

Key

- Note–Ranks given for track events are within the athlete's heat only
- Q = Qualified for the next round
- q = Qualified for the next round as a fastest loser or, in field events, by position without achieving the qualifying target
- NR = National record
- N/A = Round not applicable for the event
- Bye = Athlete not required to compete in round

Track & road events
Men

Athlete	Event	Heat		Semifinal		Final	
Athlete	Event	Result	Rank	Result	Rank	Result	Rank
Isaac Makwala	400 m	44.86	1 Q	44.59	3 q	44.94	7
Leungo Scotch	400 m	45.32	4 q	45.56	5	Did not advance	
Nijel Amos	800 m	1:45.04	1 Q	2:38.49	8 q	1:46.41	8
Isaac Makwala; Bayapo Ndori; Zibane Ngozi; Baboloki Thebe	4 × 400 m relay	2:58.33	2 Q	—		2:57.27	3rd place, bronze medalist(s)

Women

Athlete	Event	Heat		Semifinal		Final	
Athlete	Event	Result	Rank	Result	Rank	Result	Rank
Christine Botlogetswe	400 m	53.99 =SB	8	Did not advance			
Galefele Moroko	400 m	55.89 =SB	6	Did not advance			
Amantle Montsho	400 m	DNF		Did not advance			

== Boxing ==
Botswana entered two boxers into the Olympic tournament for the first time since London 2012. Keamogetse Kenosi scored an outright semifinal victory to secure a spot in the women's flyweight division at the 2020 African Qualification Tournament in Diamniadio, Senegal. Rajab Otukile Mahommed completed the nation's boxing lineup by topping the list of eligible boxers from Africa in the men's flyweight division of the IOC's Boxing Task Force Rankings.

Athlete	Event	Round of 32	Round of 16	Quarterfinals	Semifinals	Final	
Athlete	Event	Opposition Result	Opposition Result	Opposition Result	Opposition Result	Opposition Result	Rank
Rajab Mahommed	Men's flyweight	Martínez (COL); L 0–5	Did not advance				
Keamogetse Kenosi	Women's featherweight	Artingstall (GBR); L 0–5	Did not advance				

== Swimming ==
Botswana received a universality invitation from FINA to send a top-ranked male swimmer in his respective individual events to the Olympics, based on the FINA Points System of June 28, 2021.

Athlete	Event	Heat		Semifinal		Final	
Athlete	Event	Time	Rank	Time	Rank	Time	Rank
James Freeman	Men's 200 m freestyle	1:52.87	38	Did not advance			
James Freeman	Men's 400 m freestyle	4:03.10	35	—		Did not advance	

== Weightlifting ==
Botswana entered one female weightlifter for the first time into the Olympic competition. Magdeline Moyengwa topped the list of weightlifters from Africa in the women's 59 kg category based on the IWF Absolute Continental Rankings.

Athlete	Event	Snatch		Clean & jerk		Total	Rank
Athlete	Event	Result	Rank	Result	Rank	Total	Rank
Magdeline Moyengwa	Women's –59 kg	70	13	~~80~~	DNF	70	DNF
