= Botswana at the 2026 Commonwealth Games =

- Flag of Botswana
- CG code: BOT
- CGA: Commonwealth Games Association of Botswana
- Website: botswananoc.org

in Glasgow, Scotland 23 July 2026 – 2 August 2026
- Competitors: 25 in 5 sports
- Flag bearer: Maxine Egner
- Baton bearer: Lee Eppie
- Medals: Gold 0 Silver 0 Bronze 0 Total 0

Commonwealth Games appearances (overview)
- 1974; 1978; 1982; 1986; 1990; 1994; 1998; 2002; 2006; 2010; 2014; 2018; 2022; 2026; 2030

Botswana competed at the 2026 Commonwealth Games in Glasgow, Scotland. This marked Botswana's 13th participation at the games, after making its debut at the 1974 Commonwealth Games.

The Botswanan team consisted of 25 athletes competing in five sports. The Commonwealth Games Association of Botswana sent a goal of seven medals.

Swimmer Maxine Egner was the country's flagbearer during the opening ceremony. Meanwhile, sprinter Lee Eppie was the baton bearer during the opening ceremony.

The Botswanan team won zero medals. This marked the first time the country failed to medal since 1998.

== Competitors ==
The following is the list of number of competitors participating at the Games per sport/discipline.

Sport	Men	Women	Total
Athletics	6	6	12
Bowls	2	3	5
Boxing	2	1	3
Judo	1	2	3
Swimming	1	1	2
Total	12	13	25

== Athletics ==
The following 12-member team was announced for the 2026 Games in Glasgow on 26 June 2026. Botswana's top athletes Letsile Tebogo, Collen Kebinatshipi, and Bayapo Ndori were excused from competing due to a busy season.

Key

Ranks given for track events are within the athlete's heat only.

- Q = Qualified for the next round
- q = Qualified for the next round as a fastest loser or, in field events, by position without achieving the qualifying target

Men

Athlete	Event	Heat		Semifinal		Final	
Athlete	Event	Result	Rank	Result	Rank	Result	Rank
Phaezel Selepe	200 metres	bye		20.31	3 q	20.54	8
Justice Oratile	200 metres	20.58	1 Q	20.47	3	Did not advance	
Lee Eppie	400 metres	bye		45.26	2 Q	45.31	4
Ketlhobogile Haingura	800 metres	1:45.97	3 Q	1:45.82	6	Did not advance	
Tshepiso Masalela	Mile	—		3:57.11	6 Q	3:58.	12
Kemorenna Tisang	400 metres hurdles	50.05	7	Did not advance			

Women

Athlete	Event	Heat		Semifinal		Final	
Athlete	Event	Result	Rank	Result	Rank	Result	Rank
Boitshepiso Kelapile	100 metres	11.89	4	Did not advance			
Naledi Monthe	400 metres	56.30	6	Did not advance			
Obakeng Kamberuka	400 metres	51.54	1 Q	52.10	2 Q	52.53	8
Kennekae Batisani	400 metres	54.60	5 q	55.25	7	Did not advance	
Oratile Nowe	800 metres	2:02.11	2 Q	2:00.60	3 q	2:01.29	4
Tshegofatso Bojosi	Long jump	—		5.92	18	Did not advance	

== Bowls ==
Botswana entered five bowlers (two men and three women).

Athlete	Event	Group Stage							Semifinal	Final / BM	
Athlete	Event	Opposition Score	Opposition Score	Opposition Score	Opposition Score	Opposition Score	Opposition Score	Rank	Opposition Score	Opposition Score	Rank
Kaizer Geche	Men's singles	Wentzel (NAM); L 0.5–1.5	Greenslade (GGY); W 2–0	Wilson (AUS); L 0–2	Greechan (JEY); L 1–1*	McGreal (IOM); L 0.5–1.5	Aperau (COK); L 0–2	7	Did not advance		
Diza Mphotho; Charles Diteko	Men's pairs	Namibia; L 0–2	England; L 0–2	India; L 1–1*	Cook Islands; W 1.5–0.5	Falkland Islands; L 0.5–1.5	—N/a	5	Did not advance		
Boikhutso Mooketsi	Women's singles	O'Neill (NIR); L 0–2	Merrien (GGY); L 0–2	Bruce (NZL); L 0–2	Tiong (SGP); L 1–1*	Papani (NIU); W 2–0	—N/a	5	Did not advance		
Mpopi Pelemo; Chinky Sinombe	Women's pairs	Fiji; L 0.5–1.5	New Zealand; L 0–2	Wales; L 0–2	Canada; L 0–2	Kenya; W 1*–1	—N/a	5	Did not advance		

== Boxing ==
Botswana entered three boxers (one man and two women).

Athlete	Event	Round of 32	Round of 16	Quarterfinals	Semifinals	Final	
Athlete	Event	Opposition Result	Opposition Result	Opposition Result	Opposition Result	Opposition Result	Rank
Treasure Moremi	Men's 60 kg	Gataua (NIU); W 5–0	Litabe (LES); W 3–2	Siwach (IND); L 0–5	Did not advance		
Lethabo Modukanele	Women's 51 kg	—N/a	Sakshi (IND); L 0–5	Did not advance			
Keatlaretse Modise	Women's 54 kg	Bye	Hall (NZL); L 0–5	Did not advance			

== Judo ==
Botswana selected three judoka for the Games.

Athlete	Event	Round of 32	Round of 16	Quarterfinals	Semifinals	Repechage	Final/BM	
Athlete	Event	Opposition Result	Opposition Result	Opposition Result	Opposition Result	Opposition Result	Opposition Result	Rank
Botho Babutsi	Women's 48 kg	—N/a		Quach (CAN); L 000-100	—N/a	Thomas (MRI); W 100-001	for bronze Shaw (SCO); L 000-100	=5
Tumiso Phuthego	Men's 60 kg	—N/a	Khamis (TAN); W 100-000	Katz (AUS); L 000-100	—N/a	Gangaya (MRI); W 010-000	for bronze Pedro Neto (AUS); L 000-100	=5

== Swimming ==
Botswana entered two swimmers, one per gender.

Athlete	Event	Heat		Semifinal		Final	
Athlete	Event	Time	Rank	Time	Rank	Time	Rank
Adrian Robinson	Men's 50 m breaststroke	27.87	12 Q	28.57	16	Did not advance	
Adrian Robinson	Men's 100 m breaststroke	1:01.65	12 Q	1:01.95	14	Did not advance	
Maxine Caitlin Egner	Women's 50 m freestyle	27.10	31	Did not advance			
Maxine Caitlin Egner	Women's 100 m freestyle	59.06	32	Did not advance			
