= Botswana at the 2022 Commonwealth Games =

- Flag of Botswana
- CG code: BOT
- CGA: Botswana National Olympic Committee
- Website: botswananoc.org

in Birmingham, England 28 July 2022 – 8 August 2022
- Competitors: 33 (16 men and 17 women) in 8 sports
- Flag bearers: Bayapo Ndori; Aratwa Kasemang
- Medals Ranked =33rd: Gold 0 Silver 1 Bronze 1 Total 2

Commonwealth Games appearances (overview)
- 1974; 1978; 1982; 1986; 1990; 1994; 1998; 2002; 2006; 2010; 2014; 2018; 2022; 2026; 2030

Botswana competed at the 2022 Commonwealth Games at Birmingham, England from 28 July to 8 August 2022. It was Botswana's 12th appearance at the Games.

A team of 36 athlete will represent Botswana, the largest ever team the country has sent to the Commonwealth Games. However, only 33 athletes competed.

Bayapo Ndori and Aratwa Kasemang were the country's flagbearers during the opening ceremony.

== Medalists ==
Medal	Name	Sport	Event	Date
Silver	Leungo Scotch; Zibane Ngozi; Anthony Pesela; Bayapo Ndori; Keitumetse Maitseo	Athletics	Men's 4 × 400 m relay	7 August
Bronze	Lethabo Modukanele	Boxing	Women's Minimumweight	6 August

== Competitors ==
The following is the list of number of competitors participating at the Games per sport/discipline.

Sport	Men	Women	Total
Athletics	8	6	14
Boxing	2	3	5
Cycling	2	0	2
Judo	1	1	2
Lawn bowls	0	4	4
Squash	0	2	2
Swimming	2	1	3
Weightlifting	1	0	1
Total	16	17	33

== Athletics ==
A squad of seventeen athletes was confirmed as of 1 July 2022.

Men
Track and road events

Athlete	Event	Heat		Semifinal		Final	
Athlete	Event	Result	Rank	Result	Rank	Result	Rank
Leungo Scotch	400 m	45.75	2 Q	46.33	3	Did not advance	
Anthony Pesela	400 m	46.55	2 Q	47.63	7	Did not advance	
Zibane Ngozi	400 m	46.34	1 Q	47.06	5	Did not advance	
Tshepiso Masalela	800 m	1:49.12	5	—N/a		Did not advance	
Boitumelo Masilo	800 m	1:47.30	2 Q	—N/a		1:49.35	8
Leungo Scotch; Zibane Ngozi; Anthony Pesela; Bayapo Ndori; Keitumetse Maitseo	4 × 400 m relay	3:05.11	1 Q	—N/a		3:01.85	2nd place, silver medalist(s)

Field events

Athlete	Event	Qualification		Final	
Athlete	Event	Distance	Rank	Distance	Rank
Thapelo Monaiwa	Long jump	7.65	11 q	7.37	12

Women
Track and road events

Athlete	Event	Heat		Semifinal		Final	
Athlete	Event	Result	Rank	Result	Rank	Result	Rank
Tsaone Sebele	100 m	11.52	3 Q	11.71	8	Did not advance	
Oarabile Tshosa	100 m	11.40	2 Q	11.53	6	Did not advance	
Christine Botlogetswe	400 m	54.60	6	Did not advance			
Lydia Jele	400 m	53.24	4 q	55.09	8	Did not advance	
Lydia Jele; Thomphang Basele; Motlatsi Rante; Christine Botlogetswe	4 × 400 m relay	—N/a		—N/a		3:41.14	7

== Boxing ==
A squad of five boxers was confirmed as of 1 July 2022.

Athlete	Event	Round of 32	Round of 16	Quarterfinals	Semifinals	Final	
Athlete	Event	Opposition Result	Opposition Result	Opposition Result	Opposition Result	Opposition Result	Rank
Rajab Mahommed	Men's Flyweight	—N/a	Ariffin (MAS); W 5 - 0	Macdonald (ENG); L 0 - 5	Did not advance		
George Molwantwa	Men's Featherweight	Kyobe (UGA); W 4 - 1	Mukuka (NZL); L 2 - 3	Did not advance			
Lethabo Modukanele	Women's Minimumweight	—N/a		Pushpakumari (SRI); W 4 - 0	Resztan (ENG); L 0 - 5	Did not advance	3rd place, bronze medalist(s)
Keamogetse Kenosi	Women's Featherweight	—N/a	Maya (MAW); W 5 - 0	Walsh (NIR); L 0 - 5	Did not advance		
Aratwa Kasemang	Women's Lightweight	—N/a	Bye	Ogunsemilore (NGR); L RSC	Did not advance		

== Cycling ==
A squad of two cyclists was confirmed as of 1 July 2022.

=== Road ===
Men

Athlete	Event	Time	Rank
Matlhogonolo Botlhole	Road race	DNF	
Gontse Molefhe	Road race	DNF	
Matlhogonolo Botlhole	Time trial	59:43.20	42

=== Mountain Biking ===
Athlete	Event	Time	Rank
Gontse Molefhe	Men’s cross-country	LAP	

== Judo ==
A squad of two judoka was confirmed as of 1 July 2022.

Athlete	Event	Round of 16	Quarterfinals	Semifinals	Repechage	Final/BM	
Athlete	Event	Opposition Result	Opposition Result	Opposition Result	Opposition Result	Opposition Result	Rank
Tirelo Lekoko	Men's -73 kg	Repiyallage (SRI); L 00 - 10	Did not advance				9
Lauryn Pulamoeng	Women's +78 kg	Kana (KEN); L 00 - 01	Did not advance				9

== Lawn bowls ==
A squad of four bowlers was confirmed as of 1 July 2022.

Women

Athlete	Event	Group stage				Quarterfinal	Semifinal	Final / BM	
Athlete	Event	Opposition Score	Opposition Score	Opposition Score	Rank	Opposition Score	Opposition Score	Opposition Score	Rank
Marea Modutlwa; Tshenolo Moshokgo; Lesego Motladiile	Triples	Scotland; L 5-25	Wales; D 16-16	Cook Islands; L 13-15	4	Did not advance			
Marea Modutlwa; Tshenolo Moshokgo; Boikhutso Mooketsi; Lesego Motladiile	Fours	Australia; D 15-15	Scotland; W 21-11	Fiji; L 16-17	2 Q	New Zealand; L 13-17	Did not advance		

== Squash ==
A squad of two players was confirmed as of 1 July 2022.

Athlete	Event	Round of 64	Round of 32	Round of 16	Quarterfinals	Semifinals	Final	
Athlete	Event	Opposition Score	Opposition Score	Opposition Score	Opposition Score	Opposition Score	Opposition Score	Rank
Leungo Katse	Women's singles	Chisenga (ZAM); W 3 - 0	King (NZL); L 0 - 3	Did not advance				
Naomi Phatsima	Women's singles	Haywood (BAR); L 0 - 3	Did not advance					
Leungo Katse; Naomi Phatsima	Women's doubles	—N/a	West / Pitcairn (CAY); L 0 - 2	Did not advance				

== Swimming ==
A squad of three swimmers was confirmed as of 1 July 2022.

Men

Athlete	Event	Heat		Semifinal		Final	
Athlete	Event	Time	Rank	Time	Rank	Time	Rank
Adrian Robinson	50 m freestyle	24.57	41	Did not advance			
Adrian Robinson	50 m breaststroke	28.96	23	Did not advance			
Adrian Robinson	100 m breaststroke	1:03.13	17	Did not advance			
James Freeman	100 m freestyle	51.37	25	Did not advance			
James Freeman	200 m freestyle	1:50.62	21	—N/a		Did not advance	
James Freeman	400 m freestyle	3:57.56	15	—N/a		Did not advance	
James Freeman	1500 m freestyle	Did not start		—N/a		Did not advance	

Women

Athlete	Event	Heat		Semifinal		Final	
Athlete	Event	Time	Rank	Time	Rank	Time	Rank
Maxine Egner	50 m freestyle	27.24	28	Did not advance			
Maxine Egner	100 m freestyle	58.46	26	Did not advance			

== Weightlifting ==
One weightlifter qualified through his position in the IWF Commonwealth Ranking List (as of 9 March 2022).

Athlete	Event	Weight lifted		Total	Rank
Athlete	Event	Snatch	Clean & jerk	Total	Rank
Kgotla Kgaswane	Men's 55 kg	70 kg	101 kg	171 kg	9
