= Arjun Pandit =

Arjun Pandit may refer to:

== People ==
- Arjun Pandit (athlete), Nepalese marathon runner
- Arjun Panditrao Khotkar (born 1962), Indian politician

== Other ==
- Arjun Pandit, Bengali-language novel by Balai Chand Mukhopadhyay, adapted into the Indian films:
  - Arjun Pandit (1976 film)
  - Arjun Pandit (1999 film)
