= Botswana at the 2012 Summer Olympics =

- IOC code: BOT
- NOC: Botswana National Olympic Committee

in London
- Competitors: 4 in 2 sports
- Flag bearers: Amantle Montsho (opening); Oteng Oteng (closing)
- Medals Ranked 69th: Gold 0 Silver 1 Bronze 0 Total 1

Summer Olympics appearances (overview)
- 1980; 1984; 1988; 1992; 1996; 2000; 2004; 2008; 2012; 2016; 2020; 2024

Botswana competed at the 2012 Summer Olympics in London, United Kingdom, from 27 July to 12 August 2012. This was the nation's ninth appearance at the Olympics.

Botswana National Olympic Committee sent the nation's smallest delegation in its Olympic history. Four athletes from Botswana were selected to the team, competing only in athletics and boxing. Track star and sole female athlete Amantle Montsho, reigning World champion who was considered a pre-Olympic favourite, became a strong contender to win Botswana's first Olympic medal; however, she missed out of the medal standings in the women's 400 metres, finishing only in fourth place. Montsho was also appointed by the committee to be Botswana's flag bearer at the opening ceremony.

Despite being the nation's smallest delegation, Botswana left London with its first ever Olympic medal, when track runner Nijel Amos finished second in the men's 800 metres.

== Medalists ==
Medal	Name	Sport	Event	Date
Silver	Nijel Amos	Athletics	Men's 800 metres	9 August

== Athletics ==
Three track and field athletes from Botswana participated at the London games after having achieved qualifying standards in their respective events (up to a maximum of 3 athletes in each event at the 'A' Standard, and 1 at the 'B' Standard). Track runner Isaac Makwala, competing in the men's 400 metres, did not advance into the semi-finals after finishing fourth in the heats. Amantle Montsho, Botswana's only female athlete and 2011 world champion, was favored to win Botswana's first ever medal in the women's 400 metres, but finished in a disappointing fourth place. Her results became arbitrary, whether her coach's failure to obtain a VISA to the Olympics might have been a contributing factor. 2012 world junior champion and another Olympic hopeful Nijel Amos, however, qualified successfully in the early rounds of the men's 800 metres, and ended the nation's medal drought by obtaining his silver in the final event.

Men

Athlete	Event	Heat		Semifinal		Final	
Athlete	Event	Result	Rank	Result	Rank	Result	Rank
Isaac Makwala	400 m	45.67	4	Did not advance			
Nijel Amos	800 m	1:45.90	1 Q	1:44.54	2 Q	1:41.73	2nd place, silver medalist(s)

Women

Athlete	Event	Heat		Semifinal		Final	
Athlete	Event	Result	Rank	Result	Rank	Result	Rank
Amantle Montsho	400 m	50.40	1 Q	50.15	1 Q	49.75	4

Key

- Note–Ranks given for track events are within the athlete's heat only
- Q = Qualified for the next round
- q = Qualified for the next round as a fastest loser or, in field events, by position without achieving the qualifying target
- NR = National record
- N/A = Round not applicable for the event
- Bye = Athlete not required to compete in round

== Boxing ==
Boxer Oteng Oteng qualified for the Olympic games after winning the 2012 African Boxing Olympic Qualification Tournament in the flyweight category. Before the games, he was also the 2011 African champion in the same category. Unfortunately, Oteng lost to Puerto Rico's Jeyvier Cintrón in the first round match with a controversial move. By deliberating the final results, both Oteng and his coach felt surprised with the outcome after two even rounds and the last round, thought to be dominated by Oteng, was awarded instead to his opponent Cintrón by just a two-point difference.

Men

Athlete	Event	Round of 32	Round of 16	Quarterfinals	Semifinals	Final	
Athlete	Event	Opposition Result	Opposition Result	Opposition Result	Opposition Result	Opposition Result	Rank
Oteng Oteng	Flyweight	Cintrón (PUR); L 12–14	Did not advance				
