= Cook Islands at the 2006 Commonwealth Games =

- Flag of the Cook Islands
- CGF code: COK
- CGA: Cook Islands Sports and National Olympic Committee
- Website: www.oceaniasport.com/cookis

in Melbourne, Australia
- Competitors: 32
- Flag bearers: Opening: Closing:
- Medals: Gold 0 Silver 0 Bronze 0 Total 0

Commonwealth Games appearances (overview)
- 1974; 1978; 1982; 1986; 1990; 1994; 1998; 2002; 2006; 2010; 2014; 2018; 2022; 2026; 2030

The Cook Islands is represented at the 2006 Commonwealth Games in Melbourne by a 32-member strong contingent comprising 32 sportspersons and no officials.

== Medals ==
| | (gold) | (silver) | (bronze) | Total |
|---|---|---|---|---|
| Cook Islands | 0 | 0 | 0 | 0 |

== Athletes ==
Athletes included Myra Moller, Sam Pera, Jr. and Sam Nunuku Pera.

The Rugby sevens side included Richard Piakura.
