= Boxing at the 2014 Commonwealth Games – Women's middleweight =

Boxing competitions

Boxing – Women's middleweight at the 2014 Commonwealth Games
- Venue: Scottish Exhibition and Conference Centre
- Dates: July 29 – August 2
- Competitors: 13 from 13 nations

Medalists
gold medal	Savannah Marshall	England
silver medal	Ariane Fortin	Canada
bronze medal	Lauren Price	Wales
bronze medal	Edith Ogoke	Nigeria

The Women's middleweight boxing competition at the 2014 Commonwealth Games in Glasgow, Scotland took place between July 29 and August 2 at the Scottish Exhibition and Conference Centre. For the first time ever women's boxing will be contested.

Like all Commonwealth boxing events, the competition was a straight single-elimination tournament. Both semifinal losers were awarded bronze medals, so no boxers competed again after their first loss. Bouts consisted of four rounds of two minutes each, with a one-minute break between rounds. Punches scored only if the front of the glove made full contact with the front of the head or torso of the opponent. Three judges scored each bout; the winner of the bout was the boxer who won the most rounds.

== Medalists ==
Gold	Savannah Marshall; England
Silver	Ariane Fortin; Canada
Bronze	Lauren Price; Wales
Bronze	Edith Ogoke; Nigeria

== Results ==
All times are British Summer Time (UTC+1)

Round of 16; Tuesday 29 July 2014; 19:30
Phathiswa Thingana (RSA)	0
Ariane Fortin (CAN)	3
Elizabeth Andiego (KEN)	0
Kaye Scott (AUS)	3
Theresa London (GUY)	0
Lauren Price (WAL)	3
Keabetsoe Mothibeli (LES)
Shiromali Weerarathna (SRI)	TKO
Pooja Rani (IND)	0
Savannah Marshall (ENG)	3

Quarter-finals; Wednesday 30 July 2014; 19:30
Magan Maka (NZL)	0
Ariane Fortin (CAN)	3
Kaye Scott (AUS)	0
Lauren Price (WAL)	3
Edith Ogoke (NGR)	3
Shiromali Weerarathna (SRI)	0
Savannah Marshall (ENG)	3
Pearl Morake (BOT)	0

Semi-finals; Friday 1 August 2014; 19:30
Ariane Fortin (CAN)	2
Lauren Price (WAL)	1
Edith Ogoke (NGR)	0
Savannah Marshall (ENG)	3

Final; Saturday 2 August 2014; 19:25
Ariane Fortin (CAN)	1
Savannah Marshall (ENG)	2
