= Botswana at the 2000 Summer Olympics =

- IOC code: BOT
- NOC: Botswana National Olympic Committee

in Sydney
- Competitors: 7 in 2 sports
- Flag bearer: Gilbert Khunwane
- Medals: Gold 0 Silver 0 Bronze 0 Total 0

Summer Olympics appearances (overview)
- 1980; 1984; 1988; 1992; 1996; 2000; 2004; 2008; 2012; 2016; 2020; 2024

Botswana competed at the 2000 Summer Olympics in Sydney, Australia.

== Competitors ==
The following is the list of number of competitors in the Games.

Sport	Men	Women	Total
Athletics	6	0	6
Boxing	1	–	1
Total	7	0	7

== Athletics ==
Key

- Note–Ranks given for track events are within the athlete's heat only
- Q = Qualified for the next round
- q = Qualified for the next round as a fastest loser or, in field events, by position without achieving the qualifying target
- NR = National record
- N/A = Round not applicable for the event
- Bye = Athlete not required to compete in round

Men
Track and road events

Athletes	Events	Heat Round 1		Heat Round 2		Semifinal		Final	
Athletes	Events	Time	Rank	Time	Rank	Time	Rank	Time	Rank
Johnson Kubisa	400 metres	46.97	57	Did not advance					
Glody Dube	800 metres	1:46.17	4 Q	—		1:44.70	7 q	1:46.24	7
Tiyapo Maso	Marathon	—						2:38:53	77
California Molefe; Lulu Basinyi; Johnson Kubisa; Glody Dube; Aggripa Matshameko	4 × 400 metres relay	3:04.19	8 q	—		3:05.28	13	Did not advance	

== Boxing ==
Men

Athlete	Event	Round of 32	Round of 16	Quarterfinals	Semifinals	Final	
Athlete	Event	Opposition Result	Opposition Result	Opposition Result	Opposition Result	Opposition Result	Rank
Gilbert Khunwane	Lightweight	Bejarano (MEX); L 5–17	Did not advance				

== See also ==
- Botswana at the 1998 Commonwealth Games
- Botswana at the 2002 Commonwealth Games
