= Botswana at the 2024 Summer Olympics =

- IOC code: BOT
- NOC: Botswana National Olympic Committee

in Paris, France 26 July 2024 – 11 August 2024
- Competitors: 12 (10 men and 2 women) in 2 sports
- Flag bearers (opening): Letsile Tebogo & Maxine Egner
- Flag bearers (closing): Letsile Tebogo & Oratile Nowe
- Officials: Oreeditse Marakakgoro (chef de mission)
- Medals Ranked 55th: Gold 1 Silver 1 Bronze 0 Total 2

Summer Olympics appearances (overview)
- 1980; 1984; 1988; 1992; 1996; 2000; 2004; 2008; 2012; 2016; 2020; 2024

Botswana competed at the 2024 Summer Olympics in Paris from 26 July to 11 August 2024. It was the nation's twelfth consecutive appearance at the Summer Olympics.

Botswana National Olympic Committee appointed Oreeditse Marakakgoro as the nation's chef de mission for Paris 2024.

Letsile Tebogo won Botswana's first ever Olympic gold medal after winning the men's 200 metres, also becoming the first African to win the title.

== Medalists ==
Medal	Name	Sport	Event	Date
Gold	Letsile Tebogo	Athletics	Men's 200 m	8 August
Silver	Busang Kebinatshipi; Bayapo Ndori; Anthony Pesela; Letsile Tebogo	Athletics	Men's 4 × 400 m relay	10 August

Medals by sport
Sport	1st place, gold medalist(s)	2nd place, silver medalist(s)	3rd place, bronze medalist(s)	Total
Athletics	1	1	0	2
Total	1	1	0	2

Medals by gender
Gender	1st place, gold medalist(s)	2nd place, silver medalist(s)	3rd place, bronze medalist(s)	Total
Male	1	1	0	2
Female	0	0	0	0
Mixed	0	0	0	0
Total	1	1	0	2

Medals by date
Date	1st place, gold medalist(s)	2nd place, silver medalist(s)	3rd place, bronze medalist(s)	Total
8 August	1	0	0	1
10 August	0	1	0	1
Total	1	1	0	2

== Competitors ==
The following is the list of number of competitors in the Games.

Sport	Men	Women	Total
Athletics	9	1	10
Swimming	1	1	2
Total	10	2	12

== Athletics ==
Botswana track and field athletes achieved the entry standards for Paris 2024, either by passing the direct qualifying mark (or time for track and road races) or by world ranking, in the following events (a maximum of 3 athletes each):

Key

- Note–Ranks given for track events are within the athlete's heat only
- Q = Qualified for the next round
- q = Qualified for the next round as a fastest loser or, in field events, by position without achieving the qualifying target
- NR = National record
- N/A = Round not applicable for the event
- Bye = Athlete not required to compete in round

Track & road events

Athlete	Event	Preliminary		Heat		Repechage		Semifinal		Final	
Athlete	Event	Time	Rank	Time	Rank	Time	Rank	Time	Rank	Time	Rank
Letsile Tebogo	Men's 100 m	Bye		10.01	2 Q	—N/a		9.91	2 Q	9.86 NR	6
Letsile Tebogo	Men's 200 m	—N/a		20.10	1 Q	Bye		19.96	1 Q	19.46 AR	1st place, gold medalist(s)
Busang Kebinatshipi	Men's 400 m	—N/a		44.45 PB	3 Q	Bye		44.43 PB	3	Did not advance	
Bayapo Ndori	Men's 400 m	—N/a		44.87	2 Q	Bye		44.43	4	Did not advance	
Leungo Scotch	Men's 400 m	—N/a		45.28	5	45.33	2 q	45.16	7	Did not advance	
Tshepiso Masalela	Men's 800 m	—N/a		1.45:58	3 Q	Bye		1:45.33	2 Q	1:42.82 PB	7
Kethobogile Haingura	Men's 800 m	—N/a		1:46.46	7	1:45.52	1 Q	1:44.95	7	Did not advance	
Tumo Nkape	Men's 800 m	—N/a		1.46:99	6	1:45.57	7	Did not advance			
Victor Ntweng	Men's 400 m hurdles	—N/a		49.59	5	48.88	3	Did not advance			
Busang Kebinatshipi; Bayapo Ndori; Anthony Pesela; Letsile Tebogo	Men's 4 × 400 m relay	—N/a		2:57.76 SB	1 Q	—N/a				2:54.53 NR	2nd place, silver medalist(s)
Oratile Nowe	Women's 800 m	—N/a		2:01.00	6	2:03.29	5	Did not advance			

== Swimming ==
Botswana sent two swimmers to compete at the 2024 Paris Olympics.

Athlete	Event	Heat		Semifinal		Final	
Athlete	Event	Time	Rank	Time	Rank	Time	Rank
Adrian Robinson	Men's 100 m breaststroke	1:02.79	27	Did not advance			
Maxine Egner	Women's 100 m freestyle	58.98	27	Did not advance			

Qualifiers for the latter rounds (Q) of all events were decided on a time only basis, therefore positions shown are overall results versus competitors in all heats.
