= Tommy Lazarus =

Zimbabwean long-distance runner

Personal information
- Nationality: Zimbabwean
- Born: 15 October 1962 (age 63)

Sport
- Sport: Long-distance running
- Event: Marathon

Tommy S. Lazarus (born 15 October 1962) is a Zimbabwean former long-distance runner. He competed in the marathon at the 1984 Summer Olympics.

Lazarus didn't finish the 1984 Olympic marathon. However, he ran his marathon personal best of 2:22:16 hours the same year.

Lazarus was an active competitor in the early 1980s, running against rivals Esau Magwaza, Tapfumaneyi "Tap Tap" Jonga, and Patrick Nhauro. In 2017, Lazarus said he believed his generation of athletes didn't have proper guidance and coaching. He said that being a professional athlete was difficult because race results alone didn't tell the full story, and injuries could sabotage a career.
