= Botswana at the 2016 Summer Olympics =

- IOC code: BOT
- NOC: Botswana National Olympic Committee

in Rio de Janeiro
- Competitors: 12 in 3 sports
- Flag bearer: Nijel Amos
- Medals: Gold 0 Silver 0 Bronze 0 Total 0

Summer Olympics appearances (overview)
- 1980; 1984; 1988; 1992; 1996; 2000; 2004; 2008; 2012; 2016; 2020; 2024

Botswana competed at the 2016 Summer Olympics in Rio de Janeiro, from 5 to 21 August 2016. This was the nation's tenth consecutive appearance at the Summer Olympics.

Botswana National Olympic Committee sent the nation's largest delegation to the Games. A total of 12 athletes, 9 men and 3 women, were selected to compete only in athletics, judo, and swimming. The nation's team was relatively larger by two-thirds of its size from London 2012, where Botswana registered only four athletes.

Among the Botswana athletes on the team were freestyle swimmer Naomi Ruele, and middle-distance runner Nijel Amos, who built a historic milestone as the nation's first ever Olympic medalist, earning a silver in the men's 800 metres. The most successful athlete from London 2012, Amos was selected to lead the team as Botswana's flag bearer into the opening ceremony.

Botswana, however, left Rio de Janeiro without a single medal, failing to reproduce it from the previous Games. The men's 4 × 400 m relay squad, led by top sprinter Isaac Makwala, came close to adding another medal for Botswana, but finished fifth in the final.

== Athletics ==
Botswana athletes have so far achieved qualifying standards in the following athletics events (up to a maximum of 3 athletes in each event):

Key

- Note–Ranks given for track events are within the athlete's heat only
- Q = Qualified for the next round
- q = Qualified for the next round as a fastest loser or, in field events, by position without achieving the qualifying target
- NR = National record
- N/A = Round not applicable for the event
- Bye = Athlete not required to compete in round

Track & road events
Men

Athlete	Event	Heat		Semifinal		Final	
Athlete	Event	Result	Rank	Result	Rank	Result	Rank
Isaac Makwala	400 m	45.91	3 Q	46.60	8	did not advance	
Karabo Sibanda	400 m	45.56	3 Q	44.47	3 q	44.25	5
Baboloki Thebe	400 m	45.41	3 Q	DNS		did not advance	
Nijel Amos	800 m	1:50.46	7	did not advance			
Boitumelo Masilo	800 m	1:48.48	6	did not advance			
Nijel Amos; Isaac Makwala; Leaname Maotoanong; Onkabetse Nkobolo; Karabo Sibanda; Baboloki Thebe	4 × 400 m relay	2:59.35 NR	3 Q	—		2:59.06 NR	5

Women

Athlete	Event	Heat		Semifinal		Final	
Athlete	Event	Result	Rank	Result	Rank	Result	Rank
Christine Botlogetswe	400 m	52.37	4	did not advance			
Lydia Jele	400 m	52.24	4	did not advance			

== Judo ==
Botswana received an invitation from the Tripartite Commission to send a judoka competing in the men's extra-lightweight category (60 kg) to the Olympics, signifying the nation's Olympic debut in the sport.

Athlete	Event	Round of 64	Round of 32	Round of 16	Quarterfinals	Semifinals	Repechage	Final / BM	
Athlete	Event	Opposition Result	Opposition Result	Opposition Result	Opposition Result	Opposition Result	Opposition Result	Opposition Result	Rank
Gavin Mogopa	Men's −60 kg	Bye	Petříkov (CZE); L 000–110	did not advance					

== Swimming ==
Botswana received a Universality invitation from FINA to send two swimmers (one male and one female) to the Olympics, signifying the nation's return to the sport for the second time in history (the first being done in 2008).

Athlete	Event	Heat		Semifinal		Final	
Athlete	Event	Time	Rank	Time	Rank	Time	Rank
David van der Colff	Men's 100 m backstroke	57.77	35	did not advance			
Naomi Ruele	Women's 50 m freestyle	26.23	47	did not advance			
