= Botswana at the Commonwealth Games =

- CG code: BOT
- CGA: Botswana National Olympic Committee
- Website: botswananoc.org
- Medals Ranked 28th: Gold 5 Silver 6 Bronze 8 Total 19

Commonwealth Games appearances (overview)
- 1974; 1978; 1982; 1986; 1990; 1994; 1998; 2002; 2006; 2010; 2014; 2018; 2022; 2026; 2030

Botswana has competed at twelve Commonwealth Games, with the first coming in 1974. They did not participate in the 1978 Commonwealth Games, but have attended all eleven since. Botswana have won twelve medals, with six of these coming in boxing. Their most successful Games were 2010 when they won four medals, including Botswana's first ever gold, won by Amantle Montsho.

== Medals ==
Games	Gold	Silver	Bronze	Total
1974 Christchurch	0	0	0	0
1978 Edmonton	did not attend			
1982 Brisbane	0	0	0	0
1986 Edinburgh	0	0	1	1
1990 Auckland	0	0	0	0
1994 Victoria	0	0	1	1
1998 Kuala Lumpur	0	0	0	0
2002 Manchester	0	2	1	3
2006 Melbourne	0	1	1	2
2010 Delhi	1	1	2	4
2014 Glasgow	1	0	0	1
2018 Gold Coast	3	1	1	5
2022 Birmingham	0	1	1	2
2026 Glasgow	0	0	0	0
Total	5	6	8	19
