= Marc Agosta =

Luxembourgish long-distance runner (born 1948)

Personal information
- Nationality: Luxembourgish
- Born: 7 May 1948 (age 78) Koerich, Luxembourg

Sport
- Sport: Long-distance running
- Event: Marathon

Marc Agosta (born 7 May 1948) is a Luxembourgish long-distance runner. He competed in the marathon at the 1984 Summer Olympics.
