= Frans Ntaole =

Lesotho long-distance runner

Personal information
- Nationality: Lesotho
- Born: 8 August 1950 (age 76)

Sport
- Sport: Long-distance running
- Event: Marathon

Frans Ntaole (born 8 August 1950) is a Lesotho long-distance runner. He competed in the marathon at the 1984 Summer Olympics.
