= Giovanni D'Aleo =

Italian long-distance runner (born 1959)

Personal information
- Nationality: Italian
- Born: 1 July 1959 (age 67) Palermo, Italy
- Height: 1.78 m (5 ft 10 in)
- Weight: 65 kg (143 lb)

Sport
- Country: Italy
- Sport: Athletics
- Event: Long distance running
- Club: Cus Palermo

Achievements and titles
- Personal best: Marathon: 2:15:07 (1984).
Medal record
Summer Universiade
Silver medal – second place	1983 Edmonton	Marathon

Giovanni D'Aleo (born 1 July 1959 in Palermo) is a retired male long-distance runner from Italy, who won silver medal in the marathon at the 1983 Summer Universiade.

== Biography ==
He competed for his native country at the 1984 Summer Olympics in Los Angeles, California, finishing in 35th place. D'Aleo set his personal best (2:15.07) in the men's marathon in 1984.

== Achievements ==
Year	Competition	Venue	Position	Event	Notes
1984	Olympic Games	Los Angeles, United States	35th	Marathon	2:20:12
