= Cook Islands at the 2018 Commonwealth Games =

- Flag of the Cook Islands
- CG code: COK
- CGA: Cook Islands Sports and National Olympic Committee
- Website: www.oceaniasport.com/cookis

in Gold Coast, Australia 4 April 2018 – 15 April 2018
- Competitors: 18 in 4 sports
- Flag bearer: Patricia Taea
- Medals Ranked 39th: Gold 0 Silver 0 Bronze 1 Total 1

Commonwealth Games appearances (overview)
- 1974; 1978; 1982; 1986; 1990; 1994; 1998; 2002; 2006; 2010; 2014; 2018; 2022; 2026; 2030

The Cook Islands competed at the 2018 Commonwealth Games in the Gold Coast, Australia from April 4 to April 15, 2018. The Cook Islands delegation consisted of 18 athletes (7 male and eleven female) that competed across four sports: athletics (track and field), lawn bowls, swimming and weightlifting. It was The Cook Islands's 11th appearance at the Commonwealth Games.

On February 27, 2018, track and field athlete Patricia Taea was named as the nation's flag bearer at the opening ceremony.

Taiki Paniani and Aidan Zittersteijn won the country's first ever Commonwealth Games medal, when they won bronze in the men's pairs lawn bowls event.

== Medalists ==
Medal	Name	Sport	Event	Date
Bronze	Taiki Paniani; Aidan Zittersteijn	Lawn bowls	Men's Pairs	April 9

== Competitors ==
The following is the list of number of competitors participating at the Games per sport/discipline.

Sport	Men	Women	Total
Athletics (track and field)	1	2	3
Lawn bowls	5	5	10
Swimming	2	1	3
Weightlifting	0	2	2
Total	8	10	18

== Athletics (track and field) ==
The Cook Islands entered three athletes (one male and two female).

Track & road events

Athlete	Event	Heat		Semifinal		Final	
Athlete	Event	Result	Rank	Result	Rank	Result	Rank
Alex Beddoes	Men's 800 m	1:51.64	7	—N/a		did not advance	
Patricia Taea	Women's 100 m	12.22	7	did not advance			
Patricia Taea	Women's 200 m	24.91	7	did not advance			

Field events

Athlete	Event	Qualification		Final	
Athlete	Event	Distance	Position	Distance	Position
Tereapii Tapoki	Women's Shot put	12.60	13	did not advance	
Tereapii Tapoki	Women's Discus throw	—N/a		46.01	10

== Lawn bowls ==
The Cook Islands entered ten lawn bowlers (five male and five female).

Men

Athlete	Event	Group Stage						Quarterfinal	Semifinal	Final / BM	
Athlete	Event	Opposition Score	Opposition Score	Opposition Score	Opposition Score	Opposition Score	Rank	Opposition Score	Opposition Score	Opposition Score	Rank
Taiki Paniani	Singles	Wilson (AUS); L 6 - 21	Jones (NFI); L 5 - 21	Breitenbach (RSA); L 19 - 21	Salmon (WAL); L 17 - 21	Aquilina (MLT); L 17 - 21	6	did not advance			
Taiki Paniani; Aidan Zittersteijn	Pairs	England; W 15 - 13	Botswana; W 15 - 14	New Zealand; L 12 - 26	Papua New Guinea; W 18 - 14	Fiji; W 22 - 17	2 Q	South Africa; W 15 - 14	Wales; L 14 - 21	Malta; W 17 - 11	3rd place, bronze medalist(s)
Lawrence Paniani; Munokokura Pita; Adoni W-Rairoa	Triples	Scotland; L 11 - 27	Malaysia; W 16 - 10	Norfolk Island; L 10 - 23	Northern Ireland; W 18 - 17	—N/a	3	did not advance			
Lawrence Paniani; Munokokura Pita; Adoni W-Rairoa; Aidan Zittersteijn	Fours	New Zealand; L 4 - 21	Papua New Guinea; D 14 - 14	Canada; L 12 - 21	Wales; L 4 - 14	—N/a	5	did not advance			

Women

Athlete	Event	Group Stage						Quarterfinal	Semifinal	Final / BM	
Athlete	Event	Opposition Score	Opposition Score	Opposition Score	Opposition Score	Opposition Score	Rank	Opposition Score	Opposition Score	Opposition Score	Rank
Nooroa Mataio	Singles	Anserson (NFI); L 9 - 21	Senna (BOT); W 21 - 18	Mckerihen (CAN); L 7 - 21	Wimp (PNG); L 7 - 21	Mbugua (KEN); W 19 - 18	5	did not advance			
Emily Jim; Nooroa Mataio	Pairs	Malaysia; L 6 - 33	Botswana; L 16 - 29	Scotland; L 10 - 36	Brunei; L 8 - 26	—N/a	5	did not advance			
Teokotai Jim; Tiare Jim; Jacquelin Purea	Triples	Malaysia; L 14 - 20	Scotland; L 10 - 28	Norfolk Island; W 25 - 11	—N/a		3	did not advance			
Emily Jim; Teokotai Jim; Tiare Jim; Jacqueline Purea	Fours	Malaysia; L 8 - 22	Papua New Guinea; L 11 - 15	Australia; L 9 - 15	Namibia; W 20 - 7	—N/a	4	did not advance			

== Swimming ==
The Cook Islands entered three swimmers (two male and one female).

Men

Athlete	Event	Heat		Semifinal		Final	
Athlete	Event	Time	Rank	Time	Rank	Time	Rank
Temaruata Strickland	50 m freestyle	25.96	53	did not advance			
Temaruata Strickland	100 m freestyle	57.33	51	did not advance			
Wesley Roberts	200 m freestyle	1:49.35	15	—N/a		did not advance	
Wesley Roberts	400 m freestyle	3:56.09	9	—N/a		did not advance	
Wesley Roberts	1500 m freestyle	—N/a				15:40.36	6

Women

Athlete	Event	Heat		Semifinal		Final	
Athlete	Event	Time	Rank	Time	Rank	Time	Rank
Kirsten Fisher-Marsters	50 m breaststroke	33.84	22	did not advance			
Kirsten Fisher-Marsters	100 m breaststroke	1:15.41	24	did not advance			

== Weightlifting ==
The Cook Islands entered two female weightlifters.

Athlete	Event	Snatch		Clean & Jerk		Total	Rank
Athlete	Event	Result	Rank	Result	Rank	Total	Rank
Philippa Woonton	Women's −75 kg	75	9	93	10	168	10
Luisa Peters	Women's +90 kg	100	6	125	4	225	5

== See also ==
- Cook Islands at the 2018 Summer Youth Olympics
