= Botswana at the 1986 Commonwealth Games =

- CG code: BOT
- CGA: Botswana National Olympic Committee
- Website: bnoc.org.bw

in Edinburgh, Scotland
- Competitors: 22 in 2 sports
- Medals: Gold 0 Silver 0 Bronze 1 Total 1

Commonwealth Games appearances (overview)
- 1974; 1978; 1982; 1986; 1990; 1994; 1998; 2002; 2006; 2010; 2014; 2018; 2022; 2026; 2030

Botswana competed at the 1986 Commonwealth Games. They sent twenty-two athletes in two sports, including their first woman in athletics. They also won their first medal.

== Medals ==
Medal	Name	Sport	Event
Bronze	Babs Anderson	Lawn bowls	Women's Singles

== Botswana at the 1986 Commonwealth Games ==
=== Athletics ===
Men
Track and road

Athlete	Event	Heat		Semifinal		Final	
Athlete	Event	Time	Rank	Time	Rank	Time	Rank
Sunday Maweni	100 metres	11.01	6	did not advance			
Sunday Maweni	200 metres	21.89	5 q	22.21	6	did not advance	
Zacharia Machangani	400 metres	49.75	6 q	50.09	8	did not advance	
Joseph Ramotshabi	800 metres	1:50.37	5 q	1:49.98	6	did not advance	
Mbiganyi Thee	1500 metres	—N/a		3:46.13	8	did not advance	
Zacharia Machangani; Sunday Maweni; Joseph Ramotshabi; Mbiganyi Thee	4 × 400 metres relay	—N/a				Disqualified	
Bigboy Matlapeng	Marathon	—N/a				2:24.05	14
Golekane Mosweu	Marathon	—N/a				2:33.23	17
Johnson Mbangiwa	Marathon	—N/a				2:36.13	18

Women
Track and road

Athlete	Event	Final	
Athlete	Event	Time	Rank
Vanessa Tilbury	Marathon	2:47.24	10

=== Lawn bowls ===
The lawn bowls were held at Balgreen.

Men

Athlete	Event	Round Robin												Rank
Athlete	Event	Score	Score	Score	Score	Score	Score	Score	Score	Score	Score	Score	Score	Rank
Mel David	Singles	Schuback (AUS); L 21 - 4	Hill (WAL); L 21 – 6	Corsie (SCO); L 21 – 7	Espie (NIR); W 21 – 14	Dickison (CAN); L 21 – 16	Le Marquand (JER); L 21 – 20	Young (MAW); L 21 – 19	Bosley (HKG); L 21 – 13	Smith (GUE); W 21 – 14	Fong (FIJ); L 21 – 10	Thomson (ENG); L 21 – 19	Wallace (CAN); W 21 – 14	11
John Thackray; Ray Mascarenhas	Pairs	Australia; L 24 - 13	Wales; W 19 – 17	Scotland; L 28 – 14	England; L 20 – 15	Northern Ireland; L 18 – 16	New Zealand; L 25 – 14	Malawi; W 19 – 17	Canada; W 22 – 21	Fiji; L 25 – 11	Guernsey; L 30 – 15	Jersey; L 20 – 17	Hong Kong; Not played	12
Dennis Rose; Dereck Rhodes; James Benson; Johnie Kakakis	Fours	Australia; L 27 - 14	Swaziland; L 24 – 19	Scotland; L 26 – 18	Wales; L 25 – 17	Northern Ireland; W 21 – 15	New Zealand; W 23 – 16	Hong Kong; W 26 – 23	Guernsey; W 27 – 22	Fiji; W 28 – 15	Canada; L 17 – 15	England; L 31 – 13	—N/a	8

Women

Athlete	Event	Round Robin												Rank
Athlete	Event	Score	Score	Score	Score	Score	Score	Score	Score	Score	Score	Score	Score	Rank
Babs Anderson	Singles	Fahey (AUS); W 21 - 4	Dainton (WAL); L 21 – 19	McCrone (SCO); L 21 – 7	Line (ENG); L 21 – 14	Bell (NIR); L 21 – 15	Ryan (NZL); W 21 – 18	Hunter (CAN); W 21 – 16	Blattman (JER)| W 21 – 4	Humphreys (HKG); W 21 – 14	le Tissier (GUE); W 21 – 10	Lum On (FIJ); W 21 – 12	—N/a	(bronze)
Eve Thomas; Margaret Green	Pairs	Australia; L 24 - 16	Wales; L 33 – 6	Scotland; W 18 – 17	Northern Ireland; L 38 – 14	New Zealand; L 36 – 8	Guernsey; D 19 – 19	Fiji; L 25 – 13	England; L 23 – 16	Canada; L 23 – 14	Hong Kong; W 20 – 18	—N/a		10
Denise David; Jacqueline Rhodes; Olwen Leadbitter; Yvonne Richards	Fours	Malawi; W 22 – 13	Wales; W 21 – 13	Hong Kong; L 25 – 14	Swaziland; L 18 – 15	England; L 22 – 10	Canada; W 23 – 10	Northern Ireland; L 22 – 18	Scotland; W 21 – 12	New Zealand; L 26 – 18	Australia; L 20 – 14	Guernsey; L	Fiji; L 19 – 13	10
