= Norfolk Island at the 2019 Pacific Games =

- Flag of Norfolk Island

in Apia, Samoa 8 July 2019 – 20 July 2019
- Competitors: 38 in 6 sports
- Medals Ranked 17th: Gold 2 Silver 2 Bronze 3 Total 7

Pacific Games appearances
- 1979; 1983; 1987; 1991; 1995; 1999; 2003; 2007; 2011; 2015; 2019; 2023

Norfolk Island competed at the 2019 Pacific Games in Apia, Samoa from 7 to 20 July 2019. The country participated in six sports at the 2019 games.

== Medalists ==
Medal	Name	Sport	Event	Date
Gold	Travey Wora; Tassie Evans; Ann Snell; Petal Jones	Lawn bowls	Women's fours	8—13 July
Gold	Shae Wilson; Petal Jones	Lawn bowls	Women's pairs	8—13 July
Silver	Shae Wilson	Lawn bowls	Women's singles	8—13 July
Silver	Garry Ryan; Garry Bigg; Stephen Matthews; Trev Gow	Lawn bowls	Men's fours	8—13 July
Bronze	Douglas Creek	Shooting	Pistol 25 m individual	15—19 July
Bronze	Kevin Coulter; Douglas Creek	Shooting	Pistol 25 m team	15—19 July
Bronze	Kevin Coulter; Douglas Creek	Shooting	Standard pistol 25 m team	15—19 July

== Archery ==
Two male archers were selected to compete for Norfolk Island at the 2019 tournament:

Men

- Steven Baker
- Robert Kemp

== Golf ==
Norfolk Island selected four male players for the 2019 tournament:

Men

- Thomas Greenwood
- Beau Magri
- Jared Magri
- Michael Sterling

== Lawn bowls ==
Norfolk Island selected five men and five women to compete in lawn bowls at the 2019 games:

Men

- Gary Bigg
- Trevor Gow
- Phillip Jones
- Stephen Matthews
- Garry Ryan

Women

- Tessie Evans
- Christine Jones
- Patricia Snell
- Shae Wilson
- Tracey Wora

== Netball ==
Summary

Team	Event	Group stage				Semifinal	Final / BM / Cl.	
Team	Event	Opposition Result	Opposition Result	Opposition Result	Rank	Opposition Result	Opposition Result	Rank
Norfolk Island	Women's tournament	Samoa; L 12-95	Cook Islands; L 16-91	Tokelau; L 17-64	4	Did not qualify	Did not qualify	7

A squad of twelve players was selected for the Norfolk Island netball team at the 2019 games:

Women

- Candice Nobbs
- Michelle Dowling
- Emily Ryves
- Alana Christian
- Lara Bigg
- Erin Christian
- Rianna Christian
- Mareeva Evans
- Tahlia Evans
- Bekki Meers
- Kylie Sterling
- Paige Adams

== Shooting ==
Norfolk Island selected six men to compete in shooting at the 2019 games:

Men

- Douglas Creek
- Kevin Coulter
- Andrew Barnett
- Michael Williams
- Dustin Menzies
- Brancker South

== Squash ==
Norfolk Island selected four men to compete in squash at the 2019 games:

Men

- Nathaniel Kalsrap
- Marc Kalsrap
- Aidan Rowston
- Eamonn Kennerley
