= Botswana at the 2010 Commonwealth Games =

- CGF code: BOT
- CGA: Botswana National Olympic Committee
- Website: bnoc.org.bw

in Delhi, India
- Competitors: 49
- Flag bearers: Opening:Amantle Montsho; Closing:
- Medals Ranked 22nd: Gold 1 Silver 1 Bronze 2 Total 4

Commonwealth Games appearances (overview)
- 1974; 1978; 1982; 1986; 1990; 1994; 1998; 2002; 2006; 2010; 2014; 2018; 2022; 2026; 2030

Botswana competed in the 2010 Commonwealth Games held in Delhi, India, from 3 to 14 October 2010.

== Medalists ==
Medal	Name	Sport	Event	Date
Gold	Amantle Montsho	Athletics	Women's 400m	October 8
Bronze	Kabelo Kgosiemang	Athletics	Men's High Jump	October 9
Silver	Tirafalo Seoko	Boxing	Bantamweight	October 9
Bronze	Oteng Oteng	Boxing	Flyweight	October 12

== See also ==
- 2010 Commonwealth Games
