= Botswana at the 1982 Commonwealth Games =

- CGF code: BOT
- CGA: Botswana National Olympic Committee
- Website: bnoc.org.bw

in Brisbane, Australia
- Medals: Gold 0 Silver 0 Bronze 0 Total 0

Commonwealth Games appearances (overview)
- 1974; 1978; 1982; 1986; 1990; 1994; 1998; 2002; 2006; 2010; 2014; 2018; 2022; 2026; 2030

Botswana competed in the 1982 Commonwealth Games. They sent athletes in two sports.

== Athletics ==
Men's 200 metres

- Pius Kgannyeng
- Shepherd Mogapi

Men's 400 metres

- Pius Kgannyeng
- Joseph Ramotshabi

Men's 800 metres

- Temba Mpofu
- Joseph Ramotshabi

Men's 4x400 metre relay

- Pius Kgannyeng
- Shepherd Mogapi
- Temba Mpofu
- Joseph Ramotshabi

Men's Marathon

- Wilson Theleso

== Lawn Bowls ==
Men's Doubles

Men's Fours

Men's Singles

Women's Triples

== Sources ==
- Official results by country
