= Chae Hong-nak =

South Korean runner (born 1961)

Chae Hong-nak 채홍낙
Personal information
- Nationality: South Korean
- Born: 29 May 1961 (age 65)

Sport
- Sport: Long-distance running
- Event: Marathon

Chae Hong-nak (Korean: 채홍낙, born 29 May 1961) is a South Korean long-distance runner. He competed in the marathon at the 1984 Summer Olympics.

== Career ==
In 1982, Chae – along with fellow Konkuk University alumni Jeong Man-hwa, finished a marathon in joint-first place – in a time of 2 hours, 21 minutes and 8 seconds.

On 18 March 1983, Chae was described as the "national representative" and was announced as holding the record of 2 hours, 21 minutes and 8 seconds.

In March 1983, in the 54th Dong-A Marathon, Chae, on a 195km full course, set a time of 2 hours, 16 minutes and 33 seconds - falling just 18 seconds short of the record set by Moon Heung-ju in 1974. He was described as "dreaming" of a "new record by 5 seconds" and overpaced the remaining 2,195 km. He set a goal of 16 minutes for every 5km, but was described as "making the mistake" of "sprinting too early at the 33km mark".

During the 1984 Olympics, Chae competed in the marathon, finishing 48th with a time of 2:23:33. That same year in November, he set a Korean record of 2 hours, 15 minutes and 16 seconds.

Chae was described as having "overflowing fighting spirit and strength" as his strengths, but was also described as having "a lack of speed".
