= Botswana at the 2018 Commonwealth Games =

- Flag of Botswana
- CG code: BOT
- CGA: National Olympic Committee of Botswana
- Website: bnoc.org.bw

in Gold Coast, Australia 4 April 2018 – 15 April 2018
- Competitors: 26 in 5 sports
- Medals Ranked 16th: Gold 3 Silver 1 Bronze 1 Total 5

Commonwealth Games appearances (overview)
- 1974; 1978; 1982; 1986; 1990; 1994; 1998; 2002; 2006; 2010; 2014; 2018; 2022; 2026; 2030

Botswana competed at the 2018 Commonwealth Games in the Gold Coast, Australia from April 4 to April 15, 2018. It was Botswana's 11th appearance at the Commonwealth Games.

The Botswana team consisted of 27 athletes (16 men and 11 women) that competed in five sports. However, Goitseone Seleka did not compete in any events. The goal for the team was to win eight medals.

== Medalists ==
Medal	Name	Sport	Event	Date
Gold	Isaac Makwala	Athletics	Men's 400 m	April 10
Gold	Amantle Montsho	Athletics	Women's 400 m	April 11
Gold	Isaac Makwala; Leaname Maotoanong; Onkabetse Nkobolo; Baboloki Thebe	Athletics	Men's 4 × 400 m Relay	April 14
Silver	Baboloki Thebe	Athletics	Men's 400 m	April 10
Bronze	Christine Botlogetswe; Loungo Matlhaku; Amantle Montsho; Galefele Moroko	Athletics	Women's 4 × 400 m Relay	April 14

== Competitors ==
The following is the list of number of competitors participating at the Games per sport/discipline.

Sport	Men	Women	Total
Athletics	9	4	13
Boxing	1	3	4
Lawn bowls	5	2	7
Swimming	0	1	1
Weightlifting	1	0	1
Total	16	10	26

== Athletics ==
Men
Track & road events

Athlete	Event	Heat		Semifinal		Final	
Athlete	Event	Result	Rank	Result	Rank	Result	Rank
Karabo Mothibi	100 m	10.42	4	did not advance			
Karabo Mothibi	200 m	DNS		did not advance			
Pako Seribe	200 m	DNF		did not advance			
Isaac Makwala	400 m	46.01	1 Q	45.00	1 Q	44.35	1st place, gold medalist(s)
Karabo Sibanda	400 m	46.15	2 Q	46.26	4	did not advance	
Baboloki Thebe	400 m	46.17	3 Q	45.54	2 Q	45.09	2nd place, silver medalist(s)
Nijel Amos	800 m	1:45.12	1 Q	—N/a		1:48.45	8
Isaac Makwala; Leaname Maotoanong; Onkabetse Nkobolo; Baboloki Thebe	4 × 400 m relay	3:05.01	1 Q	—N/a		3:01.78	1st place, gold medalist(s)

Field events

Athlete	Event	Qualification		Final	
Athlete	Event	Distance	Position	Distance	Position
Goabaone Mosheleketi	Triple jump	15.74	14	did not advance	

Women
Track & road events

Athlete	Event	Heat		Semifinal		Final	
Athlete	Event	Result	Rank	Result	Rank	Result	Rank
Loungo Matlhaku	200 m	24.05	5 q	23.98	7	did not advance	
Christine Botlogetswe	400 m	51.73	2 Q	51.41	2 Q	51.17	4
Amantle Montsho	400 m	51.20	1 Q	51.26	2 Q	50.15	1st place, gold medalist(s)
Galefele Moroko	400 m	53.28	2 Q	54.27	6	did not advance	
Christine Botlogetswe; Loungo Matlhaku; Amantle Montsho; Galefele Moroko	4 × 400 m relay	—N/a				3:26.86	3rd place, bronze medalist(s)

== Boxing ==
Botswana participated with a team of 4 athletes (1 man and 3 women)

Athlete	Event	Round of 16	Quarterfinals	Semifinals	Final	Rank
Athlete	Event	Opposition Result	Opposition Result	Opposition Result	Opposition Result	Rank
Rajab Mahommed	Men's −52 kg	BYE	Irvine (NIR); L 1 - 4	did not advance		
Lethabo Modukanele	Women's −48 kg	—N/a	Benny (NZL); L 0 - 5	did not advance		
Keamogetse Kenosi	Women's −57 kg	BYE	Walsh (NIR); L RSC	did not advance		
Aratwa Kasemang	Women's −60 kg	BYE	Garton (NZL); L 0 - 5	did not advance		

== Lawn bowls ==
Botswana will compete in Lawn bowls.

Men

Athlete	Event	Group Stage						Quarterfinal	Semifinal	Final / BM	
Athlete	Event	Opposition Score	Opposition Score	Opposition Score	Opposition Score	Opposition Score	Rank	Opposition Score	Opposition Score	Opposition Score	Rank
John Gaborutwe	Singles	de Sousa (JER); L 6-21	Bester (CAN); L 4-21	Kelly (NIR); L 13-21	Bazo (PNG); L 18-21	McGreal (IOM); L 13-21	6	did not advance			
Edwin Nyoka; Kiso Robert	Pairs	New Zealand; L 8–27	Cook Islands; L 14–15	Fiji; L 11-25	England; L 9-24	Papua New Guinea; L 11-21	6	did not advance			
John Gaborutwe; Kabo Gaboutloeloe; Nixon Senna	Triples	Brunei; W 17–16	Jersey; L 4–27	Australia; L 4-33	Fiji; L 12-19	—N/a	4	did not advance			
Kabo Gaboutloeloe; Edwin Nyoka; Kitso Robert; Nixon Senna	Fours	Australia; L 5-21	India; L 9-16	Norfolk Island; L 8-11	South Africa; L 6-22	—N/a	5	did not advance			

Women

Athlete	Event	Group Stage						Quarterfinal	Semifinal	Final / BM	
Athlete	Event	Opposition Score	Opposition Score	Opposition Score	Opposition Score	Opposition Score	Rank	Opposition Score	Opposition Score	Opposition Score	Rank
Nelly Senna	Singles	McKerihen (CAN); L 9–21	Mataio (COK); L 18–21	Mbugua (KEN); L 10-21	Anderson (NFI); L 17-21	Wimp (PNG); L 9-21	6	did not advance			
Lephai Modutlwa; Nelly Senna	Pairs	Scotland; L 9-25	Brunei; L 17-19	Cook Islands; W 29-16	Malaysia; L 7-29	—N/a	4	did not advance			

== Swimming ==
Botswana participated with 1 athlete (1 woman).

Women

Athlete	Event	Heat		Semifinal		Final	
Athlete	Event	Time	Rank	Time	Rank	Time	Rank
Naomi Ruele	50 m backstroke	29.18	12 Q	29.17	13	did not advance	
Naomi Ruele	100 m backstroke	1:02.58	13 Q	1:03.01	15	did not advance	

== Weightlifting ==
Botswana participated with one athlete (one man).

Athlete	Event	Snatch		Clean & Jerk		Total	Rank
Athlete	Event	Result	Rank	Result	Rank	Total	Rank
Kgotla Kgaswane	Men's −56 kg	68	10	86	11	154	11

== See also ==
- Botswana at the 2018 Summer Youth Olympics
