= Cook Islands at the 2010 Commonwealth Games =

- Flag of the Cook Islands
- CGF code: COK
- CGA: Cook Islands Sports and National Olympic Committee
- Website: www.oceaniasport.com/cookis

in Delhi, India
- Competitors: 31
- Flag bearers: Opening: Closing:
- Medals: Gold 0 Silver 0 Bronze 0 Total 0

Commonwealth Games appearances (overview)
- 1974; 1978; 1982; 1986; 1990; 1994; 1998; 2002; 2006; 2010; 2014; 2018; 2022; 2026; 2030

Cook Islands competed in the 2010 Commonwealth Games held in Delhi, India, from 3 to 14 October 2010.

Their team of 31 athletes was announced on 11 September 2010.

== Team Cook Islands at the 2010 Commonwealth Games ==
=== Athletics ===
Team Cook Islands consists of 2 athletes.

Patricia Taea, Tiraa Arere Jnr

=== Boxing ===
Team Cook Islands consists of 2 boxers.

Mathew Titoa, Jubilee Arama

=== Lawn Bowls ===
Team Cook Islands consists of 12 lawn bowls players.

Irene Tupuna, Mou Tokorangi, Nane Tere, Porea Elisa, Tai Jim, Kanny Vaile,
Denis Tokorangi, Tupou Okirua Tupou Farapotea, Kairua Takai, Vaine Henry, Vou Ina Tou, Peter Totoo

Men

Event	Player(s)	Rank
Men's Singles	TBA	-
Men's Pairs	TBA	-
Men's Triples	TBA	-

Women

Event	Player(s)	Rank
Women's Singles	TBA	-
Women's Pairs	TBA	-
Women's Triples	TBA	-

=== Netball ===
Team Cook Islands consists of 12 netball players.

Summary

Event	Team	Rank
Women's Team	Cook Islands	10

Women

Kelani Matapo, Eleanor Taputu-Crombie, Luciana Matenga, Melissa Pittman, Celeste Brunton, Holly Solomona,
Ritua Ali'iva'a, Paula Te Huna, Curly George, Patty Te Huna, Noeline Davida, Ngatokorua Ellis Tuitupou

Pool B

Pos	Team	Pld	W	D	L	GF	GA	G%	Pts
1	New Zealand	5	5	0	0	403	137	294.2	10
2	England	5	4	0	1	346	167	207.2	8
3	South Africa	5	3	0	2	257	253	101.6	6
4	Barbados	5	2	0	3	206	338	60.9	4
5	Cook Islands	5	1	0	4	203	359	56.5	2
6	Papua New Guinea	5	0	0	5	211	372	56.7	0

- Goal percentage (G%) = 100 × GF/GA. Accurate to one decimal place.
- Highlighted teams advanced to the medal playoffs; other teams contested classification matches.

5 October; 15:00 (IST)	Report	New Zealand	87 – 24	Cook Islands	Thyagaraj Sports Complex; Umpires: Anne Abraitis, Sylvester Campbell; Reserve umpire: Gary Burgess
5 October; 15:00 (IST)	Report	Van Dyk 37/39 (95%); Tutaia 30/34 (88%); Rasmussen 6/8 (75%); Wipiiti 14/21 (67%)		PK Te Huna 7/10 (70%); George 17/27 (63%)	Thyagaraj Sports Complex; Umpires: Anne Abraitis, Sylvester Campbell; Reserve umpire: Gary Burgess

6 October; 09:30 (IST)	Report	Cook Islands	46 – 60	Barbados	Thyagaraj Sports Complex; Umpires: Annie Kloppers, Anne Abraitis; Reserve umpire: Sylvester Campbell
6 October; 09:30 (IST)	Report	George 21/28 (75%); PK Te Huna 20/26 (77%); Tuitupou 5/6 (83%)		Bishop 48/49 (98%); Piggott 12/18 (67%)	Thyagaraj Sports Complex; Umpires: Annie Kloppers, Anne Abraitis; Reserve umpire: Sylvester Campbell

8 October; 17:00 (IST)	Report	England	81 – 33	Cook Islands	Thyagaraj Sports Complex; Umpires: Joel Young Strong, Sylvester Campbell; Reserve umpire: Amanda Nottingham
8 October; 17:00 (IST)	Report	Brownfield 35/39 (90%); Cookey 25/27 (93%); Dunn 21/27 (78%)		George 17/27 (63%); PK Te Huna 16/24 (67%)	Thyagaraj Sports Complex; Umpires: Joel Young Strong, Sylvester Campbell; Reserve umpire: Amanda Nottingham

9 October; 15:00 (IST)	Report	Cook Islands	60 – 58	Papua New Guinea	Thyagaraj Sports Complex; Umpires: Dalton Hinds, Paula Ferguson; Reserve umpire: Joel Young Strong
9 October; 15:00 (IST)	Report	PK Te Huna 23/26 (88%); Tuitupou 37/45 (82%)		Baldwin 7/9 (78%); Rikis 43/48 (90%); Roberts 8/8 (100%)	Thyagaraj Sports Complex; Umpires: Dalton Hinds, Paula Ferguson; Reserve umpire: Joel Young Strong

10 October; 19:00 (IST)	Report	South Africa	73 – 40	Cook Islands	Thyagaraj Sports Complex; Umpires: Judith Groves, Dalton Hinds; Reserve umpire: Sharon Kelly
10 October; 19:00 (IST)	Report	Bootha 16/23 (70%); Gumede 53/64 (83%); Holtzhausen 4/6 (67%)		George 4/5 (80%); PK Te Huna 15/20 (75%); Tuitupou 21/28 (75%)	Thyagaraj Sports Complex; Umpires: Judith Groves, Dalton Hinds; Reserve umpire: Sharon Kelly

11 October; 15:00 (IST)	Report	Cook Islands	43 – 68	Samoa	Thyagaraj Sports Complex; Umpires: Dalton Hinds, Bobbi Brown; Reserve umpire: Sylvester Campbell
11 October; 15:00 (IST)	Report	Davida 5/7 (71%); George 8/10 (80%); PK Te Huna 17/22 (77%); Tuitupou 13/16 (81%)		Chang 8/10 (80%); Faasavalu 3/5 (60%); Fuimaono 15/19 (79%); Langi 42/49 (86%)	Thyagaraj Sports Complex; Umpires: Dalton Hinds, Bobbi Brown; Reserve umpire: Sylvester Campbell

=== Tennis ===
Team Cook Islands consists of 1 player.

Brittany Teei

=== Weightlifting ===
Team Cook Islands consists of 2 weightlifters.

Luisa Peters, Sirla Pera

== See also ==
- 2010 Commonwealth Games
