= Botswana at the 1974 British Commonwealth Games =

- CGF code: BOT
- CGA: Botswana National Olympic Committee
- Website: bnoc.org.bw

in Christchurch, New Zealand
- Competitors: 7 in 2 sports
- Medals: Gold 0 Silver 0 Bronze 0 Total 0

British Commonwealth Games appearances
- 1974; 1978; 1982; 1986; 1990; 1994; 1998; 2002; 2006; 2010; 2014; 2018; 2022; 2026; 2030

Botswana competed at the 1974 British Commonwealth Games. They were represented by seven athletes in two sports.

== Athletics ==
Men's 400 metres

- Wilfred Kareng
- Blackie Masalila

Men's 800 metres

- Samuel Ditsele
- John Rantao

== Cycling (track) ==
Men's 10 mile scratch race

- Stanley Nthupisang
- Jack Ntshweu

Men's 4000 metre individual pursuit

- Stanley Nthupisang

== Sources ==
- Official results by country
