= Botswana at the Olympics =

- IOC code: BOT
- NOC: Botswana National Olympic Committee
- Medals Ranked 102nd: Gold 1 Silver 2 Bronze 1 Total 4

Summer appearances
- 1980; 1984; 1988; 1992; 1996; 2000; 2004; 2008; 2012; 2016; 2020; 2024

Botswana has competed in 12 Summer Olympic Games since its debut in 1980. The nation has never participated in the Winter Olympic Games.

Botswana won its inaugural medal at the 2012 Summer Olympics with Nijel Amos getting a silver in the 800m. The men's 4 × 400 relay team won a bronze medal at the 2020 Summer Olympics.

In 2024, sprinter Letsile Tebogo won Botswana's first-ever Olympic gold medal after winning the men's 200 metres, also becoming the first African to win the title.

== Olympic overview ==
Along with many other African nations, Botswana has yet to compete in a Winter Olympics.

=== 1980 Summer Olympics ===
Botswana's debut was at the 1980 Summer Olympics, in Moscow. They sent seven men and no women to participate in the 1980 Summer Olympics. They did not win a single medal at the 1980 Summer Olympics. All athletes participated in athletics.

=== 2012 Summer Olympics ===
Nijel Amos won a silver medal in the men's 800 m, Botswana's first ever medal.

=== 2024 Summer Olympics ===
21 year old Letsile Tebogo won the gold medal in the men's 200m in a time of 19.46s, breaking his own African record set at the 2023 London Athletics Meet. Tebogo subsequently anchored the relay team in the 4 × 400m, in which they won silver in a time of 2:54.53, the third fastest time in history, and a new African record.

== Medal tables ==
=== Medals by Summer Games ===
| Games | Athletes | Gold | Silver | Bronze | Total | Rank | Ref(s) |
| (Soviet Union) 1980 Moscow | 7 | 0 | 0 | 0 | 0 | – | |
| (United States) 1984 Los Angeles | 7 | 0 | 0 | 0 | 0 | – | |
| (South Korea) 1988 Seoul | 8 | 0 | 0 | 0 | 0 | – | |
| (Spain) 1992 Barcelona | 6 | 0 | 0 | 0 | 0 | – | |
| (United States) 1996 Atlanta | 7 | 0 | 0 | 0 | 0 | – | |
| (Australia) 2000 Sydney | 7 | 0 | 0 | 0 | 0 | – | |
| (Greece) 2004 Athens | 10 | 0 | 0 | 0 | 0 | – | |
| (China) 2008 Beijing | 12 | 0 | 0 | 0 | 0 | – | |
| (United Kingdom) 2012 London | 4 | 0 | 1 | 0 | 1 | 69 | |
| (Brazil) 2016 Rio de Janeiro | 12 | 0 | 0 | 0 | 0 | – | |
| (Japan) 2020 Tokyo | 13 | 0 | 0 | 1 | 1 | 86 | |
| (France) 2024 Paris | 11 | 1 | 1 | 0 | 2 | 55 | |
| (United States) 2028 Los Angeles | future event | | | | | | |
| (Australia) 2032 Brisbane | future event | | | | | | |
| Total | | 1 | 2 | 1 | 4 | 102 | |

=== Medals by sport ===
| Sport | Gold | Silver | Bronze | Total |
|---|---|---|---|---|
| Athletics | 1 | 2 | 1 | 4 |
| Totals (1 entries) | 1 | 2 | 1 | 4 |

== List of medalists ==
Botswana has won four medals in its Olympic lifespan, a gold medal, two silver medals, and a bronze medal.

| Medal | Name | Games | Sport | Event | Date |
|---|---|---|---|---|---|
| Silver | Nijel Amos | 2012 London | Athletics | Men's 800 metres | 9 August 2012 |
| Bronze | Isaac Makwala; Bayapo Ndori; Zibane Ngozi; Baboloki Thebe | 2020 Tokyo | Athletics | Men's 4 × 400 metres relay | 7 August 2021 |
| Gold | Letsile Tebogo | 2024 Paris | Athletics | Men's 200 metres | 8 August 2024 |
| Silver | Busang Kebinatshipi; Bayapo Ndori; Anthony Pesela; Letsile Tebogo | 2024 Paris | Athletics | Men's 4 × 400 metres relay | 10 August 2024 |

== Flagbearers ==
| # | Games | Season | Flag bearer | Sport | Ref. |
|---|---|---|---|---|---|
| 1 | (Soviet Union) Moscow 1980 | Summer | | | |
| 2 | (United States) Los Angeles 1984 | Summer | Norman Mangoye | Official | |
| 3 | (South Korea) Seoul 1988 | Summer | Shakes Kubuitsile | Boxing | |
| 4 | (Spain) Barcelona 1992 | Summer | | | |
| 5 | (United States) Atlanta 1996 | Summer | Justice Dipeba | Athletics | |
| 6 | (Australia) Sydney 2000 | Summer | Gilbert Khunwane | Boxing | |
| 7 | (Greece) Athens 2004 | Summer | Khumiso Ikgopoleng | Boxing | |
| 8 | (China) Beijing 2008 | Summer | Samantha Paxinos | Swimming | |
| 9 | (United Kingdom) London 2012 | Summer | Amantle Montsho | Athletics | |
| 10 | (Brazil) Rio 2016 | Summer | Nijel Amos | Athletics | |
| 11 | (Japan) Tokyo 2020 | Summer | Rajab Mahommed | Boxing | |
| 11 | (Japan) Tokyo 2020 | Summer | Amantle Montsho | Athletics | |
| 12 | (France) Paris 2024 | Summer | Letsile Tebogo | Athletics | |
| 12 | (France) Paris 2024 | Summer | Maxine Egner | Swimming | |

== See also ==
- Botswana at the Paralympics
