= Lawn bowls at the 2019 Pacific Games =

- Venue: Faleata Lawn Bowls Greens
- Location: Apia, Samoa
- Dates: 8–13 July 2019

Lawn bowls at the 2019 Pacific Games in Apia, Samoa was held on 8–13 July 2019. The tournament was played on the Faleata Lawn Bowls Greens at Tuanaimato. Medals were awarded in separate men's and women's lawn bowls events for singles, pairs, triples and fours.

== Teams ==
The nations competing were:

- Cook Islands
- Fiji
- Niue
- Norfolk Island
- Papua New Guinea
- Samoa
- Tokelau
- Tonga

== Medal summary ==
=== Medal table ===
* Host nation (Samoa)

Rank	Nation	Gold	Silver	Bronze	Total
1	Fiji	3	2	3	8
2	Norfolk Island	2	2	0	4
3	Samoa*	1	2	0	3
4	Cook Islands	1	1	2	4
5	Niue	1	1	1	3
6	Tokelau	0	0	1	1
6	Tonga	0	0	1	1
Totals (7 entries)		8	8	8	24

=== Men ===
Event	Gold	Silver	Bronze	Ref.
Singles	Semesa Naiseruvati; Fiji	Iva Tiatin; Samoa	Adoni Wichman-Raioa; Cook Islands	
Pairs	Samoa; Lealaiauloto Tiatia; Tupai Avala Savaaiinaea	Fiji; David Aitcheson; Rajnesh Prasad	Tokelau; Konelio Luka; Sagato Avito Alefosio	
Triples	Fiji; Abdul Kalim; Kushal Pillay; Semesa Naiseruvati	Cook Islands; Lawrence Paniani; Royden Aperau; Adoni Wichman-Raioa	Niue; Mark Blumsky; Dalton Tagelagi; Norma Mitimeti	
Fours	Cook Islands; Aidan Zittersteijn; Taiki Paniani; Royden Aperau; Lawrence Paniani	Norfolk Island; Garry Ryan; Garry Bigg; Stephen Matthews; Trev Gow	Fiji; David Aitcheson; Rajnesh Prasad; Abdul Kalim; Kushal Pillay	

=== Women ===
Event	Gold	Silver	Bronze	Ref.
Singles	Litia Tikoisuva; Fiji	Shae Wilson; Norfolk Island	Paris Baker; Tonga	
Pairs	Norfolk Island; Shae Wilson; Petal Jones	Fiji; Loretta Kotoisuva; Sheral Mar	Cook Islands; Tangata Van Eijk; Teremoana Tou	
Triples	Niue; Josephine Peyroux; Pauline Rex-Blumsky; Christine Ioane	Samoa; Megaley Kaleopa; Lena Adams; Repeka Aluni	Fiji; Radhika Prasad; Doreen O'Connor; Litia Tikoisuva	
Fours	Norfolk Island; Travey Wora; Tassie Evans; Ann Snell; Petal Jones	Niue; Josephine Peyroux; Pauline Rex-Blumsky; Pilena Motufoou Vakaafi; Vikatolia Lyah Liumaihetau	Fiji; Sheral Mar; Doreen O'Connor; Loretta Kotoisuva; Radhika Prasad	

== See also ==
- Lawn bowls at the Pacific Games
