= Botswana at the 2004 Summer Olympics =

- IOC code: BOT
- NOC: Botswana National Olympic Committee

in Athens
- Competitors: 10 in 2 sports
- Flag bearer: Khumiso Ikgopoleng
- Medals: Gold 0 Silver 0 Bronze 0 Total 0

Summer Olympics appearances (overview)
- 1980; 1984; 1988; 1992; 1996; 2000; 2004; 2008; 2012; 2016; 2020; 2024

Botswana competed at the 2004 Summer Olympics in Athens, Greece, from 13 to 29 August 2004.

== Athletics ==
Botswana athletes have so far achieved qualifying standards in the following athletics events (up to a maximum of 3 athletes in each event at the 'A' Standard, and 1 at the 'B' Standard).

Men
Track & road events

| Athlete | Event | Heat | | Semifinal | | Final | |
| Athlete | Event | Result | Rank | Result | Rank | Result | Rank |
|---|---|---|---|---|---|---|---|
| Ndabili Bashingili | Marathon | — | | | | 2:18:09 | 25 |
| Glody Dube | 800 m | 1:48.25 | 5 | Did not advance | | | |
| California Molefe | 400 m | 45.88 | 5 | Did not advance | | | |
| Kagiso Kilego; Johnson Kubisa; California Molefe; Oganeditse Moseki*; Gaolesiela Salang | 4 × 400 m relay | 3:03.32 | 5 q | — | | 3:02.49 | 8 |

* Competed only in heats

Field events

| Athlete | Event | Qualification | | Final | |
| Athlete | Event | Distance | Position | Distance | Position |
|---|---|---|---|---|---|
| Gable Garenamotse | Long jump | 7.78 | 25 | Did not advance | |

Women
Track & road events

| Athlete | Event | Heat | | Semifinal | | Final | |
| Athlete | Event | Result | Rank | Result | Rank | Result | Rank |
|---|---|---|---|---|---|---|---|
| Amantle Montsho | 400 m | 53.77 NR | 5 | Did not advance | | | |

Key

- Note–Ranks given for track events are within the athlete's heat only
- Q = Qualified for the next round
- q = Qualified for the next round as a fastest loser or, in field events, by position without achieving the qualifying target
- NR = National record
- N/A = Round not applicable for the event
- Bye = Athlete not required to compete in round

== Boxing ==
Botswana sent two boxers to Athens.

| Athlete | Event | Round of 32 | Round of 16 | Quarterfinals | Semifinals | Final | |
| Athlete | Event | Opposition Result | Opposition Result | Opposition Result | Opposition Result | Opposition Result | Rank |
|---|---|---|---|---|---|---|---|
| Lechedzani Luza | Flyweight | Mesbahi (MAR); L 20–25 | Did not advance | | | | |
| Khumiso Ikgopoleng | Featherweight | Bye | Ganiyu (NGR); L 16–25 | Did not advance | | | |

== See also ==
- Botswana at the 2002 Commonwealth Games
- Botswana at the 2004 Summer Paralympics
