= Leonardo Illut =

Filipino long-distance runner

Personal information
- Nationality: Filipino
- Born: September 21, 1956 (age 69)
- Height: 5 ft 8 in (172 cm)
- Weight: 134 lb (61 kg)

Sport
- Sport: Long-distance running
- Event: Marathon

Leonardo Illut (born September 21, 1956) is a Filipino long-distance runner. He competed in the marathon at the 1984 Summer Olympics. Illut is a native of Cebu.
