= Abdul Kalim =

Fijian lawn bowler (1969–2021)

Personal information
- Born: 11 September 1969 Nadi, Fiji
- Died: 25 July 2021 (aged 51) Suva, Fiji

Sport
- Sport: Lawn bowls
Medal record
Representing Fiji
Asia Pacific Bowls Championships
Bronze medal – third place	2011 Adelaide	pairs
Pacific Games
Gold medal – first place	2019 Samoa	Men's triples

Abdul Kalim (11 September 1969 – 25 July 2021) was a Fijian international lawn bowler.

== Bowls career ==
Kalim won the bronze medal in the pairs with Ratish Lal at the 2011 Asia Pacific Bowls Championships in Adelaide.

He was selected to represent Fiji at the 2014 Commonwealth Games, where he competed in the triples and fours events.

In 2019, he won a gold medal at the Pacific Games in the triples event.
