= Myra Moller =

New Zealand cyclist (born 1984)

- Moller at the 2008 Australian Championships

Personal information
- Full name: Myra Timena Moller
- Born: 1984 (age 41–42) New Zealand
- Height: 1.65 m (5 ft 5 in)

Cycling career
- Sport: Cycling
- Disciplines: Road and mountain bike

Myra Timena Moller (born 1984) is an elite cyclist born in New Zealand. She competes in both mountain biking and road cycling events. Myra is the niece of Olympic marathon bronze medallist, Lorraine Moller, and the daughter of Teniinii and Gary Moller. Myra discovered Mountain Biking at 13. She entered the World Cup Open (Pro Elite grade) aged 17. She represented New Zealand in the Elite Women's Duathlon World Championships in 2005. In 2006, she competed at the Commonwealth Games, held in Melbourne, Australia. She was the first cyclist to represent the Cook Islands at the Commonwealth Games. In 2008, 2009, she competed in the Australian Open Road Championships Road Race.

== Palmarès ==
2002

- 3rd Chile Classic State Series MTB Race, New Mexico, USA
- 8th NZMBA National Mountain Biking Series
- 5th Karapoti Classic 5th

2005

- 3rd PnP Wellington Track Cycling Series
- 3rd PnP Wellington Cycling Time Trial Road Championships, New Zealand
- 3rd 100 km Vaude Highland Fling MTB race, Bundanoon, New South Wales, Australia (representing New Zealand)
- 3rd Sutherland Criterium, Sydney, Australia (mixed)
- 2nd NZ Mountain Bike Marathon Championships, Colville Classic
- 3rd Karapoti Classic Mountain Bike Race, New Zealand
- 1st New Zealand Mountain Biking National Series, Tokoroa, New Zealand

2006

- World Championships, Rotorua, New Zealand
- 9th Commonwealth Games Individual Women's Mountain Biking (representing Cook Islands), Melbourne, Australia
- Oceania Games MTB Championships (representing Cook Islands)
- 5th Karapoti Classic MTB Race, New Zealand
- 3rd NZ National MTB Series, Palmerston North
- 12th NZ National Mountain Bike Championships
- 2nd Meridian Energy Grand Prix Tour, Wellington, New Zealand
