= Taiki Paniani =

Cook Islander lawn bowler (born 1997)

Personal information
- Born: 22 February 1997 (age 29) Rarotonga, Cook Islands

Sport
- Sport: Lawn bowls
Medal record
Representing Cook Islands
Commonwealth Games
Bronze medal – third place	2018 Gold Coast	Men's pairs
Pacific Games
Gold medal – first place	2019 Samoa	Men's fours

Taiki Paniani (born 22 February 1996) is a Cook Island international lawn bowler.

== Bowls career ==
He was born in Rarotonga, Cook Islands and was selected as part of the Cook Islands team for the 2018 Commonwealth Games on the Gold Coast in Queensland where he reached the semi-finals of the Pairs with Aidan Zittersteijn. They then claimed a bronze medal after defeating Malta in the play off to win the first ever medal for the nation.

In 2019, he won a gold medal at the Pacific Games in the fours event.

In 2023, he was selected as part of the team to represent the Cook Islands at the 2023 World Outdoor Bowls Championship. He participated in the men's pairs and the men's fours events.
