= John Kamyuka =

Botswana swimmer (born 1989)

Personal information
- Full name: John Kamyuka
- National team: Botswana
- Born: 11 January 1989 (age 37) Gaborone, Botswana
- Height: 1.75 m (5 ft 9 in)
- Weight: 52 kg (115 lb)

Sport
- Sport: Swimming
- Strokes: Freestyle

John Kamyuka (born January 11, 1989) is a Botswana swimmer, who specialized in sprint freestyle events. He became one of the first ever Botswana swimmers, alongside Samantha Paxinos to compete at the 2008 Summer Olympics, finishing among the top 75 in the men's 50 m freestyle.

Kamyuka received a Universality invitation from FINA to compete as a lone male swimmer for the Botswana team in the 50 m freestyle at the 2008 Summer Olympics in Beijing. Swimming in heat five, Kamyuka raced his way to sixth place in a splash-and-dash finish with a lifetime best of 25.54 seconds. Kamyuka failed to advance into the semifinals, as he placed seventy-second overall out of ninety-seven swimmers in the prelims.
