= Patric Nyambariro-Nhauro =

Zimbabwean long-distance runner

Personal information
- Nationality: Zimbabwean
- Born: 1 August 1957 (age 68)

Sport
- Sport: Long-distance running
- Event: Marathon

Patric Nyambariro-Nhauro (born 1 August 1957) is a Zimbabwean long-distance runner. He competed in the marathon at the 1984 Summer Olympics.
