= Kimurgor Ngeny =

Kenyan long-distance runner

Personal information
- Nationality: Kenyan
- Born: 10 July 1951 (age 75)

Sport
- Sport: Long-distance running
- Event: Marathon

Kimurgor Ngeny (born 10 July 1951) is a Kenyan long-distance runner. He competed in the marathon at the 1984 Summer Olympics.
