= Aidan Zittersteijn =

Cook Islander lawn bowler (born 1999)

Personal information
- Nationality: Cook Islander
- Born: 8 September 1999 (age 26) New Plymouth, New Zealand

Sport
- Sport: Lawn bowls
Medal record
Representing Cook Islands
Commonwealth Games
Bronze medal – third place	2018 Gold Coast	Men's pairs
Pacific Games
Gold medal – first place	2019 Samoa	Men's fours

Aidan Zittersteijn (born 8 September 1999) is a Cook Island international lawn bowler.

== Bowls career ==
He was born in New Plymouth, New Zealand and was selected as part of the Cook Islands team for the 2018 Commonwealth Games on the Gold Coast in Queensland where he reached the semi-finals of the Pairs with Taiki Paniani. They then claimed a bronze medal after defeating Malta in the play off to win the first ever medal for the nation.

In 2019, he won a gold medal at the Pacific Games in the fours event. In 2022, he competed in the men's triples and the men's fours at the 2022 Commonwealth Games.

In 2023, he was selected as part of the team to represent the Cook Islands at the 2023 World Outdoor Bowls Championship. He participated in the men's pairs and the men's fours events.
