= Samantha Paxinos =

Botswanian swimmer

Personal information
- Full name: Samantha Paxinos
- National team: Botswana
- Born: 25 February 1988 (age 38) Gaborone, Botswana
- Height: 1.65 m (5 ft 5 in)
- Weight: 60 kg (132 lb)

Sport
- Sport: Swimming
- Strokes: Freestyle

Samantha Paxinos (born 25 February 1988) is a Botswana swimmer, who specialized in sprint freestyle events. She became one of the first-ever Botswana swimmers, alongside John Kamyuka, to compete at the 2008 Summer Olympics, and the first female to carry the nation's flag in the opening ceremony. At the games she swam in heat three, but fell behind Olivia Aya Nakitanda of Uganda by more than half a second, failing to advance to the semifinals.

== Background ==
Paxinos was tutored in swimming under Darrell Morton from the age of 9, attending his School of Swimming. At the time, swimming in the country was undeveloped. In the late 1990s, Morton met with the Botswana National Sports Council to establish a swimming Federation in Botswana. The Botswana Swimming Sports Association was formed, and the Darrell Morton School of Swimming opened in 1999. The school has since grown to over 900 swimmers. She is coached by Allison La Grange.

Paxinos competed in the 2007 All-Africa Games in Algeria, and competed in the Sub-Sahara championships in Malawi and the World Championships in Manchester in 2008.

== 2008 Summer Olympics ==
Paxinos received a Universality invitation from FINA to compete as a lone female swimmer for the Botswana team in the 50 m freestyle at the 2008 Summer Olympics in Beijing. She was just one of two female Botswana athletes to compete at the games, the other being hurdler Amantle Montsho. At the time Minister of Youth, Sports and Culture, Gladys Kokorwe, expressed concern about the lack of female participation from the country. Paxinos was quoted as saying: "There was a time when I thought I was not going to the Olympics, but I got excited when I was reinstated to the team. But right now, I am nervous because it is not easy to compete at the Olympics. But at the same time, I am honoured to be going out there to represent my country." Swimming as the fastest entrant in heat three, Paxinos scorched her way to the top of the field, but fell behind the winner Olivia Aya Nakitanda of Uganda by more than half a second with a second-place time in 29.91. Paxinos failed to advance into the semifinals, as she placed seventieth overall out of ninety-two swimmers in the prelims.

Olympic Games
Preceded by Khumiso Ikgopoleng	Flagbearer for Botswana; Beijing 2008	Succeeded by Amantle Montsho
