= Arjun Pandit (athlete) =

Nepalese marathon runner (born 1959)

Arjun Pandit (born 21 June 1959) is a retired male marathon runner from Nepal. He represented his native country in the men's marathon at the 1984 Summer Olympics in Los Angeles, finishing 63rd.
