= Shakes Kubuitsile =

Botswana boxer (born 1962)

Personal information
- Nationality: Botswana
- Born: 3 February 1962 (age 63)

Sport
- Sport: Boxing

Shakes Kubuitsile (born 3 February 1962) is a Botswana boxer. He competed in the men's lightweight event at the 1988 Summer Olympics.

Olympic Games
Preceded by Norman Mangoye	Flagbearer for Botswana; 1988 Seoul	Succeeded by Justice Dipeba
