= Botswana at the 1990 Commonwealth Games =

- CGF code: BOT
- CGA: Botswana National Olympic Committee
- Website: bnoc.org.bw

in Auckland, New Zealand
- Competitors: 23 in 2 sports
- Medals: Gold 0 Silver 0 Bronze 0 Total 0

Commonwealth Games appearances (overview)
- 1974; 1978; 1982; 1986; 1990; 1994; 1998; 2002; 2006; 2010; 2014; 2018; 2022; 2026; 2030

Botswana competed at the 1990 Commonwealth Games. They sent twenty-three athletes in two sports, including their first participation in a field event.

== Sources ==
- Official results by country
