= Lawn bowls at the 2018 Commonwealth Games – Men's pairs =

Lawn bowls – Men's pairs at the 2018 Commonwealth Games
- Venue: Broadbeach Bowls Club
- Dates: 5 – 9 April 2018
- Competitors: 44 from 22 nations

Medalists
gold medal	Daniel Salmon; Marc Wyatt	Wales
silver medal	Paul Foster; Alex Marshall	Scotland
bronze medal	Taiki Paniani; Aidan Zittersteijn	Cook Islands

Lawn bowls men's pairs at the 2018 Commonwealth Games was held at the Broadbeach Bowls Club in the Gold Coast, Australia, from April 5 to 9. A total of 44 athletes from 22 associations participated in the event. Wales' Daniel Salmon and Marc Wyatt won the gold medal, defeating Paul Foster and Alex Marshall from Scotland in the final. Taiki Paniani and Aidan Zittersteijn of the Cook Islands won the bronze medal.

== Sectional play ==
The top two from each section advance to the knockout stage.

=== Section A ===
Rank	Nation	Athletes	MP	MW	MT	ML	FR	AG	PD	PTS
1	Australia	Aaron Wilson & Brett Wilkie	4	4	0	0	85	45	40	12
2	Malta	Brendan Aquilina & Shaun Parnis	4	3	0	1	81	55	26	9
3	Canada	Ryan Bester & Ryan Stadnyk	4	2	0	2	55	66	-11	6
4	Guernsey	Matt Le Ber & Matt Solway	4	1	0	3	59	62	-3	3
5	Brunei	Ampuan Ahad & Pengiran Haji Tengah	4	0	0	4	41	93	-52	0

	Australia	Malta	Canada	Guernsey	Brunei
Australia	—	22–11	15–12	18–15	30–7
Malta	11–22	—	26–12	16–10	28–11
Canada	12–15	12–26	—	16–14	15–11
Guernsey	15–18	10–16	14–16	—	20–12
Brunei	7–30	11–28	11–15	12–20	—

=== Section B ===
Rank	Nation	Athletes	MP	MW	MT	ML	FR	AG	PD	PTS
1	South Africa	Petrus Breitenbach & Jason Evans	4	4	0	0	84	50	34	12
2	Wales	Daniel Salmon & Marc Wyatt	4	3	0	1	97	40	57	9
3	Northern Ireland	Gary Kelly & Ian McClure	4	2	0	2	72	59	13	6
4	Isle of Man	Kenneth McGreal & Mark McGreal	4	1	0	3	51	71	-20	3
5	Jamaica	Mervyn Edwards & Andrew Newell	4	0	0	4	26	110	-84	0

	South Africa	Wales	Northern Ireland	Isle of Man	Jamaica
South Africa	—	17–15	20–16	19–13	28–6
Wales	15–17	—	27–8	22–11	33–4
Northern Ireland	16–20	8–27	—	20–6	28–6
Isle of Man	13–19	11–22	6–20	—	21–10
Jamaica	6–28	4–33	6–28	10–21	—

=== Section C ===
Rank	Nation	Athletes	MP	MW	MT	ML	FR	AG	PD	PTS
1	New Zealand	Shannon McIlroy & Blake Signal	5	5	0	0	109	54	55	15
2	Cook Islands	Taiki Paniani & Aidan Zittersteijn	5	4	0	1	82	84	-2	12
3	England	Louis Ridout & Sam Tolchard	5	2	1	2	99	74	25	7
4	Fiji	David Aitcheson & Rajnesh Prasad	5	2	1	2	95	89	6	7
5	Papua New Guinea	Matu Bazo & Gabriel Tika	5	1	0	4	76	101	-25	3
6	Botswana	Edwin Nyoka & Kitso Robert	5	0	0	5	53	112	-59	0

	New Zealand	Cook Islands	England	Fiji	Papua New Guinea	Botswana
New Zealand	—	26–12	14–12	18–11	24–11	27–8
Cook Islands	12–26	—	15–13	22–17	18–14	15–14
England	12–14	13–15	—	22–22	28–14	24–9
Fiji	11–18	17–22	22–22	—	20–16	25–11
Papua New Guinea	11–24	14–18	14–28	16–20	—	21–11
Botswana	8–27	14–15	9–24	11–25	11–21	—

=== Section D ===
Rank	Nation	Athletes	MP	MW	MT	ML	FR	AG	PD	PTS
1	Scotland	Paul Foster & Alex Marshall	5	5	0	0	109	50	59	15
2	Malaysia	Fairul Izwan & Muhammad Hizlee Abdul Rais	5	4	0	1	103	65	38	12
3	Norfolk Island	John Christian & Timothy Sheridan	5	3	0	2	84	57	27	9
4	India	Alok Lakra & Krishna Xalxo	5	2	0	3	87	71	16	6
5	Niue	Mark Blumsky & Dalton Tagelagi	5	1	0	4	56	101	-45	3
6	Samoa	Edward Bell & Herbert Bell	5	0	0	5	39	134	-95	0

	Scotland	Malaysia	Norfolk Island	India	Niue	Samoa
Scotland	—	27–9	14–12	17–11	14–11	37–6
Malaysia	9–27	—	21–7	27–13	16–12	30–6
Norfolk Island	12–14	7–21	—	17–7	25–9	23–6
India	12–17	13–27	7–17	—	29–6	26–4
Niue	11–14	12–16	9–25	6–29	—	18–17
Samoa	6–37	6–30	6–23	4–26	17–18	—

== Knockout stage ==
Quarterfinal
A1	Australia	13
A2	Malta	15
D1	Scotland	16
D2	Malaysia	11
B1	South Africa	14
C2	Cook Islands	15
C1	New Zealand	7
B2	Wales	20

Semifinal
A2	Malta	8
D1	Scotland	18
C2	Cook Islands	14
B2	Wales	21

Finals
D1	Scotland	10
B2	Wales	12
Third place
A2	Malta	11
C2	Cook Islands	17
