= Vincent Rakabaele =

Lesotho long-distance runner

Personal information
- Nationality: Lesotho
- Born: 3 September 1948
- Died: 2 November 2003 (aged 55)

Sport
- Sport: Long-distance running
- Event: Marathon

Gabashane Vincent Rakabaele (3 September 1948 – 2 November 2003) was a Lesotho long-distance runner. He competed in the marathon at the 1980 Summer Olympics and the 1984 Summer Olympics.
