= Johnson Mbangiwa =

Motswana long-distance runner

Personal information
- Nationality: Botswana
- Born: 28 February 1956 (age 70)

Sport
- Sport: Long-distance running
- Event: Marathon

Johnson Mbangiwa (born 28 February 1956) is a Motswana long-distance runner. He competed in the marathon at the 1984 Summer Olympics.
