= Kebapetse Gaseitsiwe =

Botswana sprinter

Personal information
- Nationality: Botswana
- Born: 14 November 1966 (age 59)

Sport
- Sport: Sprinting
- Event: 4 × 400 metres relay

Kebapetse Gaseitsiwe (born 14 November 1966) is a Botswana sprinter. He competed in the men's 4 × 400 metres relay at the 1988 Summer Olympics.
