= Pearl Morake =

Botswana boxer

Personal information
- Full name: Tsitsi Pearl Morake-Mooketsi
- Nickname: Mis P
- Born: February 15, 1986 (age 40) Matsiloje, Botswana

Sport
- Sport: Boxing
- Weight class: Middleweight
- Club: Botho College Boxing Club

Pearl Morake (born 15 September 1989) is a Botswana boxer, who was the first female boxer to compete for her country. She is a multi-time national champion and competed at the 2014 Commonwealth Games in Glasgow, Scotland.

== Career ==
Pearl Morake was born on 15 September 1989 in Mochudi, Botswana. She initially played netball, until being introduced to boxing in 2010. Competing for the Botho College Boxing Club, she competed in Botswana's first national tournament for female boxers, with her bout against Katlego Olatotse lauded in the media as the most exciting of the night. Morake was the first woman to represent Botswana at an international level in boxing, and over the next few years became the national champion on four occasions.

Morake competed at the 2014 Commonwealth Games in Glasgow, Scotland. She was seeded for the Middleweight tournament, which meant that she only need to win a single match to be sure of a bronze medal. She fought England's Savannah Marshall but lost 3–0. Marshall went on to win the gold medal. In 2015, she was named Sportswoman of the Year at the Botswana National Sports Commission Awards. She also named Female Boxer of the Year by the Botswana Boxing Association.
