= Bigboy Matlapeng =

Motswana long-distance runner

Personal information
- Nationality: Motswana
- Born: 4 February 1958 (age 68)

Sport
- Sport: Long-distance running
- Event: Marathon

Bigboy Josie Matlapeng (born 4 February 1958) is a Motswana long-distance runner and sprinter. He competed in the marathon at the 1984 Summer Olympics and the 1988 Summer Olympics.

== Career ==
Matlapeng had a marathon personal best of 2:33:34 hours going into the 1984 Olympic marathon. He was described sarcastically as a "household name" by commentators, mocking his unusual-sounding name in the "wonderfully monikered" field. He started the Olympic marathon, but did not finish the race.

By 1986, Matlapang had improved his marathon best to 2:17:47, setting a Botswanan record and making him a favorite to break the course record at the 1986 Churchdown 10-mile Beer Race in Gloucestershire. Though he underperformed at the Beer Race, he was selected to represent Botswana at the 1986 Commonwealth Games in the marathon, where he placed 14th. Surprisingly, Matlapeng moved down in distance by a factor of over 100 times to compete in the Botswanan 4 × 400 m relay team after the marathon, though his team was disqualified and didn't advance to the finals. Matlapeng's performance in such disparate events led to debate about the seriousness of the Commonwealth Games.

Matlapeng qualified for his first World Championships at the 1987 World Championships in Athletics, where he competed in the marathon. He finished 29th in a time of 2:24:43 and was again lauded for his name. At the 1988 Olympic Games marathon, Matlapeng finished 34th in 2:20:51. He competed again at the 1990 Commonwealth Games in the marathon, finishing 14th again.

Matlapeng competed at the 1987 and 1989 editions of the World Marathon Cup, finishing 66th and 57th respectively.
