= Khumiso Ikgopoleng =

Botswana boxer (born 1979)

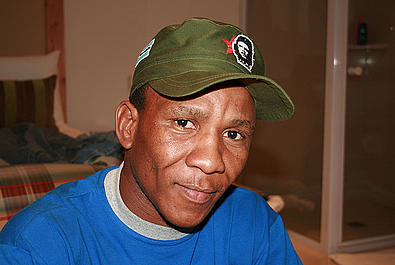

Personal information
- Full name: Khumiso Stephen Ikgopoleng
- Nationality: Botswana
- Born: December 5, 1979 (age 46) Good Hope, Botswana
- Height: 1.68 m (5 ft 6 in)
- Weight: 54 kg (119 lb)

Sport
- Sport: Boxing
- Weight class: Featherweight
- Club: Tsholofelo Boxing Club, Gaborone
Medal record
2004 Africa championship Olympic Qualifiers, Medal Gold
2007 Algiers Medal Bronze 2008 1st AIBA President Cup, Taiwan Medal Bronze

Khumiso Stephen Ikgopoleng (born 5 December 1979) is a coach and former boxer from Botswana, who competed at the 2004 Summer Olympics in Athens, Greece. There he was eliminated in the second round of the men's featherweight (– 57 kg) division by Nigeria's Muideen Ganiyu.

Ikgopoleng carried the flag of Botswana at the opening ceremony of the Athens Games. He qualified by winning the gold medal at the 2nd AIBA African 2004 Olympic Qualifying Tournament in Gaborone, Botswana. In the final, he defeated South Africa's Ludumo Galada. He dropped down to the bantamweight division afterward and qualified at this weight class for the 2008 Olympics when he was placed 5th at the Beijing Olympics after losing in the quarter-finals. He competed in the 2008 Boxing World Cup in Russia and was placed 5th. He retired from professional boxing in February 2009. In 2012, he was the coach for the Botswana Olympic boxing team and was at the London Olympics that year. He continued as head coach of the Botswana senior boxing team until 2015 when he became a coach at The Corner Boxing Club in Boulder, Colorado, United States.

Olympic Games
Preceded by Gilbert Khunwane	Flagbearer for Botswana; Athens 2004	Succeeded by Samantha Paxinos
