= Wilson Theleso =

Motswana athlete

Personal information
- Nationality: Botswana
- Born: 25 June 1960 (age 66)

Sport
- Sport: Long-distance running
- Event: Marathon

Wilson Theleso (born 25 June 1960) is a Motswana long-distance runner. He competed in the marathon at the 1984 Summer Olympics.
