= Justice Dipeba =

Botswana sprinter

Personal information
- Nationality: Botswana
- Born: December 3, 1973 (age 52)

Sport
- Sport: Track and field
- Event: 200 meters

Achievements and titles
- Personal best: 200 m: 20.70 s
Medal record
Men's athletics
Representing Botswana
African Championships
| Bronze medal – third place | 1996 Yaoundé | 200 m |

Justice Dipeba (born 3 December 1973) is an Olympic athlete from Botswana who competed at the 1996 Summer Olympics. He competed at the Men's 200 metres event representing Botswana. However, he was placed 5th at 21.09 in Heat 10, and thus did not advance any further. In addition, Dipeba was also the flag bearer of Botswana during the 1996 Summer Olympics opening ceremony.

Dipeba is now a personal coach of Botswana sprinter Isaac Makwala.

Olympic Games
| Preceded by Shakes Kubuitsile | Flagbearer for Botswana; 1996 Atlanta | Succeeded by Gilbert Khunwane |
