= Botswana National Olympic Committee =

National Olympic Committee

- Country: Botswana
- Code: BOT
- Created: 1978
- Recognized: 1980
- Continental Association: ANOCA
- President: Botsang Tshenyego
- Secretary General: Tebogo Kesupile
- Website: botswananoc.org

The Botswana National Olympic Committee (IOC code: BOT) is the National Olympic Committee representing Botswana. It is also the body responsible for Botswana's representation at the Commonwealth Games.

The Botswana National Olympic Committee (BNOC) has facilitated Botswana's participation at the Summer Olympic Games since 1980, with the country participating ever since. They have never participated in the Winter Olympics.

The BNOC was behind Botswana's successful bid for the 2nd African Youth Games that the country hosted from 22 to 31 May 2014. The BNOC seconded a few of its staff members, including Chief Executive Tuelo Serufho, to the Organising Committee of the 2nd African Youth Games that were known as Gaborone 2014.

== See also ==
- Botswana at the Olympics
- Botswana at the Commonwealth Games
