= 2004 European Athletics Indoor Cup – results =

These are the full results of the 2004 European Athletics Indoor Cup which was held on 14 February 2004 at the Arena Leipzig in Leipzig, Germany.

== Men's results ==
=== 60 metres ===
| Rank | Lane | Name | Nationality | Time | Notes | Points |
|---|---|---|---|---|---|---|
| 1 | 6 | Jason Gardener | Great Britain | 6.51 | | 9 |
| 2 | 1 | Simone Collio | Italy | 6.63 | FS1 | 7 |
| 3 | 8 | Łukasz Chyła | Poland | 6.65 | | 6 |
| 4 | 3 | Alexander Kosenkow | Germany | 6.68 | | 5 |
| 5 | 5 | Ronald Pognon | France | 6.71 | | 4 |
| 6 | 7 | Aleksandr Smirnov | Russia | 6.74 | | 3 |
| 7 | 4 | Patrik Lövgren | Sweden | 6.78 | | 2 |
| 8 | 2 | Maarten Heisen | Netherlands | 6.83 | | 1 |

=== 400 metres ===
| Rank | Heat | Name | Nationality | Time | Notes | Points |
|---|---|---|---|---|---|---|
| 1 | B | Dmitry Forshev | Russia | 46.46 | PB | 9 |
| 2 | B | Brice Panel | France | 47.05 | | 7 |
| 3 | B | Robert Tobin | Great Britain | 47.26 | | 6 |
| 4 | A | Andrea Barberi | Italy | 47.64 | =SB | 5 |
| 5 | A | Piotr Długosielski | Poland | 47.75 | | 4 |
| 6 | A | Sebastian Gatzka | Germany | 48.13 | | 3 |
| 7 | B | Tomas Nikitin | Sweden | 48.29 | SB | 2 |
| 8 | A | Jelle Heisen | Netherlands | 48.44 | PB | 1 |

=== 800 metres ===
| Rank | Name | Nationality | Time | Notes | Points |
|---|---|---|---|---|---|
| 1 | Bram Som | Netherlands | 1:48.79 | | 9 |
| 2 | René Herms | Germany | 1:49.14 | | 7 |
| 3 | Rickard Pell | Sweden | 1:49.40 | SB | 6 |
| 4 | Jimmy Lomba | France | 1:49.47 | | 5 |
| 5 | Sergey Kozhevnikov | Russia | 1:49.81 | | 4 |
| 6 | Mirosław Formela | Poland | 1:49.83 | | 3 |
| 7 | Chris Moss | Great Britain | 1:51.04 | | 2 |
| 8 | Christian Neunhauserer | Italy | 1:51.15 | | 1 |

=== 1500 metres ===
| Rank | Name | Nationality | Time | Notes | Points |
|---|---|---|---|---|---|
| 1 | Mounir Yemmouni | France | 3:49.82 | | 9 |
| 2 | Matt Shone | Great Britain | 3:49.91 | | 7 |
| 3 | Zbigniew Graczyk | Poland | 3:50.31 | | 6 |
| 4 | Lorenzo Perrone | Italy | 3:50.70 | | 5 |
| 5 | Marko Koers | Netherlands | 3:51.08 | | 4 |
| 6 | Franek Haschke | Germany | 3:51.30 | | 3 |
| 7 | Aleksandr Krivchinkov | Russia | 3:51.63 | | 2 |
| 8 | John Lindström | Sweden | 3:54.19 | | 1 |

=== 3000 metres ===
| Rank | Name | Nationality | Time | Notes | Points |
|---|---|---|---|---|---|
| 1 | Gert-Jan Liefers | Netherlands | 7:49.70 | NR | 9 |
| 2 | Ismaïl Sghyr | France | 7:51.28 | | 7 |
| 3 | Salvatore Vincenti | Italy | 7:51.89 | PB | 6 |
| 4 | Jan Fitschen | Germany | 7:52.21 | SB | 5 |
| 5 | Yared Shegumo | Poland | 7:54.04 | NR | 4 |
| 6 | Pavel Potapovich | Russia | 7:54.09 | PB | 3 |
| 7 | Erik Sjöqvist | Sweden | 8:02.87 | | 2 |
| 8 | Michael Skinner | Great Britain | 8:09.84 | | 1 |

=== 60 metres hurdles ===
| Rank | Lane | Name | Nationality | Time | Notes | Points |
|---|---|---|---|---|---|---|
| 1 | 5 | Andrea Giaconi | Italy | 7.72 | =SB | 9 |
| 2 | 6 | Gregory Sedoc | Netherlands | 7.80 | | 7 |
| 3 | 2 | Mohamed Silah-Freckelton | Great Britain | 7.81 | | 6 |
| 4 | 7 | Jan Schindzielorz | Germany | 7.82 | FS1 | 5 |
| 5 | 3 | Igor Peremota | Russia | 7.83 | | 4 |
| 6 | 1 | Sébastien Denis | France | 7.84 | | 3 |
| 7 | 4 | Tomasz Ścigaczewski | Poland | 7.89 | SB | 2 |
| | 8 | Robert Kronberg | Sweden | DQ | FS2 R162.7 | 0 |

=== Swedish relay (800/600/400/200 metres) ===
| Rank | Nation | Athletes | Time | Note | Points |
|---|---|---|---|---|---|
| 1 | Russia | Dmitriy Bogdanov, Andrey Rudnitskiy, Aleksandr Usov, Oleg Sergeyev | 4:12.26 | | 9 |
| 2 | Netherlands | Arnoud Okken, Bram Som, Guus Hoogmoed, Patrick van Balkom | 4:12.52 | | 7 |
| 3 | Germany | Andreas Freimann, Ruwen Faller, Bastian Swillms, Tobias Unger | 4:14.65 | | 6 |
| 4 | France | Thomas Planque, Antoine Martiak, Olivier Galy, Jimmy Melfort | 4:15.70 | | 5 |
| 5 | Italy | Francesco Roncalli, Livio Sciandra, Luca Galletti, Massimiliano Donati | 4:16.05 | | 4 |
| 6 | Poland | Grzegorz Krzosek, Artur Gąsiewski, Daniel Dąbrowski, Łukasz Chyła | 4:16.10 | | 3 |
| 7 | Great Britain | Chris Reynolds, Tim Bayley, Adam Potter, Graham Beashey | 4:19.90 | | 2 |
| 8 | Sweden | Rizak Dirshe, Rickard Pell, Albin Johansson, Lenny Martinez | 4:21.52 | | 1 |

=== Pole vault ===
| Rank | Name | Nationality | 5.00 | 5.20 | 5.40 | 5.55 | 5.65 | 5.70 | 5.75 | Result | Notes | Points |
|---|---|---|---|---|---|---|---|---|---|---|---|---|
| 1 | Björn Otto | Germany | – | o | o | o | o | xo | xxx | 5.70 | =SB | 9 |
| 2 | Igor Pavlov | Russia | – | – | o | – | o | – | xxx | 5.65 | | 7 |
| 3 | Patrik Kristiansson | Sweden | – | – | – | xo | xx– | x | | 5.55 | | 6 |
| 4 | Romain Mesnil | Sweden | – | – | xo | xxo | x– | xx | | 5.55 | | 5 |
| 5 | Rens Blom | Netherlands | – | – | o | xxx | | | | 5.40 | | 4 |
| 6 | Przemysław Czerwiński | Poland | o | o | xxx | | | | | 5.20 | | 3 |
| 7 | Matteo Rubbiani | Italy | xo | o | xxx | | | | | 5.20 | | 2 |
| | Ashley Swain | Great Britain | xxx | | | | | | | NM | | 0 |

=== Triple jump ===
| Rank | Name | Nationality | #1 | #2 | #3 | #4 | Result | Notes | Points |
|---|---|---|---|---|---|---|---|---|---|
| 1 | Christian Olsson | Sweden | 17.31 | 17.08 | x | 16.77 | 17.31 | SB | 9 |
| 2 | Viktor Gushchinskiy | Russia | 16.69 | 16.26 | x | 16.94 | 16.94 | | 7 |
| 3 | Fabrizio Donato | Italy | 16.07 | 16.46 | 16.65 | 16.43 | 16.65 | SB | 6 |
| 4 | Julien Kapek | Germany | x | x | 16.48 | x | 16.48 | | 5 |
| 5 | Jacek Kazimierowski | Poland | 16.28 | 16.39 | 16.21 | 16.28 | 16.39 | | 4 |
| 6 | Charles Friedek | Poland | 15.76 | x | 15.63 | x | 15.76 | | 3 |
| 7 | Femi Akinsanya | Great Britain | 15.57 | x | x | x | 15.57 | | 2 |
| 8 | Martijn Delissen | Netherlands | x | x | 14.63 | x | 14.63 | SB | 1 |

== Women's results ==
=== 60 metres ===
| Rank | Lane | Name | Nationality | Time | Notes | Points |
|---|---|---|---|---|---|---|
| 1 | 7 | Larisa Kruglova | Russia | 7.27 | SB | 9 |
| 2 | 5 | Gabriele Rockmeier | Germany | 7.29 | | 7 |
| 3 | 6 | Evangelia Nessoudi | Greece | 7.31 | FS1 | 6 |
| 4 | 1 | Tatyana Tkalich | Ukraine | 7.36 | | 5 |
| 5 | 4 | Małgorzata Flejszar | Poland | 7.38 | PB | 4 |
| 6 | 3 | Joice Maduaka | Great Britain | 7.39 | | 3 |
| 7 | 8 | Frédérique Bangué | France | 7.42 | | 2 |
| 8 | 2 | Carme Blay | Spain | 7.45 | | 1 |

=== 400 metres ===
| Rank | Heat | Name | Nationality | Time | Notes | Points |
|---|---|---|---|---|---|---|
| 1 | B | Olesya Krasnomovets | Russia | 51.31 | PB | 9 |
| 2 | B | Claudia Marx | Germany | 52.01 | SB | 7 |
| 3 | A | Antonina Yefremova | Ukraine | 52.41 | SB | 6 |
| 4 | A | Catherine Murphy | Great Britain | 52.53 | SB | 5 |
| 5 | B | Chrysoula Goudenoudi | Germany | 52.82 | NR | 4 |
| 6 | B | Grażyna Prokopek | Poland | 52.87 | | 3 |
| 7 | A | Cora Olivero | Spain | 54.26 | PB | 2 |
| | A | Marie-Louise Bévis | France | DQ | R163.3 | 0 |

=== 800 metres ===
| Rank | Name | Nationality | Time | Notes | Points |
|---|---|---|---|---|---|
| 1 | Olga Raspopova | Russia | 2:00.41 | PB | 9 |
| 2 | Joanne Fenn | Great Britain | 2:00.54 | | 7 |
| 3 | Tatyana Petlyuk | Ukraine | 2:01.14 | PB | 6 |
| 4 | Mayte Martínez | Spain | 2:01.58 | | 5 |
| 5 | Monika Gradzki | Germany | 2:02.01 | PB | 4 |
| 6 | Virginie Fouquet | France | 2:03.71 | | 3 |
| 7 | Joanna Kaczor | Poland | 2:07.18 | PB | 2 |
| 8 | Maria Papadopoulou | Greece | 2:07.44 | | 1 |

=== 1500 metres ===
| Rank | Name | Nationality | Time | Notes | Points |
|---|---|---|---|---|---|
| 1 | Iryna Lishchynska | Ukraine | 4:09.82 | | 9 |
| 2 | Yuliya Kosenkova | Russia | 4:10.24 | SB | 7 |
| 3 | Maria Martins | France | 4:12.87 | | 6 |
| 4 | Irina Mikitenko | Germany | 4:13.61 | SB | 5 |
| 5 | Wioletta Janowska | Poland | 4:14.12 | PB | 4 |
| 6 | Konstantina Efedaki | Greece | 4:14.34 | | 3 |
| 7 | Zulema Fuentes-Pila | Spain | 4:14.73 | | 2 |
| 8 | Hayley Ovens | Great Britain | 4:20.46 | | 1 |

=== 3000 metres ===
| Rank | Name | Nationality | Time | Notes | Points |
|---|---|---|---|---|---|
| 1 | Yelena Zadorozhnaya | Russia | 8:53.45 | | 9 |
| 2 | Lidia Chojecka | Poland | 8:53.62 | | 7 |
| 3 | Sabrina Mockenhaupt | Germany | 9:01.00 | | 6 |
| 4 | Laurence Duquenoy | France | 9:07.50 | | 5 |
| 5 | María Cristina Petite | Spain | 9:10.77 | SB | 4 |
| 6 | Tatyana Golovchenko | Ukraine | 9:17.61 | PB | 3 |
| 7 | Freya Murray | Great Britain | 9:23.17 | | 2 |
| 8 | Pagona Nika | Greece | 9:40.88 | PB | 1 |

=== 60 metres hurdles ===
| Rank | Lane | Name | Nationality | Time | Notes | Points |
|---|---|---|---|---|---|---|
| 1 | 2 | Flora Redoumi | Germany | 7.97 | NR | 9 |
| 2 | 6 | Glory Alozie | Spain | 7.99 | | 7 |
| 3 | 1 | Juliane Sprenger-Afflerbach | Germany | 8.00 | | 6 |
| 4 | 3 | Natalya Kresova | Russia | 8.00 | =PB | 5 |
| 5 | 8 | Aurelia Trywiańska | Poland | 8.15 | SB | 4 |
| 6 | 4 | Linda Khodadin-Ferga | France | 8.15 | | 3 |
| 7 | 7 | Sarah Claxton | Great Britain | 8.22 | | 2 |
| 8 | 5 | Yevgeniya Snihur | Ukraine | 8.52 | | 1 |

=== Swedish relay (800/600/400/200 metres) ===
| Rank | Nation | Athletes | Time | Note | Points |
|---|---|---|---|---|---|
| 1 | Russia | Irina Vashentseva, Natalya Khrushcheleva, Mariya Lisnichenko, Irina Khabarova | 4:46.14 | | 9 |
| 2 | Germany | Kathleen Friedrich, Maren Schott, Jana Neubert, Birgit Rockmeier | 4:47.92 | | 7 |
| 3 | Great Britain | Becky Lyne, Jenny Meadows, Helen Karagounis, Joice Maduaka | 4:52.18 | | 6 |
| 4 | Ukraine | Galina Misiruk, Tatyana Petlyuk, Natalya Pygyda, Natalya Shuravlyova | 4:52.68 | | 5 |
| 5 | Spain | Esther Desviat, Marlen Estévez, Elena Corcoles, Cristina Sanz | 4:52.85 | | 4 |
| 6 | Poland | Monika Wiśniowska, Małgorzata Pskit, Monika Bejnar, Zuzanna Radecka | 4:55.96 | | 3 |
| 7 | France | Laetitia Valdonado, Peggy Babin, Phara Anacharsis, Véronique Mang | 4:55.99 | | 2 |
| 8 | Greece | Eleni Filandra, Irini Prentza, Eleftheria Papadopoulou, Chrysoula Goudenoudi | 5:08.01 | | 1 |

=== High jump ===
| Rank | Name | Nationality | 1.70 | 1.76 | 1.81 | 1.86 | 1.90 | 1.93 | 1.96 | 1.98 | 2.00 | 2.02 | Result | Notes | Points |
|---|---|---|---|---|---|---|---|---|---|---|---|---|---|---|---|
| 1 | Daniela Rath | Germany | – | – | – | o | o | o | o | o | xo | xxr | 2.00 | =PB | 9 |
| 2 | Yelena Slesarenko | Russia | – | – | o | o | o | xo | o | – | x– | xx | 1.96 | | 7 |
| 3 | Ruth Beitia | Spain | – | o | o | o | o | o | xxx | | | | 1.93 | SB | 5.5 |
| 3 | Vita Styopina | Ukraine | – | o | o | o | o | o | xxx | | | | 1.93 | | 5.5 |
| 5 | Anna Ksok | Poland | – | o | o | o | xo | xxx | | | | | 1.90 | | 4 |
| 6 | Susan Jones | Great Britain | – | – | o | xo | xxx | | | | | | 1.86 | | 3 |
| 7 | Anne Gaëlle Jardin | France | o | o | o | xxx | | | | | | | 1.81 | | 2 |
| 8 | Maria Hotokouridou | Greece | o | o | xxo | xxx | | | | | | | 1.81 | | 1 |

=== Long jump ===
| Rank | Name | Nationality | #1 | #2 | #3 | #4 | Result | Notes | Points |
|---|---|---|---|---|---|---|---|---|---|
| 1 | Irina Simagina | Russia | 6.65 | 6.72 | x | x | 6.72 | =SB | 9 |
| 2 | Sophie Krauel | Germany | 6.41 | 6.46 | x | x | 6.46 | | 7 |
| 3 | Concepción Montaner | Spain | 5.92 | 5.95 | 6.39 | 6.23 | 6.39 | | 6 |
| 4 | Kelly Sotherton | Great Britain | 6.38 | x | 6.38 | 6.30 | 6.38 | PB | 5 |
| 5 | Olena Shekhovtsova | Ukraine | 5.71 | 6.27 | 6.24 | 6.34 | 6.34 | | 4 |
| 6 | Małgorzata Trybańska | Poland | 6.00 | 6.16 | 6.18 | 6.12 | 6.18 | | 3 |
| 7 | Ioanna Kafetzi | Greece | 6.08 | x | 6.17 | x | 6.17 | | 2 |
| 8 | Aurélie Félix | France | 6.11 | 5.98 | 5.97 | 6.12 | 6.12 | | 1 |

=== Shot put ===
| Rank | Name | Nationality | #1 | #2 | #3 | #4 | Result | Notes | Points |
|---|---|---|---|---|---|---|---|---|---|
| 1 | Irina Khudoroshkina | Russia | 17.53 | 17.51 | 18.22 | 18.75 | 18.75 | SB | 9 |
| 2 | Krystyna Zabawska | Poland | 18.50 | 17.98 | x | 18.39 | 18.50 | SB | 7 |
| 3 | Nadine Kleinert | Germany | x | x | x | 18.38 | 18.38 | | 6 |
| 4 | Irini Terzoglou | Greece | 17.39 | 17.21 | x | x | 17.39 | | 5 |
| 5 | Laurence Manfredi | France | 17.36 | x | x | x | 17.36 | | 4 |
| 6 | Martina de la Puente | Spain | 15.70 | 16.55 | 16.23 | x | 16.55 | | 3 |
| 7 | Tatyana Nasonova | Ukraine | 16.15 | x | x | 16.25 | 16.25 | | 2 |
| 8 | Joanne Duncan | Great Britain | 12.78 | 14.02 | 15.36 | 13.84 | 15.36 | | 1 |
