= 2002 European Athletics Championships – Men's 800 metres =

Men's 800 metres at the European Athletics Championships

The men's 800 metres at the 2002 European Athletics Championships were held at the Olympic Stadium on August 9–11.

== Medalists ==
Gold	Silver	Bronze
Wilson Kipketer; Denmark	André Bucher; Switzerland	Nils Schumann; Germany

== Results ==
=== Heats ===
Qualification: First 3 of each heat (Q) and the next 4 fastest (q) qualified for the semifinals.

Rank	Heat	Name	Nationality	Time	Notes
1	4	Nils Schumann	Germany	1:46.90	Q
2	3	René Herms	Germany	1:47.07	Q
3	4	Arnoud Okken	Netherlands	1:47.22	Q
4	3	Wilson Kipketer	Denmark	1:47.29	Q
5	4	Rizak Dirshe	Sweden	1:47.36	Q
6	3	André Bucher	Switzerland	1:47.48	Q
7	1	Antonio Manuel Reina	Spain	1:47.52	Q
7	2	Bram Som	Netherlands	1:47.52	Q
9	2	Paweł Czapiewski	Poland	1:47.53	Q
10	1	Stefan Beumer	Netherlands	1:47.66	Q
11	3	James McIlroy	Great Britain	1:47.67	q
12	2	Joeri Jansen	Belgium	1:47.71	Q
13	4	Florent Lacasse	France	1:47.74	q
14	2	Miguel Quesada	Spain	1:47.85	q
15	3	Grzegorz Krzosek	Poland	1:47.98	q
16	4	Panagiotis Stroubakos	Greece	1:48.00	
17	1	Nicolas Aïssat	France	1:48.07	Q
18	2	Ramil Aritkulov	Russia	1:48.15	
18	3	Dmitriy Bogdanov	Russia	1:48.15	
20	4	Wilson Kirwa	Finland	1:48.23	
21	1	Christian Neunhauserer	Italy	1:48.25	
22	1	Tom Omey	Belgium	1:48.27	
23	2	Vanco Stojanov	Macedonia	1:48.31	
24	2	Franck Barré	France	1:48.68	
25	1	Alibey Sukurov	Azerbaijan	1:49.27	
26	4	Anthony Whiteman	Great Britain	1:50.60	
27	1	Fernando Almeida	Portugal	1:50.81	
28	1	Dominic Carroll	Gibraltar	1:58.22	
	3	Khaled Azerkan	Sweden	DNF	

=== Semifinals ===
Qualification: First 3 of each semifinal (Q) and the next 2 fastest (q) qualified for the final.

Rank	Heat	Name	Nationality	Time	Notes
1	2	Wilson Kipketer	Denmark	1:46.56	Q
2	2	René Herms	Germany	1:46.77	Q
3	2	Nicolas Aïssat	France	1:46.89	Q
4	2	André Bucher	Switzerland	1:47.08	q
5	2	Bram Som	Netherlands	1:47.20	q
6	2	Rizak Dirshe	Sweden	1:47.38	
7	2	Antonio Manuel Reina	Spain	1:47.41	
8	2	Grzegorz Krzosek	Poland	1:47.82	
9	1	Nils Schumann	Germany	1:48.01	Q
10	1	Arnoud Okken	Netherlands	1:48.22	Q
11	1	Paweł Czapiewski	Poland	1:48.37	Q
12	1	Joeri Jansen	Belgium	1:48.62	
13	1	James McIlroy	Great Britain	1:49.15	
14	1	Stefan Beumer	Netherlands	1:49.60	
15	1	Miguel Quesada	Spain	1:49.83	
16	1	Florent Lacasse	France	1:50.82	

=== Final ===
Rank	Name	Nationality	Time	Notes
1st place, gold medalist(s)	Wilson Kipketer	Denmark	1:47.25	
2nd place, silver medalist(s)	André Bucher	Switzerland	1:47.43	
3rd place, bronze medalist(s)	Nils Schumann	Germany	1:47.60	
4	Paweł Czapiewski	Poland	1:47.92	
5	Arnoud Okken	Netherlands	1:48.39	
6	Bram Som	Netherlands	1:48.56	
7	René Herms	Germany	1:48.86	
8	Nicolas Aïssat	France	1:49.16	
