= 2004 IAAF World Indoor Championships – Men's 800 metres =

The Men's 800 metres event at the 2004 IAAF World Indoor Championships was held on March 5–7.

== Medalists ==
| Gold | Silver | Bronze |
|---|---|---|
| Mbulaeni Mulaudzi; South Africa | Rashid Ramzi; Bahrain | Osmar Barbosa dos Santos; Brazil |

== Results ==
=== Heat ===
First 2 of each heat (Q) and next 6 fastest (q) qualified for the semifinals.

| Rank | Heat | Name | Nationality | Time | Notes |
|---|---|---|---|---|---|
| 1 | 1 | Osmar Barbosa dos Santos | Brazil | 1:47.67 | Q |
| 2 | 5 | Jean-Patrick Nduwimana | Burundi | 1:47.71 | Q |
| 3 | 3 | Joseph Mwengi Mutua | Kenya | 1:47.86 | Q |
| 4 | 3 | Arnoud Okken | Netherlands | 1:47.88 | Q, SB |
| 5 | 6 | Florent Lacasse | France | 1:48.01 | Q |
| 6 | 3 | Amine Laalou | Morocco | 1:48.03 | q |
| 7 | 1 | Joeri Jansen | Belgium | 1:48.10 | Q |
| 8 | 4 | Rashid Ramzi | Bahrain | 1:48.25 | Q |
| 9 | 6 | Mouhssin Chehibi | Morocco | 1:48.44 | Q |
| 10 | 6 | William Yiampoy | Kenya | 1:48.49 | q |
| 11 | 4 | Bram Som | Netherlands | 1:48.55 | Q |
| 11 | 6 | Yusuf Saad Kamel | Bahrain | 1:48.55 | q |
| 13 | 1 | Michael Stember | United States | 1:48.66 | q |
| 14 | 1 | Juan de Dios Jurado | Spain | 1:48.70 | q, SB |
| 15 | 5 | Tom Omey | Belgium | 1:48.92 | Q |
| 16 | 2 | Antonio Manuel Reina | Spain | 1:49.72 | Q |
| 17 | 2 | Mbulaeni Mulaudzi | South Africa | 1:49.83 | Q |
| 18 | 4 | Fabiano Peçanha | Brazil | 1:49.98 | q, SB |
| 19 | 4 | David Fiegen | Luxembourg | 1:50.02 | |
| 20 | 3 | Derrick Peterson | United States | 1:50.05 | |
| 21 | 3 | Sajad Moradi | Iran | 1:50.06 | |
| 22 | 2 | Dmitriy Bogdanov | Russia | 1:50.21 | |
| 23 | 5 | Nicolas Aïssat | France | 1:50.65 | |
| 24 | 2 | Rizak Dirshe | Sweden | 1:50.89 | |
| 25 | 2 | Paskar Owor | Uganda | 1:51.41 | SB |
| 26 | 1 | Roman Hanzel | Slovakia | 1:51.54 | |
| 27 | 4 | Mohammad Al-Azemi | Kuwait | 1:51.80 | SB |
| 28 | 2 | Abubaker El Gatroni | Libya | 1:52.64 | |
| 29 | 6 | Avetik Arakelian | Armenia | 1:53.44 | SB |
| 30 | 5 | Abdal Salam Aldabaji | Palestine | 1:53.48 | NR |
| 31 | 1 | Kondwani Chiwina | Malawi | 1:54.49 | PB |
| 32 | 6 | Nazar Begliyev | Turkmenistan | 1:54.72 | SB |
| | 4 | Samwel Mwera | Tanzania | DQ | |
| | 5 | Berhanu Alemu | Ethiopia | DQ | |
| | 3 | Ismail Ahmed Ismail | Sudan | DNF | |
| | 5 | Gary Reed | Canada | DNF | |

=== Semifinals ===
First 2 of each semifinal (Q) qualified for the final.

| Rank | Heat | Name | Nationality | Time | Notes |
|---|---|---|---|---|---|
| 1 | 1 | Osmar Barbosa dos Santos | Brazil | 1:46.91 | Q |
| 2 | 1 | William Yiampoy | Kenya | 1:47.02 | Q |
| 3 | 2 | Joseph Mwengi Mutua | Kenya | 1:47.07 | Q |
| 4 | 1 | Yusuf Saad Kamel | Bahrain | 1:47.16 | AR |
| 5 | 2 | Rashid Ramzi | Bahrain | 1:47.28 | Q, PB |
| 6 | 2 | Florent Lacasse | France | 1:47.28 | |
| 7 | 1 | Antonio Manuel Reina | Spain | 1:47.33 | SB |
| 8 | 1 | Mouhssin Chehibi | Morocco | 1:47.45 | PB |
| 9 | 2 | Arnoud Okken | Netherlands | 1:47.84 | SB |
| 10 | 2 | Joeri Jansen | Belgium | 1:48.61 | |
| 11 | 1 | Michael Stember | United States | 1:48.68 | |
| 12 | 3 | Mbulaeni Mulaudzi | South Africa | 1:49.96 | Q |
| 13 | 3 | Amine Laalou | Morocco | 1:50.07 | Q |
| 14 | 3 | Juan de Dios Jurado | Spain | 1:50.99 | |
| 15 | 3 | Tom Omey | Belgium | 1:51.15 | |
| 16 | 2 | Fabiano Peçanha | Brazil | 1:51.59 | |
| 17 | 3 | Jean-Patrick Nduwimana | Burundi | 1:52.20 | |
| | 3 | Bram Som | Netherlands | DNF | |

=== Final ===
| Rank | Name | Nationality | Time | Notes |
|---|---|---|---|---|
| 1st place, gold medalist(s) | Mbulaeni Mulaudzi | South Africa | 1:45.71 | |
| 2nd place, silver medalist(s) | Rashid Ramzi | Bahrain | 1:46.15 | AR |
| 3rd place, bronze medalist(s) | Osmar Barbosa dos Santos | Brazil | 1:46.46 | |
| 4 | Amine Laalou | Morocco | 1:46.57 | PB |
| 5 | William Yiampoy | Kenya | 1:46.88 | |
| 6 | Joseph Mwengi Mutua | Kenya | 1:47.86 | |
