= 2003 World Championships in Athletics – Men's 800 metres =

These are the official results of the Men's 800 metres event at the 2003 IAAF World Championships in Paris, France. There were a total of 58 participating athletes, with eight qualifying heats, three semi-finals and the final held on Sunday 31 August 2003, at 17:30.

== Medalists ==
Gold	Djabir Saïd-Guerni; Algeria (ALG)
Silver	Yuriy Borzakovskiy; Russia (RUS)
Bronze	Mbulaeni Mulaudzi; South Africa (RSA)

== Final ==
RANK	FINAL	TIME
	Djabir Saïd-Guerni (ALG)	1:44.81
	Yuriy Borzakovskiy (RUS)	1:44.84
	Mbulaeni Mulaudzi (RSA)	1:44.90
4.	Wilson Kipketer (DEN)	1:45.23
5.	Andrea Longo (ITA)	1:45.43
6.	Justus Koech (KEN)	1:45.63
7.	Hezekiél Sepeng (RSA)	1:45.74
8.	Osmar dos Santos (BRA)	1:46.28

== Semi-final ==
- Held on Friday 29 August 2003

RANK	HEAT 1	TIME
1.	Yuriy Borzakovskiy (RUS)	1:45.31
2.	Wilson Kipketer (DEN)	1:45.50
3.	Justus Koech (KEN)	1:46.04
4.	Osmar dos Santos (BRA)	1:46.07
5.	Khalid Tighazouine (MAR)	1:46.83
6.	Mohammed Al-Salhi (KSA)	1:47.25
7.	João Pires (POR)	1:49.19
8.	Khadevis Robinson (USA)	1:50.60
—	Nicholas Wachira (KEN)	DNF

RANK	HEAT 2	TIME
1.	Mbulaeni Mulaudzi (RSA)	1:46.31
2.	Djabir Saïd-Guerni (ALG)	1:46.36
3.	Berhanu Alemu (ETH)	1:46.40
4.	Bram Som (NED)	1:46.63
5.	André Bucher (SUI)	1:46.67
6.	Florent Lacasse (FRA)	1:46.89
7.	Kris McCarthy (AUS)	1:47.64
8.	Ehsan Mohajer Shojaei (IRI)	1:47.71

RANK	HEAT 3	TIME
1.	Andrea Longo (ITA)	1:46.26
2.	Hezekiél Sepeng (RSA)	1:46.43
3.	Antonio Manuel Reina (ESP)	1:46.72
4.	Joeri Jansen (BEL)	1:46.78
5.	René Herms (GER)	1:46.88
6.	David Krummenacker (USA)	1:47.25
7.	Japheth Kimutai (KEN)	1:47.53
8.	Glody Dube (BOT)	1:48.69

== Heats ==
Held on Thursday 28 August 2003

RANK	HEAT 1	TIME
1.	Florent Lacasse (FRA)	1:47.21
2.	Justus Koech (KEN)	1:47.39
3.	Ricky Soos (GBR)	1:47.80
4.	Dmitriy Bogdanov (RUS)	1:48.36
5.	Jean-Patrick Nduwimana (BDI)	1:48.40
6.	Mindaugas Norbutas (LTU)	1:48.44
7.	Badwan Jaddoueh (SYR)	1:48.89

RANK	HEAT 2	TIME
1.	Berhanu Alemu (ETH)	1:45.63
2.	René Herms (GER)	1:45.71
3.	Osmar dos Santos (BRA)	1:45.72
4.	David Krummenacker (USA)	1:45.84
5.	Nicholas Wachira (KEN)	1:45.86
6.	João Pires (POR)	1:46.66
7.	Jimmy Anak Ahar (BRU)	1:57.86
8.	Dominic Carroll (GIB)	2:00.53

RANK	HEAT 3	TIME
1.	Mbulaeni Mulaudzi (RSA)	1:47.62
2.	Ehsan Mohajer Shojaei (IRI)	1:47.80
3.	Khadevis Robinson (USA)	1:47.85
4.	Achraf Tadili (CAN)	1:47.88
5.	Arnoud Okken (NED)	1:48.15
6.	Tom Omey (BEL)	1:48.93
—	Mouhssin Chehibi (MAR)	DQ

RANK	HEAT 4	TIME
1.	Japheth Kimutai (KEN)	1:47.54
2.	Kris McCarthy (AUS)	1:47.61
3.	Abdoulaye Wagne (SEN)	1:47.64
4.	Manuel Olmedo (ESP)	1:47.98
5.	Jasmin Salihović (BIH)	1:48.10
6.	Graham Davidson (RSA)	1:48.16
7.	Otukile Lekote (BOT)	1:48.33

RANK	HEAT 5	TIME
1.	Khalid Tighazouine (MAR)	1:46.01
2.	Bram Som (NED)	1:46.11
3.	Antonio Manuel Reina (ESP)	1:46.45
4.	Glody Dube (BOT)	1:46.68
5.	Arthémon Hatungimana (BDI)	1:47.74
—	Samuel Burley (USA)	DQ
—	Fred Thegu (SOL)	DQ

RANK	HEAT 6	TIME
1.	André Bucher (SUI)	1:48.61
2.	Wilson Kipketer (DEN)	1:48.68
3.	Gary Reed (CAN)	1:48.69
4.	Adam Abdu Adam Ali (QAT)	1:48.87
5.	Wilson Kirwa (FIN)	1:49.74
6.	Abdal Salam Aldabaji (PLE)	1:51.68
7.	Mohamed Amir (MDV)	2:06.25
—	Ivan Heshko (UKR)	DNS

RANK	HEAT 7	TIME
1.	Andrea Longo (ITA)	1:46.26
2.	Yuriy Borzakovskiy (RUS)	1:46.44
3.	Joeri Jansen (BEL)	1:46.68
4.	Amine Laalou (MAR)	1:46.75
5.	Rashid Mohamed (BHR)	1:47.43
6.	Jimmy Lomba (FRA)	1:48.15
7.	David Fiegen (LUX)	1:48.80

RANK	HEAT 8	TIME
1.	Djabir Saïd-Guerni (ALG)	1:46.06
2.	Hezekiél Sepeng (RSA)	1:46.09
3.	Mohammed Al-Salhi (KSA)	1:46.48
4.	Ismail Ahmed Ismail (SUD)	1:47.21
5.	Rizak Dirshe (SWE)	1:49.23
6.	Mahamadou Ibrahim (NIG)	1:55.21
—	Nicolas Aïssat (FRA)	DNF

== See also ==
- Athletics at the 2003 Pan American Games - Men's 800 metres
