= 2001 European Athletics U23 Championships – Men's 800 metres =

The men's 800 metres event at the 2001 European Athletics U23 Championships was held in Amsterdam, Netherlands, at Olympisch Stadion on 14 and 15 July.

== Medalists ==
Gold	Antonio Manuel Reina; Spain
Silver	Joeri Jansen; Belgium
Bronze	Nicolas Aïssat; France

== Results ==
=== Final ===
15 July

Rank	Name	Nationality	Time	Notes
1st place, gold medalist(s)	Antonio Manuel Reina	Spain	1:47.74	
2nd place, silver medalist(s)	Joeri Jansen	Belgium	1:47.80	
3rd place, bronze medalist(s)	Nicolas Aïssat	France	1:47.81	
4	Simon Lees	United Kingdom	1:47.82	
5	Bram Som	Netherlands	1:47.84	
6	Christian Köhler	Germany	1:48.91	
7	Fernando Almeida	Portugal	1:50.14	
8	Romain De Bock	France	1:53.54	

=== Heats ===
14 July
Qualified: first 2 in each heat and 2 best to the Final

==== Heat 1 ====
Rank	Name	Nationality	Time	Notes
1	Bram Som	Netherlands	1:48.86	Q
2	Simon Lees	United Kingdom	1:49.28	Q
3	Richard Peel	Sweden	1:49.43	
4	Thomas Planque	France	1:49.90	
5	Stanislav Tábor	Czech Republic	1:49.97	
6	Juan de Dios Jurado	Spain	1:50.59	
7	Sebastian Resch	Austria	1:51.74	

==== Heat 2 ====
Rank	Name	Nationality	Time	Notes
1	Antonio Manuel Reina	Spain	1:48.76	Q
2	Nicolas Aïssat	France	1:48.85	Q
3	João Pires	Portugal	1:48.92	
4	Dmitriy Bogdanov	Russia	1:49.18	
5	Stefen Beumer	Netherlands	1:49.44	
6	Chris Moss	United Kingdom	1:49.71	

==== Heat 3 ====
Rank	Name	Nationality	Time	Notes
1	Joeri Jansen	Belgium	1:48.14	Q
2	Christian Köhler	Germany	1:48.16	Q
3	Romain De Bock	France	1:48.46	q
4	Fernando Almeida	Portugal	1:48.71	q
5	Miguel Quesada	Spain	1:49.37	
6	Mihai Borz	Romania	1:51.16	
7	Jasmin Salihović	Bosnia and Herzegovina	1:52.03	

== Participation ==
According to an unofficial count, 20 athletes from 13 countries participated in the event.

- Austria (1)
- Belgium (1)
- Bosnia and Herzegovina (1)
- Czech Republic (1)
- France (3)
- Germany (1)
- Netherlands (2)
- Portugal (2)
- Romania (1)
- Russia (1)
- Spain (3)
- Sweden (1)
- United Kingdom (2)
