= 1998 World Junior Championships in Athletics – Men's 800 metres =

Men's 800 metres event at 1998 Olympics

The men's 800 metres event at the 1998 World Junior Championships in Athletics was held in Annecy, France, at Parc des Sports on 28, 29 and 31 July.

== Medalists ==
Gold	William Chirchir; Kenya
Silver	Wilfred Bungei; Kenya
Bronze	Paskar Owor; Uganda

== Results ==
=== Final ===
31 July

Rank	Name	Nationality	Time	Notes
1st place, gold medalist(s)	William Chirchir	Kenya	1:47.23	
2nd place, silver medalist(s)	Wilfred Bungei	Kenya	1:47.53	
3rd place, bronze medalist(s)	Paskar Owor	Uganda	1:48.20	
4	João Pires	Portugal	1:48.22	
5	Bram Som	Netherlands	1:48.36	
6	Chris Moss	United Kingdom	1:48.77	
7	Dmitriy Bogdanov	Russia	1:48.91	
8	Dwayne Miller	Jamaica	1:49.25	

=== Semifinals ===
29 July

==== Semifinal 1 ====
Rank	Name	Nationality	Time	Notes
1	Chris Moss	United Kingdom	1:50.65	Q
2	Wilfred Bungei	Kenya	1:50.70	Q
3	Dwayne Miller	Jamaica	1:50.76	Q
4	Lucky Hadebe	South Africa	1:51.01	
5	Nicolas Aïssat	France	1:51.11	
6	Ramon Wächter	Switzerland	1:51.11	
7	Mechal Gebreab	Ethiopia	1:51.19	
8	Rachid Khouia	Morocco	1:51.49	

==== Semifinal 2 ====
Rank	Name	Nationality	Time	Notes
1	William Chirchir	Kenya	1:48.93	Q
2	João Pires	Portugal	1:49.05	Q
3	Paskar Owor	Uganda	1:49.25	Q
4	Dmitriy Bogdanov	Russia	1:49.31	q
5	Bram Som	Netherlands	1:49.80	q
6	Joeri Jansen	Belgium	1:53.46	
7	Mohamed Al-Bayed	Palestine	1:54.51	
	Glauco Santos	Brazil	DNS	

=== Heats ===
28 July

==== Heat 1 ====
Rank	Name	Nationality	Time	Notes
1	Wilfred Bungei	Kenya	1:49.47	Q
2	Dwayne Miller	Jamaica	1:49.59	Q
3	Glauco Santos	Brazil	1:50.41	q
4	Kiyoharo Sato	Japan	1:50.58	
5	John Chávez	Colombia	1:51.23	
6	Said Chabane	Algeria	1:56.89	
7	Safari Rwakabera	Rwanda	2:01.29	

==== Heat 2 ====
Rank	Name	Nationality	Time	Notes
1	João Pires	Portugal	1:50.73	Q
2	Mohamed Al-Bayed	Palestine	1:51.18	Q
3	Sergio Gallardo	Spain	1:51.32	
4	Marlon Greensword	Jamaica	1:51.60	
5	Youcef Djebbab	Algeria	1:51.94	
6	Jon Stevens	United States	1:52.19	
7	Shawn Jeffers	British Virgin Islands	1:55.98	
8	Casper Pule	Solomon Islands	2:00.43	

==== Heat 3 ====
Rank	Name	Nationality	Time	Notes
1	Chris Moss	United Kingdom	1:49.92	Q
2	Mechal Gebreab	Ethiopia	1:50.28	Q
3	Nicolas Aïssat	France	1:50.30	q
4	Alberto Revilla	Spain	1:50.75	
5	Craig Wood	Australia	1:50.91	
6	Kim Myung-Hwan	South Korea	1:54.38	
7	Baiju Mirandi	India	1:56.41	
8	Gerard Solomon	Vanuatu	1:56.79	

==== Heat 4 ====
Rank	Name	Nationality	Time	Notes
1	Paskar Owor	Uganda	1:51.99	Q
2	Bram Som	Netherlands	1:52.15	Q
3	Jasmin Salihović	Bosnia and Herzegovina	1:52.28	
4	Nick Lorenz	Australia	1:53.27	
5	Jon Andersson	Sweden	1:54.80	
6	Claudinel Vitor	Brazil	1:56.68	
7	Clive Baron	Dominica	1:57.03	
8	Florent Battistel	Monaco	2:00.31	

==== Heat 5 ====
Rank	Name	Nationality	Time	Notes
1	Dmitriy Bogdanov	Russia	1:52.64	Q
2	Lucky Hadebe	South Africa	1:52.97	Q
3	Park Ho-Min	South Korea	1:53.14	
4	Igor Khalavniov	Belarus	1:53.16	
5	Mark Hassell	United States	1:53.16	
6	Abdelkabir Louraïbi	Morocco	1:53.25	
7	Florent Lacasse	France	1:54.42	
8	Tobias Ganzmann	Germany	1:55.99	

==== Heat 6 ====
Rank	Name	Nationality	Time	Notes
1	Joeri Jansen	Belgium	1:50.84	Q
2	Rachid Khouia	Morocco	1:51.91	Q
3	Dario Sbrana	Italy	1:52.01	
4	Jan Drees	Germany	1:52.20	
5	Ivan Heshko	Ukraine	1:53.10	
6	Simon Lees	United Kingdom	1:53.79	
7	Farid Salvaterra	São Tomé and Príncipe	1:58.09	
8	Kamardin Andriantambezina	Madagascar	2:00.09	

==== Heat 7 ====
Rank	Name	Nationality	Time	Notes
1	William Chirchir	Kenya	1:51.78	Q
2	Ramon Wächter	Switzerland	1:51.89	Q
3	Geert Waelput	Belgium	1:52.29	
4	Mandla Nkosi	South Africa	1:54.08	
5	Francesco Roncalli	Italy	1:55.89	
6	Hamed Ahmed Mohamed	Sudan	1:56.38	
7	Rickard Pell	Sweden	1:58.12	

== Participation ==
According to an unofficial count, 54 athletes from 38 countries participated in the event.

- Algeria (2)
- Australia (2)
- Belarus (1)
- Belgium (2)
- Bosnia and Herzegovina (1)
- Brazil (2)
- British Virgin Islands (1)
- Colombia (1)
- Dominica (1)
- Ethiopia (1)
- France (2)
- Germany (2)
- India (1)
- Italy (2)
- Jamaica (2)
- Japan (1)
- Kenya (2)
- Madagascar (1)
- Monaco (1)
- Morocco (2)
- Netherlands (1)
- Palestine (1)
- Portugal (1)
- Russia (1)
- Rwanda (1)
- São Tomé and Príncipe (1)
- Solomon Islands (1)
- South Africa (2)
- South Korea (2)
- Spain (2)
- Sudan (1)
- Sweden (2)
- Switzerland (1)
- Uganda (1)
- Ukraine (1)
- United Kingdom (2)
- United States (2)
- Vanuatu (1)
