= 2005 European Athletics Indoor Championships – Men's 800 metres =

The Men's 800 metres event at the 2005 European Athletics Indoor Championships was held on March 4–5.

== Medalists ==
Gold	Silver	Bronze
Dmitriy Bogdanov; Russia	Antonio Manuel Reina; Spain	Juan de Dios Jurado; Spain

== Results ==
=== Heats ===
The winner of each heat (Q) and the next 3 fastest (q) qualified for the final.

Rank	Heat	Name	Nationality	Time	Notes
1	1	Antonio Manuel Reina	Spain	1:47.70	Q
2	1	James McIlroy	Great Britain	1:47.97	q
3	3	Dmitriy Bogdanov	Russia	1:48.02	Q
4	2	Juan de Dios Jurado	Spain	1:48.29	Q
5	1	Antoine Martiak	France	1:48.32	q, PB
6	2	Arnoud Okken	Netherlands	1:48.54	q
7	2	Mattias Claesson	Sweden	1:48.62	PB
8	3	Eugenio Barrios	Spain	1:48.80	
9	3	Grzegorz Krzosek	Poland	1:48.96	
10	2	Nicolas Aïssat	France	1:49.12	
11	3	Jimmy Watkins	Great Britain	1:49.30	
12	1	Domen Žnidarič	Slovenia	1:50.03	
13	2	Jozef Pelikán	Slovakia	1:51.09	
14	1	Dmitrijs Miļkevičs	Latvia	1:51.61	
15	3	Fernando Almeida	Portugal	1:51.77	
16	1	Florian Hilti	Liechtenstein	1:54.94	

=== Final ===
Rank	Name	Nationality	Time	Notes
1st place, gold medalist(s)	Dmitriy Bogdanov	Russia	1:48.61	
2nd place, silver medalist(s)	Antonio Manuel Reina	Spain	1:48.76	
3rd place, bronze medalist(s)	Juan de Dios Jurado	Spain	1:49.11	
4	James McIlroy	Great Britain	1:49.33	
5	Arnoud Okken	Netherlands	1:49.77	
6	Antoine Martiak	France	1:51.11	
