= 2006 European Athletics Championships – Men's 800 metres =

Men's 800 metres at the European Athletics Championships
- Location: Ullevi
- Dates: August 13
- Competitors: 28
- Winning time: 1:46.56

Medalists
gold medal	Bram Som	Netherlands
silver medal	David Fiegen	Luxembourg
bronze medal	Sam Ellis	Great Britain

The men's 800 metres at the 2006 European Athletics Championships were held at the Ullevi on August 10, 11 and August 13.

Originally, the Latvian delegation, representing Dmitrijs Milkevics (4th), issued a complaint because Bram Som stepped out of the track twice. Som and Ellis both also complained that Milkevics had blocked their way and pushed them. However, after long considerations by the jury, the result stood.

The winning margin was 0.03 seconds which with the conclusion of the 2024 championships remains the narrowest winning margin in the men's 800 metres at these championships since the introduction of fully automatic timing.

== Medalists ==
Gold	Silver	Bronze
Bram Som; Netherlands	David Fiegen; Luxembourg	Sam Ellis; United Kingdom

== Schedule ==
Date	Time	Round
August 10, 2006	11:55	Round 1
August 11, 2006	19:05	Semifinals
August 13, 2006	15:10	Final

== Results ==
KEY:	q	Fastest non-qualifiers	Q	Qualified	NR	National record	PB	Personal best	SB	Seasonal best

=== Round 1 ===
Qualification: First 3 in each heat (Q) and the next 4 fastest (q) advance to the semifinals.

Rank	Heat	Name	Nationality	Time	Notes
1	2	Michael Rimmer	United Kingdom	1:47.10	Q
2	1	Florent Lacasse	France	1:47.22	Q
3	2	Bram Som	Netherlands	1:47.26	Q
4	2	Mirosław Formela	Poland	1:47.39	Q
5	2	Andrea Longo	Italy	1:47.40	q
6	1	David Fiegen	Luxembourg	1:47.41	Q
7	2	Ramil Aritkulov	Russia	1:47.69	q
8	1	Miguel Quesada	Spain	1:47.70	Q
9	1	Sam Ellis	United Kingdom	1:47.72	q
10	1	Mattias Claesson	Sweden	1:47.82	q
11	3	Dmitrijs Miļkevičs	Latvia	1:47.84	Q
12	3	Juan de Dios Jurado	Spain	1:47.89	Q
13	3	Grzegorz Krzosek	Poland	1:48.08	Q
14	3	Maurizio Bobbato	Italy	1:48.21	
15	3	Ivan Nesterov	Russia	1:48.22	
16	3	René Herms	Germany	1:48.67	
17	2	Dave Campbell	Ireland	1:48.70	
18	1	Selahattin Çobanoğlu	Turkey	1:49.07	SB
19	1	Efthimios Papadopoulos	Greece	1:49.36	
20	4	Manuel Olmedo	Spain	1:49.54	Q
21	4	Josef Repcík	Slovakia	1:49.63	Q
22	4	Thomas Matthys	Belgium	1:49.76	Q
23	4	Dmitriy Bogdanov	Russia	1:49.85	
24	2	Björn Margeirsson	Iceland	1:49.91	PB
25	4	Thomas Chamney	Ireland	1:50.12	
26	4	Richard Hill	United Kingdom	1:50.26	
27	4	Lee Taylor	Gibraltar	1:56.06	
	3	Mehdi Baala	France		DNS

=== Semifinals ===
First 3 in each heat (Q) and the next 2 fastest (q) advance to the Final.

Rank	Heat	Name	Nationality	Time	Notes
1	2	Miguel Quesada	Spain	1:47.12	Q
2	2	Andrea Longo	Italy	1:47.20	Q
3	2	Dmitrijs Miļkevičs	Latvia	1:47.35	Q
4	2	David Fiegen	Luxembourg	1:47.50	q
5	2	Michael Rimmer	United Kingdom	1:47.82	q
6	2	Grzegorz Krzosek	Poland	1:48.11	
7	2	Mattias Claesson	Sweden	1:48.27	
8	2	Ramil Aritkulov	Russia	1:48.42	
9	1	Florent Lacasse	France	1:49.12	Q
10	1	Bram Som	Netherlands	1:49.15	Q
11	1	Sam Ellis	United Kingdom	1:49.23	Q
12	1	Manuel Olmedo	Spain	1:49.37	
13	1	Thomas Matthys	Belgium	1:49.65	
14	1	Mirosław Formela	Poland	1:49.70	
15	1	Juan de Dios Jurado	Spain	1:50.11	
16	1	Josef Repcík	Slovakia	1:50.89	

=== Final ===
Rank	Name	Nationality	Time	Notes
1st place, gold medalist(s)	Bram Som	Netherlands	1:46.56	
2nd place, silver medalist(s)	David Fiegen	Luxembourg	1:46.59	
3rd place, bronze medalist(s)	Sam Ellis	United Kingdom	1:46.64	
4	Dmitrijs Miļkevičs	Latvia	1:46.70	
5	Miguel Quesada	Spain	1:46.91	
6	Florent Lacasse	France	1:46.95	
7	Andrea Longo	Italy	1:47.11	
8	Michael Rimmer	United Kingdom	1:47.66	
