= 2002 European Athletics Indoor Championships – Men's 800 metres =

The men's 800 metres event at the 2002 European Athletics Indoor Championships was held on March 1–3.

== Medalists ==
| Gold | Silver | Bronze |
|---|---|---|
| Paweł Czapiewski; Poland | André Bucher; Switzerland | Antonio Manuel Reina; Spain |

== Results ==
=== Heats ===
First 2 of each heat (Q) and the next 4 fastest (q) qualified for the semifinals.

| Rank | Heat | Name | Nationality | Time | Notes |
|---|---|---|---|---|---|
| 1 | 3 | Antonio Manuel Reina | Spain | 1:47.19 | Q |
| 2 | 3 | Sergey Kozhevnikov | Russia | 1:47.63 | Q, SB |
| 3 | 3 | Tom Omey | Belgium | 1:47.78 | q, SB |
| 4 | 3 | Nicolas Aïssat | France | 1:47.85 | q |
| 5 | 3 | Christian Neunhauserer | Italy | 1:48.30 | q |
| 6 | 2 | André Bucher | Switzerland | 1:48.62 | Q |
| 7 | 2 | Roman Oravec | Czech Republic | 1:48.70 | Q |
| 8 | 4 | Paweł Czapiewski | Poland | 1:48.82 | Q |
| 9 | 2 | Fernando Almeida | Portugal | 1:48.83 | q |
| 10 | 4 | Dmitriy Bogdanov | Russia | 1:49.07 | Q |
| 11 | 4 | Bram Som | Netherlands | 1:49.08 | |
| 12 | 2 | Arnoud Okken | Netherlands | 1:49.12 | |
| 13 | 2 | Livio Sciandra | Italy | 1:49.57 | |
| 13 | 4 | Miguel Quesada | Spain | 1:49.57 | |
| 15 | 4 | João Pires | Portugal | 1:49.72 | |
| 16 | 1 | Florent Lacasse | France | 1:51.45 | Q |
| 17 | 1 | David Fiegen | Luxembourg | 1:51.56 | Q |
| 18 | 1 | Massimo De Meo | Italy | 1:51.82 | |
| 19 | 1 | Manuel Olmedo | Spain | 1:51.95 | |
| 20 | 1 | Jasmin Salihović | Bosnia and Herzegovina | 1:52.56 | |
| 21 | 1 | Roman Hanzel | Slovakia | 1:52.56 | |
| | 3 | Pavel Pelyapyashin | Belarus | DNF | |

=== Semifinals ===
First 3 of each semifinal qualified directly (Q) for the final.

| Rank | Heat | Name | Nationality | Time | Notes |
|---|---|---|---|---|---|
| 1 | 1 | André Bucher | Switzerland | 1:47.10 | Q |
| 2 | 1 | Sergey Kozhevnikov | Russia | 1:47.77 | Q |
| 3 | 1 | David Fiegen | Luxembourg | 1:47.81 | Q, NR |
| 4 | 1 | Florent Lacasse | France | 1:48.12 | |
| 5 | 1 | Roman Oravec | Czech Republic | 1:48.25 | SB |
| 6 | 1 | Tom Omey | Belgium | 1:48.75 | |
| 7 | 2 | Paweł Czapiewski | Poland | 1:50.04 | Q |
| 8 | 2 | Antonio Manuel Reina | Spain | 1:50.28 | Q |
| 9 | 2 | Dmitriy Bogdanov | Russia | 1:50.44 | Q |
| 10 | 2 | Nicolas Aïssat | France | 1:50.80 | |
| 11 | 2 | Christian Neunhauserer | Italy | 1:50.82 | |
| 12 | 2 | Fernando Almeida | Portugal | 1:51.96 | |

=== Final ===
| Rank | Name | Nationality | Time | Notes |
|---|---|---|---|---|
| 1st place, gold medalist(s) | Paweł Czapiewski | Poland | 1:44.78 | CR, NR |
| 2nd place, silver medalist(s) | André Bucher | Switzerland | 1:44.93 | NR |
| 3rd place, bronze medalist(s) | Antonio Manuel Reina | Spain | 1:45.25 | NR |
| 4 | Dmitriy Bogdanov | Russia | 1:45.84 | PB |
| 5 | Sergey Kozhevnikov | Russia | 1:46.13 | PB |
| 6 | David Fiegen | Luxembourg | 1:47.44 | NR |
