= 2000 World Junior Championships in Athletics – Men's 800 metres =

The men's 800 metres event at the 2000 World Junior Championships in Athletics was held in Santiago, Chile, at Estadio Nacional Julio Martínez Prádanos on 17, 18 and 20 October.

== Medalists ==
Gold	Nicholas Wachira; Kenya
Silver	Florent Lacasse; France
Bronze	Antonio Manuel Reina; Spain

== Results ==
=== Final ===
20 October

Rank	Name	Nationality	Time	Notes
1st place, gold medalist(s)	Nicholas Wachira	Kenya	1:47.16	
2nd place, silver medalist(s)	Florent Lacasse	France	1:47.61	
3rd place, bronze medalist(s)	Antonio Manuel Reina	Spain	1:47.90	
4	Salem Amer Al-Badri	Qatar	1:48.51	
5	Arnoud Okken	Netherlands	1:49.10	
6	Abdelkabir Louraïbi	Morocco	1:49.88	
7	Jason Stewart	New Zealand	1:50.34	
8	Aldwyn Sappleton	Jamaica	1:50.63	
9	Abdul Rahman Suleiman	Qatar	1:50.92	

=== Semifinals ===
18 October

==== Semifinal 1 ====
Rank	Name	Nationality	Time	Notes
1	Florent Lacasse	France	1:48.13	Q
2	Nicholas Wachira	Kenya	1:48.30	Q
3	Salem Amer Al-Badri	Qatar	1:48.44	Q
4	Mohamed Osman	Saudi Arabia	1:51.19	
5	Aldwyn Sappleton	Jamaica	1:52.56	q
6	Jako Burgers	South Africa	1:53.40	
7	Fernando Almeida	Portugal	1:54.52	
8	Amine Laâlou	Morocco	3:00.54	

==== Semifinal 2 ====
Rank	Name	Nationality	Time	Notes
1	Antonio Manuel Reina	Spain	1:49.06	Q
2	Arnoud Okken	Netherlands	1:49.42	Q
3	Abdelkabir Louraïbi	Morocco	1:49.80	Q
4	Abdul Rahman Suleiman	Qatar	1:50.14	q
5	Jason Stewart	New Zealand	1:50.27	q
6	Vincent Kemboi	Kenya	1:50.29	
7	Nick Devenport	United States	1:52.81	
8	Tom Vanchaze	Belgium	1:54.65	

=== Heats ===
17 October

==== Heat 1 ====
Rank	Name	Nationality	Time	Notes
1	Florent Lacasse	France	1:51.05	Q
2	Abdul Rahman Suleiman	Qatar	1:51.39	Q
3	Vincent Kemboi	Kenya	1:51.43	Q
4	Amine Laâlou	Morocco	1:51.55	q
5	Manuel Olmedo	Spain	1:51.65	
6	Hamza Abdenouz	Algeria	1:51.69	
7	Primesh Kumar	India	1:56.80	
8	Setefano Mika	Samoa	2:02.72	

==== Heat 2 ====
Rank	Name	Nationality	Time	Notes
1	Arnoud Okken	Netherlands	1:49.81	Q
2	Tom Vanchaze	Belgium	1:50.15	Q
3	Aldwyn Sappleton	Jamaica	1:50.36	Q
4	Abdelkabir Louraïbi	Morocco	1:50.80	q
5	Jako Burgers	South Africa	1:51.43	q
6	Dominik Erhardt	Germany	1:51.95	
7	Ismail Ahmed Ismail	Sudan	1:53.14	
8	Ebrima Ceesay	Gambia	1:57.98	

==== Heat 3 ====
Rank	Name	Nationality	Time	Notes
1	Nicholas Wachira	Kenya	1:50.91	Q
2	Salem Amer Al-Badri	Qatar	1:51.13	Q
3	Fernando Almeida	Portugal	1:52.21	Q
4	Mandla Nkosi	South Africa	1:56.01	
5	Raymond Adams	United Kingdom	1:56.93	
6	Banzragch Batmunkh	Mongolia	1:59.68	

==== Heat 4 ====
Rank	Name	Nationality	Time	Notes
1	Antonio Manuel Reina	Spain	1:50.84	Q
2	Nick Devenport	United States	1:51.15	Q
3	Mohamed Osman	Saudi Arabia	1:51.45	Q
4	Jason Stewart	New Zealand	1:51.57	q
5	Anthony Lilley	Ireland	1:52.48	
6	Moussa Aoudjali	Chad	2:00.73	
7	Florent Battistel	Monaco	2:04.40	

== Participation ==
According to an unofficial count, 29 athletes from 24 countries participated in the event.

- Algeria (1)
- Belgium (1)
- Chad (1)
- France (1)
- Gambia (1)
- Germany (1)
- India (1)
- Ireland (1)
- Jamaica (1)
- Kenya (2)
- Monaco (1)
- Mongolia (1)
- Morocco (2)
- Netherlands (1)
- New Zealand (1)
- Portugal (1)
- Qatar (2)
- Samoa (1)
- Saudi Arabia (1)
- South Africa (2)
- Spain (2)
- Sudan (1)
- United Kingdom (1)
- United States (1)
