= 2001 IAAF World Indoor Championships – Men's 800 metres =

The men's 800 metres event at the 2001 IAAF World Indoor Championships was held on March 9–11.

== Medalists ==
Gold	Silver	Bronze
Yuriy Borzakovskiy; Russia	Johan Botha; South Africa	André Bucher; Switzerland

== Results ==
=== Heats ===
First 2 of each heat (Q) and the next 2 fastest (q) qualified for the semifinals.

Rank	Heat	Name	Nationality	Time	Notes
1	1	Yuriy Borzakovskiy	Russia	1:47.28	Q
2	1	Trinity Gray	United States	1:47.59	Q
3	5	Paweł Czapiewski	Poland	1:47.75	Q, PB
4	5	Florent Lacasse	France	1:47.82	Q
5	1	Daniel Caulfield	Ireland	1:47.83	q
6	5	André Bucher	Switzerland	1:47.88	q
7	5	Sergey Kozhevnikov	Russia	1:48.74	
8	1	Mark Rodgers	New Zealand	1:49.25	NR
9	3	Bram Som	Netherlands	1:49.77	Q
10	3	Johan Botha	South Africa	1:49.84	Q
11	4	Tom Omey	Belgium	1:49.85	Q
12	4	Roberto Parra	Spain	1:50.12	Q
13	4	João Pires	Portugal	1:50.13	
14	2	David Lelei	Kenya	1:50.53	Q
15	5	Mahmoud Al-Kheirat	Syria	1:50.71	NR
16	2	Glody Dube	Botswana	1:50.73	Q
16	4	Benjamin Kipkurui	Kenya	1:50.73	
18	3	Lukáš Vydra	Czech Republic	1:50.99	
19	2	Elliott Gaskins	United States	1:51.04	
20	2	Abdirizak Dirshe	Sweden	1:51.28	
21	3	Milton Browne	Barbados	1:51.60	
22	2	Crispen Mutakanyi	Zimbabwe	1:52.94	
23	4	Constantinos Hadjimarcou	Cyprus	1:53.10	
24	4	John Lozada	Philippines	1:54.10	
25	2	Amilcar Leal	Mozambique	1:55.19	
26	3	Mohammed Albayed	Palestine	2:03.06	
	1	Jean-Patrick Nduwimana	Burundi	DNS	
	3	Arthémon Hatungimana	Burundi	DNS	

=== Semifinals ===
First 3 of each semifinal (Q) qualified directly for the final.

Rank	Heat	Name	Nationality	Time	Notes
1	1	Yuriy Borzakovskiy	Russia	1:46.84	Q
2	2	André Bucher	Switzerland	1:47.04	Q
3	1	Johan Botha	South Africa	1:47.28	Q
4	2	Glody Dube	Botswana	1:47.31	Q, NR
5	1	Paweł Czapiewski	Poland	1:47.35	Q, PB
6	2	David Lelei	Kenya	1:47.48	Q
7	2	Tom Omey	Belgium	1:47.67	NR
8	2	Daniel Caulfield	Ireland	1:47.79	
9	1	Florent Lacasse	France	1:47.90	
10	1	Trinity Gray	United States	1:47.90	
11	2	Bram Som	Netherlands	1:49.34	
12	1	Roberto Parra	Spain	1:49.67	

=== Final ===
Rank	Name	Nationality	Time	Notes
1st place, gold medalist(s)	Yuriy Borzakovskiy	Russia	1:44.49	
2nd place, silver medalist(s)	Johan Botha	South Africa	1:46.42	
3rd place, bronze medalist(s)	André Bucher	Switzerland	1:46.46	
4	David Lelei	Kenya	1:46.88	
5	Glody Dube	Botswana	1:46.90	NR
6	Paweł Czapiewski	Poland	1:50.51	
