= 2007 European Athletics Indoor Championships – Men's 800 metres =

The Men's 800 metres event at the 2007 European Athletics Indoor Championships was held on March 2–4.

== Medalists ==
Gold	Silver	Bronze
Arnoud Okken; Netherlands	Miguel Quesada; Spain	Maurizio Bobbato; Italy

== Results ==
=== Heats ===
First 2 of each heat (Q) and the next 4 fastest (q) qualified for the semifinals.

Rank	Heat	Name	Nationality	Time	Notes
1	3	Arnoud Okken	Netherlands	1:49.15	Q
2	3	Luis Alberto Marco	Spain	1:49.28	Q
3	3	David McCarthy	Ireland	1:49.60	q
4	4	Mattias Claesson	Sweden	1:50.08	Q
5	4	Dávid Takács	Hungary	1:50.15	Q
6	4	Maurizio Bobbato	Italy	1:50.35	q
7	2	James Brewer	Great Britain	1:50.40	Q
8	3	Richard Hill	Great Britain	1:50.46	q
9	4	Jozef Pelikán	Slovakia	1:50.87	q
10	2	Catalin Mihu	Romania	1:51.41	Q
11	3	Ivan Nesterov	Russia	1:51.45	
12	2	Manuel Olmedo	Spain	1:54.54	
13	1	Miguel Quesada	Spain	1:55.43	Q
14	1	Thomas Chamney	Ireland	1:55.58	Q
15	1	Josef Repcík	Slovakia	1:56.04	
16	1	Andreas Rapatz	Austria	1:56.51	
17	1	Florian Hilti	Liechtenstein	2:00.16	
18	1	Lee Taylor	Gibraltar	2:03.83	
	2	Florent Lacasse	France	DQ	
	2	Yuriy Koldin	Russia	DQ	
	4	Selahattin Çobanoglu	Turkey	DQ	

=== Semifinals ===
First 3 of each semifinals qualified directly (Q) for the final.

Rank	Heat	Name	Nationality	Time	Notes
1	1	Miguel Quesada	Spain	1:48.62	Q
2	1	Mattias Claesson	Sweden	1:49.06	Q
3	1	Maurizio Bobbato	Italy	1:49.06	Q
4	1	David McCarthy	Ireland	1:49.37	PB
5	1	Richard Hill	Great Britain	1:49.43	
6	2	Arnoud Okken	Netherlands	1:49.65	Q
7	2	Luis Alberto Marco	Spain	1:50.12	Q
8	1	Jozef Pelikán	Slovakia	1:50.12	
9	2	Dávid Takács	Hungary	1:50.31	Q
10	2	James Brewer	Great Britain	1:50.40	
11	2	Thomas Chamney	Ireland	1:50.48	
12	2	Catalin Mihu	Romania	1:50.97	

=== Final ===
Rank	Name	Nationality	Time	Notes
1st place, gold medalist(s)	Arnoud Okken	Netherlands	1:47.92	
2nd place, silver medalist(s)	Miguel Quesada	Spain	1:47.96	
3rd place, bronze medalist(s)	Maurizio Bobbato	Italy	1:48.71	PB
4	Luis Alberto Marco	Spain	1:48.71	
5	Mattias Claesson	Sweden	1:48.72	
6	Dávid Takács	Hungary	1:49.28	
