= 2003 IAAF World Indoor Championships – Men's 800 metres =

The men's 800 metres event at the 2003 IAAF World Indoor Championships was held on March 14–16.

== Medalists ==
Gold	Silver	Bronze
David Krummenacker; United States	Wilson Kipketer; Denmark	Wilfred Bungei; Kenya

== Results ==
=== Heats ===
First 2 of each heat (Q) and next 4 fastest (q) qualified for the semifinals.

Rank	Heat	Name	Nationality	Time	Notes
1	4	Wilfred Bungei	Kenya	1:48.17	Q
2	2	Joseph Mwengi Mutua	Kenya	1:48.26	Q
3	2	Bram Som	Netherlands	1:48.40	Q
4	1	Wilson Kipketer	Denmark	1:48.47	Q
5	4	Glody Dube	Botswana	1:48.48	Q
6	1	David Krummenacker	United States	1:48.66	Q
6	4	Nicolas Aïssat	France	1:48.66	q
8	1	Arnoud Okken	Netherlands	1:48.96	q
9	2	Osmar Barbosa dos Santos	Brazil	1:49.01	q
10	4	Sergey Kozhevnikov	Russia	1:49.25	q
11	3	Antonio Manuel Reina	Spain	1:49.38	Q
12	4	Khadevis Robinson	United States	1:49.44	SB
13	2	Christian Neunhauserer	Italy	1:49.54	
14	3	Roman Oravec	Czech Republic	1:49.66	Q
15	1	Chris Moss	Great Britain	1:50.21	
16	3	Mohammad Al-Azemi	Kuwait	1:50.41	NR
17	2	Juan de Dios Jurado	Spain	1:50.47	
18	3	João Pires	Portugal	1:50.76	
19	1	Alexandre Padovani	France	1:51.30	
20	3	Fadrique Iglesias	Bolivia	1:52.93	
21	2	Rashid Habib	Bahrain	1:52.99	
22	1	Nazar Begliyev	Turkmenistan	1:54.07	
23	4	Mahmoud Abuattaya	Palestine	1:59.24	NR
	3	Hezekiél Sepeng	South Africa	DQ	

=== Semifinals ===
First 3 of each semifinal (Q) qualified directly for the final.

Rank	Heat	Name	Nationality	Time	Notes
1	1	Wilfred Bungei	Kenya	1:47.04	Q
2	1	David Krummenacker	United States	1:47.30	Q
3	1	Bram Som	Netherlands	1:47.57	Q
4	1	Glody Dube	Botswana	1:47.63	
5	2	Wilson Kipketer	Denmark	1:47.84	Q
6	2	Arnoud Okken	Netherlands	1:48.26	Q
7	2	Antonio Manuel Reina	Spain	1:48.27	Q
8	2	Joseph Mwengi Mutua	Kenya	1:48.46	
9	2	Nicolas Aïssat	France	1:48.59	
10	1	Roman Oravec	Czech Republic	1:48.73	
11	1	Sergey Kozhevnikov	Russia	1:48.74	
12	2	Osmar Barbosa dos Santos	Brazil	1:50.06	

=== Final ===
Rank	Name	Nationality	Time	Notes
1st place, gold medalist(s)	David Krummenacker	United States	1:45.69	PB
2nd place, silver medalist(s)	Wilson Kipketer	Denmark	1:45.87	
3rd place, bronze medalist(s)	Wilfred Bungei	Kenya	1:46.54	
4	Antonio Manuel Reina	Spain	1:46.58	SB
5	Bram Som	Netherlands	1:47.00	
6	Arnoud Okken	Netherlands	1:48.71	
