= Glody Dube =

Botswanan middle-distance runner

Glody Dube (born 2 July 1978 in Matshelagabedi) is a retired Botswana middle distance runner who specialized in the 800 metres.

== Achievements ==
Year	Competition	Venue	Position	Event	Notes
Representing Botswana
1997	African Junior Championships	Ibadan, Nigeria	5th	800 m	1:50.16
1998	Commonwealth Games	Kuala Lumpur, Malaysia	9th (sf)	800 m	1:47.78
1999	World Indoor Championships	Maebashi, Japan	16th (sf)	800 m	1:49.57
1999	World Championships	Seville, Spain	21st (sf)	800 m	1:48.67
1999	All-Africa Games	Johannesburg, South Africa	7th	800 m	1:47.64
2000	Olympic Games	Sydney, Australia	7th	800 m	1:46.24
2000	Olympic Games	Sydney, Australia	14th (sf)	4 × 400 m relay	3:05.28
2001	World Indoor Championships	Lisbon, Portugal	5th	800 m	1:46.90
2001	World Championships	Edmonton, Canada	12th (sf)	800 m	1:46.91
2002	Commonwealth Games	Manchester, United Kingdom	8th	800 m	2:17.40
2003	World Indoor Championships	Birmingham, United Kingdom	4th (sf)	800 m	1:47.63
2003	World Championships	Paris, France	22nd (sf)	800 m	1:48.69
2004	Olympic Games	Athens, Greece	53rd (h)	800 m	1:48.25
2007	All-Africa Games	Algiers, Algeria	11th (sf)	800 m	1:49.71

=== Personal bests ===
- 800 metres - 1:44.59 min (2001)
- 1500 metres - 3:39.60 min (2001) – national record
