= João Pires (athlete) =

Portuguese middle-distance runner

João Manuel Pires (born 10 June 1979, in São João de Lobrigos) is a former Portuguese middle distance runner who specialized in the 800 metres and 1500 metres. He competed at the 2000 and 2004 Summer Olympics failing to advance to the final. He managed to reach the semifinals at the 2003 World Championships in Paris.

== Competition record ==
Year	Competition	Venue	Position	Event	Notes
Representing Portugal
1997	European Junior Championships	Ljubljana, Slovenia	12th (sf)	800 m	1:51.42
1998	Ibero-American Championships	Lisbon, Portugal	4th	800 m	1:50.73
1998	World Junior Championships	Annecy, France	4th	800 m	1:48.22
1999	European U23 Championships	Gothenburg, Sweden	5th	800 m	1:47.83
1999	World Championships	Seville, Spain	26th (h)	800 m	1:47.08
2000	Olympic Games	Sydney, Australia	20th (h)	800 m	1:47.61
2001	World Indoor Championships	Lisbon, Portugal	13th (h)	800 m	1:50.13
2001	European U23 Championships	Amsterdam, Netherlands	9th (h)	800m	1:48.92
2001	World Championships	Edmonton, Canada	17th (h)	800 m	1:47.34
2002	European Indoor Championships	Vienna, Austria	15th (h)	800 m	1:49.72
2003	World Indoor Championships	Birmingham, United Kingdom	18th (h)	800 m	1:50.76
2003	World Championships	Paris, France	23rd (sf)	800 m	1:49.19
2004	World Indoor Championships	Budapest, Hungary	14th (h)	1500 m	3:45.48
2004	Ibero-American Championships	Huelva, Spain	4th	800 m	1:47.29
2004	Olympic Games	Athens, Greece	29th (h)	800 m	1:46.71
2005	European Indoor Championships	Madrid, Spain	21st (h)	1500 m	3:50.51

== Personal bests ==
Outdoor

- 400 metres – 48.72 (2001)
- 800 metres – 1:45.59 (Zürich 2000)
- 1000 metres – 2:21.33 (Lisbon2004)
- 1500 metres – 3:42.66 (Braga 2001)

Indoor

- 800 metres – 1:47.33 (Stuttgart 2002)
- 1500 metres – 3:41.17 (Espinho 2004)
