= Tom Omey =

Belgian middle-distance runner

Tom Omey (born 24 April 1975 in Kortrijk) is a retired Belgian athlete who specialised in the 800 metres. He represented his country at three outdoor and two indoor World Championships.

== Competition record ==
Year	Competition	Venue	Position	Event	Notes
Representing Belgium
1998	European Indoor Championships	Valencia, Spain	17th (h)	800 m	1:50.89
2000	European Indoor Championships	Ghent, Belgium	5th (sf)	800 m	1:51.46
2001	World Indoor Championships	Lisbon, Portugal	7th (sf)	800 m	1:47.67
2001	World Championships	Edmonton, Canada	23rd (h)	800 m	1:48.37
2002	European Indoor Championships	Vienna, Austria	6th (sf)	800 m	1:48.75
2002	European Championships	Munich, Germany	22nd (h)	800 m	1:48.27
2003	World Championships	Paris, France	46th (h)	800 m	1:48.93
2004	World Indoor Championships	Budapest, Hungary	15th (sf)	800 m	1:51.15
2005	World Championships	Helsinki, Finland	35th (h)	800 m	1:49.62

== Personal bests ==
Outdoor

- 600 metres – 1:16.73 (Liège 2003)
- 800 metres – 1:45.75 (Rehlingen 2003)
- 1000 metres – 2:20.75 (Zwevegem 2000)
- 1500 metres - 3:41.97 (Oordegem 2005)

Indoor

- 800 metres – 1:47.67 (Lisbon 2001 – former national record)
- 1000 metres – 2:19.77 (Piraeus 2002)
- 1500 metres – 3:49.05 (Ghent 2006)
