= David Fiegen =

Luxembourgish middle distance runner

Personal information
- Nationality: Luxembourgish
- Born: 3 September 1984 (age 41)

Sport
- Sport: Track
- Event: 800 metres

Achievements and titles
- Personal bests: 400 metres: 47.76 NR; 600 metres: 1:16.15 NR; 800 metres: 1:44.81 NR; 1000 metres: 2:17.51 NR; 1500 metres: 3:39.98

David Fiegen (born 3 September 1984 in Esch-sur-Alzette) is a Luxembourgish middle-distance runner who specializes in the 800 metres.

He won the silver medal at the 2006 European Athletics Championships in Gothenburg, the first ever medal in the history of the championships for an athlete from Luxembourg. He also competed at the 2004 Olympics, and won a bronze medal at the 2002 World Junior Championships.

== Achievements ==
Year	Competition	Venue	Position	Event	Notes
Representing Luxembourg
2001	Games of the Small States of Europe	Serravalle, San Marino	2nd	800 m	1:51.54
2001	Games of the Small States of Europe	Serravalle, San Marino	2nd	4 × 400 m relay	3:18.86
2001	World Youth Championships	Debrecen, Hungary	7th	800 m	1:52.28
2001	European Youth Olympic Festival	Murcia, Spain	1st	800 m	1:54.18
2002	European Indoor Championships	Vienna, Austria	6th	800 m	1:47.44
2002	World Junior Championships	Kingston, Jamaica	3rd	800 m	1:46.66
2003	Games of the Small States of Europe	Marsa, Malta	1st	800 m	1:51.52
2003	European Junior Championships	Tampere, Finland	2nd	800 m	1:49.91
2003	World Championships	Paris, France	43rd (h)	800 m	1:48.80
2004	World Indoor Championships	Budapest, Hungary	19th (h)	800 m	1:50.02
2004	Olympic Games	Athens, Greece	36th (h)	800 m	1:46.97
2005	European Indoor Championships	Madrid, Spain	20th (h)	1500 m	3:49.50
2006	European Championships	Gothenburg, Sweden	2nd	800 m	1:46.59
2011	Games of the Small States of Europe	Schaan, Liechtenstein	4th	800 m	1:52.82
2014	European Championships	Zürich, Switzerland	33rd (h)	800 m	1:51.00
