= Osmar dos Santos =

Brazilian middle-distance runner

Personal information
- Born: October 20, 1968 (age 57) Marilia, Brazil

Sport
- Sport: Track and field
Medal record
Representing Brazil
World Indoor Championships
Bronze medal – third place	2004 Budapest	800m
Pan American Games
Silver medal – second place	2003 Santo Domingo	800m

Osmar Barbosa dos Santos (born October 20, 1968) is a retired Brazilian middle distance runner who competed mostly over 800 metres. He started competing internationally in 1996 and won a bronze medal at the 2004 World Indoor Championships.

== Competition record ==
Year	Competition	Venue	Position	Event	Notes
Representing Brazil
1995	South American Championships	Manaus, Brazil	1st	4 × 400 m relay	3:04.93
1996	Ibero-American Championships	Medellín, Colombia	2nd	4 × 400 m relay	3:04.28
1996	Olympic Games	Atlanta, United States	33rd (h)	400 m	46.16
1996	Olympic Games	Atlanta, United States	4th (h)	4 × 400 m relay	3:02.51
1997	World Indoor Championships	Paris, France	8th (h)	4 × 400 m relay	3:10.50
2000	Olympic Games	Sydney, Australia	20th (sf)	800 m	1:47.68
2002	Ibero-American Championships	Guatemala City, Guatemala	2nd	800 m	1:46.81
2003	World Indoor Championships	Birmingham, United Kingdom	12th (sf)	800 m	1:50.06
2003	South American Championships	Barquisimeto, Venezuela	2nd	800 m	1:46.92
2003	Pan American Games	Santo Domingo, Dominican Republic	2nd	800 m	1:49.63
2003	World Championships	Paris, France	8th	800 m	1:46.28
2004	World Indoor Championships	Budapest, Hungary	3rd	800 m	1:46.46
2004	Ibero-American Championships	Huelva, Spain	5th (h)	800 m	1:50.00
2004	Olympic Games	Athens, Greece	22nd (sf)	800 m	1:48.23
2005	World Championships	Helsinki, Finland	20th (h)	800 m	1:47.74
2006	World Indoor Championships	Moscow, Russia	9th (h)	800 m	1:48.30
2006	Ibero-American Championships	Ponce, Puerto Rico	1st	800 m	1:46.22

=== Personal bests ===
- 400 metres - 46.35 (1995)
- 800 metres - 1:44.87 (2000)
