= Nicolas Aissat =

French middle-distance runner

Nicolas Aissat (born 24 July 1980 in Toulouse) is a retired French middle-distance runner who specialised in the 800 metres. He represented his country at the 2004 Summer Olympics reaching the semifinals.

== Competition record ==
| Year | Competition | Venue | Position | Event | Notes |
Representing France
| 1998 | World Junior Championships | Annecy, France | 10th (sf) | 800 m | 1:51.11 |
| 1999 | European Junior Championships | Riga, Latvia | 4th | 800 m | 1:51.48 |
| 2001 | European U23 Championships | Amsterdam, Netherlands | 3rd | 800 m | 1:47.81 |
| 2002 | European Indoor Championships | Vienna, Austria | 10th (sf) | 800 m | 1:50.80 |
| 2002 | European Championships | Munich, Germany | 8th | 800 m | 1:49.16 |
| 2003 | World Indoor Championships | Birmingham, United Kingdom | 9th (sf) | 800 m | 1:48.59 |
| 2003 | World Championships | Paris, France | – | 800 m | DNF |
| 2004 | World Indoor Championships | Budapest, Hungary | 23rd (h) | 800 m | 1:50.65 |
| 2004 | Olympic Games | Athens, Greece | 17th (sf) | 800 m | 1:47.14 |
| 2005 | European Indoor Championships | Madrid, Spain | 10th (h) | 800 m | 1:49.12 |

== Personal bests ==
Outdoor

- 800 metres – 1:44.98 (Rovereto 2001)
- 1000 metres – 2:16.86 (Strasbourg 2001)
- 1500 metres – 3:41.15 (Pézenas 2005)

Indoor

- 800 metres – 1:47.06 (Stuttgart 2002)
- 1000 metres – 2:18.33 (Liévin 2003)
- 1500 metres – 3:44.12 (Liévin 2001)
