= Miguel Quesada =

Spanish middle-distance runner

Medal record

Men's Athletics

Representing Spain

European Indoor Championships
Silver medal – second place	2007 Birmingham	800 m

Miguel Quesada Velasco (born 18 September 1979 in Sabadell, Catalonia) is a Spanish middle distance runner. He specializes in the 800 metres.

Quesada finished fifth at the 2006 European Athletics Championships and won the silver medal at the 2007 European Athletics Indoor Championships.

Participating in the 2004 Olympics, he finished third in his heat, failing to progress to the semifinals.

His personal best time is 1:45.58 minutes, achieved in July 2008 in Barcelona.

== Competition record ==
Year	Competition	Venue	Position	Event	Notes
Representing Spain
2001	European U23 Championships	Amsterdam, Netherlands	11th (h)	800 m	1:49.37
2002	European Indoor Championships	Vienna, Austria	13th (h)	800 m	1:49.57
2002	Ibero-American Championships	Guatemala City, Guatemala	4th	800 m	1:47.10
2002	European Championships	Munich, Germany	15th (sf)	800 m	1:49.83
2004	Olympic Games	Athens, Greece	22nd (h)	800 m	1:46.32
2006	European Championships	Gothenburg, Sweden	5th	800 m	1:46.91
2007	European Indoor Championships	Birmingham, United Kingdom	2nd	800 m	1:47.96
2008	Olympic Games	Beijing, China	40th (h)	800 m	1:48.06
2009	European Indoor Championships	Turin, Italy	10th (sf)	800 m	1:52.12
