= Paskar Owor =

Ugandan middle-distance runner

Personal information
- Nationality: Ugandan
- Born: 22 December 1980 (age 45) Nagongera, Uganda
- Height: 1.62 m (5 ft 4 in)
- Weight: 59 kg (130 lb)

Sport
- Sport: Athletics
- Event: 800 metres

Paskar Owor (born 22 December 1980 in Nagongera) is a Ugandan retired middle-distance runner who specialised in the 800 metres. He represented his country at the 2000 and 2004 Summer Olympics without qualifying for the semifinals. He won the bronze medal in the event at the 1998 World Junior Championships.

== Competition record ==
Year	Competition	Venue	Position	Event	Notes
Representing Uganda
1998	World Junior Championships	Annecy, France	3rd	800 m	1:48.20
1998	Commonwealth Games	Kuala Lumpur, Malaysia	10th (sf)	800 m	1:47.90
1999	All-Africa Games	Johannesburg, South Africa	12th (sf)	800 m	1:49.23
1999	All-Africa Games	Johannesburg, South Africa	11th	1500 m	3:53.33
2000	Olympic Games	Sydney, Australia	51st (h)	800 m	1:49.99
2002	Commonwealth Games	Manchester, United Kingdom	7th	800 m	1:48.96
2003	All-Africa Games	Abuja, Nigeria	8th (h)	800 m	1:50.25
2004	World Indoor Championships	Budapest, Hungary	25th (h)	800 m	1:51.41
2004	Olympic Games	Athens, Greece	47th (h)	800 m	1:47.87
2005	World Championships	Helsinki, Finland	44th (h)	800 m	1:51.72

== Personal bests ==
=== Outdoor ===
- 800 metres – 1:46.37 (Strasbourg 2004)
- 1500 metres – 3:40.60 (2006)

=== Indoor ===
- 800 metres – 1:47.58 (Saarbrücken 2002)
