= Sergey Kozhevnikov =

Russian middle-distance runner

Personal information
- Born: 12 May 1970 (age 56)

Sport
- Sport: Track and field

Sergey Kozhevnikov (Cyrillic: Сергей Кожевников; born 12 May 1970) is a retired Russian athlete who specialised in the 800 metres. He represented his country at one outdoor and two indoor World Championships.

His personal bests in the event are 1:46.25 outdoors (Tula 2001) and 1:46.13 indoors (Vienna 2002).

== Competition record ==
| Year | Competition | Venue | Position | Event | Notes |
Representing Russia
| 1997 | World Championships | Athens, Greece | 32nd (h) | 800 m | 1:48.11 |
| 1997 | Universiade | Catania, Italy | 7th | 800 m | 1:49.51 |
| 1997 | Universiade | Catania, Italy | 5th | 4 × 400 m relay | 3:05.81 |
| 1998 | European Indoor Championships | Valencia, Spain | 16th (h) | 800 m | 1:50.76 |
| 1998 | European Championships | Budapest, Hungary | 18th (h) | 800 m | 1:47.71 |
| 2000 | European Indoor Championships | Ghent, Belgium | 20th (h) | 800 m | 1:53.86 |
| 2001 | World Indoor Championships | Lisbon, Portugal | 7th (h) | 800 m | 1:48.74 |
| 2002 | European Indoor Championships | Vienna, Austria | 5th | 800 m | 1:46.13 |
| 2003 | World Indoor Championships | Birmingham, United Kingdom | 11th (sf) | 800 m | 1:48.74 |
