= Grzegorz Krzosek =

Polish middle-distance runner

Personal information
- Born: 10 January 1976 (age 50) Lębork, Poland

Sport
- Sport: Track and field
Medal record
Representing Poland
European U23 Championships
Bronze medal – third place	1997 Turku	800m

Grzegorz Krzosek (born 10 January 1976) is a retired Polish middle-distance runner who specialised in the 800 metres. He represented his country at the 2001 World Championships in Athletics without qualifying for the semifinals.

== Competition record ==
Year	Competition	Venue	Position	Event	Notes
Representing Poland
1997	European U23 Championships	Turku, Finland	3rd	800 m	1:47.45
1997	Universiade	Catania, Italy	26th (h)	800 m	1:51.52
1997	Universiade	Catania, Italy	9th (h)	4 × 400 m relay	3:09.17
2000	European Indoor Championships	Ghent, Belgium	13th (h)	800 m	1:51.07
2001	World Championships	Edmonton, Canada	15th (h)	800 m	1:47.17
2001	Universiade	Beijing, China	5th (sf)	800 m	1:47.26
2002	European Championships	Munich, Germany	8th (sf)	800 m	1:47.82
2005	European Indoor Championships	Madrid, Spain	9th (h)	800 m	1:48.96
2006	European Championships	Gothenburg, Sweden	6th (sf)	800 m	1:48.11

== Personal bests ==
Outdoor

- 600 metres – 1:16.08 (Bogatynia 2005)
- 800 metres – 1:45.97 (Bydgoszcz 2001)
- 1000 metres – 2:22.31 (Siedlce 2001)

Indoor

- 800 metres – 1:47.74 (Chemnitz 2006)
