= Bram Som =

Dutch runner (born 1980)

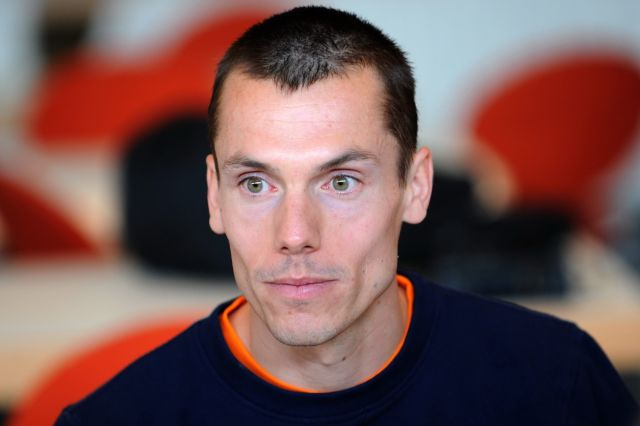

Personal information
- Full name: Bram Som
- Born: 20 February 1980 (age 46) Terborg, Netherlands
- Years active: 1987-present
- Height: 1.78 m (5 ft 10 in)
- Weight: 67 kg (148 lb)

Achievements and titles
- Personal bests: 400 m - 46.55 (2009); 800 m - 1:43.45 (2006); 1500 m - 3:46.08 (2009)
Medal record
European Championships
Gold medal – first place	2006 Gothenburg	800 metres
- Updated on 9 September 2009

Bram Som (born 20 February 1980, in Terborg) is a Dutch runner who specializes in the 800 metres. His personal best time of 1:43.45 minutes, achieved in August 2006 in Zürich, is also the current Dutch National Record. He missed the 2005 season, but returned in 2006 to win the national Dutch championship for the fifth time since 2000. Later that year he won the European championship.

Som participated in the 2000 Summer Olympics as well as the 2004 Summer Olympics. In 2000 he was eliminated in the first round as his time of 1:48.58 was not enough to advance. Four years later he would reach the semi-finals in which he came fifth with a time of 1:45.52.

He is currently an 800 m pacemaker, as of the 2016 Diamond League. He is the co-creator and operational director of Wavelight, a pacemaking tool originally designed for training and now used in some actual racing.

== Achievements ==
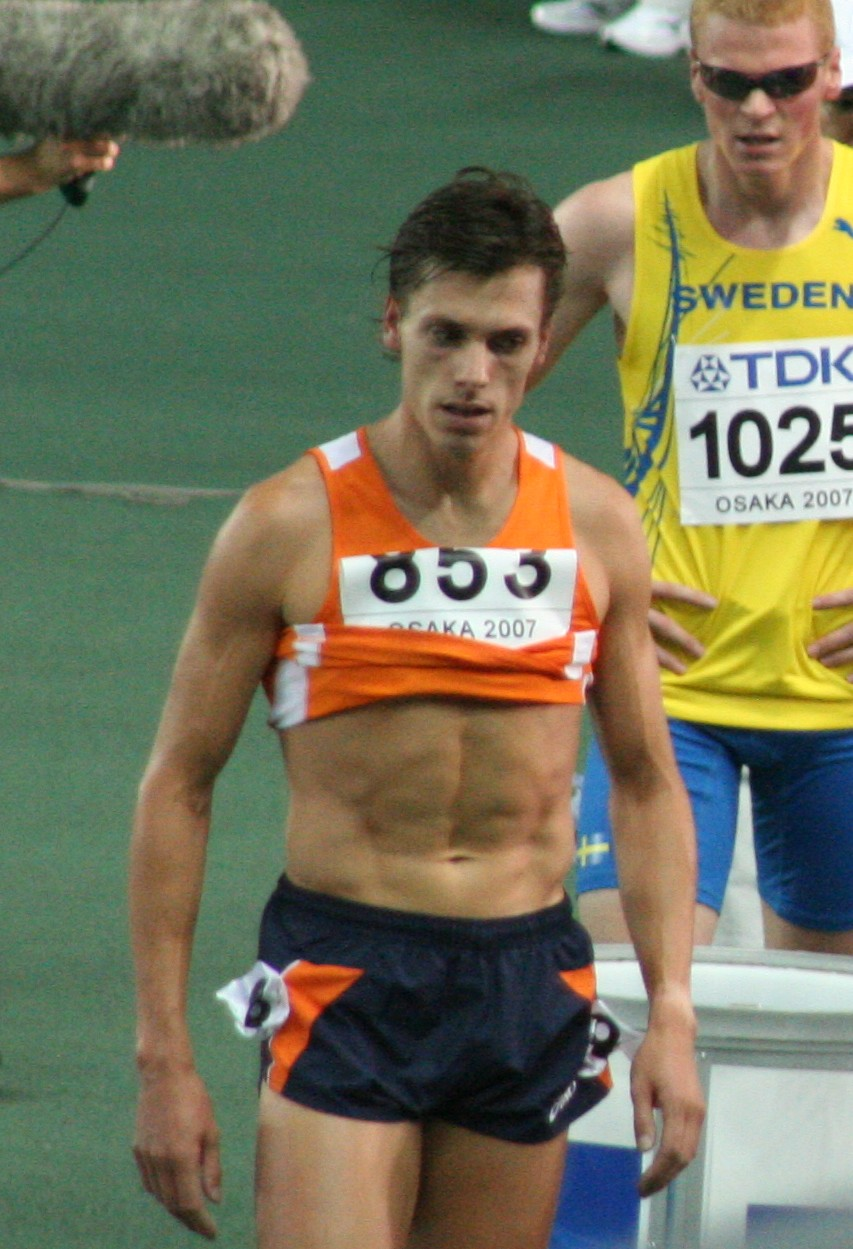
Som at the 2007 World Championships

Year	Competition	Venue	Position	Notes
Representing the Netherlands
1998	World Junior Championships	Annecy, France	5th	1:48.36
1999	European Junior Championships	Riga, Latvia	3rd	1:50.96
2000	Olympic Games	Sydney, Australia	42nd (h)	1:48.58
2001	World Indoor Championships	Lisbon, Portugal	11th (sf)	1:49.34
2001	European U23 Championships	Amsterdam, Netherlands	5th	1:47.84
2001	World Championships	Edmonton, Canada	13th (sf)	1:47.40
2002	European Indoor Championships	Vienna, Austria	11th (h)	1:49.08
2002	European Championships	Munich, Germany	6th	1:48.56
2003	World Indoor Championships	Birmingham, United Kingdom	5th	1:47.00
2003	World Championships	Paris, France	10th (sf)	1:46.63
2004	World Indoor Championships	Budapest, Hungary	11th (h)	1:48.55
2004	Olympic Games	Athens, Greece	7th (sf)	1:45.52
2004	World Athletics Final	Monte Carlo, Monaco	3rd	1:46.33
2006	European Championships	Gothenburg, Sweden	1st.	1:46.56
2006	World Cup	Athens, Greece	2nd	1:45.13
2006	World Athletics Final	Stuttgart, Germany	2nd.	1:47.10
2007	World Championships	Osaka, Japan	37th (h)	1:46.81
2009	World Championships	Berlin, Germany	7th	1:45.86
2011	World Championships	Daegu, South Korea	17th (sf)	1:46.69

== Personal Best times ==
Distance	Time
100 m	10.97
200 m	21.56
400 m	46.55
600 m	1:14.4
800 m	1:43.45
1000 m	2:17.01
1500 m	3:42.75
10 km	31:01

Awards
Preceded by Rens Blom	Men's Dutch Athlete of the Year; 2006	Succeeded by Rutger Smith
