= Terborg =

- City
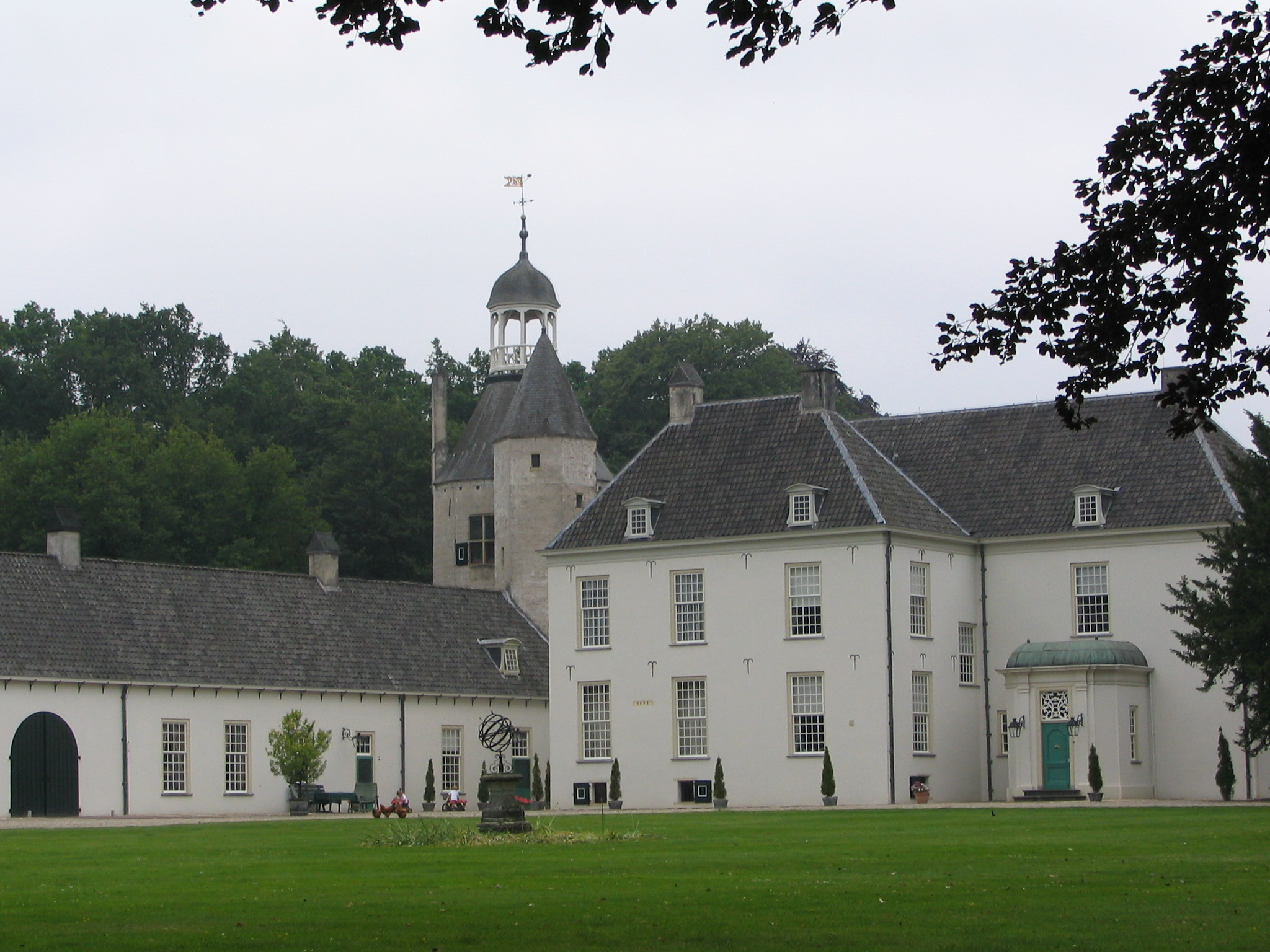
- Castle Wisch, Terborg

- Coat of arms

- Location in the Netherlands Terborg (Netherlands)
- Coordinates: 51°55′13″N 6°21′27″E
- Country: Netherlands
- Province: Gelderland
- Municipality: Oude IJsselstreek

Area
  - Total: 7.81 km^{2} (3.02 sq mi)
- Elevation: 14 m (46 ft)

Population (2021)
  - Total: 4,690
  - Density: 601/km^{2} (1,560/sq mi)
- Time zone: UTC+1 (CET)
  - Summer (DST): UTC+2 (CEST)
- Postal code: 7061
- Dialing code: 0315

Terborg is a small city in the Dutch province of Gelderland, in the Achterhoek region in the east of the Netherlands. It is located in the municipality of Oude IJsselstreek. The city lies about 7 km southeast of Doetinchem. The population is about 4600 inhabitants.

Terborg is situated on the river the Oude IJssel. In the centre of the little city lies Castle Wisch, founded in the 13th century (hence the name "Terborg" which means "by the castle"). In the southeast of the city, near Silvolde lies a small nature reserve called the Paasberg ("Easter Mountain"). Terborg has a train station on the train route Arnhem - Winterswijk, and trains call here twice every hour.

Terborg received city rights in 1419. The patron saint of the city is Saint George. Its coat of arms still is Saint George on a horse, killing a dragon.

Until 1813, Terborg was part of the fiefdom Wisch, together with the villages Silvolde en Varsseveld. Terborg was a separate municipality until 1818 when it was merged with Varsseveld into municipality Wisch (equal to the ancient fiefdom). In 2005 it formed municipality Oude IJsselstreek with municipality Gendringen.

In 1945, the town's Chasdei Enosh synagogue was blown up and destroyed by Nazis. An exact replica of the historic building opened on 7 June 2018 in Mevo Horon Israel, inaugurated by Israeli descendants of Dutch Jews. The old synagogue, on the Silvoldeseweg, was built in 1901.

== Gallery ==
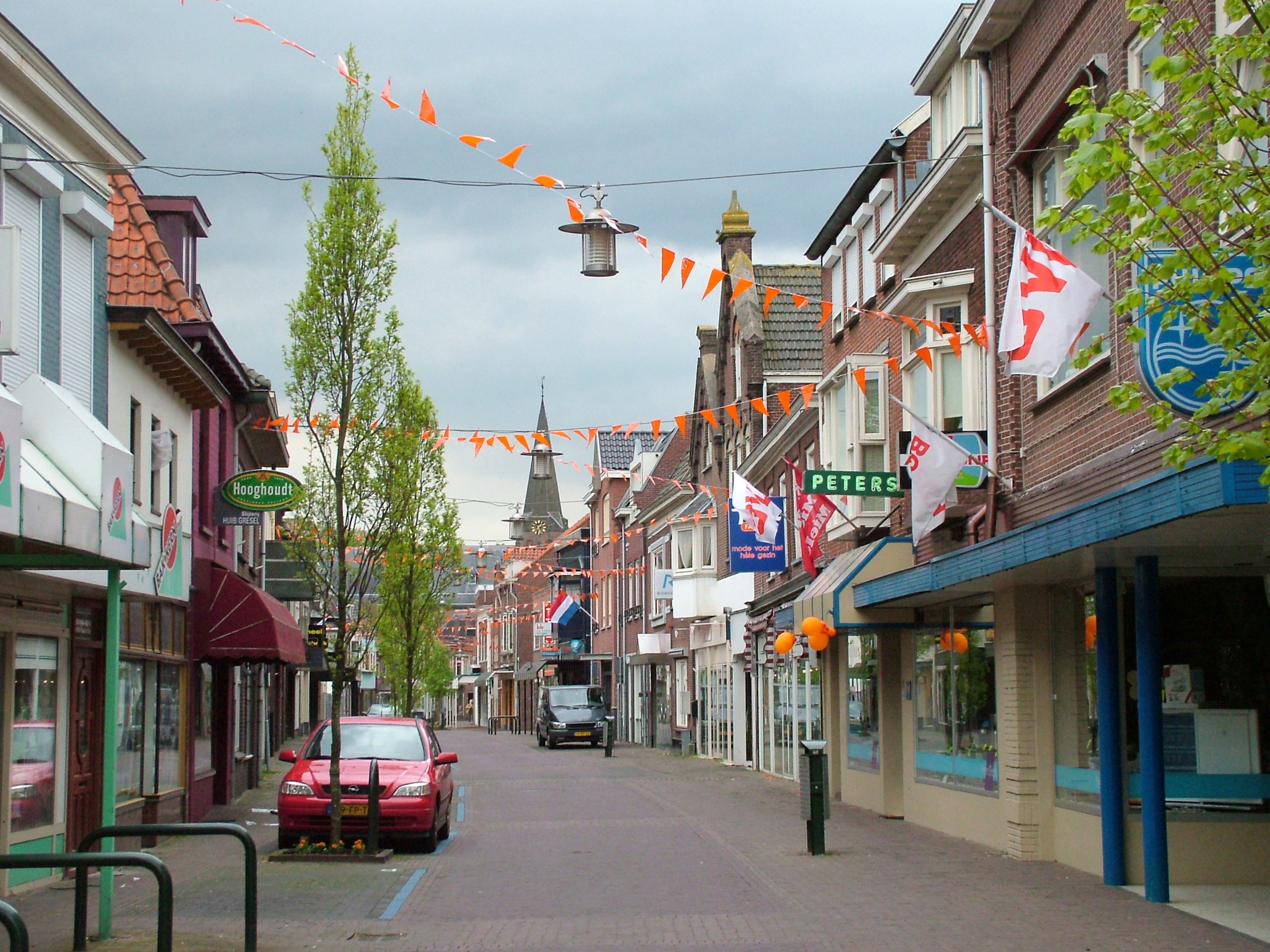
Main street

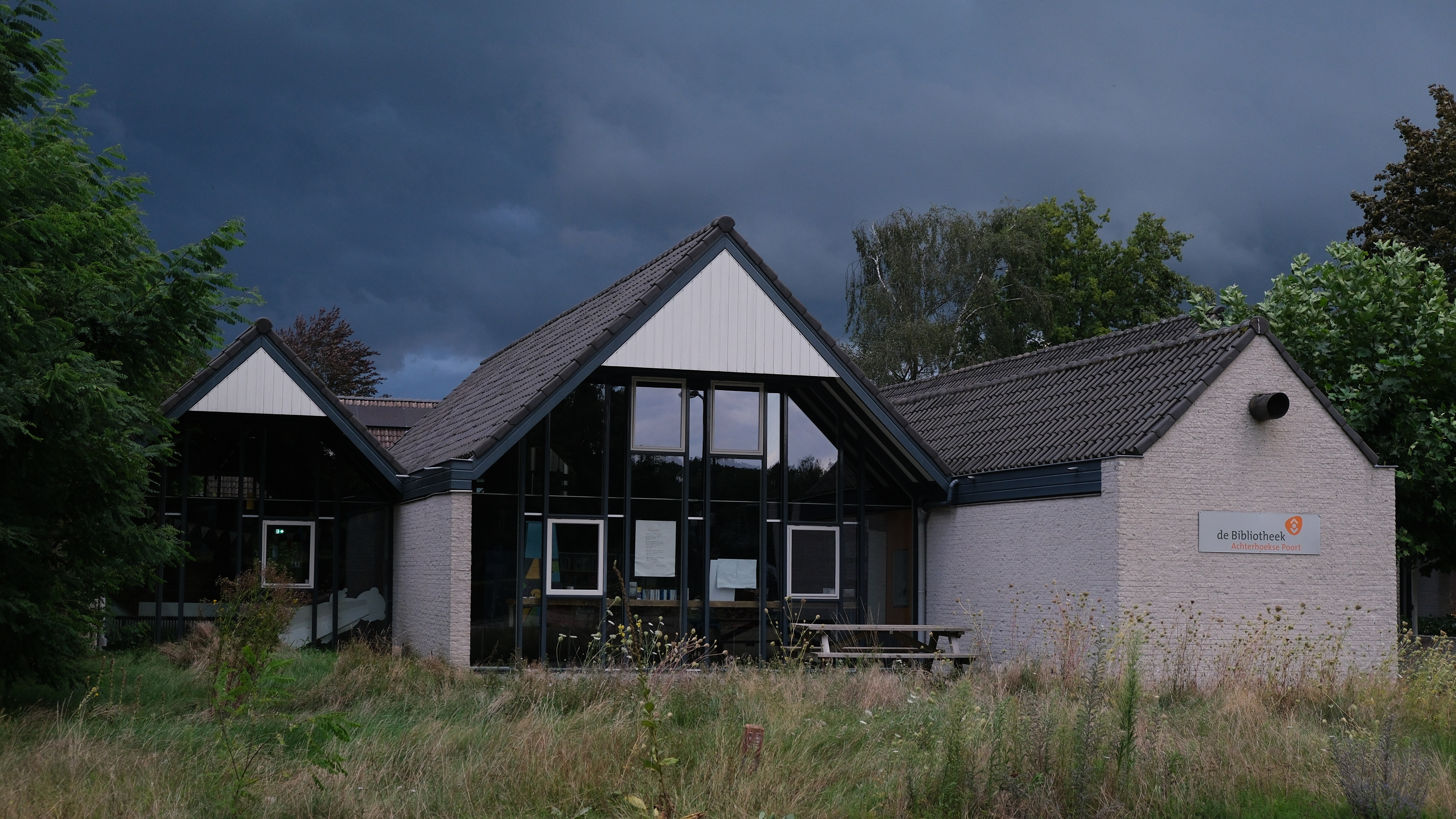
Library

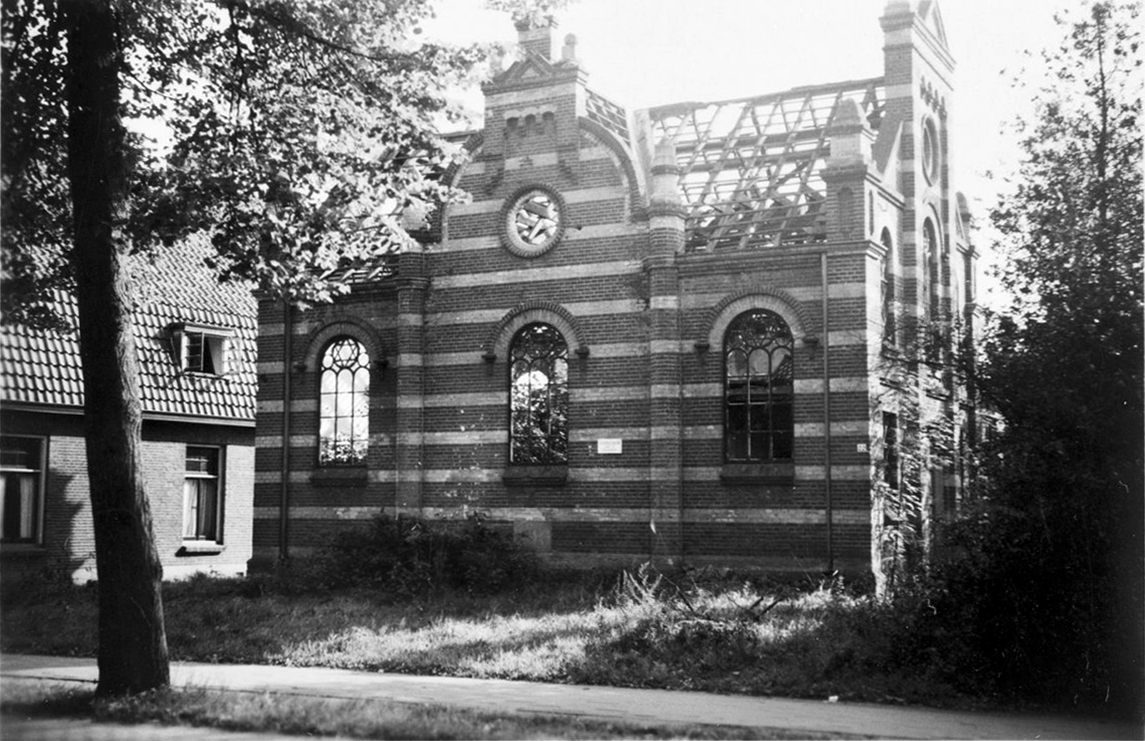
Synagogue Teborg, 1957

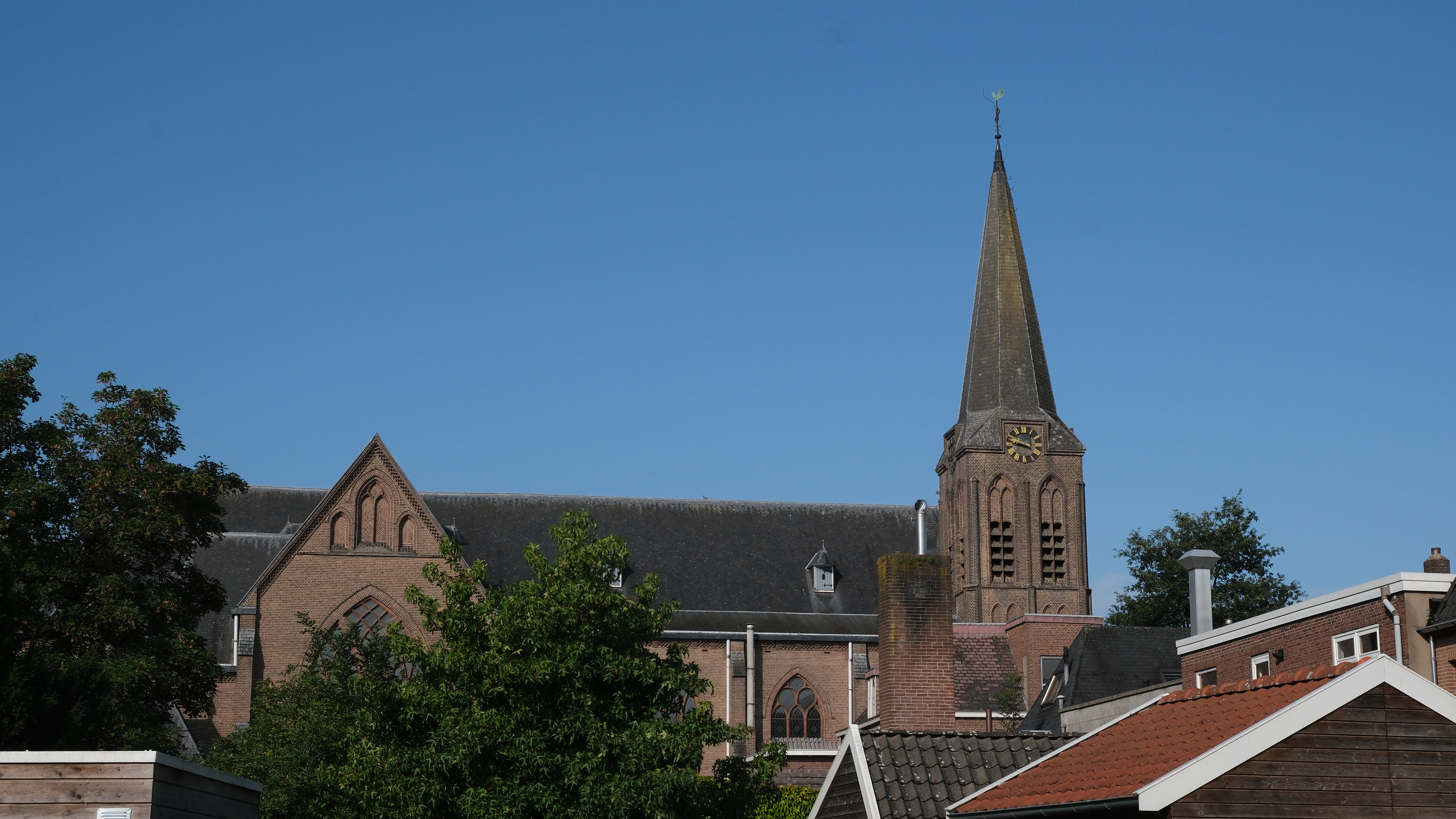
Former Saint Georgius church building

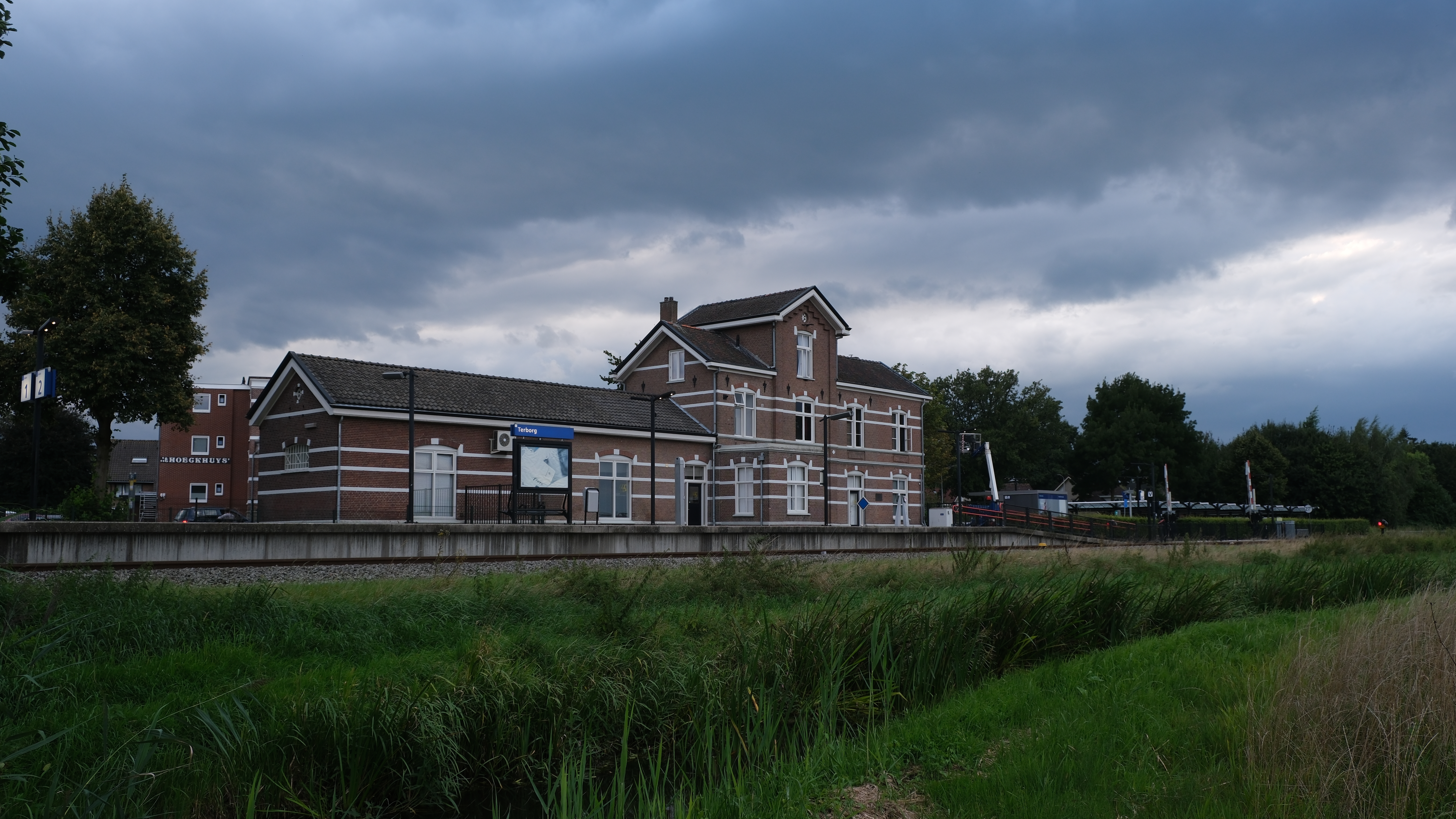
Train station, GOLS design

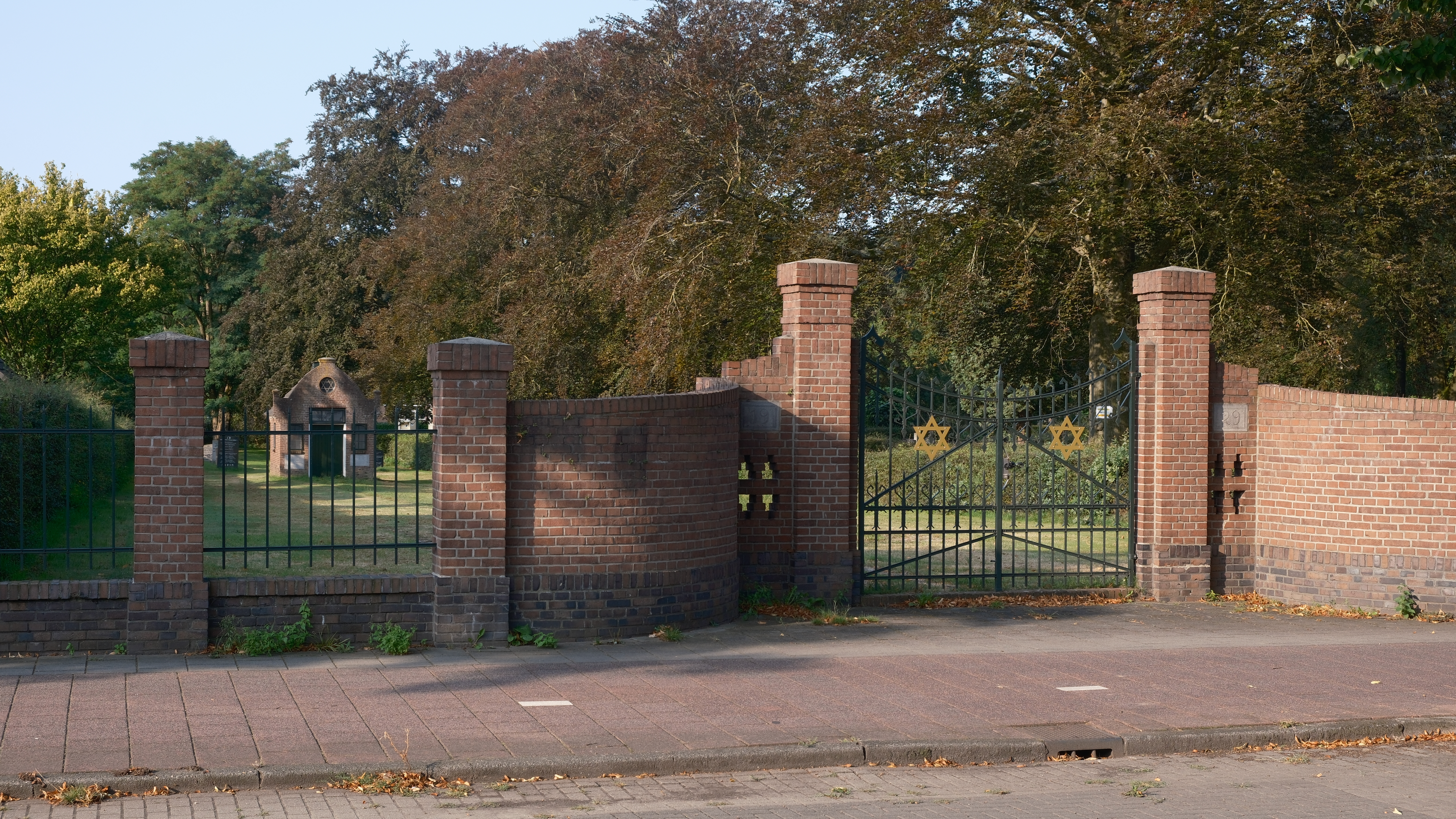
Former Jewish cemetery
