= Antonio Reina =

Spanish middle-distance runner

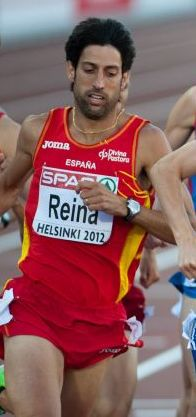
Antonio Manuel Reina at the 2012 European Championships

Antonio Manuel Reina Ballesteros (born 13 June 1981 in Osuna, Seville) is a Spanish middle distance runner. He specializes in the 800 metres.

== Competition record ==
Year	Competition	Venue	Position	Event	Notes
Representing Spain
2000	World Junior Championships	Santiago, Chile	3rd	800m	1:47.90
2000	World Junior Championships	Santiago, Chile	5th	4 × 400 m relay	3:09.22
2001	European U23 Championships	Amsterdam, Netherlands	1st	800m	1:47.74
2001	European U23 Championships	Amsterdam, Netherlands	4th	4 × 400 m relay	3:06.96
2001	World Championships	Edmonton, Canada	22nd (h)	800 m	1:48.26
2001	World Championships	Edmonton, Canada	6th	4 × 400 m relay	3:02.24
2001	Mediterranean Games	Radès, Tunisia	5th	4 × 400 m relay	3:08.24
2002	European Indoor Championships	Vienna, Austria	3rd	800 m	1:45.25 (iNR)
2002	European Championships	Munich, Germany	7th (sf)	800 m	1:47.41
2002	World Cup	Madrid, Spain	1st	800 m	1:43.83 (PB)
2003	World Indoor Championships	Birmingham, United Kingdom	4th	800 m	1:46.58
2003	World Championships	Paris, France	12th (sf)	800 m	1:46.72
2003	World Championships	Paris, France	5th	4 × 400 m relay	3:02.50
2004	World Indoor Championships	Budapest, Hungary	7th (sf)	800 m	1:47.33
2004	Ibero-American Championships	Huelva, Spain	1st	4 × 400 m relay	3:05.68
2004	Olympic Games	Athens, Greece	13th (sf)	800 m	1:46.17
2004	Olympic Games	Athens, Greece	14th (h)	4 × 400 m relay	3:05.03
2005	European Indoor Championships	Madrid, Spain	2nd	800 m	1:48.76
2005	Mediterranean Games	Almería, Spain	1st	800 m	1:47.03
2005	Mediterranean Games	Almería, Spain	1st	4 × 400 m relay	3:03.65
2005	World Championships	Helsinki, Finland	19th (sf)	800 m	1:46.89
2005	World Championships	Helsinki, Finland	16th (h)	4 × 400 m relay	3:08.03
2005	World Athletics Final	Monte Carlo, Monaco	7th	800 m	1:48.18
2007	World Championships	Osaka, Japan	28th (h)	800 m	1:46.35
2008	World Indoor Championships	Valencia, Spain	7th (h)	4 × 400 m relay	3:09.93
2008	Olympic Games	Beijing, China	13th (sf)	800 m	1:46.40
2009	European Indoor Championships	Turin, Italy	–	400 m	DNF
2010	Ibero-American Championships	San Fernando, Spain	3rd	800 m	1:46.15
2010	European Championships	Barcelona, Spain	12th (h)	4 × 400 m relay	3:07.38
2011	World Championships	Daegu, South Korea	23rd (sf)	800 m	1:48.45
2012	World Indoor Championships	Istanbul, Turkey	8th (sf)	800 m	1:48.36
2012	European Championships	Helsinki, Finland	4th	800 m	1:48.98
2012	Olympic Games	London, United Kingdom	15th (sf)	800 m	1:45.84

=== Personal bests ===
- 400 metres - 45.98 s (2005)
- 800 metres - 1:43.83 min (2002)
- 1500 metres - 4:09.08 min (1998)
