= Christian Neunhauserer =

Italian middle-distance runner

Personal information
- Born: 21 June 1978 (age 48) Bruneck, Italy

Sport
- Country: Italy
- Sport: Athletics
- Events: 800 m, 1500 m
- Club: G.S. Forestale

Achievements and titles
- Personal bests: 800 m: 1:46.07 (2002); 1500 m: 3:40.37 (2007)

Christian Neunhauserer (born 21 June 1978) is an Italian retired middle-distance runner. He represented his country at two consecutive World Indoor Championships.

== International competitions ==
Year	Competition	Venue	Position	Event	Notes
Representing Italy
2001	Universiade	Beijing, China	11th (sf)	800 m	1:48.08
2002	European Indoor Championships	Vienna, Austria	11th (sf)	800 m	1:50.82
2002	European Championships	Munich, Germany	21st (h)	800 m	1:48.25
2003	World Indoor Championships	Birmingham, United Kingdom	13th (h)	800 m	1:49.54
2003	Universiade	Daegu, South Korea	8th (sf)	800 m	1:49.49
2005	Mediterranean Games	Almería, Spain	7th	800 m	1:48.64
2005	Universiade	İzmir, Turkey	11th (sf)	800 m	1:49.08
2006	World Indoor Championships	Moscow, Russia	18th (h)	1500 m	3:47.90
2006	European Championships	Gothenburg, Sweden	24th (h)	1500 m	3:49.34

== Personal bests ==
Outdoor

- 400 metres – 49.00 (Milan 2003)
- 800 metres – 1:46.07 (Rome 2002)
- 1000 metres – 2:21.54 (Rupertwinkel 2001)
- 1500 metres – 3:40.37 (Villafranca 2007)

Indoor

- 800 metres – 1:47.72 (Stuttgart 2003)
- 1000 metres – 2:19.45 (Pireaus 2002)
- 1500 metres – 3:42.08 (Vienna 2006)
