= Jasmin Salihović =

Bosnian retired middle-distance runner (born 1980)

Personal information
- Nationality: Bosnian
- Born: February 18, 1980 (age 46) Skelani, SR Bosnia and Herzegovina, SFR Yugoslavia

Sport
- Sport: Track
- Event: 800 metres

Achievements and titles
- Personal bests: 400 metres: 48.07; 800 metres: 1:48.10

Jasmin Salihović (born 18 February 1980) is a Bosnian retired middle-distance runner who specialized in the 800 metres. He represented Bosnia and Herzegovina at the 2004 Summer Olympics.

== Early life ==
Salihović was born in Skelani. In 1992, at the age of 12 he and his family took refuge in Macedonia from the ensuing Bosnian War. However, in 1993 he moved to Tuzla. Many years after his athletic career, he would come back to live happily in Skelani.

== Running career ==
He made his first appearance at a major competition when he ran the men's 800-metre at the 2002 European Athletics Indoor Championships, finishing second to last of all runners who finished. In the men's 800-metre at the 2003 World Championships in Athletics, Salihović recorded a personal-best time of 1:48.10. A year later, Salihović became the first Bosnian after the breakup of Yugoslavia to run a middle-distance race at the Olympics when he ran in the third heat of the men's 800 metres at the 2004 Summer Olympics. However, he didn't beat his personal best time, recording a time of 1:49.59 (min:sec), although he finished ahead of Jan Sekpona.
