= Jimmy Lomba =

French middle-distance runner (born 1978)

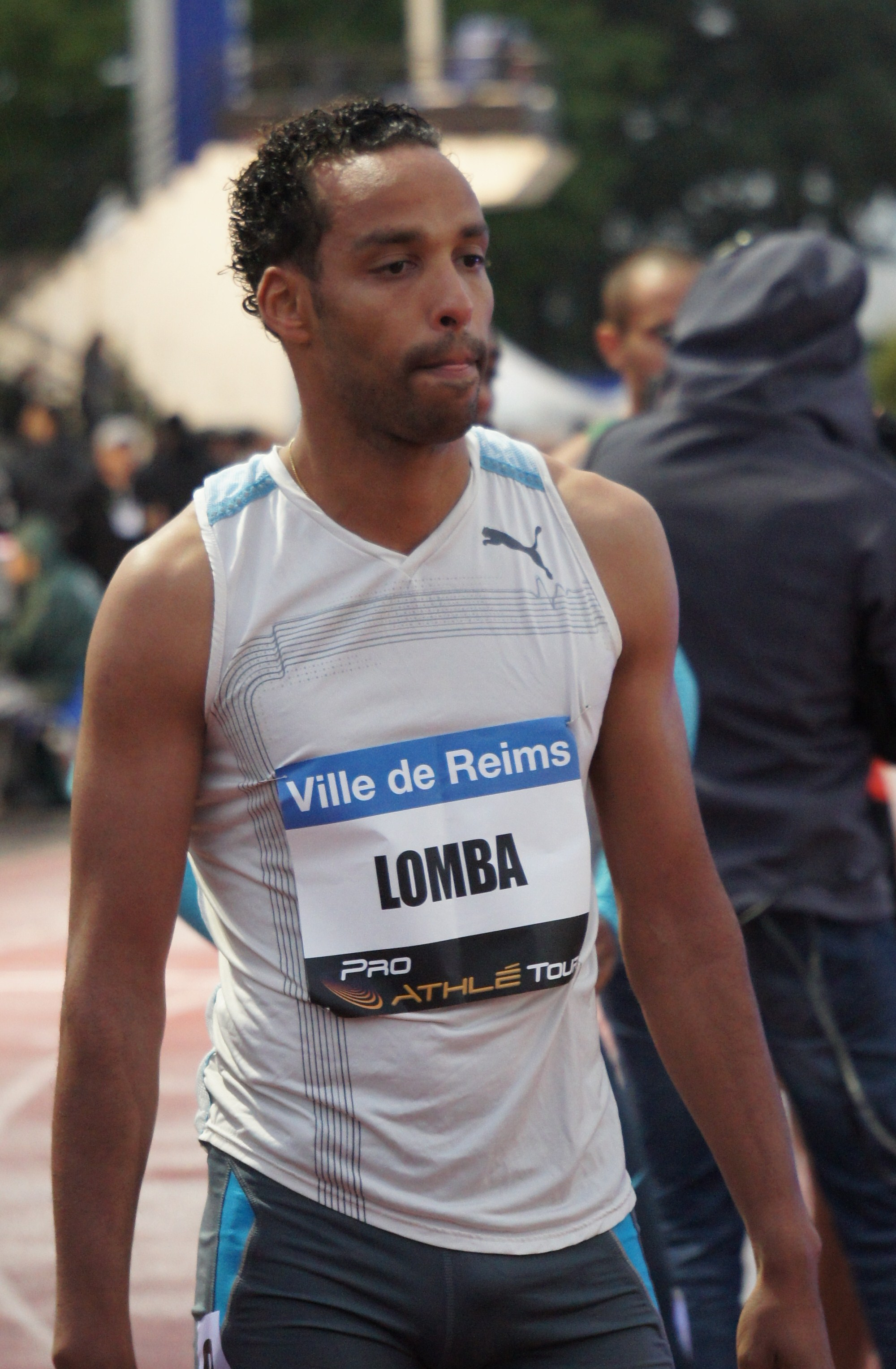
Rheims, 2013.

Jimmy Lomba (born 30 June 1978 in Lille) is a French athlete who specialises in the 800 metres. Lomba competed at the 2003 World Championships in Athletics.
