= James McIlroy (runner) =

British middle distance runner (born 1976)

James McIlroy BEM
Personal information
- Nationality: British (Northern Irish)
- Born: 30 December 1976 (age 48) Larne, Northern Ireland
- Height: 180 cm (5 ft 11 in)
- Weight: 70 kg (154 lb)

Sport
- Sport: Athletics
- Event: Middle-distance running
- Club: Windsor, Slough, Eton and Hounslow AC; Abbey Athletic Club

James Samuel McIlroy BEM (born 30 December 1976) is a British middle-distance runner who competed at the 2000 Summer Olympics.

== Biography ==
McIlroy, born in Larne, Northern Ireland, initially represented Ireland before changing his nationality to Great Britain and Northern Ireland. When he was 21 years old he showed great promise by finishing fourth over 800 metres in the 1998 European Athletics Championship having taken 14 seconds off his personal best in only 13 months. Serving a one-year ban for changing nationality, McIlroy, a member of Windsor, Slough & Eton, still produced the third fastest British all-time 1000 metres behind Sebastian Coe and Steve Cram when finishing 4th in Rieti, Italy.

In 2000 he became the British 800 metres champion after winning the British AAA Championships title at the 2000 AAA Championships. Shortly afterwards at the 2000 Olympic Games in Sydney, he represented Great Britain in the 800 metres event and made the Olympics semi-final.

Representing Northern Ireland McIlroy managed sixth place at the 2002 Commonwealth Games final in Manchester after getting badly boxed in. He also won a second 800 metres title at the 2002 AAA Championships. From 2002 onwards McIlroy spent considerable time in South Africa training and after being injured for most of the 2003/04 season, he again finished fourth at the European Indoor Championships in Valencia in 2005.

On 19 March 2008 McIlroy, who had been Britain's top middle-distance runner for a decade, announced his immediate retirement from athletics. He had competed for Great Britain & Northern Ireland earlier in the month at the World Indoor Athletics Championships in Valencia but failed to finish his opening round heat of the 1500 metres, due to pulled intercostal muscles. Apart from the blip in Spain, McIlroy has had a very successful indoor campaign winning the Irish 800 metres and UK 1500 metres titles.

McIlroy came out of retirement in 2010 whilst completing his MBA to compete at the New Delhi Commonwealth Games making the semi - finals of both the 800 metres and 1500 metres.

McIlroy was awarded the British Empire Medal (BEM) in the 2022 New Year Honours for services to athletics in Northern Ireland.
