= Joeri Jansen =

Belgian middle-distance runner

Personal information
- Born: 28 May 1979 (age 47) Turnhout, Belgium
- Height: 1.80 m (5 ft 11 in)
- Weight: 62 kg (137 lb)

Sport
- Country: Belgium
- Club: AS Rieme
- Updated on 25 July 2008

Joeri Jansen (born 28 May 1979 in Turnhout) is a former Belgian athlete that specialised in the 800 m.

== Biography ==
Jansen made his international breakthrough, when he was awarded the silver medal at the 2001 European Athletics U23 Championships. Four years later, he came in as 5th at the European Indoor Championship. He competed at the 2004 Summer Olympics but was eliminated in the heats.

== Achievements ==
Year	Competition	Venue	Position	Event	Notes
Representing Belgium
1998	World Junior Championships	Annecy, France	14th (sf)	800m	1:53.46
2001	European U23 Championships	Amsterdam, Netherlands	2nd	800m	1:47.80
2004	Olympic Games	Athens, Greece	26th (h)	800 m	1:46.66
2005	European Indoor Championships	Madrid, Spain	5th	1500 m	3:40.12
2007	European Indoor Championships	Birmingham, England	7th	1500 m	3:46.82

Personal bests
Event	Outdoor	Indoor
600 m	1'15"35 (NR)	
800 m	1'44"38	1'46"46 (NR)
1,000 m		2'18"65 (NR)
1,500 m	3'35"97	3'40"12
(NR) – National record
