= Dmitry Bogdanov =

Russian middle-distance runner

Medal record

Men's athletics

Representing Russia

European Indoor Championships
Gold medal – first place	2005 Madrid	800 m

Dmitriy Anatolyevich Bogdanov (Russian: Дмитрий Анатольевич Богданов, born 11 April 1979) is a Russian middle-distance runner who specializes in the 800 metres. His personal best times are 1:44.33 minutes in the 800 metres and 46.50 seconds in the 400 metres.

== Career ==
He was born in Saint Petersburg and represents the club Dinamo Saint Petersburg. He finished seventh at the 1998 World Junior Championships. The time he achieved, 1:48.91 minutes, was a personal best. He progressed further to 1:46.61 minutes (July 1999, Tula) and 1:45.76 minutes (July 2000, Tula). He competed at the 2000 European Indoor Championships and the 2000 Olympic Games in both 800 metres and 4 × 400 metres relay without reaching the final. At the 2001 European U23 Championships he won a bronze medal in the relay. He finished fourth at the 2002 European Indoor Championships in a time of 1:45.84 minutes, which would remain his indoor personal best for many years. In July 2002 he set his lifetime best in the 400 metres, 46.50 seconds achieved in Moscow.

A less successful period in international championships then followed. He competed without reaching the final at the 2002 European Championships, the 2003 World Championships, the 2004 World Indoor Championships, the 2004 Olympic Games. He then won the gold medal at the 2005 European Indoor Championships. He also competed in relay at the 2003 World Indoor Championships, but the team was disqualified.

He then competed without reaching the final at the 2005 World Championships, the 2006 European Championships, the 2007 World Championships and the 2008 Olympic Games. He finished fifth at the 2006 IAAF World Cup and the 2008 World Indoor Championships. In the latter race he finally set a new indoor PB, 1:45.76 minutes, which still stands. Outdoors he had set several successive personal bests, year by year: 1:45.72 minutes in 2002 (July, Cuxhaven), 1:45.28 minutes in 2003 (June, Seville), 1:45.12 minutes in 2004 (June, Ratingen) and finally 1:44.33 minutes in 2006 (July, Athens). Bogdanov also holds the European indoor record in the 4 × 800 metres relay, with 7:15.77 minutes achieved in February 2008.

He became Russian champion in 2000, 2002, 2003, 2004 and 2005, and Russian indoor champion in 2002 and 2005.
