= Arnoud Okken =

Dutch middle-distance runner

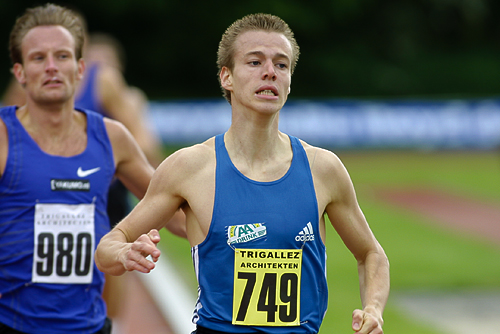
- Okken in 2002

Personal information
- Born: 20 April 1982 (age 44) Doetinchem, Netherlands
- Height: 1.82 m (6 ft 0 in)
- Weight: 65 kg (143 lb)

Achievements and titles
- Personal bests: 400 m – 47.84 (2002); 800 m – 1:45.64 (2001); 1000 m – 2:17.30 (2010); 1500 m – 3:37.46 (2002); Mile - 4:07.52 (2002)
Medal record
Men's athletics
Representing Netherlands
European Indoor Championships
| Gold medal – first place | 2007 Birmingham | 800 m |
- Updated on 24 May 2010

Arnoud Okken (born 20 April 1982) is a Dutch track and field athlete specialising in the 800 metres.

His first international victory came at the 2007 European Athletics Indoor Championships. Commenting on the win, Okken stated that "my plan was to take the lead and keep away from any trouble. Fortunately, I managed to do this." As Bram Som won the 2006 European Athletics Championships, the Netherlands held the European 800 m title both indoor and outdoor.

== Achievements ==
| Year | Competition | Venue | Position | Event | Notes |
Representing the Netherlands
| 2000 | World Junior Championships | Santiago, Chile | 5th | 800 m | 1:49.10 |
| 2001 | Universiade | Beijing, China | 4th | 800 m | 1:45.64 PB |
| 2002 | European Championships | Munich, Germany | 5th | 800 m | 1:48.39 |
| 2003 | World Indoor Championships | Birmingham, England | 6th | 800 m | 1:48.71 |
| 2005 | European Indoor Championships | Madrid, Spain | 5th | 800 m | 1:49.77 |
| 2007 | European Indoor Championships | Birmingham, England | 1st | 800 m | 1:47.92 |
| 2007 | Dutch National Championships | Amsterdam, Netherlands | 1st | 800 m | |
| 2010 | European Championships | Barcelona, Spain | 4th | 800 m | 1:47.31 |

=== Personal bests ===
- 400 metres - 47.84 s
- 800 metres - 1:45.64 min (2001)
- 1500 metres - 3:37.46 min (2002)
- Mile - 4:07.52 min (2002)
