= Rizak Dirshe =

Swedish middle-distance runner

Rizak Dirshe (born 5 January 1972 in Somalia) is a Swedish middle distance runner who specialized in the 800 metres and the 1500 metres. He represented the sports clubs Skellefteå AIK, Hälle IF and Malmö AI.

He finished ninth in the 1500 m at the 2006 European Championships. He also competed at the European Championships in 1998 and 2002, the World Indoor Championships in 2001 and 2004 and then World Championships in 2003 and 2005 without reaching the finals. He became Swedish 800 metres champion in 1997, 1998, 2000, 2002 and 2004.

His personal best time was 1:45.45 minutes, achieved in July 2003 in Cuxhaven. This is the Swedish record. In the 1500 metres he has 3:38.47 minutes from July 2006 in Stockholm, placing him seventh among Swedish 1500 m runners.
