= Juan de Dios Jurado =

Spanish middle-distance runner

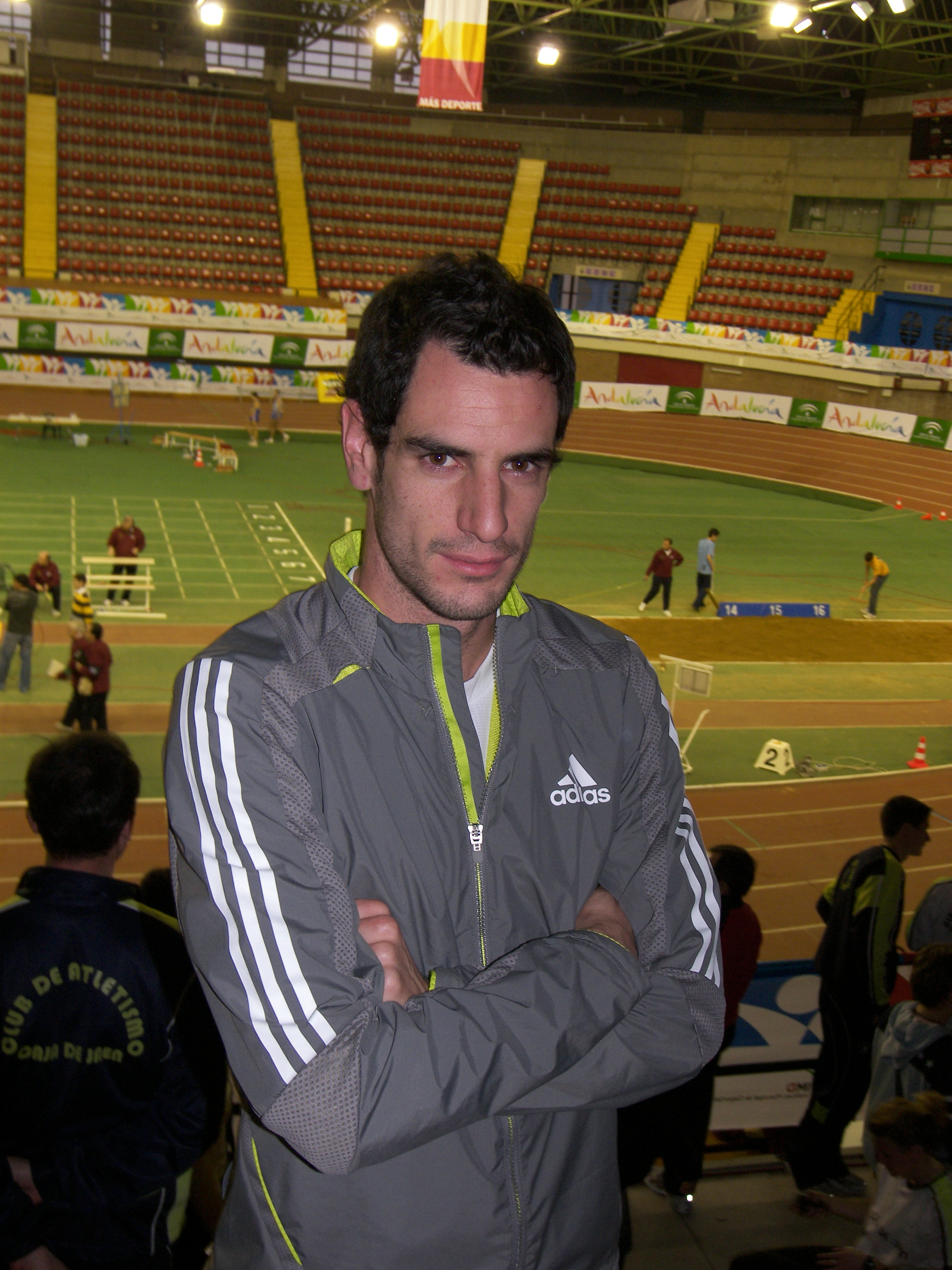

Juan de Dios Jurado (born 9 April 1981) is a Spanish middle-distance runner who specializes in the 800 metres.

He finished third at the 2005 European Indoor Athletics Championships in Madrid but failed to achieve a medal at the 2006 IAAF World Indoor Championships in Moscow where his time was 1.47:38, just ahead of Welsh athlete Jimmy Watkins.

His personal best time over 800 m is 1:45.42 min, achieved in June 2006 in Huelva.
