= Florent Lacasse =

French middle-distance runner

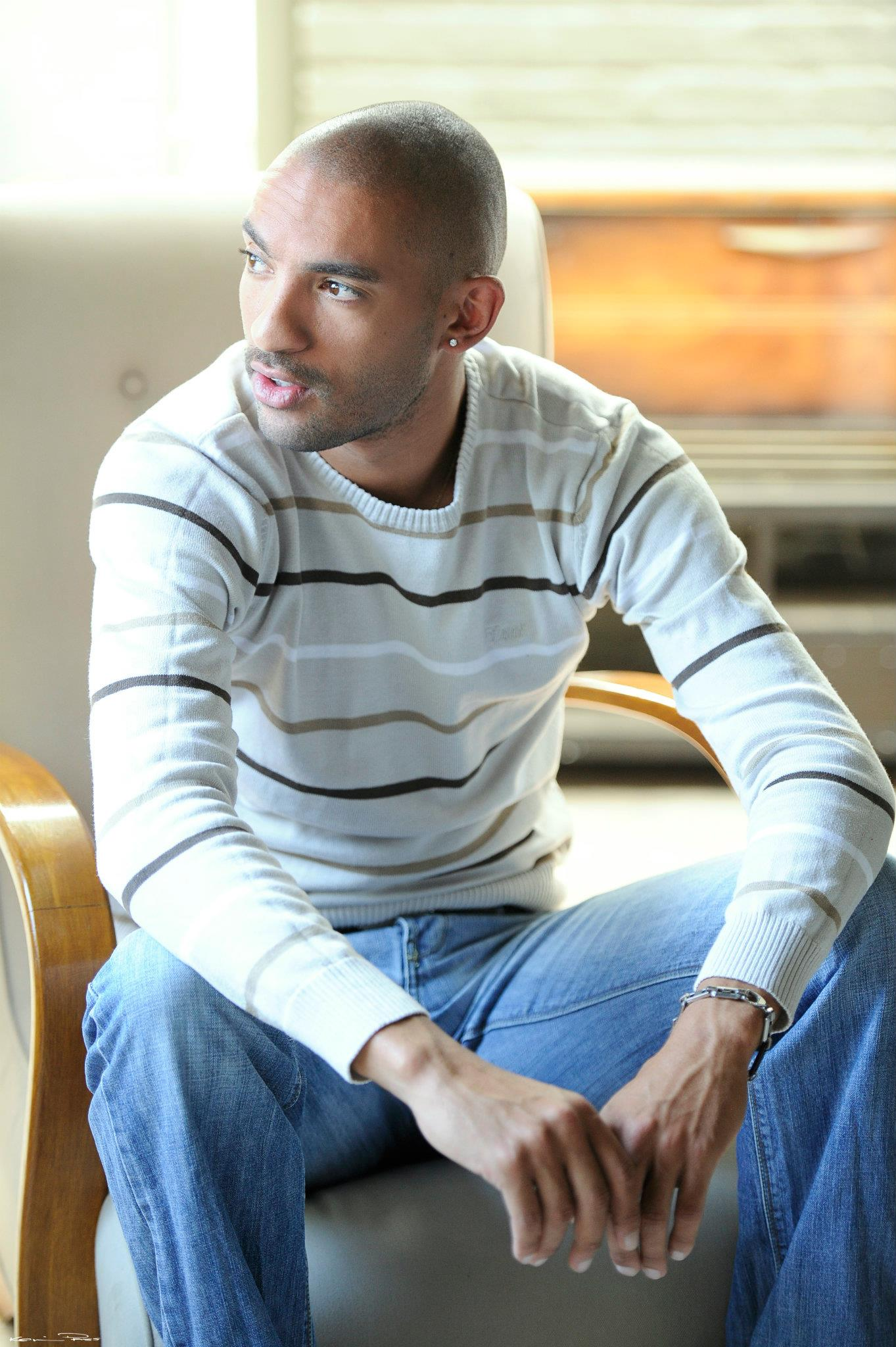

Florent Lacasse (born 21 January 1981 in Paris) is a French middle-distance runner who specializes in the 800 metres.

He finished sixth at the 2006 European Athletics Championships and seventh at the 2006 IAAF World Cup. He also competed in the 2004 Olympics.

In 2007 Lacasse was found guilty of testosterone doping. The sample was delivered on 18 May 2007 in an out-of-competition test in Manosque. He received an IAAF suspension from July 2007 to July 2009.

His personal best time is 1:44.48 minutes, achieved in July 2004 in Rome.

== See also ==
- List of sportspeople sanctioned for doping offences
