= Zambia at the 2002 Commonwealth Games =

- Flag of Zambia
- IOC code: ZAM
- NOC: National Olympic Committee of Zambia

in Manchester, Great Britain 25 July 2002 – 4 August 2002
- Competitors: 26 (21 men and 5 women) in 9 sports
- Medals Ranked 20th: Gold 1 Silver 1 Bronze 1 Total 3

Commonwealth Games appearances (overview)
- 1954; 1958; 1962–1966; 1970; 1974; 1978; 1982; 1986; 1990; 1994; 1998; 2002; 2006; 2010; 2014; 2018; 2022; 2026; 2030

Other related appearances
- Rhodesia and Nyasaland (1962)

Zambia competed in its ninth Commonwealth Games in Manchester in 2002. It was the third time that the nation had won a gold medal at the games and its most recent success.

== Competitors ==
The following is the list of number of competitors participating at the Games per sport/discipline.

Sport	Men	Women	Total
Athletics	3	1	4
Badminton	1	1	2
Boxing	5	—N/a	5
Cycling	2	0	2
Judo	3	0	3
Lawn Bowls	1	2	3
Squash	3	0	3
Swimming	2	1	3
Weightlifting	1	0	1
Total	21	5	26

== Medal summary ==
=== Medal table ===
Medal	Name	Sport	Event	Date
Gold	Kennedy Kanyanta	Boxing	Men's 51 kg	3 August
Silver	Denis Zimba	Boxing	Men's 60 kg	3 August
Bronze	Davis Mwale	Boxing	Men's 63.5 kg	3 August

Medals by sport
Sport	1st place, gold medalist(s)	2nd place, silver medalist(s)	3rd place, bronze medalist(s)	Total
Boxing	1	1	1	3
Total	1	1	1	3

Medals by date
Day	Date	1st place, gold medalist(s)	2nd place, silver medalist(s)	3rd place, bronze medalist(s)	Total
9	3 August	1	1	1	3
Total		1	1	1	3

Medals by gender
Gender	1st place, gold medalist(s)	2nd place, silver medalist(s)	3rd place, bronze medalist(s)	Total
Male	1	1	1	3
Female	0	0	0	0
Mixed	0	0	0	0
Total	1	1	1	3

== Athletics ==
Men

Athlete	Event	Heat		Semifinal		Final	
Athlete	Event	Result	Rank	Result	Rank	Result	Rank
Sylvester Chishiba	400 m	DNS		Did not advance			
Sylvester Chishiba	800 m	1:50.86	19	Did not advance			
Prince Mumba	800 m	1:48.40	4 Q	1:48.51	13	Did not advance	
Obed Mutanya	5000 m	—N/a				13:39.74	10

Women

Athlete	Event	Heat		Semifinal		Final	
Athlete	Event	Result	Rank	Result	Rank	Result	Rank
Addeh Mwamba	800 m	DNS		Did not advance			
Addeh Mwamba	1500 m	—N/a		4:35.76	17	Did not advance	

== Badminton ==
Zambia participated with two athletes (one man and one woman)

Men

Athlete	Event	Round of 128	Round of 64	Round of 32	Round of 16	Quarterfinal	Semifinal	Final / BM	
Athlete	Event	Opposition Score	Opposition Score	Opposition Score	Opposition Score	Opposition Score	Opposition Score	Opposition Score	Rank
Eli Mambwe	Singles	Bye	Richard Vaughan (WAL); L (2–7, 0–7, 2–7)	Did not advance					

Women

Athlete	Event	Round of 64	Round of 32	Round of 16	Quarterfinal	Semifinal	Final / BM	
Athlete	Event	Opposition Score	Opposition Score	Opposition Score	Opposition Score	Opposition Score	Opposition Score	Rank
Jean Mabiza	Singles	Kerry Ann Sheppard (WAL); L (3–7, 7–5, 1–7, 2–7)	Did not advance					

Mixed

Athlete	Event	Round of 64	Round of 32	Round of 16	Quarterfinal	Semifinal	Final / BM	
Athlete	Event	Opposition Score	Opposition Score	Opposition Score	Opposition Score	Opposition Score	Opposition Score	Rank
Eli Mambwe; Jean Mabiza	Mixed Doubles	Bruce Topping / Jayne Plunkett (NIR); L (1–7, 4–7, 0–7)	Did not advance					

== Boxing ==
Zambia participated with a team of 5 athletes.

Key:

- RSC – Referee stops contest (unspecified).
- RSCO – Referee stops contest for an outclassed opponent.

Men

Athlete	Event	Round of 32	Round of 16	Quarterfinals	Semifinals	Final	Rank
Athlete	Event	Opposition Result	Opposition Result	Opposition Result	Opposition Result	Opposition Result	Rank
Kennedy Kanyanta	−51 kg	Bye	Matthew Edmonds (WAL); W RSCO (Round 2)	Bruno Julie (MRI); W 30-21	Sébastien Gauthier (CAN); W 34-26	Lechedzani Luza (BOT); W 25-12	1st place, gold medalist(s)
Jonathan Mwila	−57 kg	Thomas Aryeetey (GHA); W 19–18	Benoit Gaudet (CAN); L RSCO (Round 2)	Did not advance			
Denis Zimba	−60 kg	Bye	Kennis Joseph (GRN); W 25-16	Giovanni Frontin (MRI); W 29-28	Andrew Morris (ENG); W 26-22	Jamie Arthur (WAL); L 35-37	2nd place, silver medalist(s)
Davis Mwale	−63.5 kg	Bye	Julius William (TAN); W RSCO (Round 3)	Vivian Bryan (WAL); W RSC (Round 4)	Mohammed Kayongo (UGA); L 22-28	Did not advance	3rd place, bronze medalist(s)
Derick Fimbo	−75 kg	—N/a	Paul Miller (AUS); L RSCO (Round 2)	Did not advance			

== Cycling ==
Zambia participated with 2 athletes (2 men).

=== Road ===
Men

Athlete	Event	Time	Rank
Maimba Malako	Time Trial	1:20:18.63	37
Maimba Malako	Road Race	DNF	
Bruce Nkhoma	Time Trial	1:20:44.53	38
Bruce Nkhoma	Road Race	DNF	

== Judo ==
Men

Athlete	Event	Round of 16	Quarterfinals	Semifinals	Repechage 1	Repechage 2	Final / BM	
Athlete	Event	Opposition Result	Opposition Result	Opposition Result	Opposition Result	Opposition Result	Opposition Result	Rank
Gabriel Kunda	−66 kg	Laval Collet (MRI); L 0001–0010	Did not advance					
Hitra Shakanungu	−73 kg	Craig Ewers (WAL); L 0000–1002	Did not advance					
Elijah Chirwa	−90 kg	Bye	Keith Morgan (CAN); L 0000–1000	Did not advance	Gbenga Oteje (NGR); L 0000–1000	Did not advance		

== Lawn bowls ==
Men

Athlete	Event	Group stage						Quarterfinal	Semifinal	Final / BM	
Athlete	Event	Opposition Score	Opposition Score	Opposition Score	Opposition Score	Opposition Score	Rank	Opposition Score	Opposition Score	Opposition Score	Rank
Edward Nkole	Singles	Ryan Bester (CAN); L 7–21	Mervyn King (ENG); W 21–14	Garry Ryan (NFI); W 21–16	Roy Garden (ZIM); W 21–20	—N/a	2 Q	Jeremy Henry (NIR); L 11–21	Did not advance		5

Women

Athlete	Event	Group stage					Quarterfinal	Semifinal	Final / BM	
Athlete	Event	Opposition Score	Opposition Score	Opposition Score	Opposition Score	Rank	Opposition Score	Opposition Score	Opposition Score	Rank
Hilda Luipa; Beatrice Mali	Pairs	Hajah Amalia Haji Matali / Hajah Suhana Haji Mohd Daud (BRU); W 18–13	Alison Birch / Sheila Syvret (JER); L 7–23	Kitha Bailey / Zilpha Quintal (NFI); W 18–7	Joyce Lindores / Margaret Russell (SCO); L 11–16	3	Did not advance			10

== Squash ==
Singles

Athlete	Event	Round of 64	Round of 32	Round of 16	Quarterfinals	Semifinals	Final	Rank
Athlete	Event	Opposition Score	Opposition Score	Opposition Score	Opposition Score	Opposition Score	Opposition Score	Rank
Patrick Chifunda	Singles	Kelvin Ho (MAS); W 3–2 (5–9, 9–7, 9–3, 4–9, 9–2)	Shahid Zaman (PAK) (15); L 0–3 (9–10, 6–9, 7–9)	Did not advance				
Ernest Chisenga	Singles	Graham Ryding (CAN) (16); L 0–3 (0–9, 8–10, 2–9)	Did not advance					
Ernest Chisenga	Singles	—N/a	Plate Round of 32; Keabetsoe Monnapula (LES); W 3–0 (9–4, 9–3, 9–1)	Plate Round of 16; Neil Frankland (SCO); L DNS	Did not advance			
Masambo Selisho	Singles	Gareth Webber (GUE); L 1–3 (5–9, 5–9, 9–4, 4–9)	Did not advance					
Masambo Selisho	Singles	—N/a	Plate Round of 32; Wayne Prescod (JAM); W 3–0 (9–2, 9–2, 9–2)	Plate Round of 16; Baitsi Motsamai (LES); W 3–0 (9–0, 9–5, 9–3)	Quarterfinal Plate; Murray Martin (ZIM); W 3–0 (9–7, 9–2, 9–0)	Semifinal Plate; Neil Frankland (SCO); L 0–3 (2–9, 5–9, 2–9)	Did not advance	

Doubles

Athlete	Event	Group stage				Round of 16	Quarterfinals	Semifinals	Final	
Athlete	Event	Opposition Score	Opposition Score	Opposition Score	Rank	Opposition Score	Opposition Score	Opposition Score	Opposition Score	Rank
Patrick Chifunda; Ernest Chisenga	Men's doubles	Lee Beachill / Peter Nicol (ENG); L 0–2	Murray Martin / Jesse Engelbrecht (ZIM); L 1–2	Rajdeep Bains / Hartaj Bains (KEN); W 2–1	3	Did not advance				

== Swimming ==
Three athletes represented Zambia in swimming:

Men

Athlete	Event	Heat		Semifinal		Final	
Athlete	Event	Time	Rank	Time	Rank	Time	Rank
Chisela Kanchela	50 m breaststroke	33.07	17	Did not advance			
Chisela Kanchela	100 m breaststroke	1:13.32	23	Did not advance			
Chisela Kanchela	200 m breaststroke	2:53.66	17	—N/a		Did not advance	
Andre Kuenzli	50 m freestyle	27.24	47	Did not advance			
Andre Kuenzli	100 m freestyle	58.77	35	Did not advance			
Andre Kuenzli	200 m medley	2:33.73	19	—N/a		Did not advance	

Women

Athlete	Event	Heat		Semifinal		Final	
Athlete	Event	Time	Rank	Time	Rank	Time	Rank
Ursula Kuenzli	50 m freestyle	30.75	37	Did not advance			
Ursula Kuenzli	100 m freestyle	1:07.32	32	Did not advance			
Ursula Kuenzli	50 m backstroke	38.25	23	Did not advance			
Ursula Kuenzli	100 m backstroke	1:22.64	21	Did not advance			

== Weightlifting ==
Men

Athlete	Event	Snatch		Clean & jerk		Total	Rank
Athlete	Event	Result	Rank	Result	Rank	Total	Rank
Obrie Nondo	56 kg	85	11	115	9	200	10
