= Boxing at the 2002 Commonwealth Games =

Boxing competitions

- Venue: Forum Centre, Manchester Arena
- Location: Manchester, England
- Dates: 25 July to 4 August 2002
- Competitors: 217 from 43 nations

Boxing at the 2002 Commonwealth Games was the 17th appearance of the Boxing at the Commonwealth Games. The events were held in Manchester, England, from 25 July to 4 August 2002 and featured contests in twelve weight classes.

The boxing events were held at the Forum Centre in the Manchester Evening News Arena.

Australia topped the boxing medal table by virtue of winning three gold medals.

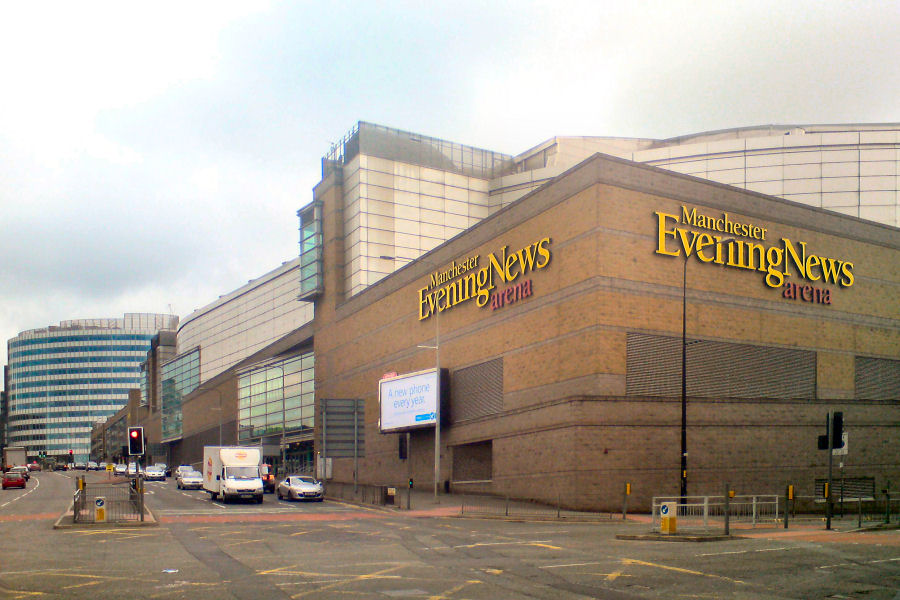
Manchester Arena David Dixon

== Competition schedule ==
P	Preliminary rounds	¼	Quarterfinals	½	Semifinals	F	Final

Date →	Fri 26	Sat 27	Sun 28	Mon 29	Tue 30	Wed 31	Thu 1	Fri 2	Sat 3
Light flyweight				P		¼	½		F
Flyweight	P		P			¼	½		F
Bantamweight	P	P			¼		½		F
Featherweight	P			P		¼	½		F
Lightweight		P	P		¼		½		F
Light welterweight		P	P		¼		½		F
Welterweight		P	P			¼	½		F
Light middleweight		P		P		¼	½		F
Middleweight				P		¼	½		F
Light heavyweight	P				¼		½		F
Heavyweight	P				¼		½		F
Super heavyweight	P				¼		½		F

== Participating nations ==
- Antigua and Barbuda (2)
- Australia (12)
- Bahamas (5)
- Barbados (2)
- Belize (1)
- Botswana (5)
- Cameroon (2)
- Canada (10)
- Cyprus (5)
- England (12)
- Fiji (2)
- Ghana (8)
- Grenada (2)
- Guyana (2)
- India (7)
- Jamaica (4)
- Kenya (4)
- Lesotho (8)
- Malawi (4)
- Malaysia (5)
- Mauritius (5)
- Mozambique (2)
- Namibia (5)
- New Zealand (4)
- Nigeria (12)
- Niue (1)
- Northern Ireland (10)
- Pakistan (3)
- Papua New Guinea (4)
- Samoa (4)
- Scotland (8)
- Seychelles (2)
- Sierra Leone (5)
- Solomon Islands (1)
- South Africa (6)
- Sri Lanka (4)
- Swaziland (4)
- Tanzania (6)
- Trinidad and Tobago (7)
- Uganda (4)
- Wales (11)
- Zambia (5)
- Zimbabwe (2)

== Medal summary ==
=== Medal table ===
* Host nation (England)

Rank	Nation	Gold	Silver	Bronze	Total
1	Australia	3	0	1	4
2	England*	2	3	2	7
3	Canada	2	2	3	7
4	Zambia	1	1	2	4
5	India	1	1	1	3
6	Nigeria	1	0	2	3
7	Wales	1	0	1	2
8	Pakistan	1	0	0	1
9	Uganda	0	2	0	2
10	South Africa	0	1	2	3
11	Botswana	0	1	1	2
12	Trinidad and Tobago	0	1	0	1
13	Namibia	0	0	2	2
13	New Zealand	0	0	2	2
13	Scotland	0	0	2	2
16	Barbados	0	0	1	1
16	Lesotho	0	0	1	1
16	Malaysia	0	0	1	1
Totals (18 entries)		12	12	24	48

=== Medallists ===
Event	Gold	Silver	Bronze
Light Flyweight	Mohammed Ali Qamar; India	Darran Langley; England	Taoreed Ajabe; Nigeria
Light Flyweight	Mohammed Ali Qamar; India	Darran Langley; England	Zamzai Azizi Mohamed; Malaysia
Flyweight	Kennedy Kanyanta; Zambia	Lechedzani Luza; Botswana	Sébastien Gauthier; Canada
Flyweight	Kennedy Kanyanta; Zambia	Lechedzani Luza; Botswana	Nzimeni Msutu; South Africa
Bantamweight	Justin Kane; Australia	Andrew Kooner; Canada	Ezekiel Letuka; Lesotho
Bantamweight	Justin Kane; Australia	Andrew Kooner; Canada	Mark Moran; England
Featherweight	Haider Ali; Pakistan	Som Bahadur Pun; India	Benoit Gaudet; Canada
Featherweight	Haider Ali; Pakistan	Som Bahadur Pun; India	Joshua Veikko; Namibia
Lightweight	Jamie Arthur; Wales	Denis Zimba; Zambia	Gilbert Khunwane; Botswana
Lightweight	Jamie Arthur; Wales	Denis Zimba; Zambia	Andy Morris; England
Light Welterweight	Darren Barker; England	Mohammed Kayongo; Uganda	Davidson Emenogu; Nigeria
Light Welterweight	Darren Barker; England	Mohammed Kayongo; Uganda	Davis Mwale; Zambia
Welterweight	Daniel Geale; Australia	Kwanele Zulu; South Africa	Danny Codling; New Zealand
Welterweight	Daniel Geale; Australia	Kwanele Zulu; South Africa	Paulus Ali Nuumbembe; Namibia
Light Middleweight	Jean Pascal; Canada	Paul Smith; England	Junior Greenidge; Barbados
Light Middleweight	Jean Pascal; Canada	Paul Smith; England	Craig McEwan; Scotland
Middleweight	Paul Miller; Australia	Steven Birch; England	Jitender Kumar; India
Middleweight	Paul Miller; Australia	Steven Birch; England	Michael Walchuk; Canada
Light heavyweight	Jegbefumere Albert; Nigeria	Joseph Lubega; Uganda	Ben McEachran; Australia
Light heavyweight	Jegbefumere Albert; Nigeria	Joseph Lubega; Uganda	Daniel Venter; South Africa
Heavyweight	Jason Douglas; Canada	Kertson Manswell; Trinidad and Tobago	Shane Cameron; New Zealand
Heavyweight	Jason Douglas; Canada	Kertson Manswell; Trinidad and Tobago	Andrew Young; Scotland
Super Heavyweight	David Dolan; England	David Cadieux; Canada	Gozie Dijeh; Zambia
Super Heavyweight	David Dolan; England	David Cadieux; Canada	Kevin Evans; Wales

== Results ==
=== Light-flyweight 48kg ===
Round	Winner	Loser	Score
Preliminary	(England) Darran Langley	(Northern Ireland) Paul Baker	24:19
Preliminary	(Malaysia) Zamzadi Azizi Bin Mohd	(Fiji) Taslim Shah	RSCO 2
Preliminary	(Namibia) Joseph Jermia	(Cyprus) Roudik Kazandzhyan	39:20
Preliminary	(India) Mohammed Ali Qamar	(Kenya) Suleiman Bilali	RSCI 2
Preliminary	(Lesotho) Sebusiso Keketsi	(Australia) Romesh Fernando	RSCO 2
Preliminary	(South Africa) Phumzile Matyhila	(Papua New Guinea) Jack Willie	RSCO 1
Preliminary	(Nigeria) Taoreed Ajagbe	(Sri Lanka) Nayanajith Alexander	21:16
Quarter-Final	(England) Darran Langley	(Ghana) Joseph Martey	23:8
Quarter-Final	(Malaysia) Zamzadi Azizi Bin Mohd	(Namibia) Joseph Jermia	15:14
Quarter-Final	(India) Mohammed Ali Qamar	(Lesotho) Sebusiso Keketsi	RSCO 2
Quarter-Final	(Nigeria) Taoreed Ajagbe	(South Africa) Phumzile Matyhila	14:11
Semi-Final	(England) Darran Langley	(Malaysia) Zamzadi Azizi Bin Mohd	19:18
Semi-Final	(India) Mohammed Ali Qamar	(Nigeria) Taoreed Ajagbe	27:13
Final	(India) Mohammed Ali Qamar	(England) Darran Langley	27:25

=== Flyweight 51kg ===
Round	Winner	Loser	Score
Extra preliminary	(Nigeria) Sunday Michael	(Tanzania) Rajab Omary Mbwana	19:8
Extra preliminary	(Kenya) Bernard Ngumba	(Papua New Guinea) Raphael Lare	18:16
Extra preliminary	(Sri Lanka) Anurudha Rathnayake	(Australia) Bradley Hore	14:7
Extra preliminary	(Canada) Sebastien Gauthier	(Northern Ireland) Liam Cunningham	30:11
Extra preliminary	(Lesotho) Emanuel Nketu	(India) Dalvir Singh	23:14
Preliminary	(Uganda) Martin Mubiru	(The Bahamas) Shimon Bain	KO 2
Preliminary	(South Africa) Nzimeni Msutu	(England) Matthew Marsh	KO 2
Preliminary	(Malaysia) Rahib Ahmad	(Malawi) Wilson Masamba	23:7
Preliminary	(Botswana) Lechedzani Luza	(Eswatini) Jabulani Gina	RSC 2
Preliminary	(Mauritius) Bruno Julie	(Nigeria) Sunday Michael	27:17
Preliminary	(Zambia) Kennedy Kanyanta	(Wales) Matthew Edmonds	RSCO 2
Preliminary	(Sri Lanka) Anurudha Rathnayake	(Kenya) Bernard Ngumba Irungu	RSCH 1
Preliminary	(Canada) Sebastien Gauthier	(Lesotho) Emanuel Nketu	RSC 2
Quarter-Final	(South Africa) Nzimeni Msutu	(Uganda) Martin Mubiru	48:35
Quarter-Final	(Botswana) Lechedzani Luza	(Malaysia) Rahib Ahmad	DQ 4
Quarter-Final	(Zambia) Kennedy Kanyanta	(Mauritius) Bruno Julie	30:21
Quarter-Final	(Canada) Sebastien Gauthier	(Sri Lanka) Anurudha Rathnayake	28:19
Semi-Final	(Botswana) Lechedzani Luza	(South Africa) Nzimeni Msutu	34:23
Semi-Final	(Zambia) Kennedy Kanyanta	(Canada) Sebastien Gauthier	34:26
Final	(Zambia) Kennedy Kanyanta	(Botswana) Lechedzani Luza	25:12

=== Bantamweight 54kg ===
Round	Winner	Loser	Score
Extra preliminary	(Canada) Andrew Kooner	(Mauritius) Riaz Durgahed	22:6
Extra preliminary	(Lesotho) Ezekiel Letuka	(India) Dingko Singh	14:12
Extra preliminary	(Nigeria) Shehu Memud	(Zimbabwe) Fernando Tom	RSCH 2
Extra preliminary	(Wales) Darren Edwards	(Botswana) Khumiso Ikgopoleng	24:8
Extra preliminary	(South Africa) Ludumo Galada	(Trinidad and Tobago) Michel Agard	20:6
Preliminary	(England) Mark Moran	(Kenya) David Munyasia	22:18
Preliminary	(Northern Ireland) Martin Lindsay	(Sri Lanka) Manju Wanjarachchi	26:20
Preliminary	(Tanzania) Emilian Patrick	(Malawi) Kenneth Chinthenga	RSCO 2
Preliminary	(Australia) Justin Kane	(Ghana) Jonathan Yartey	RSCO 3
Preliminary	(Canada) Andrew Kooner	(Sierra Leone) Franklyn Mayei	RSCO 2
Preliminary	(Lesotho) Ezekiel Letuka	(Nigeria) Shehu Memud	21:19
Preliminary	(Eswatini) Thokozani Masuku	(Fiji) Gyanendra Kumar Singh	37:19
Preliminary	(South Africa) Ludumo Galada	(Wales) Darren Edwards	+12:12
Quarter-Final	(England) Mark Moran	(Northern Ireland) Martin Lindsay	RSCO 2
Quarter-Final	(Australia) Justin Kane	(Tanzania) Emilian Patrick	RSCO 1
Quarter-Final	(Canada) Andrew Kooner	(Eswatini) Thokozani Masuku	KO 2
Quarter-Final	(Lesotho) Ezekiel Letuka	(South Africa) Ludumo Galada	31:30
Semi-Final	(Australia) Justin Kane	(England) Mark Moran	26:24
Semi-Final	(Canada) Andrew Kooner	(Lesotho) Ezekiel Letuka	37:29
Final	(Australia) Justin Kane	(Canada) Andrew Kooner	+34:34

=== Featherweight 57kg ===
Round	Winner	Loser	Score
Extra preliminary	(Canada) Benoit Gaudet	(Sri Lanka) Nilantha Walisundara	22:8
Extra preliminary	(Zambia) Jonathan Mwila	(Ghana) Thomas Aryeetey	19:18
Extra preliminary	(Pakistan) Haider Ali	(Mauritius) Michael Medor	12:10
Extra preliminary	(Wales) Peter Ashton	(Northern Ireland) Kevin O'Hara	24:7
Extra preliminary	(Lesotho) Thandi Ntjona	(Guyana) Rudolph Fraser	12:11
Extra preliminary	(Uganda) Dennis Mwanje	(Seychelles) Kitson Julie	RSCH 3
Preliminary	(Tanzania) Petro Mtagwa	(Papua New Guinea) Ben Tami Jr	RSC 2
Preliminary	(Namibia) Joshua Veikko	(Australia) Greg Eadie	31:26
Preliminary	(Botswana) Leslie Sekotswe	(Cyprus) Ovidiu Bobîrnat	w/o
Preliminary	(India) Som Bahadur Pun	(Nigeria) Abolore Madoti	RSCO 3
Preliminary	(England) Stephen Bell	(Trinidad and Tobago) Devon Jones	RSCO 2
Preliminary	(Canada) Benoit Gaudet	(Zambia) Jonathan Mwila	RSCO 2
Preliminary	(Pakistan) Haider Ali	(Wales) Peter Ashton	25:14
Preliminary	(Uganda) Dennis Mwanje	(Lesotho) Thandi Ntjona	RSC 2
Quarter-Final	(Namibia) Joshua Veikko	(Tanzania) Petro Mtagwa	29:17
Quarter-Final	(India) Som Bahadur Pun	(Botswana) Leslie Sekotswe	35:29
Quarter-Final	(Canada) Benoit Gaudet	(England) Stephen Bell	18:15
Quarter-Final	(Pakistan) Haider Ali	(Uganda) Dennis Mwanje	20:7
Semi-Final	(India) Som Bahadur Pun	(Namibia) Joshua Veikko	RSCO 3
Semi-Final	(Pakistan) Haider Ali	(Canada) Benoit Gaudet	16:7
Final	(Pakistan) Haider Ali	(India) Som Bahadur Pun	28:10

=== Lightweight 60kg ===
Round	Winner	Loser	Score
Extra preliminary	(England) Andy Morris	(Jamaica) Courtney Harvey	RSCO 3
Extra preliminary	(India) Reji Ramanand	(Trinidad and Tobago) Jules De Gannes	RSCO 3
Extra preliminary	(Lesotho) Koloba Sehloho	(Ghana) King Abbey	24:16
Extra preliminary	(Wales) Jamie Arthur	(Scotland) Mark Hastie	21:12
Extra preliminary	(Canada) Antonin Décarie	(Seychelles) Jean-Paul Mellie	26:10
Extra preliminary	(Malaysia) Adnan Yusoh	(Cyprus) Polydoros Polydorou	RSCI 3
Extra preliminary	(Mozambique) Justino Miambo	(Australia) Allan Luxford	20:15
Extra preliminary	(Namibia) Nicanor Natangwe	(Eswatini) Musa Simelane	RSCH 2
Extra preliminary	(Samoa) Sada Wulf	(Papua New Guinea) Henry Kungsi	35:20
Extra preliminary	(Botswana) Gilbert Khunwane	(Netherlands Antilles) Dorian Allen	RSCO 2
Preliminary	(Mauritius) Giovanni Frontin	(Tanzania) Karim Matumla	32:27
Preliminary	(Zambia) Denis Zimba	(Grenada) Kennis Joseph	25:16
Preliminary	(Nigeria) Saheed Adigun Salawu	(Belize) Joseph Eagan	RSC
Preliminary	(England) Andy Morris	(India) Reji Ramanand	29:16
Preliminary	(Wales) Jamie Arthur	(Lesotho) Koloba Sehloho	20:9
Preliminary	(Malaysia) Adnan Yusoh	(Canada) Antonin Décarie	22:15
Preliminary	(Namibia) Nicanor Natangwe	(Mozambique) Justino Miambo	24:16
Preliminary	(Botswana) Gilbert Khunwane	(Samoa) Sada Wulf	32:19
Quarter-Final	(Zambia) Denis Zimba	(Mauritius) Giovanni Frontin	29:28
Quarter-Final	(England) Andy Morris	(Nigeria) Saheed Adigun Salawu	RSCO 2
Quarter-Final	(Wales) Jamie Arthur	(Malaysia) Adnan Yusoh	RSCO 2
Quarter-Final	(Botswana) Gilbert Khunwane	(Namibia) Nicanor Natangwe	27:16
Semi-Final	(Zambia) Denis Zimba	(England) Andy Morris	26:22
Semi-Final	(Wales) Jamie Arthur	(Botswana) Gilbert Khunwane	31:28
Final	(Wales) Jamie Arthur	(Zambia) Denis Zimba	37:35

=== Light-welterweight 63.5kg ===
Round	Winner	Loser	Score
Extra Preliminary	(Ghana) Emmanuel Lartey	(Namibia) Jason Nuele	25:15
Extra Preliminary	(England) Darren Barker	(Northern Ireland) Paul McCloskey	20:15
Extra Preliminary	(Jamaica) Sheldon Rudolph	(New Zealand) Daniel Headifen	+20:20
Extra Preliminary	(Cyprus) Ionas Hristodoulou	(Lesotho) Tsepe Matete	KO 2
Extra Preliminary	(Nigeria) Davidson Emenogu	(Malaysia) Mohamad Zainudin	RSCO 3
Extra Preliminary	(Canada) Roberto Romero	(Eswatini) Ndumiso Bonginkhis Zwane	RSCO 2
Extra Preliminary	(Scotland) Kevin Anderson	(Pakistan) Asghar Ali Shah	29:18
Preliminary	(Zambia) Davis Mwale	(Tanzania) Julius William	RSCO 3
Preliminary	(Australia) Jarrod Fletcher	(Botswana) Dintwa Sloca	17:13
Preliminary	(Uganda) Mohamed Kayongo	(Samoa) Vaiavea Tausaga	RSC 1
Preliminary	(Ghana) Emmanuel Lartey	(Trinidad and Tobago) Michael Springer	RSCH 2
Preliminary	(England) Darren Barker	(Jamaica) Sheldon Rudolph	RSCO 3
Preliminary	(Nigeria) Davidson Emenogu	(Cyprus) Ionas Hristodoulou	20:14
Preliminary	(Scotland) Kevin Anderson	(Canada) Roberto Romero	38:20
Quarter-Final	(Zambia) Davis Mwale	(Wales) Vivian Bryan	RSC 4
Quarter-Final	(Uganda) Mohamed Kayongo	(Australia) Jarrod Fletcher	25:22
Quarter-Final	(England) Darren Barker	(Ghana) Emmanuel Lartey	24:8
Quarter-Final	(Nigeria) Davidson Emenogu	(Scotland) Kevin Anderson	40:23
Semi-Final	(Uganda) Mohamed Kayongo	(Zambia) Davis Mwale	28:22
Semi-Final	(Uganda) Darren Barker	(Nigeria) Davidson Emenogu	w/o
Final	(England) Darren Barker	(Uganda) Mohamed Kayongo	18:14

=== Welterweight 67kg ===
Round	Winner	Loser	Score
Extra preliminary	(England) Daniel Happe	(Canada) Ryan Savage	23:6
Preliminary	(Sierra Leone) Tony Cesay	(Malaysia) Shuhari Hussain	26:9
Preliminary	(Australia) Daniel Geale	(Jamaica) Tsetsi Davis	RSCO 3
Preliminary	(New Zealand) Danny Codling	(Zimbabwe) Victor Masunga	RSCO 2
Preliminary	(Nigeria) Olanrewaju Ekundayo	(The Bahamas) Taureano Johnson	20:15
Preliminary	(South Africa) Kwanele Zulu	(Northern Ireland) Gary McClure	RSCO 1
Preliminary	(Scotland) Colin McNeil	(Kenya) Absolom Okoth	+30:30
Preliminary	(Namibia) Paulus Nuumbebme	(Lesotho) Lohlohonolo Snyman	RSCO 3
Preliminary	(Wales) Tony Doherty	(England) Daniel Happe	33:22
Quarter-Final	(Australia) Daniel Geale	(Sierra Leone) Tony Cesay	25:13
Quarter-Final	(New Zealand) Danny Codling	(Nigeria) Olanrewaju Ekundayo	37:24
Quarter-Final	(South Africa) Kwanele Zulu	(Scotland) Colin McNeil	RSCO 2
Quarter-Final	(Namibia) Paulus Nuumbebme	(Wales) Tony Doherty	RSCI 1
Semi-Final	(Australia) Daniel Geale	(New Zealand) Danny Codling	27:13
Semi-Final	(South Africa) Kwanele Zulu	(Namibia) Paulus Nuumbebme	39:30
Final	(Australia) Daniel Geale	(South Africa) Kwanele Zulu	26:17

=== Light-middleweight 71kg ===
Round	Winner	Loser	Score
Extra preliminary	(Ghana) Thomas Awimbono	(Trinidad and Tobago) Anthony St.Clair	19:??
Extra preliminary	(Cameroon) Foster Nkodo	(Northern Ireland) Gerard McAuley	19:18
Extra preliminary	(England) Paul Smith	(Wales) Lee Jones	RSCO 3
Preliminary	(Barbados) Junior Greenidge	(New Zealand) Kahukura Bentson	31:25
Preliminary	(Cyprus) Savas Kokkinos	(The Bahamas) Anthony Major	31:29
Preliminary	(Australia) Jamie Pittman	(Tanzania) Hassan Mraba Mzonge	RSCO 3
Preliminary	(Canada) Jean Pascal	(Lesotho) Ulric Caramba-Coker	RSCH 2
Preliminary	(Scotland) Craig McEwen	(Sierra Leone) Mosolesa Tsie	RSCO 2
Preliminary	(South Africa) Khotso Godfrey Motau	(Nigeria) Aziz Olumegbon	RSCO 3
Preliminary	(Ghana) Thomas Awimbono	(Samoa) Alema Vaele	RSCO 3
Preliminary	(England) Paul Smith	(Cameroon) Foster Nkodo	RSCO 3
Quarter-Final	(Barbados) Junior Greenidge	(Cyprus) Savas Kokkinos	35:25
Quarter-Final	(Canada) Jean Pascal	(Australia) Jamie Pittman	20:14
Quarter-Final	(Scotland) Craig McEwen	(South Africa) Khotso Godfrey Motau	16:1
Quarter-Final	(England) Paul Smith	(Ghana) Thomas Awimbono	21:17
Semi-Final	(Canada) Jean Pascal	(Barbados) Junior Greenidge	RSCO 2
Semi-Final	(England) Paul Smith	(Scotland) Craig McEwen	20:19
Final	(Canada) Jean Pascal	(England) Paul Smith	18:16

=== Middleweight 75kg ===
Round	Winner	Loser	Score
Preliminary	(India) Jitender Kumar	(Sierra Leone) Joseph Farmer	KO 1
Preliminary	(Nigeria) Murtala Abdulsalam	(Ghana) Ernest Amuzu	RSCI 1
Preliminary	(England) Steven Birch	(Northern Ireland) Conall Carmichael	32:21
Preliminary	(Scotland) Steven McGuire	(Trinidad and Tobago) Simeon Prince	RSCO 3
Preliminary	(Wales) Mike Allen	(Solomon Islands) Warren Pugeva	RSCO 2
Preliminary	(Canada) Michael Walchuk	(Mozambique) Joao Ferreira	RSCO 2
Preliminary	(Australia) Paul Miller	(Zambia) Derrick Fimbo	RSCO 2
Preliminary	(The Bahamas) Jermaine Mackey	(Samoa) Lualima Tokiana	KO 3
Quarter-Final	(India) Jitender Kumar	(Nigeria) Murtala Abdulsalam	16:14
Quarter-Final	(England) Steven Birch	(Scotland) Steven McGuire	33:20
Quarter-Final	(Canada) Michael Walchuk	(Wales) Mike Allen	34:21
Quarter-Final	(Australia) Paul Miller	(The Bahamas) Jermaine Mackey	RSCO 2
Semi-Final	(England) Steven Birch	(India) Jitender Kumar	32:23
Semi-Final	(Australia) Paul Miller	(Canada) Michael Walchuk	+25:25
Final	(Australia) Paul Miller	(England) Steven Birch	20:14

=== Light-heavyweight 81kg ===
Round	Winner	Loser	Score
Preliminary	(South Africa) Danie Venter	(Scotland) Lee Ramsay	22:4
Preliminary	(Barbados) Shawn Cox	(Malawi) Pascal Simwaza	RSC 2
Preliminary	(Nigeria) Jegbefumere Albert	(Sierra Leone) David Kowah	RSC 2
Preliminary	(England) Courtney Fry	(Cameroon) Bertrand Tietsia	23:9
Quarter-Final	(Uganda) Joseph Lubega	(Netherlands Antilles) Gavin Clersaint	RSCH 1
Quarter-Final	(Australia) Ben McEachran	(Wales) James Whitfield	27:18
Quarter-Final	(South Africa) Danie Venter	(Barbados) Shawn Cox	34:25
Quarter-Final	(Nigeria) Jegbefumere Albert	(England) Courtney Fry	27:22
Semi-Final	(Uganda) Joseph Lubega	(Australia) Ben McEachran	RSCI 2
Semi-Final	(Nigeria) Jegbefumere Albert	(South Africa) Danie Venter	30:18
Final	(Nigeria) Jegbefumere Albert	(Uganda) Joseph Lubega	16:8

=== Heavyweight 91kg ===
Round	Winner	Loser	Score
Preliminary	(Trinidad and Tobago) Kertson Manswell	(Australia) Michael Ninness	9:4
Preliminary	(Jamaica) Kerron Speid	(Northern Ireland) Shane Curran	5:0 (J)
Preliminary	(New Zealand) Shane Cameron	(Nigeria) Solomon Ataga	RSC 2
Preliminary	(England) David Haye	(Pakistan) Shoukat Ali	RSCO 3
Preliminary	(Canada) Jason Douglas	(Ghana) Theophilus Blue	RSC 2
Quarter-Final	(Scotland) Andrew Young	(Wales) Lee Milsjen	RSC 1
Quarter-Final	(Trinidad and Tobago) Kertson Manswell	(Ghana) Charles Quartey	22:18
Quarter-Final	(New Zealand) Shane Cameron	(Jamaica) Kerron Speid	42:23
Quarter-Final	(Canada) Jason Douglas	(England) David Haye	w/o
Semi-Final	(Trinidad and Tobago) Kertson Manswell	(Scotland) Andrew Young	20:6
Semi-Final	(Canada) Jason Douglas	(New Zealand) Shane Cameron	RSCO 2
Final	(Canada) Jason Douglas	(Trinidad and Tobago) Kertson Manswell	20:13

=== Super Heavyweight +91kg ===
Round	Winner	Loser	Score
Preliminary	(England) David Dolan	(The Bahamas) Jerry Butler	RSC 2
Preliminary	(Niue) Star Tauasi	(Australia) David Turner	RSC 2
Preliminary	(Wales) Kevin Evans	(Northern Ireland) Cathal McMonagle	24:9
Preliminary	(Mauritius) Michael Macaque	(India) Harpal Singh	20:18
Quarter-Final	(Canada) David Cadieux	(Grenada) Sebastian Stiell	RSCO 2
Quarter-Final	(Nigeria) Dijeh Gozie	(Scotland) Ian Millarvie	26:24
Quarter-Final	(England) David Dolan	(Niue) Star Tauasi	RSCO 2
Quarter-Final	(Wales) Kevin Evans	(Mauritius) Michael Macaque	19:9
Semi-Final	(Canada) David Cadieux	(Nigeria) Dijeh Gozie	33:19
Semi-Final	(England) David Dolan	(Wales) Kevin Evans	RSCI 1
Final	(England) David Dolan	(Canada) David Cadieux	27:20

== See also ==
- Boxing at the Commonwealth Games
