= Athletics at the 2002 Commonwealth Games – Men's 800 metres =

Men's 800 metres at the 2002 Commonwealth Games
- Venue: City of Manchester Stadium
- Dates: 26 July 2002 (heats); 27 July 2002 (semi finals); 28 July 2002 (final)
- Competitors: 27 from 21 nations
- Winning time: 1:46.32

Medalists
gold medal	Mbulaeni Mulaudzi	South Africa
silver medal	Joseph Mutua	Kenya
bronze medal	Kris McCarthy	Australia

Official Video

The men's 800 metres event at the 2002 Commonwealth Games took place between 27 and 29 July at the City of Manchester Stadium in Manchester, England. Mbulaeni Mulaudzi won the gold medal with a time of 1:46.32 giving South Africa its first victory in the event. Kenyan Joseph Mutua placed second, taking the silver medal in 1:46.57. He finished ahead of Kris McCarthy of Australia who won the bronze.

This was the ninth running of the 800 metres event at the Commonwealth Games after converting to metric at the 1970 Edinburgh Games. An 880 yards event was contested between 1930 and 1966. 27 competitors from 21 nations entered the event. The champion from Kuala Lumpur, Japheth Kimutai was unable to defend his title finishing fifth in the final. Whilst the silver medallist in both 1994 and 1998, South African Hezekiél Sepeng, failed to arrive in Manchester for the Games after sustaining a hamstring injury.

== Records ==
Prior to this competition, the existing records were as follows:

Records before the 2002 Commonwealth Games
Record	Time (s)	Athlete (nation)	Meet	Location	Date	Ref
World record	1:41.11	Wilson Kipketer (DEN)	Weltklasse in Köln	Cologne, Germany	24 August 1997	
Commonwealth record	1:41.73	Sebastian Coe (GBR)		Florence, Italy	10 June 1981	
Games record	1:43.22	Steve Cram (ENG)	Commonwealth Games	Edinburgh, Scotland	31 July 1986	

== Results ==
=== Heats ===
The heats were held on 27 July, starting at 11:10 in the morning.

Qualification Rules: First 3 in each heat (Q) and the best 4 of remaining athletes (q) advance to the semi finals.

==== Heat 1 ====
Results of heat 1
Rank	Athlete	Nation	Time	Notes
1	Otukile Lekote	Botswana	1:47.68	Q
2	Paskar Owor	Uganda	1:47.87	Q, SB
3	Nathan Brannen	Canada	1:48.04	Q
4	Prince Mumba	Zambia	1:48.40	q, PB
5	Sherridan Kirk	Trinidad and Tobago	1:48.51	q
6	Nickie Peters	Saint Vincent and the Grenadines	1:52.73	

==== Heat 2 ====
Results of heat 2
Rank	Athlete	Nation	Time	Notes
1	Joseph Mutua	Kenya	1:48.53	Q
2	Kris McCarthy	Australia	1:48.85	Q
3	Neil Speaight	England	1:49.67	Q
4	Constantinos Hadjimarkou	Cyprus	1:51.26	
5	Clive Baron	Dominica	1:59.48	
	Ebrima Ceesay	The Gambia	DQ	
	Clement Abai	Papua New Guinea	DNS	

==== Heat 3 ====
Results of heat 3
Rank	Athlete	Nation	Time	Notes
1	Japheth Kimutai	Kenya	1:49.62	Q
2	Zach Whitmarsh	Canada	1:49.92	Q
3	Glody Dube	Botswana	1:50.16	Q
4	Curtis Robb	England	1:50.34	
5	Amilcar Leal	Mozambique	1:50.85	
6	Marvin Watts	Jamaica	1:51.39	
7	Daryl Vassallo	Gibraltar	1:57.66	

==== Heat 4 ====
Results of heat 4
Rank	Athlete	Nation	Time	Notes
1	Mbulaeni Mulaudzi	South Africa	1:49.08	Q
2	James McIlroy	Northern Ireland	1:49.21	Q
3	Joel Kidger	England	1:49.47	Q
4	Matthew Shone	Wales	1:49.67	q
5	Isireli Naikelekelevesi	Fiji	1:50.01	q
6	Sylvester Chishiba	Zambia	1:50.86	PB
7	Dauda Manasary	Sierra Leone	2:04.59	

=== Semi finals ===
The semi finals were held on 28 July, starting at 18:45 in the evening.

Qualification: First 3 of each heat (Q) and the next 2 fastest (q) qualified for the final.

==== Semi final 1 ====
Results of semi final 1
Rank	Athlete	Nation	Time	Notes
1	Joseph Mutua	Kenya	1:46.43	Q
2	Otukile Lekote	Botswana	1:46.65	Q
3	James McIlroy	Northern Ireland	1:46.93	Q,
4	Paskar Owor	Uganda	1:47.14	q, SB
5	Nathan Brannen	Canada	1:47.65	
6	Joel Kidger	England	1:48.12	PB
7	Matthew Shone	Wales	1:49.08	
8	Isireli Naikelekelevesi	Fiji	1:50.00	

==== Semi final 2 ====
Results of semi final 2
Rank	Athlete	Nation	Time	Notes
1	Mbulaeni Mulaudzi	South Africa	1:46.72	Q
2	Japheth Kimutai	Kenya	1:46.81	Q
3	Kris McCarthy	Australia	1:47.06	Q
4	Glody Dube	Botswana	1:47.19	q
5	Neil Speaight	England	1:47.22	
6	Sherridan Kirk	Trinidad and Tobago	1:47.98	
7	Prince Mumba	Zambia	1:48.51	
8	Zach Whitmarsh	Canada	1:49.61	

=== Final ===
The final was held at 20:24 on 29 July.

Results of the final
Rank	Athlete	Nation	Time	Notes
1st place, gold medalist(s)	Mbulaeni Mulaudzi	South Africa	1:46.32	
2nd place, silver medalist(s)	Joseph Mutua	Kenya	1:46.57	
3rd place, bronze medalist(s)	Kris McCarthy	Australia	1:46.79	
4	Otukile Lekote	Botswana	1:47.04	
5	Japheth Kimutai	Kenya	1:47.46	
6	James McIlroy	Northern Ireland	1:47.77	
7	Paskar Owor	Uganda	1:48.96	
8	Glody Dube	Botswana	2:17.40	
