= Jamie Arthur =

Welsh boxer

Personal information
- Nationality: British
- Born: Jamie Arthur; 17 December 1979 (age 46) Aberdeen
- Height: 5 ft 9 in (1.75 m)
- Weight: Super bantamweight

Boxing career
- Stance: Orthodox

Boxing record
- Total fights: 25
- Wins: 19
- Win by KO: 4
- Losses: 6
- Draws: 0
Medal record
Representing Wales
Men's boxing
Commonwealth Games
Gold medal – first place	2002 Manchester	Lightweight

Jamie Arthur (born 17 December 1979) is a former professional boxer. Born in Scotland, Arthur moved to Wales at a young age and took up boxing. He was selected to represent Wales at the 2002 Commonwealth Games in Manchester in the men's lightweight division. After winning his opening four bouts, Arthur defeated Denis Zimba in the gold medal match to become the first Welsh fighter to win gold at the games for more than 40 years.

He turned professional in 2003 and won his first nine bouts, but persistent cut injuries and two consecutive defeats led to his retirement in 2005. He returned to boxing in 2008 and won the Welsh area super-featherweight title in his second fight before progressing to an unsuccessful British title fight against Martin Lindsay. He competed in the Prizefighter series in May 2010 at super-bantamweight but was eliminated in the semi-final.

In May 2010, he won the vacant Commonwealth super-bantamweight title after defeating Kris Taylor, but lost the belt in his first defence against Jason Booth. He fought Scott Quigg in 2012 but suffered a stoppage defeat. He fought once more in 2015 before retiring, ending his career with a record of 19 wins (4 by knockout) and 6 defeats.

== Early life and Commonwealth title ==
Arthur was born in Aberdeen in Scotland to Betty and Gordon Arthur. The family moved to Wales when Arthur was four years old and he grew up in Cwmbran. He took up boxing after being bullied by a group of boys who lived in his street and began attending a local gym near his school from the age of nine. After six weeks, his coach convinced him to take up the sport on a permanent basis after praising his ability; Arthur credits this praise as helping improve his confidence and communication skills. He was also a keen footballer as a child and represented Wales at schoolboy level before giving up the game to devote his time to his boxing career.

He was named in the Welsh boxing squad for the 2002 Commonwealth Games in Manchester in the lightweight division, while still working as a scaffolder. He defeated Scotland's Mark Hastie and Lesotho's Koloba Sehloho in the opening rounds on points before stopping Adnan Jusoh of Malaysia in the quarter-final. Arthur overcame Jusoh in two rounds after moving 15 points ahead on the judges' scorecard which results in an immediate stoppage in an amateur bout. In the semi-final, Arthur faced Botswanan Gilbert Khunwane and suffered a cut to his face that required two stoppages to wipe blood from his eyes. He went on to win the bout 31–28 on points and left the ring immediately to receive stitches for his injury.

In the final, he met Zambian Denis Zimba at the Manchester Arena. Ahead of the bout, there were doubts over whether Arthur would be able to compete due to the cut he had sustained in his semi-final, but he was eventually cleared by a doctor one hour before the fight was due to start. Arthur struggled in the opening two rounds of the bout before gaining control in the third round to establish a three-point lead. He later remarked that his plan was to score as many points as he could quickly in case the referee stopped the fight due to his injury. A close final round saw Arthur retain his lead and win the gold medal, becoming the first Welshman to win Commonwealth gold in 44 years since Howard Winstone at the 1958 Games.

== Professional career ==
=== Early bouts and first retirement ===
Arthur turned professional in 2003 with promoter Frank Warren, having initially made plans to continue fighting as an amateur in order to compete at the 2004 Summer Olympics in Athens. Arthur commented that the lack of funding provided by the Welsh Amateur Boxing Association (WABA) had influenced his decision, although this was rebutted by the organisation's chairman. Fighting out of a Penarth-based gym, he made his professional debut at lightweight in March by defeating Daniel Thorpe on a points decision over four rounds at the Braehead Arena in Glasgow. Three months later he recorded his second victory by defeating James Gorman on points despite his opponent weighing more than half a stone (7 lb (3.2 kg)) heavier.

Arthur won a further four bouts in the final four months of 2003 after returning to original trainer Chris Manley of the Coed Eva club after his second bout. He stopped three opponents before defeating Jus Wallie on points in December. He was due to fight Mger Mkrtchyan in February 2004 but was forced to withdraw after a cut he had sustained in his victory over Wallie, which had required 15 stitches, had been slow to heal. Instead, his next bout was a points victory over Kris Taylor in late March. In July 2004, Arthur faced a significantly more experienced opponent in former French super-bantamweight champion Frederic Bonifai. He defeated Bonifai on points and recorded a similar victory over Buster Dennis two months later.

In January 2005, Arthur met Haider Ali after a four-month break due to sustaining another cut. He suffered his first professional defeat after the referee stopped the bout due to a severe cut that Arthur had sustained from a clash of heads. In a bid to stop the recurring cut issues, Arthur hoped to undergo surgery to fix the problem but was told that the operation would not be a success. Arthur returned in July 2005 working under new coach Enzo Calzaghe, but suffered a second consecutive defeat against Harry Ramogaodi after being knocked down three times despite breaking his opponents' jaw during the bout. His defeat led to him being released from his contract with Warren's promotion company. In September 2005, Arthur announced his retirement from boxing at the age of 25 due to his ongoing cut issues and having struggled to support his family financially. He commented "the enjoyment hasn't been there for the last 18 months, so when you're not enjoying something it's time to make a change" and announced plans to become an amateur trainer.

=== Return to boxing ===
Arthur opened an amateur gym in Newport in 2007 and worked as a trainer for 18 months. He announced a return fight for April 2008 against Ghanaian Mettle Ayitey. Arthur dominated the fight to record his first victory since 2004 and stated that his ultimate aim on returning was to secure a British title. During his second fight on his return, in July of the same year, Arthur stopped Dai Davies in the second round of their bout to win the Welsh super-featherweight title. His comeback was briefly derailed when he suffered a broken finger in training shortly afterwards and was forced to pull out of a fight against Riaz Durgahed in Bristol, but he returned in November to defeat Steve Gethin on points.

He began 2009 with victories over Youssef al-Hamidi and Andrey Kostin in February and March respectively. His five-fight winning streak resulted in him facing undefeated Akaash Bhatia in an eliminator to become the number one contender for the British title. The 10-round fight finished with Arthur being named the winner by a single point and was later nominated for the British fight of the year award. Arthur secured a British featherweight title fight against unbeaten Martin Lindsay following his victory over Bhatia. As a warm-up bout for the contest, Arthur defeated Englishman Mickey Coveney on points at the Newport Centre, despite separating from trainer Eddie Avoth only eight days before the fight. Against Lindsay, Arthur lost the bout by unanimous decision after being knocked down twice and suffering a cut in the 11th round.

Arthur had pledged to retire from the sport if he lost his British title fight, but in May 2010 he was offered the chance to join the Prizefighter series, a knockout tournament organised by Sky Sports consisting of three-round bouts held on the same night, at super bantamweight. He joined the competition with only 12 days notice to replace the injured Craig Lyon. He defeated Robbie Turley in his quarter-final before losing to the undefeated Ricky Owen in the semi-final.

=== Commonwealth title and retirement ===
Despite his defeat, Arthur credited the Prizefighter series with inspiring him to fight again, dropping to super-bantamweight permanently. He was named as a surprise contender for the vacant Commonwealth super-bantamweight title against the undefeated Kris Taylor. Arthur was deducted two points during the bout for low blows and suffered a cut, but still went on to win a points decision to claim his first major title. His reign as champion was short-lived as he lost in his first defence to Jason Booth in February 2011 in a split decision. Despite being offered a rematch, Arthur initially chose to retire from boxing for a second time. In 2012, he came out of retirement to fight Scott Quigg for the British Super-bantamweight belt after Rendall Munroe turned down the bout. Arthur caused a surprise by knocking the unbeaten Quigg down in the fourth round, however the referee called a halt to the fight after Quigg landed several heavy body blows to Arthur in the eighth round. Arthur was upset with the stoppage, stating that the shots had caught him off balance and he was fine to continue.

Arthur retired again after the bout, opening his own gym in Rhydyfelin in Pontypridd and coaching Newport-based fighter Bradley Pryce. Arthur made a brief return in 2015 to fight Antonio Horvatic at the Newport Centre. He returned again hoping to challenge for a British title and defeated Horvatic on points. He was forced to withdraw from a bout in early 2016, never fighting at a professional level again.

== Personal life ==
Alongside his boxing career, Arthur enrolled on a sports studies course through the University of Wales in 2003. His wife Karen is a horse trainer and Arthur has often trained alongside the animals when preparing for fights. After retiring from fighting, Arthur became a personal trainer. He also briefly managed fighter Kieran Gething.

== Professional boxing record ==
Professional boxing record
25 fights	19 wins	6 losses
By knockout	4	3
By decision	15	3
Draws	0	

Boxing record
No.	Result	Record	Opponent	Type	Round	Date	Location	Notes
1	Win	1–0	Daniel Thorpe	PTS	4	22 March 2003	Braehead Arena, Glasgow, Scotland	
2	Win	2–0	James Gorman	PTS	4	28 June 2003	Cardiff International Arena, Cardiff, Wales	
3	Win	3–0	Dave Hinds	RTD	1 (4)	13 September 2003	Newport Centre, Newport, Wales	
4	Win	4–0	Dafydd Carlin	TKO	4 (4)	11 October 2003	Mountbatten Centre, Portsmouth, England	
5	Win	5–0	Andrei Mircea	TKO	3 (4)	15 November 2003	Oberfrankenhalle, Bayreuth, Germany	
6	Win	6–0	Jus Wallie	PTS	4	6 December 2003	Wales National Ice Rink, Cardiff, Wales	
7	Win	7–0	Karl Taylor	PTS	4	27 March 2004	Meadowbank Stadium, Edinburgh, Scotland	
8	Win	8–0	Frederic Bonifai	PTS	6	3 July 2004	Newport Centre, Newport, Wales	
9	Win	9–0	Buster Dennis	PTS	6	3 September 2004	Newport Centre, Newport, Wales	
10	Loss	9–1	Haider Ali	TKO	3 (6)	21 January 2005	Bridgend Leisure Centre, Bridgend, Wales	
11	Loss	9–2	Harry Ramogoadi	TKO	5 (6)	23 July 2005	Meadowbank Stadium, Edinburgh, Scotland	
12	Win	10–2	Mettle Ayitey	PTS	6	5 April 2008	Newport Centre, Newport, Wales	
13	Win	11–2	Dai Davies	TKO	2 (10)	12 July 2008	Newport Centre, Newport, Wales	Won Welsh Area super-featherweight title
14	Win	12–2	Steve Gethin	PTS	4	26 November 2008	Hotel Café Royal, London, England	
15	Win	13–2	Youssef al-Hamidi	PTS	6	21 February 2009	Rhydycar Leisure Centre, Merthyr Tydfil, Wales	
16	Win	14–2	Andrey Kostin	PTS	6	13 March 2009	Newport Centre, Newport, Wales	
17	Win	15–2	Akaash Bhatia	PTS	10	30 June 2009	York Hall, Bethnal Green, England	
18	Win	16–2	Mickey Coveney	PTS	6	11 December 2009	Newport Centre, Newport, Wales	
19	Loss	16–3	Martin Lindsay	UD	12	19 March 2010	Leigh Sports Village, Leigh, England	For the British super-featherweight title
20	Win	17–3	Robbie Turley	SD	3	29 May 2010	York Hall, Bethnal Green, England	Prizefighter quarter-final
21	Loss	17–4	Ricky Owen	UD	3	29 May 2010	York Hall, Bethnal Green, England	Prizefighter semi-final
22	Win	18–4	Kris Hughes	UD	12	16 October 2010	The Troxy, London, England	Won vacant Commonwealth super-bantamweight title
23	Loss	18–5	Jason Booth	SD	12	5 February 2011	Brentwood Centre, Brentwood, England	Lost Commonwealth super-bantamweight title; For British super-bantamweight title
24	Loss	18–6	Scott Quigg	TKO	8 (12)	4 February 2012	Dr Vere Whites Hotel, Bolton, England	For British super-bantamweight title
25	Win	19–6	Antonio Horvatic	PTS	6	30 October 2015	Newport Centre, Newport, Wales	
