= Fred Banks =

Fred Banks may refer to:

- Fred L. Banks Jr. (born 1942), justice of the Supreme Court of Mississippi
- Fred Banks (American football) (born 1962), American football wide receiver

== See also ==
- Freddie Banks (born 1965), American basketball player
- Freddie Banks (American football) (born 1988), American football coach
- Frederick Banks (1888–1957), English footballer
- Frederick Banks (priest) (fl. 1930s–1960s), Archdeacon of Trinidad
