= Kertson Manswell =

Trinidad and Tobago boxer

Personal information
- Nickname: The Pride of Tobago
- Nationality: Trinidad and Tobago
- Born: October 28, 1976 (age 49) Pembroke, Tobago
- Height: 6 ft 4 in (1.93 m)
- Weight: Heavyweight

Boxing career
- Stance: Orthodox

Boxing record
- Total fights: 37
- Wins: 25
- Win by KO: 18
- Losses: 12
Medal record
Commonwealth Games
Silver medal – second place	2002 Manchester	Heavyweight
Pan American Games
Silver medal – second place	2003 Santo Domingo	Heavyweight
Central American and Caribbean Games
Silver medal – second place	2002 San Salvador	Heavyweight

Kertson Manswell (born October 28, 1976) also known as The Pride of Tobago, is a heavyweight former professional boxer from Trinidad and Tobago.

== Amateur career ==
At the 2002 Commonwealth Games, Manswell won the silver medal, losing the gold to Canadian Jason Douglas. Manswell again won silver at the 2002 Central American and Caribbean Games, losing final to Victor Bisbal. At the 2003 Pan Am Games Manswell beat American Devin Vargas in the semifinals, but lost in the final to Cuban Odlanier Solis 3 to 15, giving him yet another silver medal. Manswell lost to Vargas in 2004 at the Olympic Qualifying Tournament and did not continue to the 2004 Summer Olympics.

== Professional career ==
Manswell turned pro in 2004 at age 27 and beat his first 20 opponents, including Louis Monaco.

Manswell signed with boxing promoter Don King.

In 2011 Manswell lost three fights in a row; first KO'd by Bermane Stiverne, then outpointed by undefeated Mike Perez and fringe contender Cedric Boswell.

In 2012 he was outpointed by former and future world champion Ruslan Chagaev.

== MMA ==
In 2018 Manswell at the age of 43 announced that he would begin training in Mixed Martial Arts (MMA) and would be featured in the main bout against MMA fighter and sambo champion Jeremy Rodulfo in the Ruff and Tuff MMA tournament in Couva. Rodulfo defeated Manswell by securing a submission via a rear naked choke hold.

== Professional boxing record ==
25 Wins (18 knockouts, 7 decisions), 12 Losses (7 knockout, 5 decisions)
Result	Record	Opponent	Type	Round	Date	Location	Notes
Win	2–2–1	(Trinidad and Tobago) Kenneth Bishop	UD	8	09/02/2019	Woodbook Youth Facility, Port of Spain, Trinidad and Tobago	
Loss	20–0–1	(Ukraine) Vyacheslav Glazkov	KO	4 (10), 1:33	15/08/2015	Basket Hall, Krasnodar, Russia	
Loss	8–4	(Trinidad and Tobago) Mitchell Rogers	UD	12	19/06/2015	San Fernando, Trinidad and Tobago	
Loss	10–0	(Romania) Bogdan Dinu	TKO	2 (8), 2:04	23/09/2014	Montreal Casino, Montreal, Canada	
Loss	17–0–1	(United States) Charles Martin	TKO	3 (10), 2:33	23/06/2014	(United States) BB King Blues Club & Grill, New York City, New York, U.S.	For WBO–NABO heavyweight title
Win	20–2	(Trinidad and Tobago) Wendell Jorkhu	KO	2	1/12/2013	Marabella, Trinidad and Tobago	
Win	20–2	(United States) Tor Hamer	TKO	1	14/08/2013	(United States) BB King Blues Club & Grill, New York City, New York, U.S.	
Loss	15–1	(United States) Skip Scott	UD	12	10/01/2013	(United States) Bayou Event Center, Houston, Texas, U.S.	for World Boxing Foundation Intercontinental Heavyweight Title
Loss	31–0	(United States) Deontay Wilder	TKO	1	04/08/2012	(United States) Mobile Civic Center–Expo Hall, Mobile, Alabama, U.S.	
Loss	25–0	(Russia) Alexander Ustinov	TKO	1	3 Mar 2012	ESPRIT arena, Düsseldorf, Germany	
Loss	27-2-1	(Uzbekistan) Ruslan Chagaev	UD	8	28/01/2012	Grand Elysée, Rotherbaum, Germany	
Win	6–3	(Trinidad and Tobago) Mitchell Rodgers	UD	12	30/12/2011	Woodbook Youth Centre, Port of Spain, Trinidad and Tobago	
Win	6–15–3	(Guyana) Leon Gilkes	KO	1	19/11/2011	Port of Spain, Trinidad and Tobago	
Win	6–8–1	(Barbados) Curtis Murray	KO	1	29/07/2011	Port of Spain, Trinidad and Tobago	
Loss	34–1	(United States) Cedric Boswell	UD	10	04/06/2011	(United States) Hollywood, Florida, U.S.	WBC Latino/NABA World Heavyweight Titles.
Loss	13–0	(Cuba) Mike Perez	UD	3	07/05/2011	(United Kingdom) Muswell Hill, London, England	Prizefighter Tournament International Heavyweight Quarter-Finals. Manswell was knocked down in the first round.
Loss	19–1–1	(Canada) Bermane Stiverne	TKO	2	29/01/2011	(United States) Pontiac, Michigan, U.S.	WBC International/WBC USNBC/WBA Fedelatin Heavyweight Titles. Referee stopped the bout at 1:52 of the second round.
Win	4–25–5	(Czech Republic) Tomas Mrazek	UD	8	19/03/2010	Merksem, Antwerp, Belgium	
Win	28–49–1	(United States) Dennis McKinney	UD	8	20/02/2010	Mérida, Mexico	
Win	16–3–1	(Trinidad and Tobago) Jimmy Joseph	TKO	4	24/07/2009	Bacolet, Trinidad and Tobago	Trinidad and Tobago Heavyweight Title. Referee stopped the bout at 2:59 of the fourth round.
Win	9–24–2	(United States) Cullen Rogers	TKO	1	04/04/2009	Pleasantville, Trinidad and Tobago	Referee stopped the bout at 2:58 of the first round.
Win	14–18–1	(United States) Earl Ladson	SD	8	02/08/2008	Ponce, Puerto Rico, U.S.	
Win	8–7	(United States) Cerrone Fox	TKO	1	27/03/2008	(United States) St Louis, Missouri, U.S.	Referee stopped the bout at 1:53 of the first round.
Win	9–12	(United States) Willie Perryman	UD	8	30/11/2007	(United States) Tampa, Florida, U.S.	
Win	12–3–1	(Bolivia) Saul Farah	TKO	7	26/12/2006	Mucurapo, Trinidad and Tobago	
Win	23–10	(United States) Corey Sanders	UD	10	14/10/2006	Bacolet, Trinidad and Tobago	
Win	14–32–4	(United States) Louis Monaco	TKO	8	15/06/2006	Fyzabad, Trinidad and Tobago	Referee stopped the bout at 2:36 of the eighth round.
Win	2–2–1	(United States) Glen Williams	TKO	3	31/03/2006	Pointe-a-Pierre, Trinidad and Tobago	Referee stopped the bout at 2:42 of the third round.
Win	5–0–1	(Barbados) Curtis Murray	KO	3	27/01/2006	Princes Town, Trinidad and Tobago	Murray knocked out at 1:19 of the third round.
Win	--	(Aruba) Salim Zinnerman	TKO	1	12/01/2006	Marabella, Trinidad and Tobago	Referee stopped the bout at 1:01 of the first round.
Win	3–2	(Jamaica) Kerron Speid	KO	3	28/10/2005	Saint James, Trinidad and Tobago	Speid knocked out at 2:39 of the third round.
Win	--	(Guyana) Mitchell Rogers	KO	1	13/08/2005	Saint James, Trinidad and Tobago	Rogers knocked out at 1:28 of the first round.
Win	--	(Trinidad and Tobago) Mickey Richards	TKO	3	16/06/2005	Fyzabad, Trinidad and Tobago	Referee stopped the bout at the end of the third round.
Win	--	(Guyana) Clyde Williams	TKO	1	03/12/2004	Bacolet, Trinidad and Tobago	Referee stopped the bout at 2:42 of the first round.
Win	0–1	(Guyana) Kurt Bess	TKO	4	28/11/2004	Georgetown, Guyana	Referee stopped the bout at 1:20 of the fourth round.
Win	--	(Guyana) Kurt Bess	TKO	1	23/09/2004	Port of Spain, Trinidad and Tobago	Referee stopped the bout at 0:54 of the first round.
Win	2–10	(Trinidad and Tobago) David McMillan	KO	1	29/07/2004	Arima, Trinidad and Tobago	McMillan knocked out at 0:40 of the first round.
