= Athletics at the 2001 Summer Universiade – Men's 800 metres =

The men's 800 metres event at the 2001 Summer Universiade was held at the Workers Stadium in Beijing, China between 30 August and 1 September.

== Medalists ==
Gold	Silver	Bronze
Khalid Tighazouine; Morocco	Derrick Peterson; United States	Otukile Lekote; Botswana

== Results ==
=== Heats ===
Rank	Heat	Athlete	Nationality	Time	Notes
1	2	Khalid Tighazouine	Morocco	1:46.89	Q
2	2	Otukile Lekote	Botswana	1:47.11	Q
3	2	Arnoud Okken	Netherlands	1:47.16	q
4	1	Grzegorz Krzosek	Poland	1:48.28	Q
5	1	Mouhssin Chehibi	Morocco	1:48.90	Q
6	4	Mark Rodgers	New Zealand	1:49.09	Q
7	5	Kris McCarthy	Australia	1:49.29	Q
8	3	Stefan Beumer	Netherlands	1:49.30	Q
9	1	Jackson Kiprotich Langat	Kenya	1:49.33	q
10	5	Christian Neunhauserer	Italy	1:49.36	Q
11	3	Neil Speaight	Great Britain	1:49.43	Q
12	4	Derrick Peterson	United States	1:49.44	Q
13	3	Heleodoro Navarro	Mexico	1:49.54	q
14	5	Li Guangming	China	1:49.59	q
15	5	Urmet Uusorg	Estonia	1:49.62	
16	5	Mao Tjiroze	Namibia	1:49.70	
17	4	Artyom Mastrov	Russia	1:49.71	
18	1	Kjetil Hodnekvam	Norway	1:49.76	
19	6	Jess Strutzel	United States	1:49.82	Q
20	6	Simon Lees	Great Britain	1:49.89	Q
21	6	Conor Sweeney	Ireland	1:50.08	
22	2	Frazer Dowling	Australia	1:50.81	
23	4	Stelian Tufaru	Romania	1:51.10	
24	2	Nick Willis	New Zealand	1:51.11	
25	5	Vajira Kularatne	Sri Lanka	1:54.57	
26	5	Abraham Khumalo	Swaziland	1:55.56	
27	5	Kabemba Mwape	Zambia	1:55.61	
28	3	Johnson Rukundo	Rwanda	1:57.15	
29	3	Anirut Saisut	Thailand	1:58.14	
30	6	Majed Al-Bousafi	Oman	1:58.51	
31	2	Gerald Grech	Malta	1:58.94	
32	3	So Hoi Nam	Hong Kong	1:59.40	
33	4	Mohamed Ashadur Rahman	Bangladesh	2:01.31	
34	4	Mohamed Al-Azri	Oman	2:01.61	
35	1	Telguy Djibeng	Chad	2:01.76	
36	6	Ng Kian Kok	Singapore	2:01.94	
37	4	Hei Chio Song	Macau	2:04.41	
38	3	Mohamed El-Douma	Sudan	2:15.91	
39	6	Ng Siu Hang	Macau	2:19.47	
	1	Sium Gebreamlak	Eritrea	DNF	

=== Semifinals ===
Rank	Heat	Athlete	Nationality	Time	Notes
1	1	Khalid Tighazouine	Morocco	1:46.37	Q
2	1	Arnoud Okken	Netherlands	1:46.40	Q
3	1	Otukile Lekote	Botswana	1:46.46	Q
4	1	Jess Strutzel	United States	1:46.70	q
5	1	Kris McCarthy	Australia	1:46.77	q
6	2	Derrick Peterson	United States	1:46.91	Q
7	2	Stefan Beumer	Netherlands	1:47.00	Q
8	2	Mouhssin Chehibi	Morocco	1:47.02	Q
9	2	Mark Rodgers	New Zealand	1:47.04	
10	2	Grzegorz Krzosek	Poland	1:47.26	
11	1	Christian Neunhauserer	Italy	1:48.08	
12	2	Jackson Kiprotich Langat	Kenya	1:48.58	
13	2	Neil Speaight	Great Britain	1:48.87	
14	1	Li Guangming	China	1:48.88	
15	2	Heleodoro Navarro	Mexico	1:49.97	
	1	Simon Lees	Great Britain	DNF	

=== Final ===
Rank	Athlete	Nationality	Time	Notes
1st place, gold medalist(s)	Khalid Tighazouine	Morocco	1:45.27	
2nd place, silver medalist(s)	Derrick Peterson	United States	1:45.49	
3rd place, bronze medalist(s)	Otukile Lekote	Botswana	1:45.63	
4	Arnoud Okken	Netherlands	1:45.64	NJR
5	Kris McCarthy	Australia	1:46.15	
6	Mouhssin Chehibi	Morocco	1:46.87	
7	Jess Strutzel	United States	1:47.60	
8	Stefan Beumer	Netherlands	1:56.26	
