= Daniel Geale =

Australian boxer (born 1981)

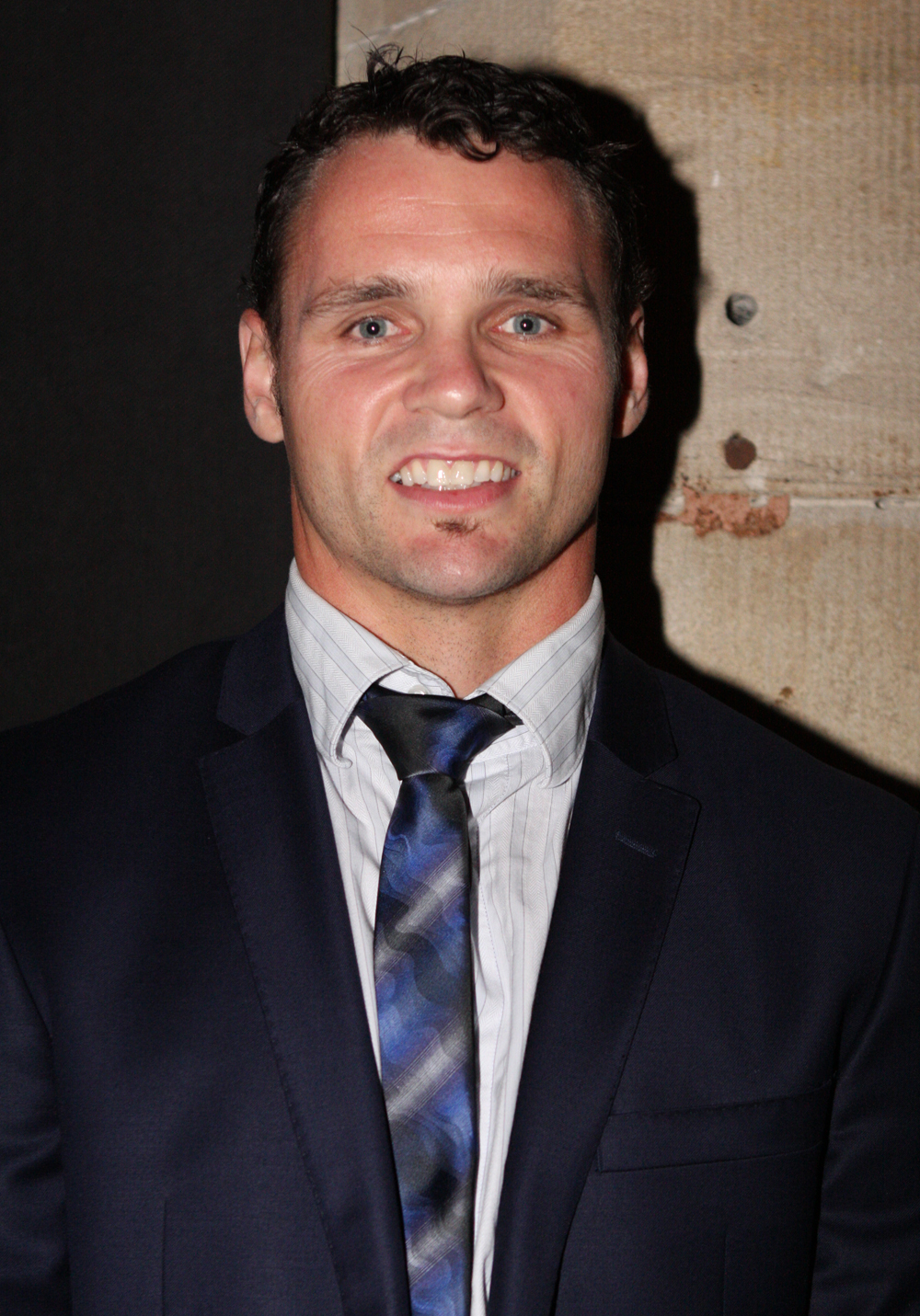
- Geale in 2013

Personal information
- Nickname: Real Deal
- Nationality: Australian
- Born: 26 February 1981 (age 45) Launceston, Tasmania, Australia
- Height: 1.78 m (5 ft 10 in)
- Weight: Light-middleweight; Middleweight; Super-middleweight

Boxing career
- Reach: 180 cm (71 in)
- Stance: Orthodox

Boxing record
- Total fights: 36
- Wins: 31
- Win by KO: 16
- Losses: 5
Medal record
Men's amateur boxing
Representing Australia
Commonwealth Games
Gold medal – first place	2002 Manchester	Welterweight
East Asian Games
Silver medal – second place	2001 Osaka	Welterweight

Daniel Geale (born 26 February 1981) is an Australian former professional boxer who competed from 2004 to 2016. He held the unified WBA (Super) and IBF middleweight titles between 2011 and 2013, and the IBO middleweight title from 2007 to 2009. As an amateur boxer, Geale won a welterweight gold medal at the 2002 Commonwealth Games.

== Early life ==
Born in Launceston, Tasmania, Geale is of mixed British and Aboriginal ancestry.

== Amateur career ==
Other than winning the 2002 Commonwealth Games at welterweight, Geale also represented his native country at the 2000 Summer Olympics. He lost in the first round to Italy's Leonard Bundu. He was an Australian Institute of Sport scholarship holder.

=== Amateur highlights ===
- 2000 Olympic Games in Sydney, Australia as a welterweight:
  - Lost to Leonard Bundu (Italy) 2:4
- 2001 East Asian Games in Osaka, Japan:
  - Defeated Naoki Hirata (Japan) +12-12
  - Lost to Gennady Golovkin (Kazakhstan) 3-15
- 2002 Commonwealth Games in Manchester, won Gold Medal:
  - Defeated Tsetsi Davis (Jamaica) rsf
  - Defeated Tony Cesay (Sle) 25-13
  - Defeated Daniel Codling (New Zealand) 27-13
  - Defeated Kwanele Zulu (South Africa)
- 2002 Boxing World Cup in Astana, Kazakhstan:
  - Lost to Mustafa Karagollu (Turkey)
  - Lost to Yudel Jhonson (Cuba) RSC 2
- 2003 World Championships in Bangkok, Thailand
  - Lost to Bakhtiyar Artayev (Kazakhstan) 8-30

== Professional career ==
=== Early stages ===
Geale turned pro in 2004, knocking out Danny Bellert in the third round. He then went on to build a record of 17 bouts for 17 wins with 12 KO's. On 14 December 2007, Geale fought for the IBO Middleweight Championship of the world against another undefeated Australian, Daniel Dawson, who was 29-0-0 with 20 KO's coming into the fight. Geale outclassed Dawson over 12 rounds to win the IBO Middleweight title with the judges scoring the bout 120-110, 120-110 and 119-109.

In June 2008, Geale defended his IBO Middleweight Championship with another 12 round unanimous decision over Geard Ajetovic. In December 2008, Geale faced Daniel MacKinnon in a non-title bout. Geale was down in the 8th, McKinnon was down in the 4th, 6th & twice in the 8th, Geale won a unanimous decision with judges scoring the bout 100-87, 100-87, 100-88. In March 2009 Geale defeated Ian MacKillop with a first-round knockout but in May of that year he lost his next fight in a controversial split decision to former WBA super middleweight champion Anthony Mundine to lose his IBO middleweight title. Mundine later stated that he hardly studied Geale during his training camp for the fight. Geale however, would rebound from the controversial defeat with three wins including an IBF Eliminator setting himself up for a world title shot.

=== IBF middleweight champion ===
In May 2011, Geale defeated Sebastian Sylvester in Germany by split decision (scores of 118-110, 118-112, 110-118) to become the new IBF middleweight world champion. In August 2011, he made his first successful title defense against contender Eromosele Albert, winning by unanimous decision. Geale made his second successful IBF title defense by defeating Ghana's Osumanu Adama via unanimous decision (scores of 118-110, 117-111, 115-113) on 7 March 2012.

=== Unified middleweight champion ===
On 1 September 2012, Geale defeated long time WBA champion Felix Sturm in Oberhausen, Germany via split decision (scores of 116-112, 116-112, 112-116), thus unifying the WBA title with his already held IBF title.

Geale's reign as unified champion was short-lived, as two months after winning the WBA title, he was stripped of it for choosing to fight Anthony Mundine in a rematch over mandatory challenger Gennady Golovkin. Geale was punished for Sturm's refusal to fight mandatory challengers when he was champion. When Geale won the title, the WBA gave him four-and-a-half months instead of the regular nine to defend against the mandatory - in this case Golovkin. Their reasoning was that their mandatory challengers had been ignored for too long.

=== Geale vs. Mundine II ===
On 30 January 2013, Geale beat Anthony Mundine in a unanimous points decision (scores of 116-112, 117-111, 117-111) at the Sydney Entertainment Centre to retain his IBF middleweight world title. Immediately after ring announcer Jimmy Lennon Jr. read out the result, Mundine and his entourage stormed out of the ring and left the arena.

=== Geale vs. Barker ===
On 17 August 2013, Geale fought British fighter Darren Barker for Geale's IBF Middleweight world title in Atlantic City. Despite knocking down Barker in the sixth round, Geale lost in a split-decision.

=== Geale vs. Golovkin ===
In what was billed as the biggest night of his career and taking place in the legendary Madison Square Garden, Geale lost by TKO in the third round to the Kazakh Gennady Golovkin. Entering the fight as the clear underdog with Golovkin listed by most bookmakers as the 14 to 1 favourite and despite having fought, according to Golovkin "like a champion", Geale was clearly outclassed by Golovkin when during the final exchange Golovkin counterpunched Geale after Geale had connected with a right to the Kazakh's head.

=== Geale vs. Fletcher ===
Geale defeated Jarrod Fletcher by unanimous decision to win the vacant WBO Asia Pacific interim and PABA middleweight titles at the Hordern Pavilion in Sydney, Australia, on 3 December 2014.

=== Geale vs. Cotto ===
On 6 June 2015, Geale challenged WBC middleweight champion Miguel Cotto at the Barclays Center in New York City, USA. He lost by technical knockout in the fourth round.

=== Geale vs. Quinlan ===
Moving up in weight divisions, Geale fought Renold Quinlan for the vacant IBO super-middleweight title at the Silverdome in Launceston, Australia, on 14 October 2016. He lost by knockout in the second round.

== Professional boxing record ==
36 fights	31 wins	5 losses
By knockout	16	3
By decision	15	2

No.	Result	Record	Opponent	Type	Round, time	Date	Location	Notes
36	Loss	31–5	Renold Quinlan	KO	2 (12), 1:14	14 Oct 2016	Silverdome, Launceston, Australia	For vacant IBO super-middleweight title
35	Loss	31–4	Miguel Cotto	TKO	4 (12), 1:28	6 Jun 2015	Barclays Center, New York City, New York, US	For WBC and The Ring middleweight titles
34	Win	31–3	Jarrod Fletcher	UD	12	3 Dec 2014	Hordern Pavilion, Sydney, Australia	Won vacant WBO Asia Pacific interim and PABA middleweight titles
33	Loss	30–3	Gennady Golovkin	TKO	3 (12), 2:47	26 Jul 2014	Madison Square Garden, New York City, New York, US	For WBA (Super) and IBO middleweight titles
32	Win	30–2	Garth Wood	RTD	6 (12), 3:00	19 Feb 2014	Hordern Pavilion, Sydney, Australia	Won WBA Pan African and vacant IBF Pan Pacific middleweight titles
31	Loss	29–2	Darren Barker	SD	12	17 Aug 2013	Revel Casino Hotel, Atlantic City, New Jersey, US	Lost IBF middleweight title
30	Win	29–1	Anthony Mundine	UD	12	30 Jan 2013	Entertainment Centre, Sydney, Australia	Retained IBF middleweight title
29	Win	28–1	Felix Sturm	SD	12	1 Sep 2012	König Pilsener Arena, Oberhausen, Germany	Retained IBF middleweight title; Won WBA (Super) middleweight title
28	Win	27–1	Osumanu Adama	UD	12	7 Mar 2012	Derwent Entertainment Centre, Hobart, Australia	Retained IBF middleweight title
27	Win	26–1	Eromosele Albert	UD	12	31 Aug 2011	Derwent Entertainment Centre, Hobart, Australia	Retained IBF middleweight title
26	Win	25–1	Sebastian Sylvester	SD	12	7 May 2011	Jahnsportforum, Neubrandenburg, Germany	Won IBF middleweight title
25	Win	24–1	Roman Karmazin	TKO	12 (12), 2:30	31 Oct 2010	State Sports Centre, Sydney, Australia	
24	Win	23–1	Kariz Kariuki	TKO	11 (12), 2:49	2 Jun 2010	Entertainment Centre, Wollongong, Australia	Won vacant IBF Pan Pacific super-middleweight title
23	Win	22–1	Samir Santos Barbosa	UD	12	21 Oct 2009	Silverdome, Launceston, Australia	Won vacant IBF Pan Pacific middleweight title
22	Loss	21–1	Anthony Mundine	SD	12	27 May 2009	Entertainment Centre, Brisbane, Australia	Lost IBO middleweight title
21	Win	21–0	Ian MacKillop	KO	1 (10), 1:58	11 Mar 2009	The Cube, Sydney, Australia	
20	Win	20–0	Daniel McKinnon	UD	10	5 Dec 2008	The Cube, Sydney, Australia	
19	Win	19–0	Geard Ajetović	UD	12	27 Jun 2008	Campbelltown Catholic Club, Sydney, Australia	Retained IBO middleweight title
18	Win	18–0	Daniel Dawson	UD	12	14 Dec 2007	Campbelltown Stadium, Sydney, Australia	Won vacant IBO middleweight title
17	Win	17–0	Lee Oti	KO	2 (8), 2:06	12 Oct 2007	Penrith Stadium, Sydney, Australia	
16	Win	16–0	Parkpoom Jangphonak	UD	12	4 May 2007	Endeavour Field, Sydney, Australia	Won vacant IBF Pan Pacific and IBO Inter-Continental middleweight titles
15	Win	15–0	Lee Oti	UD	12	4 Feb 2007	State Sports Centre, Sydney, Australia	Retained IBF Pan Pacific and OPBF interim light-middleweight titles
14	Win	14–0	Somchai Chimlum	UD	6	15 Dec 2006	Fairy Meadow Fraternity Bowling Club, Wollongong, Australia	
13	Win	13–0	Sonni Michael Angelo	TKO	4 (10), 2:55	4 Aug 2006	Campbelltown Catholic Club, Sydney, Australia	
12	Win	12–0	Nonoy Gonzales	UD	8	7 Jul 2006	Campbelltown Catholic Club, Sydney, Australia	
11	Win	11–0	Timo Masua	KO	4 (8), 0:24	4 Mar 2006	City Hall, Hobart, Australia	
10	Win	10–0	Garry Comer	TKO	2 (10), 1:40	27 Nov 2005	Vodafone Arena, Melbourne, Australia	
9	Win	9–0	Garry Comer	KO	8 (12), 1:48	22 Oct 2005	Convention and Exhibition Centre, Sydney, Australia	Won vacant OPBF interim light-middleweight title
8	Win	8–0	Steve Douet	TKO	2 (12), 1:01	16 Sep 2005	Blacktown RSL Club, Sydney, Australia	Won vacant IBF Pan Pacific light-middleweight title
7	Win	7–0	Steve Douet	UD	6	1 Jul 2005	Panthers World of Entertainment, Sydney, Australia	
6	Win	6–0	Domenic DeVanna	TKO	1 (8), 2:08	1 Apr 2005	Panthers World of Entertainment, Sydney, Australia	
5	Win	5–0	Peter Rolph	KO	1 (8), 1:37	18 Mar 2005	Mansfield Tavern, Brisbane, Australia	
4	Win	4–0	Sean Connell	TKO	3 (6), 1:05	6 Feb 2005	Panthers World of Entertainment, Sydney, Australia	
3	Win	3–0	Bruce Glozier	KO	1 (6), 1:12	10 Dec 2004	Fankhauser Reserve, Gold Coast, Australia	
2	Win	2–0	Domenic DeVanna	TKO	2 (6), 2:22	19 Nov 2004	Blacktown RSL Club, Sydney, Australia	
1	Win	1–0	Danny Bellert	KO	3 (6), 1:27	1 Oct 2004	Fankhauser Reserve, Gold Coast, Australia	

Sporting positions
Regional boxing titles
Vacant Title last held by Shannan Taylor	IBF Pan Pacific light-middleweight champion 16 September 2005 – May 2007; Vacated	Vacant Title next held by Ryan Waters
Vacant Title last held by Seiji Takechi	OPBF light-middleweight champion Interim title 22 October 2005 – May 2007; Vacated	Vacant
Vacant Title last held by Peter Mitrevski Jr.	IBF Pan Pacific middleweight champion 4 May 2007 – December 2007; Vacated	Vacant Title next held by Himself
Vacant Title last held by Aaron Mitchell	IBO Inter-Continental middleweight champion 4 May 2007 – 14 December 2007; Won world title	Vacant Title next held by Osumanu Adama
Vacant Title last held by Himself	IBF Pan Pacific middleweight champion 21 October 2009 – June 2010; Vacated	Vacant Title next held by Sam Soliman
Vacant Title last held by Peter Mitrevski Jr.	IBF Pan Pacific super-middleweight champion 2 June 2010 – October 2010; Vacated	Vacant Title next held by Shannan Taylor
Preceded by Garth Wood	WBA Pan African middleweight champion 19 February 2014 – 26 July 2014; Lost bid for world title	Vacant Title next held by Dowayne Combrink
Vacant Title last held by Les Sherrington	IBF Pan Pacific middleweight champion 19 February 2014 – July 2014; Vacated	Vacant Title next held by Michael Zerafa
New title	WBO Asia Pacific middleweight champion Interim title 3 December 2014 – June 2015; Vacated	Vacant
Vacant Title last held by Jarrod Fletcher	PABA middleweight champion 3 December 2014 – June 2015; Vacated	Vacant
Minor world boxing titles
Vacant Title last held by Raymond Joval	IBO middleweight champion 14 December 2007 – 27 May 2009	Succeeded by Anthony Mundine
Major world boxing titles
Preceded by Sebastian Sylvester	IBF middleweight champion 7 May 2011 – 17 August 2013	Succeeded by Darren Barker
Preceded by Felix Sturm	WBA middleweight champion Super title 1 September 2012 – 2 November 2012; Stripped	Succeeded by Gennady Golovkin
