= Justin Kane =

Australian boxer

Personal information
- Full name: Justin Stewart Kane
- Nationality: Australia
- Born: 21 December 1981 (age 44) Ferntree Gully, Victoria
- Height: 1.65 m (5 ft 5 in)
- Weight: 54 kg (119 lb)

Sport
- Sport: Boxing
- Weight class: Bantamweight
- Club: Shamrock Boxing Club
Medal record
Commonwealth Games
Gold medal – first place	2002 Manchester	Bantamweight

Justin Stewart Kane (born 21 December 1981 in Ferntree Gully, Victoria) is an Australian bantamweight boxer. He won the gold medal in the men's bantamweight division at the 2002 Commonwealth Games in Manchester, United Kingdom. He represented his native country at the 2000 Summer Olympics, losing in the quarterfinals to Sergey Danilchenko from Ukraine.

He was an Australian Institute of Sport scholarship holder.

== Olympic results ==
- 1st round bye
- Defeated Sontaya Wongprates (Thailand) 15–13
- Lost to Sergey Danilchenko (Ukraine) RSC 4
