= Andy Morris (boxer) =

British boxer

Personal information
- Nickname: Wythenshaw Warrior
- Nationality: British
- Born: Andy Morris Jnr; 10 March 1983 (age 43) Wythenshawe, England
- Height: 5 ft 6 1/2 in (169 cm)
- Weight: Featherweight; Super featherweight

Boxing career
- Stance: Orthodox

Boxing record
- Total fights: 23
- Wins: 19
- Win by KO: 7
- Losses: 4
Medal record
Men's amateur boxing
Representing England
Commonwealth Games
Bronze medal – third place	2002 Manchester	Lightweight

Andy Morris (born 10 March 1983) is a British former boxer who competed professionally from 2003 to 2010. He held the British featherweight title from 2005 to 2006 and challenged twice for the vacant Commonwealth super featherweight title in 2010. As an amateur, he won a bronze medal in the lightweight division at the 2002 Commonwealth Games in Manchester, England.

== Boxing career ==
=== Amateur career ===
Morris won the 2002 Amateur Boxing Association British lightweight title, when boxing out of the West Wythenshawe ABC.

He represented the 2002 English team at the 2002 Commonwealth Games in Manchester, England, where he competed in the lightweight division. He won the bronze medal after beating Courtney Harvey of Jamaica and Reji Ramanand of India and Saheed Adigun Salawu of Nigeria before losing to Denis Zimba of Zambia in the semi-final bout.

=== Professional career ===
Morris had his first professional contest in January 2003 when he scored a points win over Jason Nesbitt at the Guild Hall in Preston. Four more fights that year resulted in four more victories giving Morris an unbeaten record of 5-0 at the end of his debut year. The following year saw another four wins for the Manchester boxer ensuring a record of 9-0 at the end of 2004. On 20 May 2005 Morris won the English title with a victory over Rocky Dean at the Elephant and Castle in Southwark.

==== British Featherweight champion ====
On 5 November 2005 Morris challenged Scotland's John Simpson for the vacant British title at the Braehead Arena in Glasgow winning via unanimous decision over 12 rounds. He made a successful first defence of the title defeating the then undefeated Rendall Munroe again in Scotland with the location this time being in Edinburgh. On 9 December 2006 Morris made a second defence against previous victim Simpson and suffered his first defeat when a bad cut forced the fight to be called off handing victory to Simpson. On 7 September 2007 Morris got a chance to regain his title at the Grosvenor House in Mayfair and lost for the second time to Simpson with the fight this time being called off in the 7th round.

==== Comeback and Super Featherweight challenge ====
Following the second defeat to Simpson, Morris took some time off from the ring saying that he needed time to analyze the defeat and what he could do to change things. He eventually returned with a victory over Youssef Al Hamidi on 27 March 2009. Two more wins followed in 2009 against Jesus Garcia Simon and Pierre Francois Bonicel before being given the opportunity in 2010 to fight once more for the British title although this time up at super featherweight. His opponent for the championship bout on 5 March 2010 was Dewsbury's Gary Sykes who had earned the shot following an eliminator win against Manchester's Anthony Crolla. The fight, in Huddersfield, ended in a unanimous but very close points victory for the undefeated Sykes and a third career defeat for Morris. Reflecting on the tight nature of the contest Sykes said after the fight "It was a real close decision and a tough fight for me".Andy split from long time trainer Bob Shannon citing 'needing a fresh start'. Signing with Hatton Promotions having left Frank Warren, Morris rebounded from the defeat with a win over Georgian boxer Nugzar Margvelashvili on 24 May 2010, making light work of his opponent and saying that he was "hungry for another shot" at the British title. Morris' last contest was for the English Super Featherweight Title at Bolton Arena v Anthony Crolla. Although clearly winning every round at distance and utilising his greatest weapon of body shots Morris' tired in the second half of the fight and was eventually stopped in the 6th round. This signalled the end of what proved to be a relatively unfulfilled but successful career. Morris finished having won the English and British Featherweight Titles, an earlier Commonwealth bronze at lightweight after taking a string of Amateur honours. Morris returned to his Landscaping business and his expanding family.

Preceded by Nicky Cook	British Featherweight Champion; 6 November 2005 – 9 December 2006	Succeeded by John Simpson
