= Haider Ali (boxer) =

Pakistani boxer (born 1979)

Personal information
- Nickname: Hazara
- Nationality: Pakistani
- Born: 12 November 1979 (age 46) Quetta, Pakistan
- Height: 5 ft 8 1/2 in (174 cm)
- Weight: Super Featherweight

Boxing career
- Stance: Orthodox

Boxing record
- Total fights: 9
- Wins: 5
- Win by KO: 1
- Losses: 3
- Draws: 1
- No contests: 0
Medal record
Men's boxing
Representing Pakistan
Asian Games
Bronze medal – third place	1998 Bangkok	Featherweight
South Asian Games
Gold medal – first place	1999 Kathmandu	Featherweight
Asian Championships
Gold medal – first place	2002 Seremban	Featherweight
Commonwealth Games
Gold medal – first place	2002 Manchester	Featherweight

Haider Ali (born 12 November 1979) is a Pakistani retired professional boxer who fought in the featherweight division. He is a Commonwealth Games gold medalist and an Olympian.

== Early life and amateur career ==
Haider started boxing at an early age, having decided to become a boxer after watching fellow countryman Hussain Shah win a bronze medal at the 1988 Summer Olympics in Seoul.

Haider became the National Champion in 1998 whist winning gold medals in the Green Hill International Boxing Tournament held at Karachi in 1998 and the Imam Khomeini International Boxing Tournament held in Iran in 1999.

Additionally, Haider won a bronze medal in the 1998 Asian Games held in Bangkok, losing in the semi-finals to Indonesia's Hermensen Ballo.

Representing Pakistan, Haider won a gold medal in the featherweight division in 1999 South Asian Games.

Haider Ali qualified for the 2000 Summer Olympics in Sydney but was defeated 5-4 by 1992 Summer Olympics bronze-medallist Ramazan Palyani in the Round of 32.

Haider won a bronze medal at the 24th Kings Cup boxing tournament in Bangkok being defeated by Thailand's Suttisak Samaksaman 7-3 in the semi-finals.

In 2002, Haider Ali defeated Thailand's Suttisak Samaksaman in the finals to win the gold medal in the Asian Championships which were held in Malaysia. He received the award of 'The Best Boxer of the Tournament' for the Asian Championships.

Haider won Pakistan's first gold medal in the any Commonwealth Games by defeating India's Som Bahadur Pun by a margin of 28-10 in a four-round final in the featherweight division of 2002 Commonwealth Games which was held in Manchester.

Following his victory in the 2002 Commonwealth Games, Haider received the Order of Merit from the government of Pakistan along with gifts such as a Jeep, house as well as a golden Kalashnikov rifle.

== Pro career ==
In 2003, Haider moved to Leyton in East London and signed Frank Warren as his manager and embarked upon a professional boxing career.

During his medical, he was found to have two perforated eardrums. The fact that he was able to box at the level he had without it affecting his performance was notable.

After undergoing surgery, Haider made his professional debut defeating Buster Dennis via points at York Hall on the undercard of Merdud Takaloo's WBU light-middleweight title defence against Jose Rosa Gomez.

Haider went on to beat both Jason Nesbitt and Jus Wallie via points in his debut year as a professional boxer.

However, he was not able to keep his early success going and lost his fourth fight against Stevie Bell via points.

In 2005, Haider knocked undefeated prospect and 2002 Commonweight Games lightweight gold medallist Jamie Arthur out via a clash of heads.

== Post-fight career ==
Following his retirement, Haider coached boxing within the UK for over 10 years and is currently the boxing coach at Energie Fitness in Wembley, UK.

== boxing record ==
7 fights	6 wins	0 losses
By knockout	5	0
By decision	1	0
Draws	1	

No.	Result	Record	Opponent	Type	Round, time	Date	Location	Notes
9	Draw	5–3-1	(United Kingdom) Carl Allen	PTS	4	25 Mar 2006	(United Kingdom) Meadowside Leisure Centre, Burton-on-Trent, UK	
8	Win	5–3	(United Kingdom) Kristian Laight	PTS	4	16 Feb 2006	(United Kingdom) Town Hall, Dudley, UK	
7	Loss	4–3	(United Kingdom) Daniel Thorpe	RTD	4 (6), 3:00	25 Nov 2005	(United Kingdom) Town Hall, Walsall, UK	
6	Loss	4–2	(United Kingdom) Ricky Burns	PTS	8	17 Jun 2005	(United Kingdom) Kelvin Hall, Glasgow, UK	
5	Win	4–1	(United Kingdom) Jamie Arthur	TKO	3 (6), 2:25	21 Jan 2005	(United Kingdom) Bridgend Leisure Centre, Bridgend, UK	
4	Loss	3–1	(United Kingdom) Stevie Bell	PTS	6	22 May 2004	(United Kingdom) Kingsway Leisure Centre, Widnes, UK	
3	Win	3–0	(Sri Lanka) Jus Wallie	PTS	4	29 Nov 2003	(United Kingdom) Braehead Arena, Glasgow, UK	
2	Win	2–0	(United Kingdom) Jason Nesbitt	PTS	4	17 Jul 2003	(United Kingdom) Goresbrook Leisure Centre, Dagenham, UK	
1	Win	1–0	(Uganda) Buster Dennis	PTS	4	24 May 2003	(United Kingdom) York Hall, Bethnal Green, UK	Professional debut
