= Cycling at the 2002 Commonwealth Games – Men's road race =

Men's road race at the 2002 Commonwealth Games
- Venue: Rivington Park
- Dates: 3 August
- Competitors: 87 from 24 nations
- Winning time: 4:43:17

Medalists
| gold medal | Stuart O'Grady | Australia |
| silver medal | Cadel Evans | Australia |
| bronze medal | Baden Cooke | Australia |

The men's road race event at the 2002 Commonwealth Games took place on 3 August on a route through the Rivington Park. The race length was 187.2km.

== Results ==
Result
| Rank | # | Cyclist | Time | Diff. |
|---|---|---|---|---|
| 1st place, gold medalist(s) | 30 | Stuart O'Grady (AUS) | 4:43:17 | |
| 2nd place, silver medalist(s) | 17 | Cadel Evans (AUS) | 4:45:25 | + 2:08 |
| 3rd place, bronze medalist(s) | 12 | Baden Cooke (AUS) | 4:45:45 | + 2:28 |
| 4 | 158 | Glen Mitchell (NZL) | s.t. | |
| 5 | 77 | Eric Wohlberg (CAN) | 4:46:04 | + 2:47 |
| 6 | 166 | Hayden Roulston (NZL) | 4:46:09 | + 2:52 |
| 7 | 177 | Robbie Hunter (RSA) | 4:46:18 | + 3:01 |
| 8 | 87 | Roger Hammond (ENG) | 4:46:19 | + 3:02 |
| 9 | 59 | Michael Barry (CAN) | s.t. | |
| 10 | 176 | David George (RSA) | 4:46:31 | + 3:14 |
| 11 | 76 | Mark Walters (CAN) | 4:49:16 | + 5:59 |
| 12 | 142 | Tommy Evans (NIR) | 4:52:52 | + 9:35 |
| 13 | 211 | Yanto Barker (WAL) | 4:52:53 | + 9:36 |
| 14 | 167 | Ryan Russell (NZL) | 4:53:34 | + 10:17 |
| 15 | 220 | Anthony Malarczyk (WAL) | s.t. | |
| 16 | 201 | Duncan Urquhart (SCO) | 4:54:13 | + 10:56 |
| 17 | 159 | Karl Moore (NZL) | 4:54:44 | + 11:27 |
| 18 | 106 | John Tanner (ENG) | s.t. | |
| 19 | 141 | Denis Easton (NIR) | 4:55:10 | + 11:53 |
| 20 | 204 | Emile Abraham (TTO) | 4:55:12 | + 11:55 |
| 21 | 91 | Mark Lovatt (ENG) | 4:55:13 | + 11:56 |
| 22 | 224 | Julian Winn (WAL) | s.t. | |
| 23 | 143 | Stephen Gallagher (NIR) | s.t. | |
| 24 | 178 | Malcolm Lange (RSA) | 4:55:14 | + 11:57 |
| 25 | 156 | Kashi Leuchs (NZL) | 4:55:15 | + 11:58 |
| 26 | 180 | Daniel Spence (RSA) | 4:55:20 | + 12:03 |
| 27 | 182 | Nicholas White (RSA) | s.t. | |
| 28 | 108 | Charly Wegelius (ENG) | 4:55:46 | + 12:29 |
| 29 | 138 | Mannie Heymans (NAM) | 4:57:20 | + 14:03 |
| 30 | 144 | David Gardiner (NIR) | 4:58:04 | + 14:47 |
| 31 | 216 | James Griffiths (WAL) | s.t. | |
| 32 | 120 | Andrew Roche (IOM) | s.t. | |
| 33 | 157 | Gordon McCauley (NZL) | s.t. | |
| — | 1 | Charles Bryan (ANG) | DNF | |
| — | 2 | Ronnie Bryan (ANG) | DNF | |
| — | 3 | Kris Pradel (ANG) | DNF | |
| — | 4 | Rory Gonsalves (ANT) | DNF | |
| — | 5 | Ken Jackson (ANT) | DNF | |
| — | 7 | Randy Simon (ANT) | DNF | |
| — | 31 | Nathan O'Neill (AUS) | DNF | |
| — | 33 | Luke Roberts (AUS) | DNF | |
| — | 34 | Michael Rogers (AUS) | DNF | |
| — | 40 | Johnny Hoyte (BAH) | DNF | |
| — | 41 | Jonathan Massie (BAH) | DNF | |
| — | 42 | Barron Musgrove (BAH) | DNF | |
| — | 48 | Kris Hedges (BER) | DNF | |
| — | 49 | Geri Mewett (BER) | DNF | |
| — | 50 | Steve Millington (BER) | DNF | |
| — | 51 | Mateo Cruz (BIZ) | DNF | |
| — | 52 | Ernest Meighan (BIZ) | DNF | |
| — | 53 | Andrew Smiling (BIZ) | DNF | |
| — | 54 | Jeffery Zelaya (BIZ) | DNF | |
| — | 55 | Serge Pitouo (CMR) | DNF | |
| — | 57 | Francois Talla (CMR) | DNF | |
| — | 58 | Martinien Tega (CMR) | DNF | |
| — | 64 | Gordon Fraser (CAN) | DNF | |
| — | 84 | Stuart Dangerfield (ENG) | DNF | |
| — | 99 | Max Sciandri (ENG) | DNF | |
| — | 111 | Mamudou Bah (GAM) | DNF | |
| — | 112 | Eliman Jammeh (GAM) | DNF | |
| — | 115 | Elliot Baxter (IOM) | DNF | |
| — | 117 | Graeme Hatcher (IOM) | DNF | |
| — | 119 | Mark Kelly (IOM) | DNF | |
| — | 123 | Horace McFarlane (JAM) | DNF | |
| — | 124 | Cleveland Sharpe (JAM) | DNF | |
| — | 126 | Chris Spence (JER) | DNF | |
| — | 127 | Arthur Kungu (KEN) | DNF | |
| — | 128 | David Mwangi (KEN) | DNF | |
| — | 129 | David Njau (KEN) | DNF | |
| — | 130 | George Onaye (KEN) | DNF | |
| — | 131 | Sydney Charles (LCA) | DNF | |
| — | 132 | Sammy Joseph (LCA) | DNF | |
| — | 137 | Marc Bassingthwaighte (NAM) | DNF | |
| — | 139 | Erik Hoffmann (NAM) | DNF | |
| — | 140 | Brendan Doherty (NIR) | DNF | |
| — | 147 | David McCann (NIR) | DNF | |
| — | 174 | James Perry (RSA) | DNF | |
| — | 194 | Jason MacIntyre (SCO) | DNF | |
| — | 198 | Ross Muir (SCO) | DNF | |
| — | 202 | Hudson Mathieu (SEY) | DNF | |
| — | 203 | Andy Rose (NAM) | DNF | |
| — | 209 | Stephen Mangroo (TTO) | DNF | |
| — | 226 | Maimba Malako (ZAM) | DNF | |
| — | 227 | Bruce Nkhoma (ZAM) | DNF | |
| — | 56 | Herve Simo (CMR) | DNS | |
| — | 222 | Huw Pritchard (WAL) | DNS | |
| — | 223 | Paul Sheppard (WAL) | DNS | |
