= Boxing at the 1998 Asian Games – Men's 51 kg =

Boxing competitions

Men's 51 kg at the 1998 Asian Games
- Venue: Land Sports Complex
- Date: 7–18 December 1998
- Competitors: 17 from 17 nations

Medalists
gold medal	Pramuansak Phosuwan	Thailand
silver medal	Hermensen Ballo	Indonesia
bronze medal	Haider Ali	Pakistan
bronze medal	Choi Jin-woo	South Korea

The men's flyweight boxing competition at the 1998 Asian Games in Bangkok, Thailand was held from 7 to 18 December at the Land Sports Complex.

Like all Asian Games boxing events, the competition was a straight single-elimination tournament. This event consisted of 17 boxers. The competition began with a single bout in the round 32 on 7 December, where the number of competitors was reduced to 16, and concluded with the final on 18 December. As there were fewer than 32 boxers in the competition, a number of boxers received a bye through the preliminary round. Both semi-final losers were awarded bronze medals.

All bouts consisted of five three-minute rounds. The boxers receive points for every successful punch they land on their opponent's head or upper body. The boxer with the most points at the end of the bouts wins. If a boxer is knocked to the ground and cannot get up before the referee counts to 10 then the bout is over and the opponent wins.

== Schedule ==
All times are Indochina Time (UTC+07:00)

Date	Time	Event
Monday, 7 December 1998	14:00	Round of 32
Tuesday, 8 December 1998	14:00	Round of 16
Friday, 11 December 1998	14:00	Quarterfinals
Tuesday, 15 December 1998	14:00	Semifinals
Friday, 18 December 1998	14:00	Final

== Results ==
Legend

- RSCO — Won by referee stop contest outclassed

=== Final ===
Final
Hermensen Ballo (INA)	3
Pramuansak Phosuwan (THA)	11

=== Top half ===
Round of 32

Round of 16
Nhothin Holapatiphone (LAO)
Boldbatyn Batsükh (MGL)	RSCO
Hermensen Ballo (INA)	12
Cha Ho-chol (PRK)	4
Bulat Zhumadilov (KAZ)	20
Rakib Ahmad (MAS)	9
Haider Ali (PAK)	11
Arlan Lerio (PHI)	8

Quarterfinals
Boldbatyn Batsükh (MGL)	5
Hermensen Ballo (INA)	18
Bulat Zhumadilov (KAZ)	5
Haider Ali (PAK)	8

Semifinals
Hermensen Ballo (INA)	11
Haider Ali (PAK)	3

=== Bottom half ===
Round of 32
Choi Jin-woo (KOR)	22
Var Dararith (CAM)	7

Round of 16
Mai Kangde (CHN)	13
Indra Bahadur Magar (NEP)	4
Bipplobul Hoque (BAN)
Pramuansak Phosuwan (THA)	RSCO
Taalaibek Kadiraliev (KGZ)	12
Kenji Nakazono (JPN)	6
Leong Ka Seng (MAC)
Choi Jin-woo (KOR)	RSCO

Quarterfinals
Mai Kangde (CHN)	3
Pramuansak Phosuwan (THA)	21
Taalaibek Kadiraliev (KGZ)	7
Choi Jin-woo (KOR)	8

Semifinals
Pramuansak Phosuwan (THA)	15
Choi Jin-woo (KOR)	3
