= Derrick Peterson =

American middle-distance runner

Personal information
- Nationality: American
- Born: November 28, 1977 (age 48) Waycross, Georgia, U.S.
- Height: 5 ft 11 in (1.80 m)
- Weight: 160 lb (73 kg)

Sport
- Sport: Track and field
- Event: 800 metres
- College team: University of Missouri
- Club: adidas
Medal record
Representing United States
Summer Universiade
Gold medal – first place	1999 Palma de Mallorca	4x400 m relay
Silver medal – second place	2001 Beijing	800 m
Bronze medal – third place	1999 Palma de Mallorca	800 m

Derrick Peterson (born November 28, 1977) is an American retired middle-distance runner who specialized in the 800 meters. He represented the USA at the 2004 Summer Olympics in Athens, Greece, 2001 World Championships in Edmonton, Canada. Was 2002 Indoor USA Track and Field Champion. He won the silver medal in the 800m event at the 2001 Summer Universiade and the bronze (800m) and gold as a member of the 4x400 meter relay at the 1999 Summer Universiade.

As a Coach, he was the assistant coach of long sprints, hurdles and Middle Distance at his alma mater, the University of Missouri from 2006 to 2012., assisted in establishing the first full men's and women's track and field programs at Columbia College, former Associate Head Coach for men's and women's cross country/track and field coach at DePaul University, where he assisted with winning two Men's Big East track and field championships, a first for the university.

In high School at Lovejoy High School, Georgia, he won three AAAA state championships in track and field. 1995 (1600m) and in 1996 repeated as state champion at (1600m and 3200m). Not limited to the track the middle distance specialist was also very effective on the grass, he was 1995 AAAA runner-up in GHSA cross country championships, helping his team to a state runner-up finish.

As a collegiate athlete for Mizzou, he won nine Big 12 conference championships at 800 meters, the first conference athlete to ever be undefeated in a single event from freshman to senior year. in 1999 he won two NCAA National championship for the Tigers, indoors setting the then American Collegiate Record of 1:45.88. then in Boise, ID he claimed the outdoor championship title in a time of 1:46.97.

== Competition record ==
Year	Competition	Venue	Position	Event	Notes
Representing the United States
1999	Universiade	Palma de Mallorca, Spain	3rd	800 m	1:46.75
1999	Universiade	Palma de Mallorca, Spain	1st (h)	4 × 400 m relay	3:05.03
2001	World Championships	Edmonton, Canada	25th (h)	800 m	1:48.56
2001	Universiade	Beijing, China	2nd	800 m	1:45.49
2004	World Indoor Championships	Budapest, Hungary	20th (h)	800 m	1:50.05
2004	Olympic Games	Athens, Greece	42nd (h)	800 m	1:47.60

== Personal bests ==
Outdoor

- 800 meters – 1:45.08 (Sacramento 2004)
- 1000 meters – 2:18

Indoor

- 800 meters – 1:45.88 (Indianapolis 1999)
- 1000 meters – 2:19.82 (Boston 2002)

Cross Country

- 10,000 meters – 32.52.80 (NCAA Champs)
