= Steven Birch =

English boxer

Personal information
- Nationality: British (English)
- Born: 25 September 1981 Whiston, England

Sport
- Sport: Boxing
- Event: Middleweight
- Club: St Helens Town ABC
Medal record
Representing England
Commonwealth Games
Silver medal – second place	2002 Manchester	middleweight

Stephen Birch also spelt Steven Birch (born 25 September 1981) is a light heavyweight boxer from England, who won a silver medal at the 2002 Commonwealth Games in Manchester, England.

== Biography ==
Birch represented the 2002 English team at the 2002 Commonwealth Games in Manchester, England, where he competed in the bantamweight division. He won the silver medal after beating Conall Carmichael of Northern Ireland and Steven McGuire of Scotland and Jitender Kumar of India before losing to Paul Miller of Australia in the gold medal bout.

Birch turned professional in September 2005 and contested 2 bouts between 2005 and 2008 at super middleweight.

In 2006 he was jailed for two years after admitting assault. He returned to the ring in 2008.
