= Kris McCarthy =

Australian middle-distance runner

Personal information
- Nationality: Australian
- Born: 15 October 1979 (age 47) Mildura, Victoria
- Height: 1.89 m (6 ft 2 in)
- Weight: 80 kg (180 lb)

Sport
- Sport: Athletics
- Event: 800 metres
- Club: Glenhuntly Athletics Club
Medal record
Representing Australia
Commonwealth Games
Bronze medal – third place	2002 Manchester	800m

Kristopher James "Kris" McCarthy (born 15 October 1979) is a retired Australian middle-distance runner who specialised in the 800 metres. He represented his country at the 2000 Summer Olympics without reaching the semifinals. He won the bronze medal in the event at the 2002 Commonwealth Games.

He has personal bests of 1:45.57 minutes in the 800 metres (Melbourne 2000) and 3:47.7 minutes in the 1500 metres (Melbourne 2003).

In 2017 he decided to play AFL Masters and won the Carrum Cowboys Masters Best & Fairest Award in his maiden year beating the unlucky Reynolds brothers, who finished 2nd and 3rd (respectively). He also has 3 kids.

== Competition record ==
Year	Competition	Venue	Position	Event	Notes
Representing Australia
2000	Olympic Games	Sydney, Australia	46th (h)	800 m	1:48.92
2001	Universiade	Beijing, China	5th	800 m	1:46.15
2001	Universiade	Beijing, China	7th (h)	4 × 400 m relay	3:08.19
2002	Commonwealth Games	Manchester, United Kingdom	3rd	800 m	1:46.79
2002	Commonwealth Games	Manchester, United Kingdom	4th (h)	4 × 400 m relay	3:04.39
2003	World Championships	Paris, France	20th (sf)	800 m	1:47.64
