= Renold Quinlan =

Australian boxer (born 1989)

Personal information
- Nickname: Dunghutti Destroyer
- Born: Renold Vatubua Quinlan; 7 July 1989 (age 37) Sydney, Australia
- Weight: Super-middleweight

Boxing career
- Stance: Orthodox

Boxing record
- Total fights: 32
- Wins: 17
- Win by KO: 12
- Losses: 15

Renold Vatubua Quinlan (born 7 July 1989) is an Australian boxer of Indigenous and Fijian descent. Best known for knocking out former world champion Daniel Geale, Quinlan held the IBO super-middleweight title from 2016 to 2017.

== Background ==
Quinlan, who grew up in Minto and Rosemeadow and attended Sarah Redfern High School. His amateur career stands at 12–3. His maternal grandfather, Sailosi Vatubua, represented Fiji in amateur boxing and won the gold medal at the 1966 South Pacific Games in Nouméa.

== Career ==
=== Quinlan vs. Geale ===
On 14 October 2016, Quinlan fought Daniel Geale for the vacant IBO super-middleweight title at the Silverdome in Launceston, Australia, on 14 October 2016. He won with a second round knockout.

=== Quinlan vs. Eubank Jr ===
On 4 February 2017 at Olympia in London, England, Quinlan was stopped in the 10th round by Chris Eubank Jr. via technical knockout, losing his IBO super-middleweight title in the process.

=== Quinlan vs. Hooper ===
On 7 April 2018 at the Convention & Exhibition Centre in Brisbane, Australia, Quinlan stepped up to a weight division for a bout with long-time rival Damien Hooper for the WBO International light-heavyweight title. He lost by technical knockout in the ninth round.

=== Quinlan vs. Buatsi ===
In his next fight, Quinlan fought undefeated WBA International light-heavyweight champion Joshua Buatsi at The O2 Arena, London, England, on 22 December 2018. He lost by first round technical knockout.

== Professional boxing record ==
16 fights	12 wins	4 losses
By knockout	8	3
By decision	4	1

No.	Result	Record	Opponent	Type	Round, time	Date	Location	Notes
16	Loss	12–4	Joshua Buatsi	TKO	1 (10), 1:50	22 Dec 2018	The O2 Arena, London, England	For WBA International light heavyweight title
15	Loss	12–3	Damien Hooper	TKO	9 (10) {{{1}}}	7 Apr 2018	Convention & Exhibition Centre, Brisbane	For the WBO International light heavyweight title
14	Win	12–2	Alexander Bajawa	KO	1 (10) {{{1}}}	20 Oct 2018	Suntec Int. Convention Centre, Singapore	
13	Loss	11–2	Chris Eubank Jr.	TKO	10 (12), 2:07	4 Feb 2017	Olympia, London, England	Lost IBO super-middleweight title
12	Win	11–1	Daniel Geale	KO	2 (12), 1:14	14 Oct 2016	Silverdome Basketball Stadium, Launceston, Australia	Won vacant IBO super-middleweight title
11	Win	10–1	Michael Van Nimwegen	KO	8 (10), 1:56	12 Dec 2015	Alexandria Basketball Stadium, Perry Park, Australia	Won PABA interim super-middleweight title
10	Win	9–1	Ricardo Ramallo	TKO	1 (10), 2:46	27 Jun 2015	Royal Exhibition Building, Carlton, Victoria, Australia	Won vacant IBO International super-middleweight title
9	Loss	8–1	Jake Carr	UD	10	3 Dec 2014	Hordern Pavilion, Moore Park, Australia	For Australian super-middleweight title
8	Win	8–0	Dechapon Suwunnalird	KO	4 (6), 1:46	9 Apr 2014	Entertainment Centre, Newcastle, Australia	
7	Win	7–0	Joel Casey	UD	8	29 Jan 2014	Brisbane Entertainment Centre, Boondall, Australia	
6	Win	6–0	Joseph Kwadjo	UD	8	27 Nov 2013	Allphones Arena, Sydney	
5	Win	5–0	Aswin Cabuy	TKO	1 (6), 1:18	27 Sep 2013	RSL Club, Dubbo, Australia	
4	Win	4–0	Tim Kanofski	MD	6	8 Aug 2013	Southport RSL Club, Southport, Australia	
3	Win	3–0	Marlon Toby	UD	4	4 Feb 2011	Croatian Club, Punchbowl, Australia	
2	Win	2–0	Mick Porter	TKO	2 (4), 1:49	11 Jan 2010	Entertainment Centre, Newcastle, Australia	
1	Win	1–0	Peme Lilomaiava	TKO	2 (4), 0:45	30 Jul 2008	Entertainment Centre, Newcastle, Australia	

Sporting positions
Regional boxing titles
Vacant Title last held by Piotr Wilczewski	IBO International super-middleweight champion 27 June 2015 – Oct 2015; Vacated	Vacant
Vacant Title last held by Zac Dunn	PABA super-middleweight champion Interim title 12 December 2015 – Mar 2016; Vacated	Vacant Title next held by Jayde Mitchell
Minor world boxing titles
Vacant Title last held by Zac Dunn	IBO super-middleweight champion 14 October 2016 – 4 February 2017	Succeeded by Chris Eubank Jr.
