= Marcelino Novaes =

Brazilian boxer (born 1967)

Personal information
- Born: July 9, 1967 (age 58) São Paulo, Brazil

Sport
- Sport: Boxing
Medal record
Men's Boxing
Representing Brazil
Pan American Games
Bronze medal – third place	1999 Winnipeg	Heavyweight

Marcelino Novaes Rodrigues Fil (born July 9, 1967) is a retired boxer from Brazil, who won the bronze medal in the heavyweight division at the 1999 Pan American Games, together with Jamaica's Kerron Speid. Nicknamed, Robocop, he made his professional debut in 2001.

Novaes relocated to Las Vegas. He soon met Max Wynn with whom he has worked several special security assignments and is now a full-time professional body guard in Las Vegas.
