= Frederick Banks (priest) =

Frederick Robert Banks, OBE was Archdeacon of Trinidad from 1947 until 1969, firstly in partnership with Charles Stokely Doorly until 1952 and then alone until his retirement.

After a curacy at Holy Trinity Cathedral, Port of Spain he was Vicar of Pembroke, Tobago from 1932 to 1934; Rector of Siparia from 1934 to 1939; and Vicar of La Brea from 1939 to 1952.
