= Otukile Lekote =

Motswana distance runner (born 1978)

Personal information
- Born: 19 October 1978 (age 48)

Sport
- Sport: Track and field
Medal record
Representing Botswana
African Championships
Silver medal – second place	2000 Algiers	4×400 m relay
Summer Universiade
Bronze medal – third place	2001 Beijing	800 m

Otukile Lekote (born 19 October 1978) is a middle distance runner from Botswana who specializes in the 800 metres.

Representing the South Carolina Gamecocks track and field team, Lekote won the 2001 and 2002 NCAA Division I Outdoor Track and Field Championships in the 800 m.

He won the bronze medal at the 2001 Summer Universiade and finished fourth at the 2002 Commonwealth Games. He also competed at the 2001 and 2003 World Championships without reaching the finals.

== Achievements ==
Year	Competition	Venue	Position	Event	Notes
Representing Botswana
2000	African Championships	Algiers, Algeria	2nd	4 × 400 m relay	3:06.07
2001	World Championships	Edmonton, Canada	28th (h)	800 m	1:49.40
2001	World Championships	Edmonton, Canada	15th (h)	4 × 400 m relay	3:03.32
2001	Universiade	Beijing, China	3rd	800 m	1:45.63
2002	Commonwealth Games	Manchester, United Kingdom	4th	800 m	1:47.04
2002	Commonwealth Games	Manchester, United Kingdom	10th (h)	4 × 400 m relay	3:09.04
2002	African Championships	Radès, Tunisia	4th (h)	800 m	1:48.16
2003	World Championships	Paris, France	36th (h)	800 m	1:48.33

== Personal bests ==
- 400 metres - 46.01 s (2001) - national record is 45.34 s.
- 800 metres - 1:44.47 min (2001)
