= Kennedy Kanyanta =

Zambian boxer (born 1979)

Personal information
- Born: April 10, 1979 (age 47) Mufulira, Zambia
Medal record
Men's Boxing
Representing Zambia
Commonwealth Games
Gold medal – first place	2002 Manchester	Flyweight
All-Africa Games
Bronze medal – third place	2007 Algiers	Flyweight

Kennedy Kanyanta (born April 10, 1979 in Mufulira, Copperbelt) is a Zambian boxer who won the 2002 Commonwealth Games in the men's flyweight division and bronze at the 2007 AllAfrica Games as an amateur.

== Amateur ==
At the Olympics 2000 he had a bye, and then lost his bout against Bulat Jumadilov 9:12. In Manchester at the Commonwealth Games 2002 he beat Lechedzani Luza in the final. (see Boxing at the 2002 Commonwealth Games)

Luza returned the favor at the 2006 Games.

At the AllAfricans 2007 he lost to Jackson Chauke.

== Pro ==
He turned pro in 2007 and won 2 bouts at bantamweight.He had 11 fights winning all of them and retired in 2011 as a champion with 3 belts, Africa Boxing Union belt, Global Boxing Union Intercontinental belt and International Boxing Organisation Inter continental belt.
