= Benoit Gaudet =

Canadian boxer (born 1979)

Personal information
- Nickname: Quebec Punch
- Born: Benoit Gaudet; December 18, 1979 (age 46) Drummondville, Quebec, Canada
- Height: 5 ft 10 in (1.78 m)
- Weight: Lightweight; Super Featherweight; Featherweight

Boxing career
- Reach: 71 in (182 cm)
- Stance: Orthodox

Boxing record
- Total fights: 25
- Wins: 23
- Win by KO: 10
- Losses: 2
- Draws: 0
- No contests: 0

Benoit Gaudet (born December 18, 1979, in Drummondville, Quebec, Canada) is a professional Canadian boxer in the Lightweight division. He's the former Canadian National Lightweight and North American Boxing Association Super Featherweight champion.

== Amateur career ==
Gaudet won a bronze medal in the bantamweight division at the 1999 World Amateur Boxing Championships in Houston, Texas. He also won a bronze medal in the featherweight category at the 2002 Commonwealth Games in Manchester, England. In the featherweight category at the 2004 Summer Olympics, he defeated Somluck Kamsing of Thailand before being eliminated by Jo Seok-hwan of South Korea.

== Pro career ==
In November 2007, Gaudet beat the veteran Alberto Garza to win the North American Boxing Association Super Featherweight championship.

=== WBC Super Featherweight Championship ===
On May 2, 2009, Gaudet was knocked out by WBC Super Featherweight champion Humberto Soto in the ninth rounds.
