= Danny Codling =

New Zealand boxer (born 1979)

Personal information
- Nationality: New Zealand
- Born: Daniel Emile Codling; 19 July 1979 (age 46) Auckland, New Zealand
- Weight: Light middleweight

Boxing career

Boxing record
- Total fights: 4
- Wins: 4
- Win by KO: 3
- Losses: 0
- Draws: 0
- No contests: 0
Medal record
Men's boxing
Representing New Zealand
Commonwealth Games
Bronze medal – third place	2002 Manchester	64-69kg (welterweight)

Daniel Emile Codling (born 19 July 1979 in Auckland, New Zealand) is a former boxer who won a bronze medal in the 64–69 kg (welterweight) division at the 2002 Commonwealth Games.
