= Gilbert Khunwane =

Botswana boxer (born 1977)

Personal information
- Nationality: Botswana
- Born: June 15, 1977 (age 49)
- Height: 1.74 m (5 ft 8 1/2 in)
- Weight: 60 kg (130 lb)

Sport
- Sport: Boxing
- Weight class: Lightweight
Medal record
Commonwealth Games
| Bronze medal – third place | 2002 Manchester | Lightweight |
All-Africa Games
| Bronze medal – third place | 1999 Johannesburg | Lightweight |

Gilbert "Ghisto" Khunwane (born 15 June 1977 in Mmankgodi) is a male retired boxer from Botswana, who competed at the 2000 Summer Olympics in Sydney, Australia. There he was eliminated in the first round of the men's lightweight (– 60 kg) division by Mexico's eventual bronze medalist Cristian Bejarano.

He won a bronze medal in lightweight at the 1999 All-Africa Games.

Khunwane won a bronze medal at the 2002 Commonwealth Games in Manchester. He carried the flag for his native country at the opening ceremony of the 2000 Summer Olympics in Sydney, Australia before retiring from the sport in 2005 to become a coach. He was Botswana national boxing team captain and assistant coach.

He was appointed Vice President of the Botswana Boxing Association in February 2019.

Olympic Games
| Preceded by Justice Dipeba | Flagbearer for Botswana; Sydney 2000 | Succeeded by Khumiso Ikgopoleng |
