= Jason Douglas (boxer) =

Canadian boxer

Personal information
- Born: August 17, 1978 (age 47)
Medal record
Men's Boxing
Representing Canada
Commonwealth Games
Gold medal – first place	2002 Manchester	Heavyweight
Pan American Games
Bronze medal – third place	2003 Santo Domingo	Heavyweight

Jason Douglas (born Aug 18, 1978) is a Canadian boxer who won gold at the 2002 Commonwealth Games in the heavyweight 91 kg/201 lbs limit division.

== Amateur ==
In Manchester 2002, he beat David Haye, Shane Cameron, and Kertson Manswell in the final 20-13 for the Commonwealth title.

He also earned a bronze medal at the PanAm Games 2003 in Santo Domingo after losing to world champion Odlanier Solis 2:16.

His amateur record was 88 bouts, with 76 wins (26 by TKO).

== Pro ==
Currently fighting in the light heavyweight division.
