= Star Tauasi =

New Zealand boxer

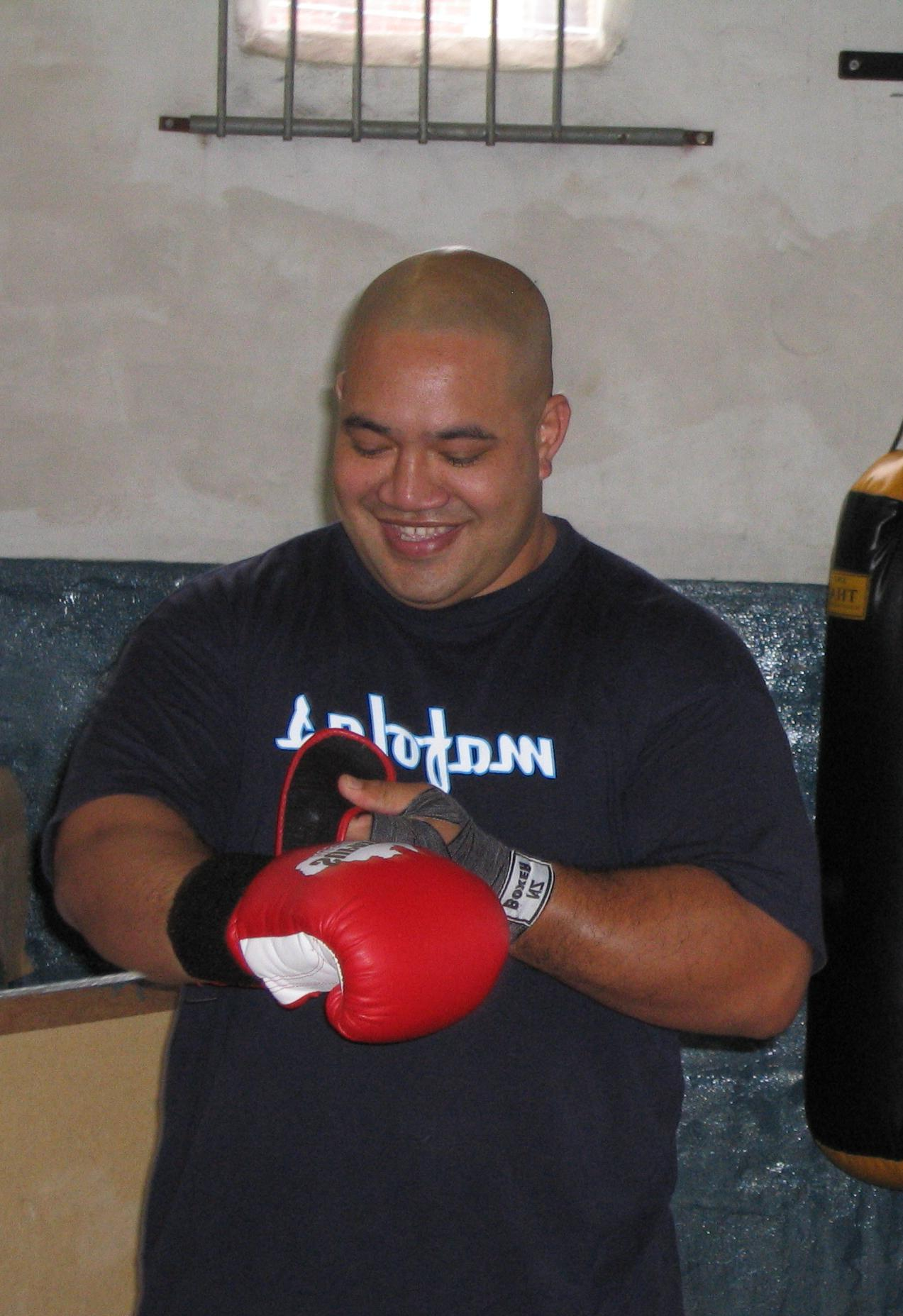
Star "The Rock of Niue" Tauasi

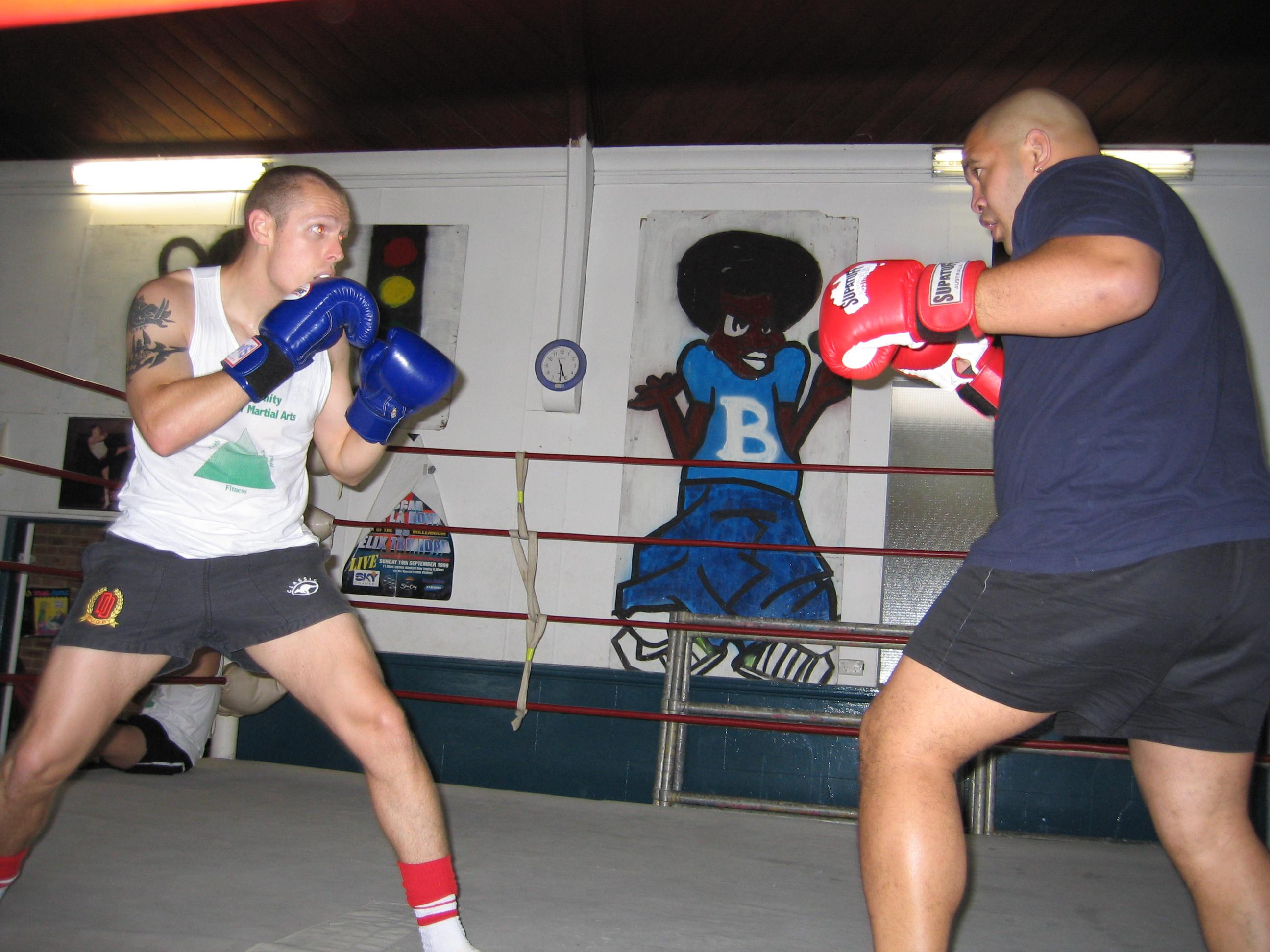
Star "The Rock of Niue" Tauasi sparring Owen Parry

Star "The Rock of Niue" Ohara Tauasi (born ~1975) is a Niuean boxer. He competed for Niue at the 2002 and 2006 Commonwealth Games, and at the 2003 South Pacific Games in Suva, Fiji, winning a bronze.

Tauasi took up boxing after injuring his knee playing rugby league.

== Boxing ==
- 1999 - Auckland Amateur Super Heavyweight Boxing Champion.
- 1999 – New Zealand Amateur Super Heavyweight Boxing Champion.
- 2000 - NZ Rep. Bronze Medallist. Oceania Boxing Championships & Olympic Trials AIS, Canberra
- 2001 - North Island, NZ, Golden Gloves Amateur Super Heavyweight Boxing Champion.
- 2002 - Represented Niue at Manchester Commonwealth Games - Knocked out "Demolition" David Turner (Australia) - Rnd 2, but lost by Majority Points Decision to eventual Gold Medal winner, David Dolan, from England.
- 2002 - Fought & stopped current NZ Amateur Super Heavyweight Boxing Champion Rnd 3
- 2003 - Bronze Medallist - South Pacific Games, Suva, Fiji.
- 2003 - Lost Majority Points Decision to current Amateur Super Heavyweight Boxing, Australia, Justin Whitehead of Victoria
- 2006 - Represented Niue at Melbourne Commonwealth Games. Lost by 1 point to Ghana, disputed but unsuccessful.
