= Uganda at the 2002 Commonwealth Games =

Sporting event delegation

Flag of Uganda

Uganda competed in the 2002 Commonwealth Games in Manchester. It was their eleventh time at the games. It sent 20 athletes (13 male, 7 female) across athletics, boxing, cycling, netball, rifle shooting, swimming, table tennis, and weightlifting. The 20 athletes who went for the games only two managed to win medals and both won silver medals in the boxing category. This strengthened Uganda's boxing history.

== Medals ==
	Gold	Silver	Bronze	Total
Uganda	0	2	0	2

== Gold ==
- None

== Silver ==
Boxing:

- Joseph Lubega Men's Light Heavyweight Division (81kg)
- Mohammed Kayongo Men's Light Welterweight Division (63.5kg)

== Bronze ==
- None
