= Anurudha Rathnayake =

Sri Lankan boxer (born 1975)

Anurudha Bandara Ratnayake (Sinhalese: අනුරුද්ධ බණ්ඩාර රත්නායක; Tamil: அனுருத பண்டார ரத்னாயகே; born 17 August 1975) is an Olympic boxer from Sri Lanka who lost his first match at the 2008 Summer Olympics in the flyweight division. He lost this game to Robenílson Vieira de Jesus from Brazil. See Boxing at the 2008 Summer Olympics – Flyweight
