= Neil Speaight =

British middle-distance runner

Personal information
- Nationality: British (English)
- Born: 9 September 1978 (age 48) Lincoln, England

Sport
- Sport: Athletics
- Event: middle-distance
- Club: Belgrave Harriers

Neil Anthony Speaight (born 9 September 1978) is a British former middle-distance runner.

== Biography ==
Speaight had a three year unbeaten sequence in the Southern Athletics league from 1996 to 1999.

He became the British 800 metres champion after winning the British AAA Championships title at the 2001 AAA Championships.

== Achievements ==
Year	Competition	Venue	Position	Event	Notes
Representing the United Kingdom
1999	European U23 Championships	Gothenburg, Sweden	7th (h)	800 m	1:48.42
2009	European Indoor Championships	Turin, Italy	9th	1500 m	3:51.04
