= Mohammed Kayongo =

American boxer

Personal information
- Nationality: Ugandan/American
- Born: 25 October 1980 (age 45) Kampala, Uganda
- Weight: Welterweight

Boxing career

Boxing record
- Total fights: 24
- Wins: 18
- Win by KO: 13
- Losses: 5
- Draws: 1
Medal record
Men's amateur boxing
Representing Uganda
Commonwealth Games
Silver medal – second place	2002 Manchester	Light welterweight

Mohammed Kayongo, nicknamed The African Assassin (born 25 October 1980), is a former Ugandan born professional boxer.

== Personal life ==
Kayongo was born in Kampala, Uganda. His current residence is Minneapolis, Minnesota.

== High school ==
Kayongo studied his O-lever (S1 - S4) at Kololo High School from 1993 to 1996, this is where he started his Boxing career. He represented his high school in inter-school and national opens. Mohammed Kayongo won a silver medal in the Men's Light Welterweight division at the 2002 Commonwealth Games in Manchester.

== Professional career ==
Kayongo began his career with a first-round knockout of Anthony Howard in April 2003, and had a perfect record through ten fights, before a draw against Jose Antonio Ojeda in July 2004. His first loss came in his twelfth fight, against undefeated Shamone Alvarez in November 2004. Kayongo's two career losses have come to unbeaten prospects Shamone Alvarez and Jose Leo Moreno.

Kayongo scored a fourth-round TKO against James Todd for the IBA welterweight world title on November 20, 2009

On January 19, 2013 Kayongo won a unanimous decision at the Minneapolis Convention Center in a six-round fight against Gilbert Venagas of East Moline, Illinois.

== See also ==
- Ugandan Americans
