= Kerron Speid =

Jamaican boxer (born 1972)

Personal information
- Born: May 24, 1972 (age 54)
Medal record
Men's Boxing
Representing Jamaica
Pan American Games
Bronze medal – third place	1999 Winnipeg	Heavyweight

Kerron Speid (born May 25, 1972) is a retired male boxer from Jamaica, who won the bronze medal in the heavyweight division at the 1999 Pan American Games in Winnipeg, Manitoba, Canada, together with Brazil's Marcelino Novaes.

Speid was a three-time Caribbean heavyweight amateur boxing champion, and he finished his career with a record of 28-4-0. He made his professional debut in 2002, winning the first bout with a third-round knockout of Ohio's Luis Depp in Philadelphia, and losing the second on points to Patrick Nuamu of New York.
