= Pembroke, Tobago =

Coordinates: 11.217°N 60.617°W

Pembroke is a small community in Tobago with a tropical climate. It has a noted waterfall within its heritage park.
