= Lechedzani Luza =

Botswana boxer (born 1978)

Personal information
- Full name: Lechedzani Luza
- Nickname: Master
- Nationality: Botswana
- Born: December 20, 1978 (age 47) Mbalambi, North East
- Height: 1.69 m (5 ft 7 in)
- Weight: 51 kg (112 lb)

Sport
- Sport: Boxing
- Weight class: Flyweight
- Club: UB Boxing Club
Medal record
Commonwealth Games
Silver medal – second place	2002 Manchester	Flyweight
African Amateur Championships
Silver medal – second place	2003 Yaoundé	Flyweight

Lechedzani Luza (born 20 December 1978) is a boxer from Botswana. At the 2002 Commonwealth Games, Luza took the silver medal. He took gold in 2004 at the 2nd Olympic Qualifying Tournament in Gaborone, Botswana, finally defeating Madagascar's Georges Rakotoarimbelo. He went on to the 2004 Summer Olympics in Athens, Greece, but Morocco's Hicham Mesbahi eliminated him in the first round of the men's flyweight (– 51 kg) division.
