= Denis Zimba =

Zambian boxer (born 1971)

Personal information
- Nationality: Zambian
- Born: 7 August 1971 (age 53)

Sport
- Sport: Boxing

Denis Zimba (born 7 August 1971) is a Zambian boxer. He competed in the men's lightweight event at the 1996 Summer Olympics.
