= 2008 European Athletics Indoor Cup – results =

These are the full results of the 2008 European Athletics Indoor Cup which was held on 16 February 2008 at the CSKA Universal Sports Hall in Moscow, Russia.

== Men's results ==
=== 60 metres ===
Rank	Lane	Name	Nationality	Time	Notes	Points
1	7	Łukasz Chyła	Poland	6.61		9
2	6	Andrey Yepishin	Russia	6.62	SB	7
3	8	Dmytro Hlushchenko	Ukraine	6.63	SB	6
4	5	Ronny Ostwald	Germany	6.71		5
5	4	Ángel David Rodríguez	Spain	6.73		4
6	3	Manuel Reynaert	France	6.76		3
7	2	Matteo Galvan	Italy	6.90		2
8	1	Joakim Blaschke	Sweden	7.02		1

=== 400 metres ===
Rank	Heat	Name	Nationality	Time	Notes	Points
1	1	Johan Wissman	Sweden	46.55		9
2	2	Claudio Licciardello	Italy	46.57	PB	7
3	1	Maksim Dyldin	Russia	46.60		6
4	1	Falco Lausecker	Germany	47.11		5
5	2	Myhaylo Knysh	Ukraine	47.18	PB	4
6	2	Mark Ujakpor	Spain	47.44	PB	3
7	1	Idrissa M'Barke	France	48.06	PB	2
8	2	Wojciech Chybiński	Poland	48.55		1

=== 800 metres ===
Rank	Name	Nationality	Time	Notes	Points
1	Luis Alberto Marco	Spain	1:49.58	SB	9
2	Livio Sciandra	Italy	1:49.73	SB	7
3	Yuriy Koldin	Russia	1:49.91		6
4	Mattias Claesson	Sweden	1:49.94		5
5	Paweł Czapiewski	Poland	1:50.62		4
6	René Herms	Germany	1:50.70		3
7	Jeff Lastennet	France	1:51.24	PB	2
8	Oleh Lobanov	Ukraine	1:51.51	SB	1

=== 1500 metres ===
Rank	Name	Nationality	Time	Notes	Points
1	Diego Ruiz	Spain	3:48.31		9
2	Christian Obrist	Italy	3:48.85		7
3	Bartosz Nowicki	Poland	3:49.02		6
4	Oleksandr Borysyuk	Ukraine	3:49.32		5
5	Stefan Eberhardt	Germany	3:50.54		4
6	Ramil Aritkulov	Russia	3:51.17		3
7	Yohan Durand	France	3:51.31		2
8	Olle Walleräng	Sweden	3:53.96		1

=== 3000 metres ===
Rank	Name	Nationality	Time	Notes	Points
1	Sergey Ivanov	Russia	8:16.02		9
2	Cosimo Caliandro	Italy	8:16.03		7
3	Sergio Sánchez	Spain	8:19.26		6
4	Noureddine Smaïl	France	8:21.16		5
5	Łukasz Parszczyński	Poland	8:25.34		4
6	Sebastian Hallmann	Germany	8:29.22		3
7	Vadym Slobodenyuk	Ukraine	8:33.15		2
	Henrik Skoog	Sweden	DNS		0

=== 60 metres hurdles ===
Rank	Lane	Name	Nationality	Time	Notes	Points
1	2	Yevgeniy Borisov	Russia	7.44	CR, EL, NR	9
2	8	Jackson Quiñónez	Spain	7.57	SB	7
3	1	Thomas Blaschek	Germany	7.71		6
4	5	Robert Kronberg	Sweden	7.73		5
5	3	Dominik Bochenek	Poland	7.88	PB	4
6	6	Emiliano Pizzoli	Italy	7.91		3
7	4	Oleksandr Shahov	Ukraine	7.96		2
8	7	Didier Lixfe	France	8.04	=SB	1

=== Swedish relay (800/600/400/200 metres) ===
Rank	Nation	Athletes	Time	Note	Points
1	Russia	Dmitriy Bogdanov, Yuriy Borzakovskiy, Vladislav Frolov, Roman Smirnov	4:10.58	CR	9
2	Germany	Robin Schembera, Steffen Co, Ingo Schultz, Stefan Kuhlee	4:12.07		7
3	Italy	Christian Neunhäuserer, Maurizio Bobbato, Domenico Rao, Matteo Galvan	4:15.91		6
4	Sweden	Rickard Pell, Fredrik Karlsson, Thomas Nikitin, Johan Wissman	4:16.35		5
5	France	Jean Baptiste Renaudie, Ismaël Koné, Mickaël François, Marc Macedot	4:19.23		4
6	Spain	Salvador Crespo, Daniel Ruiz, Luis Alberto Marco, Mark Ujakpor	4:23.37		3
	Poland	Rafał Snochowski, Piotr Dąbrowski, Piotr Klimczak, Kamil Masztak	DQ	R170.14	0
	Ukraine	Oleksandr Osmolovych, Maksym Zhudin, Dmytro Ostrovskyy, Ihor Bodrov	DQ	R170.10	0

=== Pole vault ===
Rank	Name	Nationality	5.10	5.25	5.40	5.50	5.60	5.65	5.70	5.80	Result	Notes	Points
1	Sergey Kucheryanu	Russia	–	o	o	o	xxo	o	–	xxx	5.65		9
2	Renaud Lavillenie	France	–	o	–	o	o	–	xxx		5.60		7
3	Tobias Scherbarth	Germany	–	o	xxo	o	xxx				5.50		6
4	Adam Kolasa	Poland	–	xo	xo	xxo	xxx				5.50	=SB	5
5	Denys Fedas	Ukraine	–	o	o	x–	xx				5.40		3
5	Javier Gazol	Spain	o	o	o	xxx					5.40		3
5	Giorgio Piantella	Italy	o	o	o	xxx					5.40		3
8	Jesper Fritz	Sweden	–	xo	xxx						5.25		1

=== Triple jump ===
Rank	Name	Nationality	#1	#2	#3	#4	Result	Notes	Points
1	Yevgeniy Plotnir	Russia	16.54	16.66	16.65	16.77	16.77		9
2	Andreas Pohle	Germany	15.73	15.91	16.43	x	16.43	SB	7
3	Viktor Yastrebov	Ukraine	16.01	16.16	16.34	16.30	16.34		6
4	Andrés Capellán	Spain	15.50	16.01	16.00	16.14	16.14	SB	5
5	Fabrizio Schembri	Italy	15.90	16.02	15.92	16.00	16.02		4
6	Anton Andersson	Sweden	x	15.75	15.87	15.93	15.93		3
7	Jacek Kazimierowski	Poland	15.53	15.75	15.41	15.83	15.83		2
8	Fabien Harmenil	France	14.80	15.68	15.63	15.38	15.68	PB	1

== Women's results ==
=== 60 metres ===
Rank	Lane	Name	Nationality	Time	Notes	Points
1	1	Svetlana Nabokina	Russia	7.24		9
2	8	Verena Sailer	Germany	7.26	PB	7
3	5	Hanna Bahdanovich	Belarus	7.31	=PB	6
4	3	Iwona Brzezińska	Poland	7.41		5
5	6	Iryna Shtanhyeyeva	Ukraine	7.43		4
6	7	Vincenza Calì	Italy	7.45		3
7	2	Natacha Vouaux	France	7.58	SB	2
8	4	Julia España	Spain	7.61		1

=== 400 metres ===
Rank	Heat	Name	Nationality	Time	Notes	Points
1	1	Olesya Zykina	Russia	51.91		9
2	1	Nataliya Pyhyda	Ukraine	52.42		7
3	1	Agnieszka Karpiesiuk	Poland	53.09	PB	6
4	2	Jonna Tilgner	Germany	53.87		5
5	2	Thélia Sigère	France	53.87	PB	4
6	2	Marta Milani	Italy	55.04		3
7	2	Susana Fernández	Spain	55.12	SB	2
8	1	Krystsina Viadzernikava	Belarus	56.18		1

=== 800 metres ===
Rank	Name	Nationality	Time	Notes	Points
1	Ewelina Sętowska-Dryk	Poland	2:01.50	PB	9
2	Elisa Cusma Piccione	Italy	2:01.73		7
3	Mayte Martínez	Spain	2:02.57		6
4	Mariya Shapayeva	Russia	2:03.13		5
5	Jana Hartmann	Germany	2:04.16		4
6	Zoya Hladun-Nesterenko	Ukraine	2:04.21		3
7	Carine Falhun	France	2:04.87	PB	2
8	Maryna Katovich	Belarus	2:05.47	=PB	1

=== 1500 metres ===
Rank	Name	Nationality	Time	Notes	Points
1	Olesya Chumakova	Russia	4:15.28		9
2	Esther Desviat	Spain	4:16.56		7
3	Natallia Kareiva	Belarus	4:16.74	PB	6
4	Antje Möldner	Germany	4:18.19	SB	5
5	Jennifer Lozano	France	4:19.29	PB	4
6	Anna Mishchenko	Ukraine	4:19.32	SB	3
7	Agnieszka Miernik	Poland	4:32.43		2
8	Chiara Nichetti	Italy	4:33.31		1

=== 3000 metres ===
Rank	Name	Nationality	Time	Notes	Points
1	Yelena Sidorchenkova	Russia	8:57.78		9
2	Silvia Weissteiner	Italy	8:58.94		7
3	Sabrina Mockenhaupt	Germany	9:00.26		6
4	Rosa María Morató	Spain	9:08.53		5
5	Renata Pliś	Poland	9:10.81		4
6	Oksana Sklyarenko	Ukraine	9:15.23	PB	3
7	Élodie Mouthon	France	9:23.67		2
8	Sviatlana Kudzelich	Belarus	9:54.25		1

=== 60 metres hurdles ===
Rank	Lane	Name	Nationality	Time	Notes	Points
1	8	Josephine Onyia	Spain	7.93	CR	9
2	1	Yauhenia Valadzko	Belarus	8.07		7
3	5	Tatyana Dektyareva	Russia	8.10		6
4	3	Micol Cattaneo	Italy	8.11		5
5	4	Judith Ritz	Germany	8.16		4
6	6	Aurore Ruet	France	8.41		3
7	7	Kaja Tokarska	Poland	8.45		2
8	2	Nataliya Zabrodska	Ukraine	8.53		1

=== Swedish relay (800/600/400/200 metres) ===
Rank	Nation	Athletes	Time	Note	Points
1	Russia	Tatyana Paliyenko, Tatyana Firova, Yuliya Gushchina, Anastasiya Kapachinskaya	4:43.22		9
2	Belarus	Sviatlana Usovich, Iryna Khliustava, Anna Kozak, Anastasia Shuliak	4:48.25		7
3	Poland	Agnieszka Sowińska, Małgorzata Pskit, Grażyna Prokopek, Marta Jeschke	4:53.23		6
4	Spain	Margarita Fuentes-Pila, Elián Périz, Laia Forcadell, Julia España	4:54.86		5
5	Ukraine	Anzhela Shevchenko, Nataliya Lupu, Anastasiya Rabchenyuk, Iryna Shtanhyeyeva	4:56.12		4
6	Italy	Elisa Cusma Piccione, Antonella Riva, Eleonora Sirtoli, Giulia Arcioni	4:56.44		3
7	Germany	Julia Hiller, Jonna Tilgner, Sorina Nwachukwu, Katharina Naumann	4:56.93		2
8	France	Laura Tavares, Marine Vialle Taverne, Marie Lacordelle, Élodie Barre	5:00.09		1

=== High jump ===
Rank	Name	Nationality	1.70	1.75	1.80	1.85	1.89	1.92	1.95	1.98	2.00	2.02	Result	Notes	Points
1	Ariane Friedrich	Germany	–	–	–	o	–	o	o	xo	xxo	xxx	2.00	=CR	9
2	Ruth Beitia	Spain	–	–	o	–	o	xo	o	xo	xxx		1.98	=SB	7
3	Tatyana Kivimägi	Russia	–	o	o	o	o	o	o	xxx			1.95		6
4	Antonietta Di Martino	Italy	–	–	o	o	o	o	xxx				1.92		5
5	Olena Holosha	Ukraine	–	o	o	o	o	xxx					1.89		4
6	Kamila Stepaniuk	Poland	–	o	o	o	xo	xxx					1.89	PB	3
7	Volha Chuprova	Belarus	o	o	xxo	xxx							1.80		2
8	Marion Parmentier	France	o	xxo	xxx								1.75	SB	1

=== Long jump ===
Rank	Name	Nationality	#1	#2	#3	#4	Result	Notes	Points
1	Lyudmila Kolchanova	Russia	6.59	6.55	6.48	6.60	6.60		9
2	Concepción Montaner	Spain	x	x	6.57	6.49	6.57		7
3	Viktoriya Rybalko	Ukraine	6.44	6.51	x	6.42	6.51		6
4	Veranika Shutkova	Belarus	6.32	6.44	x	6.29	6.44		5
5	Małgorzata Trybańska	Poland	6.31	6.23	6.36	x	6.36		4
6	Valeria Canella	Italy	6.02	x	6.33	6.34	6.34		3
7	Melanie Bauschke	Germany	6.34	6.29	x	6.29	6.34		2
8	Amélie Auge	France	6.17	6.17	x	x	6.17		1

=== Shot put ===
Rank	Name	Nationality	#1	#2	#3	#4	Result	Notes	Points
1	Denise Hinrichs	Germany	17.84	17.25	17.73	17.48	17.84	SB	9
2	Assunta Legnante	Italy	17.58	17.74	x	17.24	17.74		7
3	Oksana Gaus	Russia	16.79	17.27	x	16.37	17.27		6
4	Yulia Leantsiuk	Belarus	16.32	17.06	x	16.23	17.06		5
5	Magdalena Sobieszek	Poland	x	16.32	x	16.18	16.32		4
6	Jessica Cérival	France	15.85	x	15.84	x	15.85	SB	3
7	Viktoriya Dehtyar	Ukraine	13.86	15.04	15.26	14.70	15.26		2
8	Irache Quintanal	Spain	x	14.84	x	x	14.84		1
