= 1998 World Junior Championships in Athletics – Men's 1500 metres =

The men's 1500 metres event at the 1998 World Junior Championships in Athletics was held in Annecy, France, at Parc des Sports on 31 July and 2 August.

== Medalists ==
Gold	Adil Kaouch; Morocco
Silver	Benjamin Kipkurui; Kenya
Bronze	Robert Witt; Poland

== Results ==
=== Final ===
2 August

Rank	Name	Nationality	Time	Notes
1st place, gold medalist(s)	Adil Kaouch	Morocco	3:42.43	
2nd place, silver medalist(s)	Benjamin Kipkurui	Kenya	3:42.67	
3rd place, bronze medalist(s)	Robert Witt	Poland	3:43.47	
4	Kiyoharo Sato	Japan	3:43.62	
5	Gabe Jennings	United States	3:43.94	
6	Colm McLean	Ireland	3:44.79	
7	Alastair Stevenson	Australia	3:45.39	
8	Nelson Birgen	Kenya	3:45.42	
9	Hicham Lamalem	Morocco	3:45.71	
10	Daniel Zegeye	Ethiopia	3:46.45	
11	Ivan Heshko	Ukraine	3:46.71	
12	Michael Öhman	Sweden	3:47.04	
13	Franek Haschke	Germany	3:47.10	
14	Hamish Thorpe	New Zealand	3:51.80	

=== Heats ===
31 July

==== Heat 1 ====
Rank	Name	Nationality	Time	Notes
1	Gabe Jennings	United States	3:47.76	Q
2	Kiyoharo Sato	Japan	3:48.27	Q
3	Colm McLean	Ireland	3:49.64	Q
4	Florent Lacasse	France	3:51.48	
5	Maurizio Bobbato	Italy	3:54.14	
6	Lucky Hadebe	South Africa	3:58.37	
7	Daniel Moham Lekunutu	Lesotho	3:58.53	
8	Franek Haschke	Germany	4:04.61	q
9	Sidi Mohamed Ould Bidjel	Mauritania	4:13.46	
10	Cheng Pisey	Cambodia	4:40.80	
	Yousef El-Nasri	Spain	DQ	IAAF rule 163.2
	Paul Fenn	Australia	DQ	IAAF rule 163.2

==== Heat 2 ====
Rank	Name	Nationality	Time	Notes
1	Benjamin Kipkurui	Kenya	3:50.89	Q
2	Hamish Thorpe	New Zealand	3:52.17	Q
3	Alastair Stevenson	Australia	3:52.26	Q
4	Mechal Gebreab	Ethiopia	3:52.57	
5	Nacer Benzine	Algeria	3:53.46	
6	Slavko Petrović	Croatia	3:54.17	
7	Filipe Pedro	Portugal	3:55.09	
8	Enos Matalane	South Africa	3:55.42	
9	Mohamed Al-Bayed	Palestine	3:56.03	
10	Daniel Abicht	Germany	3:58.70	
11	Hicham Lamalem	Morocco	5:25.07	q

==== Heat 3 ====
Rank	Name	Nationality	Time	Notes
1	Adil Kaouch	Morocco	3:45.79	Q
2	Nelson Birgen	Kenya	3:46.60	Q
3	Robert Witt	Poland	3:46.79	Q
4	Ivan Heshko	Ukraine	3:46.93	q
5	Michael Öhman	Sweden	3:49.51	q
6	Daniel Zegeye	Ethiopia	3:49.93	q
7	Steven Barrus	United States	3:50.04	
8	Chris Bolt	United Kingdom	3:52.10	
9	Roberto Castro	Spain	3:53.89	
10	Kamardin Andriantambezina	Madagascar	3:59.13	
11	Kezang Dorji	Bhutan	4:59.11	

== Participation ==
According to an unofficial count, 34 athletes from 26 countries participated in the event.

- Algeria (1)
- Australia (2)
- Bhutan (1)
- Cambodia (1)
- Croatia (1)
- Ethiopia (2)
- France (1)
- Germany (2)
- Ireland (1)
- Italy (1)
- Japan (1)
- Kenya (2)
- Lesotho (1)
- Madagascar (1)
- Mauritania (1)
- Morocco (2)
- New Zealand (1)
- Palestine (1)
- Poland (1)
- Portugal (1)
- South Africa (2)
- Spain (2)
- Sweden (1)
- Ukraine (1)
- United Kingdom (1)
- United States (2)
