= 2008 European Athletics Indoor Cup =

Sporting event in Moscow, Russia

- Host city: Moscow, Russia
- Events: 19
- Dates: 16 February
- Main venue: CSKA Universal Sports Hall

The 2008 European Athletics Indoor Cup was held on 16 February 2008 at the CSKA Universal Sports Hall in Moscow, Russia. It was the fourth and final edition of the indoor track and field meeting for international teams, which featured the six top performing nations from the 2007 European Cup and the top two from the European Cup First League. Great Britain and Northern Ireland did not send either a men's or women's team and they were replaced by Ukraine and Spain, respectively. The men's team from Greece also opted not to participate and they were replaced by Sweden (the third best finisher in the 2007 European A League). The host nation won both the men's and women's competitions.

The competition featured nineteen athletics events, nine for men and ten for women. The 400 metres race were held in a dual final format due to size constraints, with athletes' being assigned final positions through their finishing times. The international team points totals were decided by their athletes' finishing positions, with each representative's performance contributing towards their national overall score.

Russia came first the men's competition, winning five of the nine events and having eighteen points to spare over second-placed Spain. Yevgeniy Borisov was one of the team's best performers as he won the 60 metres hurdles in a Russian record time of 7.44 seconds. The Russian women's team was even more dominant than their male counterparts as the team went on to continue their undefeated streak, winning six of the ten women's events and finishing 24 points clear of the runner-up Germany.

The French women became the first team to finish the competition without winning a single event, although their points total of 23 was one higher than the record low (Sweden in 2006).

== Results summary ==
=== Men ===
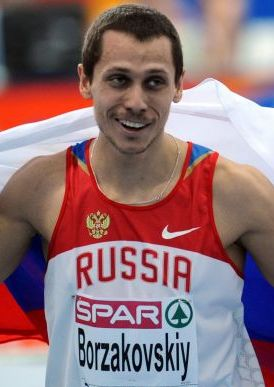
The 2004 Olympic champion Yuriy Borzakovskiy was one of the meetings most prominent stars.

Event	Gold		Silver		Bronze	
60 metres	Łukasz Chyła (POL)	6.61	Andrey Yepishin (RUS)	6.62	Dmytro Hlushchenko (UKR)	6.63
400 metres	Johan Wissman (SWE)	46.55	Claudio Licciardello (ITA)	46.57	Maksim Dyldin (RUS)	46.60
800 metres	Luis Alberto Marco (ESP)	1:49.58	Livio Sciandra (ITA)	1:49.73	Yuriy Koldin (RUS)	1:49.91
1500 metres	Diego Ruiz (ESP)	3:48.31	Christian Obrist (ITA)	3:48.85	Bartosz Nowicki (POL)	3:49.02
3000 metres	Sergey Ivanov (RUS)	8:16.02	Cosimo Caliandro (ITA)	8:16.03	Sergio Sánchez (ESP)	8:19.26
60 metres hurdles	Yevgeniy Borisov (RUS)	7.44 NR	Jackson Quiñónez (ESP)	7.57	Thomas Blaschek (GER)	7.71
Swedish relay (800/600/400/200 m)	Russia (RUS); Dmitriy Bogdanov; Yuriy Borzakovskiy; Vladislav Frolov; Roman Smirnov	4:10.58	Germany (GER); Robin Schembera; Steffen Co; Ingo Schultz; Stefan Kuhlee	4:12.07	Italy (ITA); Christian Neunhäuserer; Maurizio Bobbato; Domenico Rao; Matteo Galvan	4:15.91
Pole vault	Sergey Kucheryanu (RUS)	5.65 m	Renaud Lavillenie (FRA)	5.60 m	Tobias Scherbarth (GER)	5.50 m
Triple jump	Yevgeniy Plotnir (RUS)	16.77 m	Andreas Pohle (GER)	16.43 m	Viktor Yastrebov (UKR)	16.34 m

=== Women ===
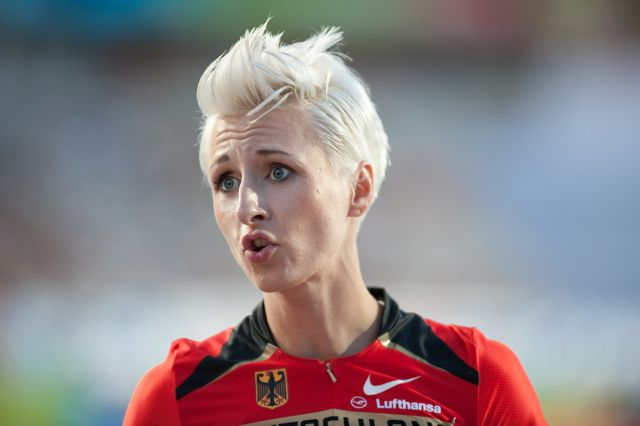
Germany's Ariane Friedrich won the high jump.

Event	Gold		Silver		Bronze	
60 metres	Svetlana Nabokina (RUS)	7.24	Verena Sailer (GER)	7.26	Anna Bahdanovich (BLR)	7.31
400 metres	Olesya Zykina (RUS)	51.91	Nataliya Pyhyda (UKR)	52.42	Agnieszka Karpiesiuk (POL)	53.09
800 metres	Ewelina Sętowska-Dryk (POL)	2:01.50	Elisa Cusma Piccione (ITA)	2:01.73	Mayte Martínez (ESP)	2:02.57
1500 metres	Olesya Chumakova (RUS)	4:15.28	Esther Desviat (ESP)	4:16.56	Natallia Kareiva (BLR)	4:16.74
3000 metres	Yelena Sidorchenkova (RUS)	8:57.78	Silvia Weissteiner (ITA)	8:58.94	Sabrina Mockenhaupt (GER)	9:00.26
60 metres hurdles	Josephine Onyia (ESP)	7.93	Yauhenia Valadzko (BLR)	8.07	Tatyana Dektyareva (RUS)	8.10
Swedish relay (800/600/400/200 m)	Russia (RUS); Tatyana Paliyenko; Tatyana Firova; Yuliya Gushchina; Anastasiya Kapachinskaya	4:43.22	Belarus (BLR); Sviatlana Usovich; Iryna Khliustava; Anna Kozak; Anastasia Shuliak	4:48.25	Poland (POL); Agnieszka Sowińska; Małgorzata Pskit; Grażyna Prokopek; Marta Jeschke	4:53.23
High jump	Ariane Friedrich (GER)	2.00 m	Ruth Beitia (ESP)	1.98 m	Tatyana Kivimyagi (RUS)	1.95 m
Long jump	Lyudmila Kolchanova (RUS)	6.60 m	Concepción Montaner (ESP)	6.57 m	Viktoriya Rybalko (UKR)	6.51 m
Shot put	Denise Hinrichs (GER)	17.84 m	Assunta Legnante (ITA)	17.74 m	Oksana Gaus (RUS)	17.27 m

== Medal table ==
Key

The host country is highlighted in lavender blue

Men
Rank	Nation	Points total	Gold	Silver	Bronze	Medal total
1	Russia	67	5	1	2	8
2	Spain	49	2	1	1	4
3	Italy	46	0	4	1	5
4	Germany	46	0	2	2	4
5	Poland	35	1	0	1	2
6	Sweden	30	1	0	0	1
7	Ukraine	29	0	0	2	2
8	France	27	0	1	0	1
Total			9	9	9	27

Women
Rank	Nation	Points total	Gold	Silver	Bronze	Medal total
1	Russia	77	6	0	3	9
2	Germany	53	2	1	1	4
3	Spain	50	1	3	1	5
4	Poland	45	1	0	2	3
5	Italy	44	0	3	0	3
6	Belarus	41	0	2	2	4
7	Ukraine	37	0	1	1	2
8	France	23	0	0	0	0
Total			10	10	10	30
