= Salvatore Vincenti =

Italian middle-distance runner

Personal information
- Nationality: Italian
- Born: 5 March 1972 (age 54)

Sport
- Country: Italy
- Sport: Athletics
- Event: Middle-distance running

Achievements and titles
- Personal bests: 1500 m: 3.38.63 (1998); 5000 m: 13:22.00 (2000)
Medal record
European Cup
Gold medal – first place	1999 Paris	3000 m
European Indoor Cup
Bronze medal – third place	2004 Leipzig	3000 m
European Athletics U23 Cup
Gold medal – first place	1994 Ostrava	1500 m

Salvatore Vincenti (born 5 March 1972) is an Italian male retired middle-distance runner, who won a gold medal at international senior level at the 1999 European Cup. He also participated at the 1999 World Championship in Athletics.

== Biography ==
Vincenti also participated at two editions of the IAAF World Cross Country Championships (1999, 2002) at individual senior level.

== Achievements ==
Year	Competition	Venue	Position	Event	Performance	Notes
1999	European Cup	(France) Paris	1st	3000 m	7:59.12	
1999	World Championships	(Spain) Sevilla	Heat	5000 m	14:03.36	
2000	European Indoor Championships	(Belgium) Ghent	21st	3000 m	8:13.64	
2002	European Championships	(Germany) Munich	8th	5000 m	13:50.53	
2003	World Indoor Championships	(United Kingdom) Birmingham	16th	1500 m	3:45.93	
2004	European Indoor Cup	(Germany) Leipzig	3rd	3000 m	7:51.59	

== National titles ==
He won 7 national championships at individual senior level.

- Italian Athletics Championships
  - 5000 metres: 2001, 2002, 2003
- Italian Indoor Athletics Championships
  - 1500 metres: 1999, 2003
  - 3000 metres: 2001, 2004

== See also ==
- Italy at the European Cup
