= Athletics at the 2003 All-Africa Games – Men's 1500 metres =

The men's 1500 metres at the 2003 All-Africa Games were held on October 15.

== Results ==
Rank	Name	Nationality	Time	Notes
1st place, gold medalist(s)	Paul Korir	Kenya	3:37.52	
2nd place, silver medalist(s)	Robert Rono	Kenya	3:38.13	
3rd place, bronze medalist(s)	Benjamin Kipkurui	Kenya	3:38.94	
4	Daniel Zegeye	Ethiopia	3:41.23	
5	Peter Roko Ashak	Sudan	3:42.18	
6	Samwel Mwera	Tanzania	3:45.76	
7	Abdalla Abdelgadir	Sudan	3:47.67	
8	Seifu Nebse	Ethiopia	3:48.45	
9	Samual Dado	Ethiopia	3:48.65	
10	Ali Abdela	Eritrea	3:48.78	
11	Francis Munthali	Malawi	3:52.66	
12	Abdoulaye Abdelkerim	Chad	4:17.46	
	Cheik Salou	Burkina Faso	DNS	
	Fofana Sory	Guinea	DNS	
