= 1999 European Cup (athletics) =

- Dates: 19–20 June (Super Leagues)
- Host city: Paris, France
- Level: Senior
- Type: Outdoor
- Events: 39

The 1999 European Cup was the 20th edition of the European Cup of athletics.

The Super League Finals were held in Paris, France.

== Super Leagues ==
Held on 19 and 20 June in Paris, France

=== Team standings ===
Men
Pos.	Nation	Points
1	Germany	122
2	Italy	98.5
3	Great Britain	97
4	Russia	95
5	France	81.5
6	Greece	80
7	Poland	79
8	Czech Republic	62

Women
Place	Pays	Points
1	Russia	127
2	Romania	99
3	France	97
4	Germany	93.5
5	Italy	71
6	Great Britain	68.5
7	Poland	65
8	Czech Republic	62

=== Results summary ===
==== Men's events ====
Event	Gold		Silver		Bronze	
100 m (Wind: -0.8 m/s)	Dwain Chambers; Great Britain	10.21	Stefano Tilli; Italy	10.32	Piotr Balcerzak; Poland	10.35
200 m (Wind: +0.2 m/s)	Marcin Urbaś; Poland	20.34	Alexis Alexopoulos; Greece	20.36	Julian Golding; Great Britain	20.49
400 m	Mark Richardson; Great Britain	44.96	Dmitriy Golovastov; Russia	45.59	Konstantinos Kenteris; Greece	45.66
800 m	Yuriy Borzakovskiy; Russia	1:48.53	Nico Motchebon; Germany	1:48.75	Roman Oravec; Czech Republic	1:48.87
1500 m	Giuseppe D'Urso; Italy	3:46.01	Rüdiger Stenzel; Germany	3:46.58	Nadir Bosch; France	3:46.75
3000 m	Salvatore Vincenti; Italy	7:59.12	Vyacheslav Shabunin; Russia	7:59.12	Driss Maazouzi; France	7:59.52
5000 m	Gennaro Di Napoli; Italy	13:53.37	Halez Taguelmint; France	13:57.35	Sergey Drygin; Russia	14:00.99
3000 m steeplechase	Gaël Pencréach; France	8:27.78	Damian Kallabis; Germany	8:27.85	Giuseppe Maffei; Italy	8:27.94
110 m hurdles (Wind: +0.5 m/s)	Falk Balzer; Germany	13.21	Tony Jarrett; Great Britain	13.31	Tomasz Ścigaczewski; Poland	13.48
400 m hurdles	Fabrizio Mori; Italy	48.68	Thomas Goller; Germany	48.88	Paweł Januszewski; Poland	48.94
4 × 100 m	Great Britain; Jason Gardener; Darren Campbell; Marlon Devonish; Julian Golding	38.16; CR	Greece; Vasilios Seggos; Alexios Alexopoulos; Georgios Panagiotopoulos; Christoforos Choidis	38.61; NR	Germany; Alexander Kosenkow; Patrick Schneider; Holger Blume; Christian Schacht	38.88
4 × 400 m	Great Britain; Mark Hylton; Jamie Baulch; Solomon Wariso; Mark Richardson	3:00.61	Poland; Piotr Rysiukiewicz; Robert Maćkowiak; Tomasz Czubak; Piotr Haczek	3:01.06	Russia; Daniyil Shekin; Mikhail Vdovin; Andrey Semyonov; Dmitriy Golovastov	3:01.57
High jump	Martin Buss; Germany	2.34	Vyacheslav Voronin; Russia	2.32	Tomáš Janku; Czech Republic	2.25
Pole vault	Michael Stolle; Germany	5.65	Rodion Gataullin; Russia	5.45	Štěpán Janáček; Czech Republic	5.45
Long jump	Emmanuel Bangué; France	7.97	Kofi Amoah Prah; Germany	7.85	Roberto Coltri; Italy	7.85
Triple jump	Denis Kapustin; Russia	17.40	Jonathan Edwards; Great Britain	17.24	Charles Friedek; Germany	16.97
Shot put	Oliver-Sven Buder; Germany	20.53	Paolo Dal Soglio; Italy	19.38	Vaios Tigas; Greece	18.71
Discus throw	Jürgen Schult; Germany	65.68	Aleksandr Borichevskiy; Russia	63.26	Diego Fortuna; Italy	63.03
Hammer throw	Christos Polychroniou; Greece	79.72	Szymon Ziółkowski; Poland	78.67	Karsten Kobs; Germany	78.18
Javelin throw	Raymond Hecht; Germany	89.92	Sergey Makarov; Russia	85.44	Kostas Gatsioudis; Greece	84.87
WR world record | AR area record | CR championship record | GR games record | NR national record | OR Olympic record | PB personal best | SB season best | WL world leading (in a given season)

==== Women's events ====
Event	Gold		Silver		Bronze	
100 m (Wind: +0.5 m/s)	Christine Arron; France	10.97	Natalya Ignatova; Russia	11.22	Joice Maduaka; Great Britain	11.24
200 m (Wind: +0.7 m/s)	Svetlana Goncharenko; Russia	22.59	Sabrina Mulrain; Germany	22.73	Muriel Hurtis; France	22.83
400 m	Ionela Tîrlea; Romania	50.69	Olga Kotlyarova; Russia	51.19	Anja Rücker; Germany	51.28
800 m	Natalya Tsyganova; Russia	1:58.18	Helena Fuchsová; Czech Republic	1:58.81	Viviane Dorsile; France	2:00.37
1500 m	Gabriela Szabo; Romania	4:13.63	Anna Jakubczak; Poland	4:13.90	Margarita Marusova; Russia	4:15.40
3000 m	Gabriela Szabo; Romania	8:36.35	Lidia Chojecka; Poland	8:38.77	Olga Yegorova; Russia	8:40.51
5000 m	Paula Radcliffe; Great Britain	14:48.79; CR	Irina Mikitenko; Germany	15:05.43	Iulia Olteanu; Romania	15:06.73
100 m hurdles (Wind: -0.4 m/s)	Patricia Girard; France	12.96	Keri Maddox; Great Britain	12.97	Svetlana Laukhova; Russia	12.99
400 m hurdles	Silvia Rieger; Germany	55.09	Yekaterina Bakhvalova; Russia	55.61	Monika Niederstätter; Italy	56.09
4 × 100 m	France; Patricia Girard; Muriel Hurtis; Fabé Dia; Christine Arron	42.90	Russia; Natalya Ignatova; Oksana Ekk; Irina Khabarova; Svetlana Goncharenko	42.91	Germany; Gabi Rockmeier; Andrea Philipp; Birgit Rockmeier; Sabrina Mulrain	43.47
4 × 400 m	Russia; Yekaterina Kulikova; Natalya Nazarova; Tatyana Chebykina; Olga Kotlyarova	3:24.61	Romania; Otilia Ruicu; Alina Rîpanu; Ana Maria Barbu; Ionela Târlea	3:25.68	Czech Republic; Jitka Burianová; Hana Benešová; Denisa Krejcová; Helena Fuchsová	3:25.76
High jump	Yelena Gulyayeva; Russia	1.99	Monica Dinescu; Romania	1.97	Zuzana Hlavonová; Czech Republic	1.95
Pole vault	Nicole Humbert; Germany	4.35	Marie Poissonnier; France	4.30	Pavla Hamácková; Czech Republic	4.25
Long jump	Fiona May; Italy	6.88	Eunice Barber; France	6.82	Lyudmila Galkina; Russia	6.66
Triple jump	Cristina Nicolau; Romania	14.61	Ashia Hansen; Great Britain	14.58	Fiona May; Italy	14.33
Shot put	Krystyna Zabawska; Poland	18.58	Nadine Kleinert; Germany	18.47	Svetlana Krivelyova; Russia	18.36
Discus throw	Natalya Sadova; Russia	66.84	Nicoleta Grasu; Romania	65.85	Franka Dietzsch; Germany	65.72
Hammer throw	Mihaela Melinte; Romania	74.48; CR	Olga Kuzenkova; Russia	69.05	Florence Ezeh; France	65.64
Javelin throw	Tanja Damaske; Germany	65.44	Oksana Makarova; Russia	64.61	Nadine Auzeil; France	61.08
WR world record | AR area record | CR championship record | GR games record | NR national record | OR Olympic record | PB personal best | SB season best | WL world leading (in a given season)

== First League ==
The First League was held on 5 and 6 June

=== Men ===
Group A
Held in Lahti, Finland

Pos.	Nation	Points
1	Sweden	104
2	Ukraine	101
3	Netherlands	98
4	Finland	92
5	Norway	86
6	Belgium	84
7	Ireland	80
8	Belarus	73

Group B
Held in Athens, Greece

Pos.	Nation	Points
1	Hungary	122
2	Spain	111
3	Slovenia	95
4	Switzerland	94
5	Romania	92
6	Austria	73
7	Yugoslavia	69
8	Cyprus	63

=== Women ===
Group A
Held in Lahti, Finland

Pos.	Nation	Points
1	Ukraine	125
2	Belarus	107
3	Finland	100
4	Netherlands	93
5	Sweden	75
6	Ireland	74
7	Belgium	64
8	Denmark	47

Group B
Held in Athens, Greece

Pos.	Nation	Points
1	Greece	119
2	Hungary	101
3	Bulgaria	100
4	Spain	92
5	Switzerland	84
6	Slovenia	71
7	Yugoslavia	58
8	Turkey	57

== Second League ==
The Second League was held on 5 and 6 June

=== Men ===
Group A
Held in Pula, Croatia

Pos.	Nation	Points
1	Croatia	101
2	Denmark	99
3	Slovenia	99
4	Latvia	98
5	Lithuania	71.5
6	Iceland	57
7	Luxembourg	30

Group B
Held in Tel Aviv, Israel

Pos.	Nation	Points
1	Portugal	134
2	Bulgaria	107
3	Estonia	104
4	Israel	102
5	Turkey	94
6	Moldova	85
7	AASSE	51
8	Armenia	33

=== Women ===
Group A
Held in Pula, Croatia

Pos.	Nation	Points
1	Norway	124
2	Croatia	107
3	Slovenia	100
4	Latvia	99
5	Lithuania	94
6	Iceland	84
7	Albania	41.5
9	Luxembourg	28.5

Group B
Held in Tel Aviv, Israel

Pos.	Nation	Points
1	Portugal	129
2	Austria	110
3	Estonia	105
4	Israel	83
5	Cyprus	79
6	Moldova	76
7	Georgia	52
8	Armenia	35
