= Viktoriya Rybalko =

Ukrainian long jumper (born 1982)

Personal information
- Born: 26 October 1982 (age 43)
- Height: 1.8 m (5 ft 11 in)
- Weight: 63 kg (139 lb)

Sport
- Country: Ukraine
- Sport: Athletics
- Event: Long jump
Medal record
Women's athletics
Representing Ukraine
European Indoor Cup
Bronze medal – third place	2008 Moscow	Long jump
European Youth Olympic Festival
Silver medal – second place	1999 Esbjerg	Long jump

Viktoriya Rybalko (born 26 October 1982) is a Ukrainian long jumper. She was born in track-and-field student-athlete's family in Dnepropetrovsk, Ukraine. Her parents decided to name her Victoria - meaning victory. Vika spent her childhood in Moldova after her parents moved there for a job. Her school years started back in Ukraine, where she started her first grade in Zaporozhye, Ukraine. Viktoriya's track-and-field career started when her parents took her to meet her first coach (Telegin Vasiliy Ivanovich) at the age of 11.

First international appearance in long jump was in the summer of 1999 with a second-place finish at the Youth Olympic Days in Denmark. In the fall of 1999, Vika left Ukraine to attend the University of Maine, Orono, US, at the age of 17. Her university carrier was highlighted by placing second in long jump at the NCAA Division I Championships and winning the prestigious Dean Smith's award as a top student-athlete.

Viktoriya was inducted to the University of Maine Hall of Fame in 2008. On the professional arena Viktoriya finished fourth at the 2006 and 2010 European Athletics Championships and seventh at the 2007 European Athletics Indoor Championships. She was 11th at the World Championships in Osaka, Japan in 2007 and 8th at the Indoor World Championships in Doha, Qatar. She competed in 2008 Olympic Games in Beijing.

Academically, Viktoriya received B.S. Degree in Microbiology and Biochemistry from the University of Maine at Orono, Maine, and M.S. Degree from the University of Rochester, New York in Immunology/Microbiology. She is currently in the process of working towards her Ph.D. Degree in Exercise Physiology from the University of Texas, Austin, Texas.

Her personal best jump is 6.95 meters, achieved in 2012 in Yalta. In that year, she also competed at the 2012 Summer Olympics.
