= Benjamin Kipkurui =

Kenyan middle-distance runner

Benjamin Kipkurui (born 28 December 1980 in Molo) is a Kenyan runner who specializes in the 1500 metres. He holds the world junior record in 1000 metres with 2:15.00 minutes, achieved on 17 July 1999 in Nice.

He belongs to the Kipsigis tribe.

== Achievements ==
Year	Competition	Venue	Position	Event	Notes
Representing Kenya
1998	World Junior Championships	Annecy, France	2nd	1500m	3:42.67
2000	IAAF Grand Prix Final	Doha, Qatar	4th	1500m	3:37.38
2003	All-Africa Games	Abuja, Nigeria	3rd	1500m	3:38.94
2003	World Athletics Final	Monte Carlo, Monaco	8th	1500m	3:42.27

=== Personal bests ===
- 800 metres - 1:44.56 min (1999)
- 1500 metres - 3:30.67 min (2001)
- One mile - 3:49.34 min (2000)
