= 2004 European Athletics Indoor Cup =

Sporting event in Leipzig, Germany

- Host city: Leipzig, Germany
- Events: 19
- Dates: 14 February
- Main venue: Arena Leipzig

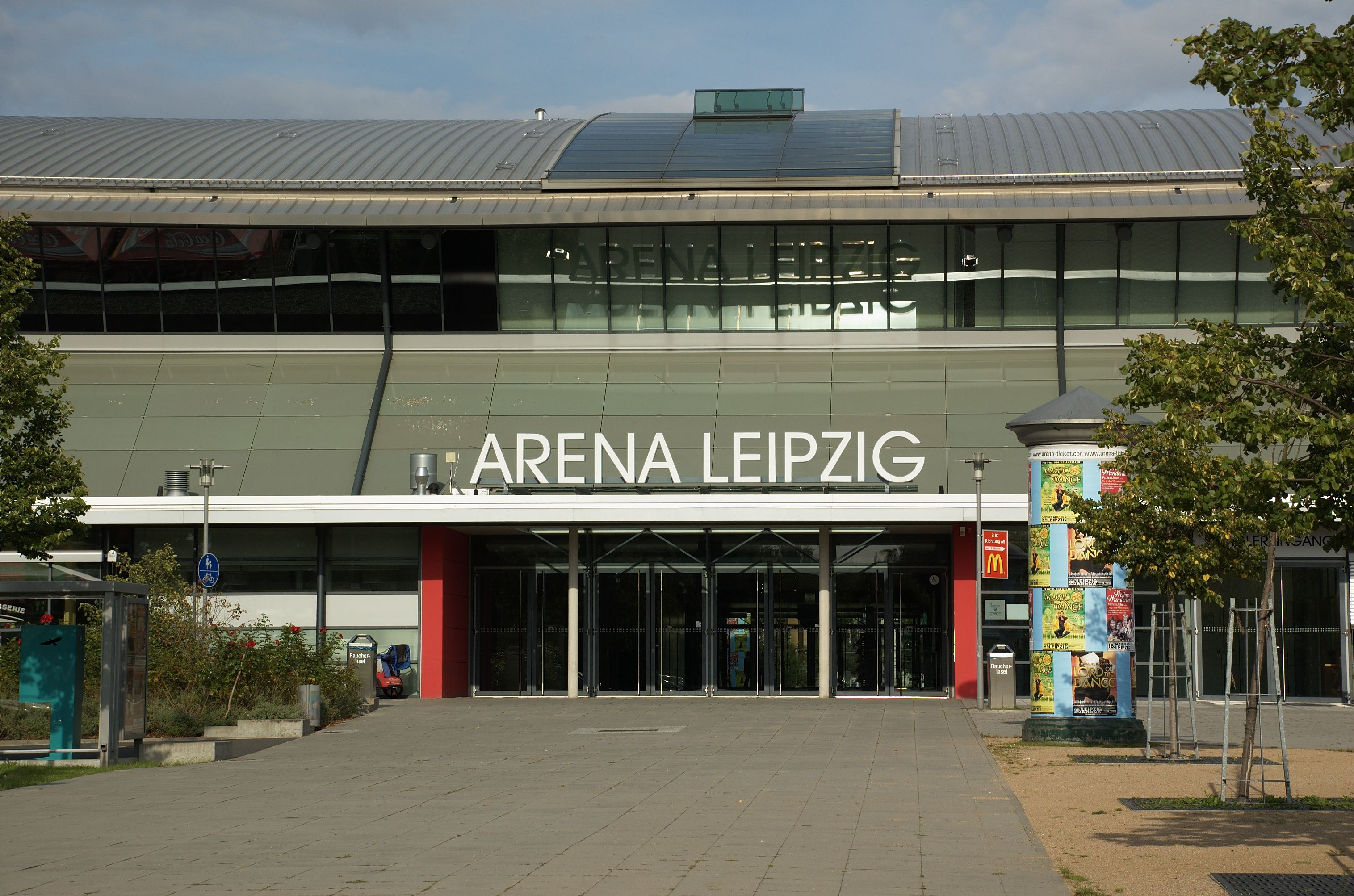
The Arena Leipzig hosted the event for a second year running.

The 2004 European Athletics Indoor Cup was held on 14 February 2004 at the Arena Leipzig in Leipzig, Germany. It was the second edition of the indoor track and field meeting for international teams, which featured the eight top performing nations from the 2003 European Cup. It was the second consecutive year that the event was held at the venue, following on from a successful hosting of the 2003 European Athletics Indoor Cup.

The competition featured nineteen athletics events, nine for men and ten for women. The 400 metres race were held in a dual final format due to size constraints, with athletes' being assigned final positions through their finishing times.The international team standings were determined by the finishing positions of the athletes, with each competitor’s result contributing points toward their nation’s overall total.

The Russia women's national athletics team successfully defended the title they had won the previous year, achieving a dominant victory. Russian athletes won seven of the ten women’s events, and the team finished eighteen points ahead of runner-up Germany.

The men’s competition, however, was far more closely contested, with the championship being decided in the final Swedish medley relay event, with France just managing to maintain its lead and beat the Russian men by two points in the final rankings.

== Results summary ==
=== Men ===
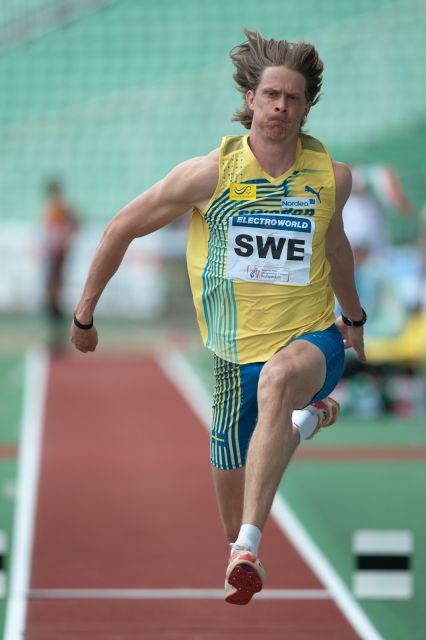
Triple jump winner Christian Olsson went on to win Olympic gold that year.

Event	Gold		Silver		Bronze	
60 metres	Jason Gardener (GBR)	6.51	Simone Collio (ITA)	6.63	Łukasz Chyła (POL)	6.65
400 metres	Dmitriy Forshev (RUS)	46.46	Brice Panel (FRA)	47.05	Robert Tobin (GBR)	47.26
800 metres	Bram Som (NED)	1:48.79	René Herms (GER)	1:49.14	Rickard Pell (SWE)	1:49.40
1500 metres	Mounir Yemmouni (FRA)	3:49.82	Matt Shone (GBR)	3:49.91	Zbigniew Graczyk (POL)	3:50.31
3000 metres	Gert-Jan Liefers (NED)	7:49.70	Ismaïl Sghyr (FRA)	7:51.28	Salvatore Vincenti (ITA)	7:51.89
60 metres hurdles	Andrea Giaconi (ITA)	7.72	Gregory Sedoc (NED)	7.80	Mohammed Sillah-Freckleton (GBR)	7.81
Swedish relay (800/600/400/200 m)	Russia (RUS); Dmitriy Bogdanov; Andrey Rudnitskiy; Aleksandr Usov; Oleg Sergeyev	4:12.26	Netherlands (NED); Arnoud Okken; Bram Som; Guus Hoogmoed; Patrick van Balkom	4:12.52	Germany (GER); Andreas Freimann; Ruwen Faller; Bastian Swillms; Tobias Unger	4:14.65
Pole vault	Björn Otto (GER)	5.70 m	Igor Pavlov (RUS)	5.65 m	Patrik Kristiansson (SWE)	5.55 m
Triple jump	Christian Olsson (SWE)	17.31 m	Viktor Gushchinskiy (RUS)	16.94 m	Fabrizio Donato (ITA)	16.65 m

=== Women ===
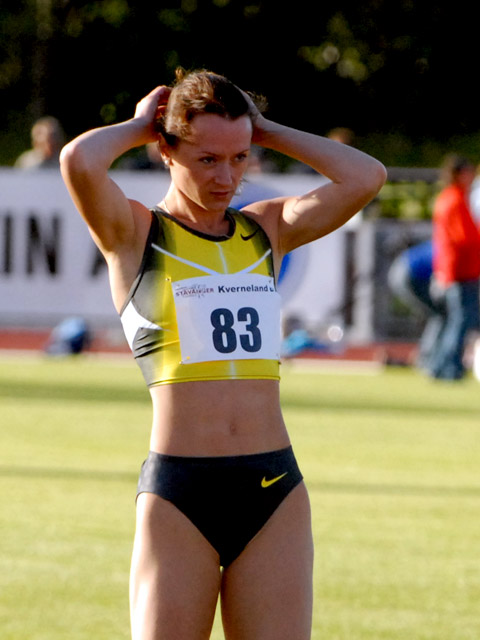
Yelena Slesarenko took the high jump silver medal.

Event	Gold		Silver		Bronze	
60 metres	Larisa Kruglova (RUS)	7.27	Gabi Rockmeier (GER)	7.29	Evi Nesoudi (GRE)	7.31
400 metres	Olesya Krasnomovets (RUS)	51.31	Claudia Marx (GER)	52.01	Antonina Yefremova (UKR)	52.41
800 metres	Olga Raspopova (RUS)	2:00.41	Jo Fenn (GBR)	2:00.54	Tetiana Petlyuk (UKR)	2:01.14
1500 metres	Iryna Lishchynska (UKR)	4:09.82	Yuliya Kosenkova (RUS)	4:10.24	Maria Martins (FRA)	4:12.87
3000 metres	Yelena Zadorozhnaya (RUS)	8:53.45	Lidia Chojecka (POL)	8:53.62	Sabrina Mockenhaupt (GER)	9:01.00
60 metres hurdles	Flora Redoumi (GRE)	7.97	Glory Alozie (ESP)	7.99	Juliane Sprenger (GER)	8.00
Swedish relay (800/600/400/200 m)	Russia (RUS); Irina Vashentseva; Natalya Khrushcheleva; Mariya Lisnichenko; Irina Khabarova	4:46.14	Germany (GER); Kathleen Friedrich; Maren Schott; Jana Neubert; Birgit Rockmeier	4:47.92	Great Britain (GBR); Becky Lyne; Jenny Meadows; Helen Karagounis; Joice Maduaka	4:52.18
High jump	Daniela Rath (GER)	2.00 m	Yelena Slesarenko (RUS)	1.96 m	Vita Styopina (UKR) Ruth Beitia (ESP)	1.93 m
Long jump	Irina Simagina (RUS)	6.72 m	Sophie Krauel (GER)	6.46 m	Concepción Montaner (ESP)	6.39 m
Shot put	Irina Khudoroshkina (RUS)	18.75 m	Krystyna Zabawska (POL)	18.50 m	Nadine Kleinert (GER)	18.38 m

== Medal table ==
Key

The host country is highlighted in lavender blue

Men
Rank	Nation	Points total	Gold	Silver	Bronze	Medal total
1	France	50	1	2	0	3
2	Russia	48	2	2	0	4
3	Germany	46	1	1	1	3
4	Italy	45	1	1	2	4
5	Netherlands	43	2	2	0	4
6	Great Britain	35	1	1	2	4
7	Poland	35	0	0	2	2
8	Sweden	29	1	0	2	3
Total			9	9	9	27

Women
Rank	Nation	Points total	Gold	Silver	Bronze	Medal total
1	Russia	82	7	2	0	9
2	Germany	64	1	4	3	8
3	Ukraine	46.5	1	0	3	4
4	Poland	41	0	2	0	2
5	Spain	39.5	0	1	2	3
6	Great Britain	35	0	1	1	2
7	Greece	33	1	0	1	2
8	France	28	0	0	1	1
Total			10	10	11	31
