= Dwain Chambers =

British track sprinter (born 1978)

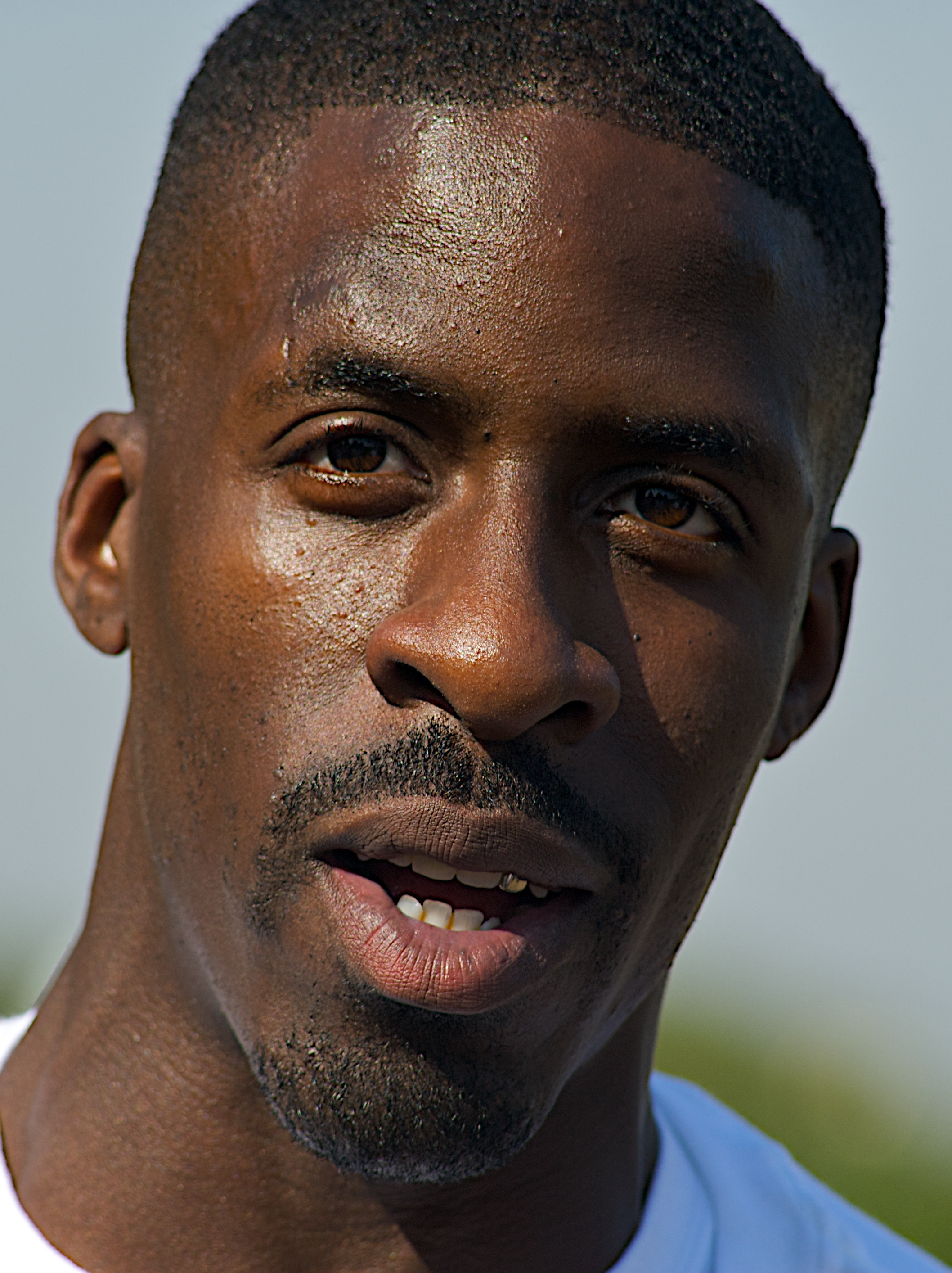
- Chambers in 2008

Personal information
- Nationality: British (English)
- Born: 5 April 1978 (age 48) London, England
- Height: 5 ft 11 in (180 cm)
- Weight: 183 lb (83 kg)

Sport
- Sport: Men's athletics
- Events: 100 metres, 60 metres
- Club: Belgrave Harriers

Achievements and titles
- Personal best: 9.97 s
Medal record
Representing Great Britain
World Championships
Silver medal – second place	1999 Seville	4 × 100 m relay
Bronze medal – third place	1999 Seville	100 m
World Indoor Championships
Gold medal – first place	2010 Doha	60 m
Silver medal – second place	2008 Valencia	60 m
Bronze medal – third place	2012 Istanbul	60 m
World Relays
Bronze medal – third place	2014 Nassau	4 × 100 m relay
Goodwill Games
Gold medal – first place	2001 Brisbane	4 × 100 m relay
Gold medal – first place	2001 Brisbane	100 m
European Championships
Gold medal – first place	2006 Gothenburg	4 × 100 m relay
Silver medal – second place	1998 Budapest	100 m
European Indoor Championships
Gold medal – first place	2009 Turin	60 m
Silver medal – second place	2011 Paris	60 m
European Junior Championships
Gold medal – first place	1995 Nyiregyhaza	100 m
Gold medal – first place	1995 Nyiregyhaza	4 × 100 m relay
Gold medal – first place	1997 Ljubljana	100 m
Gold medal – first place	1997 Ljubljana	4 × 100 m relay
Representing England
Commonwealth Games
Gold medal – first place	1998 Kuala Lumpur	4 × 100 m relay

Dwain Anthony Chambers (born 5 April 1978) is a British track sprinter. He has won international medals at World and European levels and is one of the fastest European sprinters in the history of athletics. His primary event is the 100 metres, with a best of 9.97 seconds, which ranks him equal 9th on the British all-time list. He is the former European record holder for the 60 metres and 4 × 100 metres relay events with 6.42 seconds and 37.73 s respectively.

Chambers ran a 100 m world junior record of 10.06 s in 1997 and became the youngest ever medalist in the event at the 1999 World Championships, taking the bronze. On his Olympic début at the 2000 Sydney Olympics he was the best European performer in fourth place. He broke the 10-second barrier twice at the 2001 World Championships. In 2003 he received a two-year athletics ban after testing positive for THG, a banned performance-enhancing drug and was stripped of the 100 m European title and record he achieved in 2002.

Chambers returned to competition in June 2006 and won gold with his teammates in the 4 × 100 m at the 2006 European Championships. He tried other sports, including a spell with the Hamburg Sea Devils of the NFL Europa league and a rugby league trial with Castleford. Sprinting success came over 60 m when he won silver at the 2008 World Indoor Championships, gold at the 2009 European Indoors, and became world champion at the 2010 World Indoor Championships.

Due to his doping ban, he was barred from the Olympics, Commonwealth Games, and much of the European racing circuit, from 2006 to 2012. The Court of Arbitration for Sport overturned his lifetime Olympic ban, deeming it non-compliant with the World Anti-Doping Code, and he competed in the 2012 London Olympics. He produced a ghost-written autobiography with writer Ken Scott, Race Against Me, in 2009.

Still competing at the age of 45, he set a new indoor M45 60 m world record and reached the semi-finals in the UK Athletics Indoor Championships. Outside of Athletics, he is an athletics coach and public speaker.

He is of Afro-Caribbean- Jamaican descent and has two sons with his partner Leonie Daley.

== Biography ==
=== Early life and career ===
Chambers was born in Islington, and raised in Finsbury Park, London. Running was a part of his family life: his older sister Christine won the senior 100 metres Finals at the English Schools Championships in 1986 and 1987 and competed in the European Athletics Junior Championships. As a schoolboy he was coached by Selwyn Philbert who devoted himself to the young sprinter. Chambers first athletic success came at the 1994 English Schools' Athletic Association Championships, where he won the boys' intermediate 100 m race with a time of 10.64 seconds. International medals followed at the 1995 European Junior Championships, at which he won the 100 m and the 4 × 100 metres relay. He defended these titles at the 1997 European Junior Championships, and set a then world junior record in the 100 m with a time of 10.06 s.

Chambers transitioned into the senior ranks soon after, taking the 100 m silver medal behind his British teammate Darren Campbell at the 1998 European Championships. He achieved a new personal best in September at the 1998 IAAF World Cup with a run of 10.03 s for third place and won a relay gold medal. At the 1998 Commonwealth Games he was a 100 m semi finalist and set a games record as part of the 4 × 100 m relay team. His ability attracted the attention of former sprinter and Commonwealth Games gold medallist Mike McFarlane, who became his coach. He came first in the 100 m in the 1999 European Cup, then at a meet in Nuremberg he became only the second European sprinter (after Linford Christie) to break the ten second barrier with a time of 9.99 s. Fellow British sprinter Jason Gardener scored a time of 9.98 s in Lausanne soon after, becoming the third Briton to break the barrier. In spite of this, Chambers remained some distance behind his North American counterparts in terms of times.

=== Seville World Championships to Sydney Olympics ===
In his first major outing on the world stage, Chambers attained a new personal best at the 1999 World Championships in Seville, registering a time of 9.97 s for third place in the 100 m final. This made the 21-year-old the youngest ever World Championships 100 m medallist. North Americans dominated the event as Maurice Greene and Bruny Surin took first and second place respectively, with record runs of 9.80 s and 9.84 s, respectively. The British sprint team Chambers, Gardener, Campbell and Marlon Devonish performed well in the 4 × 100 metres relay event as runners-up in a time of 37.73 s behind the US team led by Greene. World record holder Maurice Greene was hitting his peak, winning three gold medals in Seville. However, at 21 years old, Chambers had achieved more than Greene had at that age: Greene's best was 10.08 s in 1996 and he had never reached a major final.

With the 2000 Sydney Olympics approaching, Chambers studied the technique of other sprinters. In an interview with BBC journalist Tom Fordyce, Chambers commented on the stamina Greene and Surin had gained from running in the 200 metres event and Jason Gardener's improved acceleration through running the 60 metres event. He experimented with distances at the beginning of 2000, sprinting over 50, 60 and 200 m in various competitions. He set a personal best of 6.55 s in the 60 m event in Ghent in February. A hamstring injury caused him to miss six-weeks of training and when he returned his 100 m performances were lacklustre. He finished ninth at the Golden Gala in Rome with a slow time of 10.41 s and was seventh in a tame 10.30 s at the London Grand Prix, results that led him to consider quitting the season altogether. A late rejuvenation at the British Olympic trials guaranteed his selection as he snatched first place with 10.11 s (just one hundredth of a second ahead of Darren Campbell). Victory against in-form world record holder Maurice Greene in Gateshead raised Chambers' confidence and he stated his aim to take home a medal from the Games.

The 2000 Sydney Olympics saw Chambers come close to the podium. He easily qualified through the heat stages and achieved a season's best of 10.08 s in the 100 m final finishing fourth behind Greene, Ato Boldon and Obadele Thompson. Chambers was the best European 100 m performer, but after disqualification in the relay heats he left the games without a medal.

=== Edmonton World championships ===
He made his fastest opening to a season in 2001 by winning the 100 m for his club Belgrave Harriers at the European Clubs Cup with a meet record time of 10.12 s. At the Amateur Athletics Association (AAA) trials in Birmingham his run of 10.01 s was the fastest ever wind-legal time recorded in Britain by a British sprinter. Chambers ran with consistency in the summer of 2001: he won at the Seville Grand Prix in 10.01 s and finished third in ten seconds flat at the Athletissima meet. In the run up to the 2001 IAAF Edmonton World Championships Chambers compared his own performances to the British record holder: "I am very consistent in the 10.00s this year, and that bodes well for the Worlds. If you are running as fast as Linford Christie in his prime, it gives you a lot of confidence."

You have to have it upstairs to beat Maurice. His whole aura can have an effect on your mental focus. If you get caught up in his mind-games then you'll be crushed.

— Chambers on Maurice Greene
BBC Interview with Tom Fordyce

Chambers also competed over 200 m and a personal best run of 20.31 s earned him selection in both sprints for the World Championships. In an interview with Tom Fordyce, Chambers stated that Maurice Greene's strong presence and mind games undermined the competition both physically and mentally. "You have to get out in front of him and hold on for dear life" he said of the world record holder.

Chambers broke the ten second barrier twice in the 2001 World Championships with a personal best of 9.97 s in the quarter-finals and a run of 9.99 s in the final. This was not enough for a medal in a strong race which featured five sprinters running under ten seconds and saw Greene defend his title. Chambers was later upgraded to fourth place after silver medallist Tim Montgomery tested positive for banned substances. A hamstring injury in the final ruled him out of the 200 m event. Chambers ended his season at the 2001 Goodwill Games in Brisbane, and finished in first place in the absence of an injured Greene, who commentated on his European rival's victory.

=== 2002 European champion ===
Chambers' coach Mike McFarlane struggled with the workload of full-time training. Frustrated by the distance between himself and the top sprinters, Chambers decided to relocate to California to work with Ukrainian coach Remi Korchemny and nutritionist Victor Conte. After parting ways with American sprinter Tim Montgomery, Conte looked to Chambers to fill the athlete's berth. In the run up to the year's major events, Chambers was in fine form and recorded a 200 m personal best of 20.27 s in Athens on 10 June 2002. (Note: All results, times, personal bests, records, medals or other achievements flagged with an "x" label were nullified from the record by the IAAF as they were achieved while Chambers was using banned substances.) Montgomery, impressed by Chambers' training regime, tipped the Briton to win the gold at the forthcoming 2002 Commonwealth Games in Manchester, England.

I'm not taking anything away from Dwain. He was better prepared than me and fully deserved the victory. He's getting better and better. I can't be mad with myself – he ran so well.

— Maurice Greene after losing to Chambers in Oslo
From BBC Sport

He won the 100 m at the Commonwealth Games trials in a season's best of 10.03 s, then equalled Linford Christie's record of 10.04 s at European Cup, where he led the British team to victory as team captain. Victories over Maurice Greene followed at Oslo's IAAF Golden League meeting and in Sheffield with a wind-assisted 9.95 s. He was the favourite for the 2002 Commonwealth Games, but Chambers faced stiff competition from British newcomer Mark Lewis-Francis who was finishing fractions of a second behind him. Chambers won all his preliminary races and reached the final, along with Lewis-Francis and Jason Gardener, but he suffered a cramp mid-race and ended up in last place. The English sprinters had the three slowest times in the final, with Lewis-Francis also beset by injury.

After Commonwealth disappointment on home turf, Chambers won gold medals in the 100 m and 4 × 100 m relay at the 2002 European Championships in Munich, setting a championship record of 9.96 s. Chambers recorded a time of 9.94 s at the Weltklasse Zürich meeting, again beating world record holder Greene. He finished the season by equalling Linford Christie's European record at the 2002 IAAF Grand Prix Final. His run of 9.87 s with a maximum allowable wind of +2.0 m/s left him second to Tim Montgomery, who set a world record of 9.78 s. Chambers received the 2002 European Athlete of the Year trophy for his achievements on the track that year.

=== 2003 World championships ===
Chambers began the 2003 season with a grandiose statement – namely that he would lower the 100 m record to 9.65 s. After recovering from a minor injury he suffered in January, Despite claims he could also beat the 60 m indoor record, his form was poor and he failed to pass the heats at the 2003 British Grand Prix, finishing fourth in a time of 6.68 s. He was beaten by Mark Lewis-Francis by a hundredth of a second at the trials for the IAAF World Indoor Championships, narrowly missing out on selection with a time of 6.59 s.

Chambers announced that he was to part with trainer Mike McFarlane in favour of a permanent relationship with Ukrainian coach Remi Korchemny. The sprinter started the 100 m season modestly, finishing third and fourth in Modesto and Eugene, respectively. Chambers beat Montgomery in Glasgow in June, running a stadium record of 10.15 s into a headwind, and qualified for the World Championships by winning the AAA trials.

His season's best came under unusual circumstances at the British Grand Prix – due to a system malfunction he was initially timed by hand at dead on ten seconds, which was amended to 9.96 s after video evidence was consulted. He could not match that form at the World 100 m final: Kim Collins, Darrel Brown, Darren Campbell, and Chambers all finished within a split second of each other and Chambers was adjudged to have finished fourth. Chambers squandered his anchoring lead in the 4 × 100 m relay, allowing Joshua J. Johnson of the United States team to beat him to the finish line. In spite of his close fourth and a relay silver medal, there was a sense of disappointment in the press that Chambers' record breaking claims and gold medals had not materialised.

=== Doping ban ===
A sample for an out-of-competition drugs test that Chambers had provided in Germany on 1 August 2003 was re-examined in October and subsequently tested positive for banned substances. The United States Anti-Doping Agency (USADA) were investigating the Bay Area Laboratory Co-operative (BALCO); the workplace of both Chambers' coach Remi Korchemny, and nutritionist Victor Conte. Both men faced charges of distributing illegal drugs to athletes in the United States. The BALCO Scandal uncovered drug use in a wide range of sportsmen and women, including sprinters Marion Jones and Tim Montgomery.

Chambers claimed that his new coach had introduced him to Conte as a way of providing him with specialised 'nutritional supplements' – which he took by putting a few drops of liquid under his tongue. Conte had helped develop a type of anabolic steroid called THG, or tetrahydrogestrinone, at BALCO. After Chambers discovered that he had tested positive for drugs he sent his lawyer to meet Conte and make inquires about the supplement he had been ingesting. Conte assured him that all the substances were IAAF compliant.

After further investigation, it was revealed on 22 October 2003 that Chambers had tested positive for the banned steroid THG. Analysis of his backup sample also tested positive and the outcome was confirmed on 7 November 2003, making Chambers the first person to test positive for the new drug. Chambers was suspended the same day with an independent UK Athletics tribunal pending. The disciplinary hearing on 24 February 2004 resulted in a two-year ban from athletics, backdated to begin on 7 November 2003. He was also banned for life from the Olympics, and stripped of the medals he had won since mid-2002, after admitting that he had taken THG from that date. Chambers' 2002 relay gold medal performance was erased, costing teammates Darren Campbell, Marlon Devonish and Christian Malcolm their medals in the process. Chambers was also ordered by the IAAF to pay back his earnings from the period of his athletics career that was affected by his drug abuse.

Conte claimed that rival coach Trevor Graham had revealed the drug to US testers, acting "purely out of competitive jealousy" as Chambers was challenging Graham's trainees; Montgomery and Greene. Chambers denied that he had any knowledge that the substance he was taking was banned and claimed he was deceived by Conte over its true use. However, he contradicted his statement in a later interview, saying that he had major suspicions that he was using banned substances but was too naïve and lacking in self-respect to act otherwise. By Chambers' own admission in 2008, in a letter by his supplier Conte to British anti-doping chief John Scott, THG was not the only substance he had used during his career. In his confession he admitted to the use of epitestosterone cream, EPO, HGH, insulin lispro, modafinil and liothyronine.

Banned from competition, Chambers sought alternative commercial outlets for his athletic prowess. He had an unsuccessful American football try-out with the San Francisco 49ers, hoping to emulate Renaldo Nehemiah. He drifted on to the celebrity circuit, appearing on British reality television series Hell's Kitchen in May 2004. However, Chambers had little interest in the show and soon chose to leave. He appeared in neither sporting events nor television programmes for 18 months.

=== Return to athletics ===
Chambers began training in Jamaica in late 2005 in preparation for the athletics season. He faced new challengers in the 100 m as Maurice Greene was no longer a dominant force and Jamaican Asafa Powell was the new world record holder. Chambers began working with Glen Mills, coach of Caribbean sprinters Kim Collins and Usain Bolt. The drug suspension had expired in November but he needed to pass four mandatory drugs tests in order to gain clearance to compete with the IAAF. His comeback was further delayed as he gave an interview with the BBC revealing he began using drugs at the beginning of 2002, not since August 2003, as he had claimed to the IAAF. After further disclosure (that took away his European 100 m gold medal and invalidated his European record of 9.87 s), Chambers was cleared to compete on 10 June 2006, although his return was dependent on an agreement to repay prize money he won while using banned substances. He returned to competition on 11 June 2006 at the British Grand Prix and took third in 10.07 s, behind Asafa Powell who equalled his own world record. Chambers stated that his training regime with Bolt had helped him make a strong opening performance despite a long absence from competition. The result placed Chambers at the top of the British rankings and was the second fastest time by a European sprinter in 2006.

Ironically, with the exception of the 9.87 s he clocked to equal Linford Christie's British record in Paris in 2002, Chambers was a consistently quicker athlete before he moved to San Francisco that year and became entangled in the drugs net spun by Victor Conte, and the Bay Area Lab Co-operative.

— Simon Turnbull on Chambers' drug use
from The Independent

Chambers lamented the effects of his drug use and noted the irony that the drugs did not do much to improve the consistency of his performances. On his return to international competition his times were significantly worse than he achieved prior to drug use: in the 100 m final at the 2006 European Championships, Chambers ran a sub-par 10.24 s and finished in fifth place. He was part of the gold medal-winning British 4 × 100 m team, but Darren Campbell, who was angry about losing his 2002 and 2003 relay medals due to Chambers' ban, refused to join the team in a celebratory lap. After the competition, Chambers again expressed an interest in switching to American football, and completed a week-long NFL Europa training camp in Cologne that November.

=== American Football ===
Chambers signed for BAFA National Leagues side Farnham Knights in 2005, After attending a series of NFL Europe training camps, he gained a contract with German NFL Europa side Hamburg Sea Devils in March 2007. Following news that Chambers was receiving new, legal nutritional supplements from Victor Conte, the Hamburg Sea Devils confirmed that Chambers would undergo a vigorous drug testing regime.

When asked whether a clean athlete was likely to beat one using drugs in an Olympic final: "It's possible, but the person that's taken drugs has to be having a real bad day. That's what I believe".

— BBC interview with Matthew Pinsent

Chambers reflected on drug use in athletics in an interview with Olympic gold medallist Sir Matthew Pinsent for the BBC's Inside Sport programme. Chambers claimed there would always be athletes using performance-enhancing drugs because drug testers did not keep pace with advances in science and that athletes who took drugs had an immense advantage over those who remained clean. Chambers was roundly condemned for his comments in the interview by both the press and his former colleagues in the athletics world, including Sir Steve Redgrave, Mo Farah, and Sebastian Coe.

Chambers' American football career was brought to a standstill when a stress fracture injury on his right foot ruled him out for the season. The situation worsened further when the NFL closed the European league on 29 June 2007 leaving Chambers jobless. He returned as a TV personality on reality television show Cirque de Celebrité in October but was unpopular with the public and subsequently voted off.

=== Athletics again and rugby league ===
Following the collapse of the NFL Europa franchise, Chambers made a second return to athletics in early 2008. Competing in the 60 m indoor final at the Birmingham Games in February 2008, he finished with a time of 6.60 s, setting a new meeting record. UK Athletics chief executive Niels de Vos initially banned Chambers from competing in the trials for the 2008 IAAF World Indoor Championships but, after the IAAF overruled the decision, Chambers won the event and selection. UK Athletics stated that committee was "unanimous in its desire not to select Dwain" but were forced to by the selection criteria, saying they would have preferred to send younger athletes eligible for the Olympics.

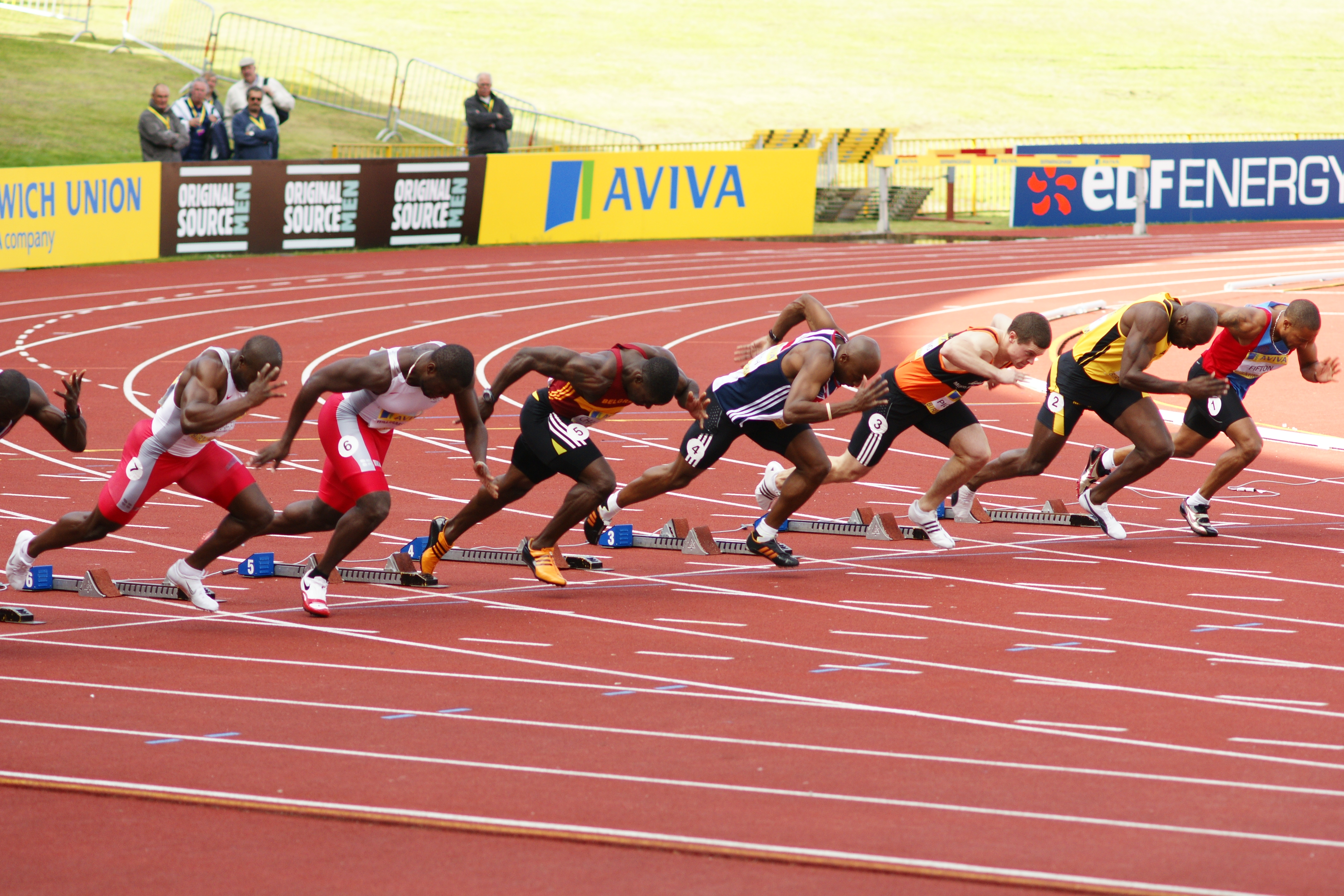
Chambers racing against British competition in 2008.

At the World Indoor Championships 60 metres final, Chambers won a silver medal and recorded a new personal best of 6.54 s to take second behind Olusoji Fasuba. The performance did not sway opinion: Chambers continued to encounter extensive criticism within athletics. Promoters did not invite him to key athletics events, Eddie Kulukundis – who had supported Chambers earlier in his career – refused to sponsor the sprinter, and the British Olympic Association (BOA), prevented him from competing in the 2008 Summer Olympics in Beijing. To return to the track Chambers had to rely on the money he received from his partner, Leonie Daley, a civil servant whom he met at the Miss Jamaica UK competition. The couple now had a child, a boy named Skye who was born in September 2005. He amassed a selection of cuttings about his fall from grace and the BALCO Scandal in order to show his son the risks of drug abuse.

Chambers tried to fashion himself as a living example of the dangers of drugs, sporting a T-shirt in Valencia with an anti-drugs slogan of "Just Say No!". He also expressed regret about previous comments suggesting that drug use was necessary to reach the upper echelons of athletics and set about presenting himself as a changed, clean athlete – devoid of the bravado that had marked his earlier career. Chambers' reinvention was met with a mixed reaction and the acceptance of a proven drug user on the track was not palatable to some. Dame Kelly Holmes, and parts of the British press called for Chambers to retire from the Great Britain athletics team.

Chambers' return to athletics took an unusual turn when he confirmed in March 2008 that he had joined English rugby league team Castleford Tigers on trial; a move which surprised and angered in equal measure given the fact he had never played the sport before. The Rugby Football League did not object to the move, in spite of his drug-damaged reputation, but stated much improvement was needed prior to any appearance for Castleford in the Super League competition. At a rugby press conference, Chambers expressed a desire to compete in the Beijing Olympics, casting doubt on his dedication to his new career. Chambers officially registered as a player with the Rugby Football League, and Martin Offiah declared that he was prepared to mentor Chambers. He completed training with the Castleford Tigers first-team squad and made his début in a reserve game against York City Knights, but Castleford announced that they would not be offering him a contract.

=== High Court challenge ===
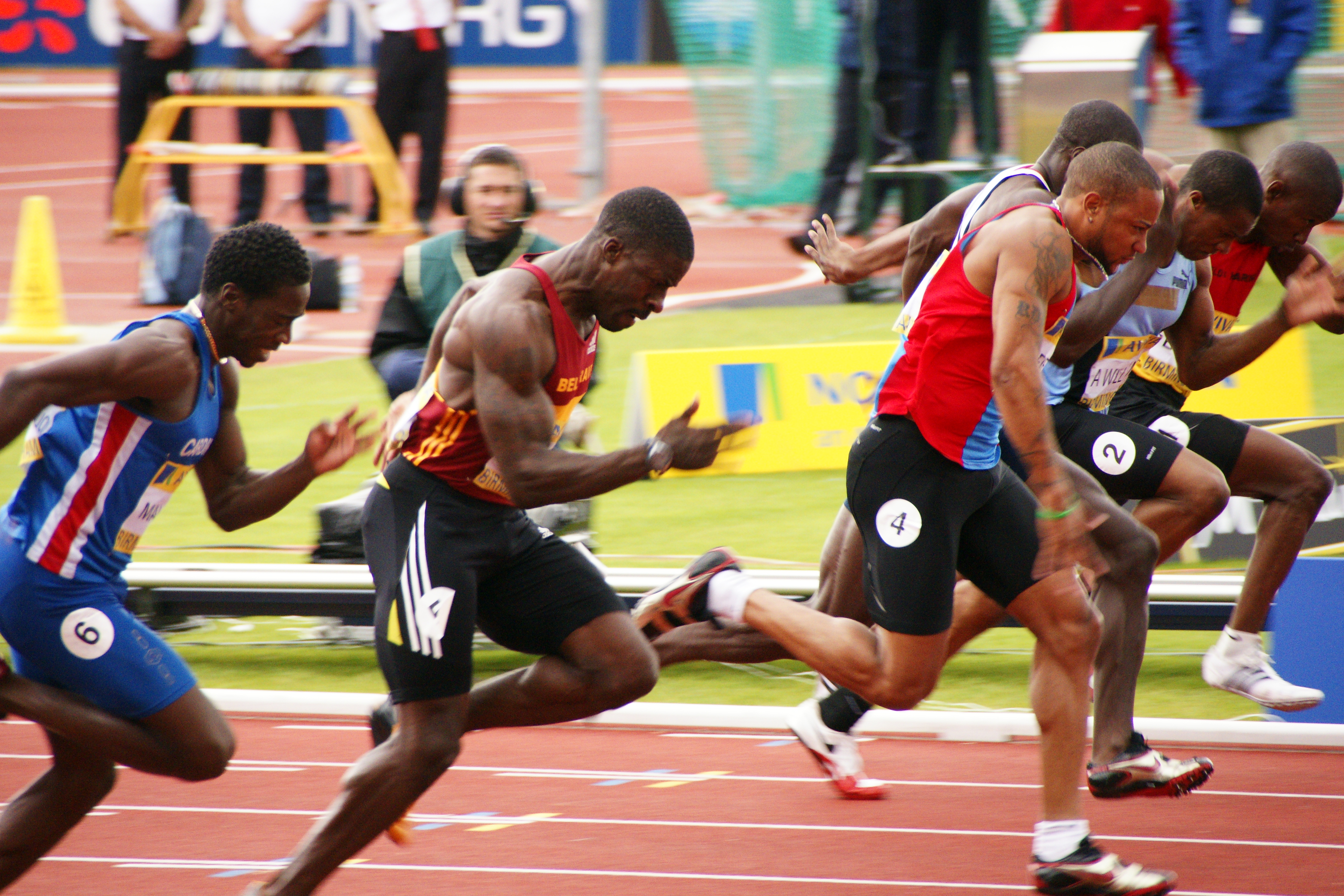
Chambers (second from left), competing in the 2008 Olympic Trials, Birmingham

In May 2008 Chambers announced that he was challenging his Olympic ban at the High Court of Justice. Chambers returned to sprinting in June and, in his first 100 m race since August 2006, he won the Papaflessia meet with a time of 10.26 s. He achieved the "A" Standard for the 2008 Beijing Olympics in June and won the British Olympic trials in ten seconds flat in July. Public opinion on an Olympic appearance remained split.

His performance at the Olympic trials was in vain as Mr. Justice Mackay upheld the BOA ban in the High Court of Justice and stated that a right to work was not sufficient reason to remove it. The BOA chairman, Lord Moynihan, was satisfied with the outcome, stating that those abusing drugs did not deserve to represent Great Britain at the Olympics. However, he lamented that a sprinter of Chambers' calibre had in effect excluded himself from the competition.

It is a matter of regret that Dwain Chambers, an athlete with such undoubted talent…should by his own actions put himself out of the running to shine on the Olympic stage in Beijing.

— Lord Moynihan, chairman of the BOA, on Chambers' Olympic ban

The effort of the High Court challenge and the Olympic ban took its toll on Chambers, but he had no intention to retire and set an appearance in the 2012 London Olympics as his main goal, aiming to prove he could perform without the use of drugs. Lord Moynihan objected to this, saying it would sully the reputation of both the Great Britain athletics team and the London Olympics. In late 2008 Chambers signed a book deal, covering his athletics career and drug usage, and stated his desire to become a sprint coach when his track career was finished. He had his second child, a boy named Rocco, that November.

Charles van Commenee's appointment as head coach of UK Athletics brought a change of approach towards Chambers as both the new coach and Niels De Vos welcomed him back to compete internationally. The pair judged that he had served his sentence – van Commenee was especially complimentary, stating: "He is a likeable guy and a damned fine athlete". That month Chambers appeared at a "Tackling Doping in Sport" conference and told of the damage drugs had caused to his career, health, and finances. The Olympic ban remained in place, however, and London 2012 chairman Sebastian Coe said: "I am clear cut on the Chambers case – I don't think there is room for drugs cheats in sport".

=== Race Against Me ===
Chambers ceased legal action to overturn his Olympic ban and instead aimed to finish his career on a high. He intensively studied the technique of Usain Bolt to improve his own times, seeing Bolt as the new generation's Maurice Greene. Though he was still banned from Euromeetings-organised events, he set a new personal best of 6.52 s in the 60 m at the Birmingham Indoor Grand Prix, then became the UK Indoor Champion, equalling Mike Rodgers' world leading time of 6.51 s. At the 2009 European Indoor Championships he broke Ronald Pognon's European 60 m record with a 6.42 s run in the semi-finals, then won the gold medal with a time of 6.46 s in the final. British head coach van Commenee stated that Chambers had undergone vigorous testing and that his performance sent "a message that you can win and break European records in the proper way."

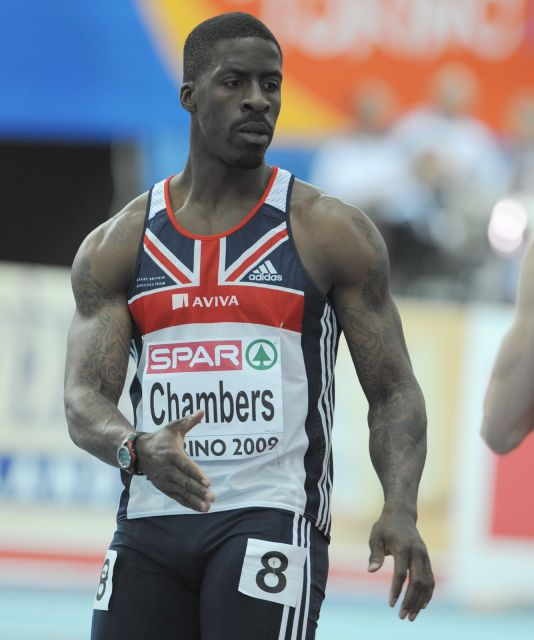
Chambers competing in the 2009 European Team Championships

The record-breaking performance brought him an invite from the Berlin IAAF Golden League meet, although organising group Euromeetings condemned the move. Revelations in Chambers' autobiography Race Against Me brought further controversy as the book had in-depth accounts of his past drug abuse and claimed drug use remained rife in athletics, estimating that half the American Olympic athletes in Beijing had used illegal substances. Chambers signed a statement with UK Sport, verifying that he believed the information to be true, which brought a close to the organisation's inquiries into his drug use. An IAAF investigation concluded that the book demanded no further action on their part. Olympic gold medallist and anti-drugs campaigner Ed Moses gave his support, saying that Chambers admissions provided a useful insight, but that athletes and administrators remained in denial about the high levels of doping in athletics.

Invites to Golden League meets never materialised, but he continued to run at smaller events. He ran a European leading time of 10.06 seconds at Papaflessia in Greece, and won the 100 m and 200 m races at the 2009 European Team Championships. He was the fastest entrant at the national championships but 2008 runner-up Simeon Williamson won the final by some distance. The result took Chambers by surprise and he said that limited opportunities to race had made him complacent. He later withdrew from the 200 m race citing exhaustion.

At the World Championships Chambers finished sixth in 100 m final with a season's best of 10.00 seconds. He was the only sprinter from outside the Americas in the final and was some distance behind Bolt who ran a world record of 9.58 seconds. However, he was pleased with his performance and said he was happy just to be involved in the fastest 100 m race ever. He pulled out of the 200 m with a calf injury and called an end to his season.

=== World indoor champion ===
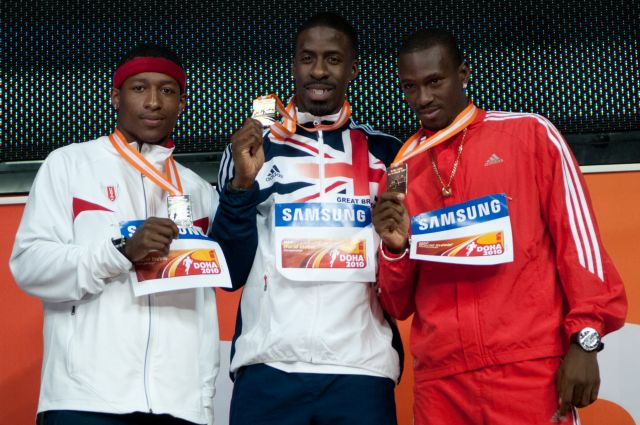
Chambers with his world 60 m gold medal

The following year, he began by focusing on the 2010 IAAF World Indoor Championships, and he won the 60 m at the UK trials in 6.50 seconds (a time only he had bettered in the previous two seasons). His closest competitor, Ivory Williams, received a ban for marijuana usage, leaving Chambers as a strong favourite. He was the fastest in all rounds of World 60 m competition, and surged ahead of Mike Rodgers in the final to win his first world title with a time of 6.48 seconds. Banned from the 2010 Commonwealth Games, he set his sights on making the team for the 2010 European Athletics Championships.

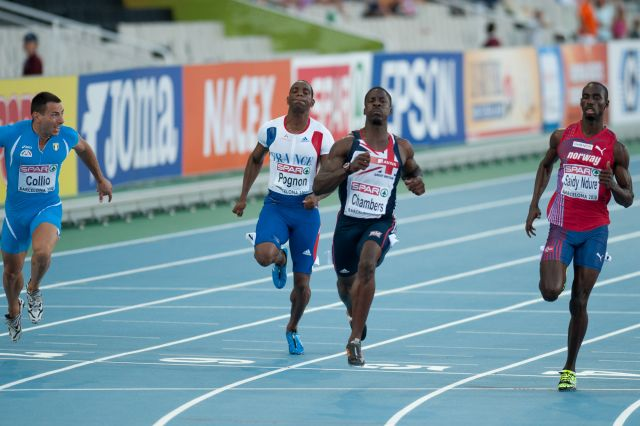
Chambers (shown in the semi-final) left the European Championships without a medal

At the start of the outdoor season he had wins in Maringá in Brazil and at the Cezmi Or Memorial. He beat Christophe Lemaitre to win the 100 m at the 2010 European Team Championships, helping Great Britain to second place in the tournament and recording 9.99 seconds – the first sub-10 time by a European athlete in almost four years. Lemaitre and Chambers were seen as the only gold medal contenders for the 100 m final at the European Athletics Championships, but the event defied expectations in terms of times and placings. The Frenchman won in 10.11 seconds into a headwind while a tight finish between the four following athletes (all 10.18) saw Chambers finish fifth.

=== 2011–2012: World and Olympic semi-finalist ===
The start of his 2011 season saw him take a fourth consecutive national title over 60 m with a European-leading time. At the 2011 European Athletics Indoor Championships the following month he was beaten to the line by Obikwelu, although he was pleased with the silver medal as he had changed his training to focus towards the 100 m for that season. Four straight wins on the Brazilian Athletics Tour came at the beginning of his outdoor season in May, including a season's best of 10.01 seconds, and he took his fifth national title at the British trials. At the 2011 World Championships he reached the 100 m semi-finals but fell foul of the IAAF's new false start rule: he twitched in his blocks and was immediately disqualified.

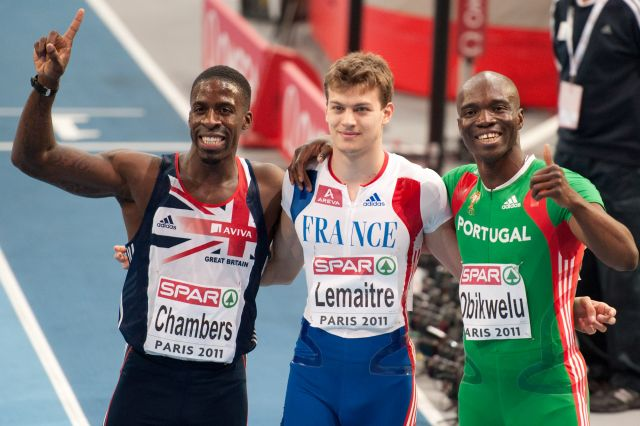
Chambers (left) with the 2011 European 60 m medalists Lemaitre and Obikwelu

He won his fifth national title in the 60 m in 2012 with a season's best of 6.58 m. A third consecutive podium finish came at the 2012 IAAF World Indoor Championships, where he pipped Trell Kimmons to the bronze medal. Chambers was given the chance to return to the Olympic stage after the Court of Arbitration for Sport (CAS) decided in favour of the World Anti-Doping Agency over the validity of British Olympic Association's (BOA) Olympic ban by-law. CAS agreed that the law was non-compliant with the World Anti-Doping Code, to which the BOA was signatory due to its connection with the International Olympic Committee. Chambers ran a 150 m-straight best of 15.27 seconds at the Great City Games in May then won the 100 m Olympic trial race, holding off emerging teenager Adam Gemili. His absence from the major track circuit came to an end with a run at the Diamond League London Grand Prix, although he did not achieve the Olympic "A" standard time there.

Chambers was named in the British squad for the 2012 London Olympics after the selectors took into account his trials win and his times from the previous year. Given the abrupt turnaround in his fortunes, he said: "For me representing my country in an Olympics is a privilege that should never be taken for granted. To be given the opportunity to do so in my home town has been a dream that at times has seemed very distant and is now a reality." He returned to the British relay team at the 2012 European Athletics Championships after a six-year absence but a botched baton change saw the team disqualified. At the Olympics he won his 100 metres heat in a season's best of 10.02 seconds, with a legal 2.0 m/s following wind, in his first Olympic race in twelve years. He was drawn in the same semi-final as Usain Bolt but Chambers' run of 10.05 seconds for fourth meant he did not make the final. His Olympics came to an end in the 4 × 100 metres relay heats as the British team made an illegal baton exchange.

=== Later career ===
Chambers began his 2013 season with a 60 m win in Glasgow with a run of 6.58 seconds. A back injury affected his preparations for the 2013 European Indoor Championships, where he was eliminated in the heats. Outdoors, he won his fourth consecutive British Championship title, running 10.04. A month later at the World Championships in Moscow, he ran 10.14 in his heat to reach the semi-finals, where he was eliminated running 10.15. He anchored the British men's 4 × 100 m relay team and initially appeared to finish third, though the team was disqualified due to an invalid baton change between Harry Aikines-Aryeetey and James Ellington. He ended the year with second-place finishes at the Rieti Challenge and Great North City Games.

Chambers final year of international competition came in 2014. He finished second in the 60 m at the British Indoor Championships, before going on to finish sixth in the 60 m final at the World Indoor Championships in a time of 6.52 s. This was the fastest time he had run the 60 m in since 2010. In his first three 100 m races of the outdoor season he failed to break 10.20, before hitting form during the British Championships. Going into the event, he was only ranked 10th in the UK, but he won the 100 m final, defeating Chijindu Ujah, who had broken 10 seconds three weeks earlier. Chambers' victory guaranteed him selection for the European Championships as his winning time was 10.12 secs, inside the European qualifying mark of 10.20. This was his fifth consecutive win at the British Championships. Chambers won his final medal in international competition at the 2014 IAAF World Relays in May, anchoring a team of Kilty, Harry Aikines-Aryeetey and James Ellington to a bronze. He won a fifth straight national title at the 2014 British Athletics Championships. Initially selected for the relay at the 2014 Commonwealth Games, he pulled out to focus on what would be his final international appearance at the 2014 European Championships in August. Chambers missed out on a final individual medal by 0.02 seconds, finishing fourth in the 100 m final in 10.24, while his teammates Dasaolu and Aikines-Aryeetey reached the podium.

Chambers attended just two meets in 2015. He had a more active 2016, winning his heat and semi-final in the 60 m at the British Indoor Championships but only managed seventh in the final. At the outdoor national championships in June, he made the final of the 100 m in which he ran a heavily wind assisted (+3.0 m/s) 10.11, which once again saw him finish seventh. In 2017, Chambers came third at the national indoor championships in 6.62 but was not selected for the 2017 European Indoor Championships. He could only reach the national semi-finals outdoors in July in the 100 m, and announced his retirement the following month.

In December 2018, at the age of 40 Chambers returned at a low-key meet in London. He then entered the national indoor championships in February 2019. He progressed from his heat, but was disqualified after a false start in the semi-final. In February 2020, Chambers once again returned to the British Indoor Championships. He finished last in his semi-final after coming through the heats.

Chambers entered the 100 m at the British Championships in 2021 and 2022 but failed to progress from the heats on both occasions. After skipping 2023, he set a new world record for the M45 Indoor 60 m with a time of 6.81 s at an open meet in Lee Valley in 2024. He went on to compete at the UK Indoor Championships in February 2024, reaching the semi-finals. He ran at two events in 2025, finishing the 60 metres in under seven seconds in both.

=== Outside Athletics ===
As well as competitive athletics, Chambers founded Chambers for Sport in 2009, offering group and 1-2-1 sprint coaching at the Lee Valley Athletics Centre in London. He founded the Dwain Chambers Performance Academy, which aims to provide all round coaching for the next generation of sporting stars and is open for young athletes between 9 and 21.

He is also a public speaker and gave his first TedX in October 2023.

== Statistics ==
Chambers' performances at tournaments in the 100 metres event make him one of the fastest European sprinters in the history of recorded athletics. His personal best of 9.97 s set at the 1999 Seville World Championships places him, as of 2025, in the top 20 fastest Europeans in the 100 m Chambers' annulled 9.87 s finish at the Paris Grand Prix in 2002 would have made him the joint fastest British 100 m sprinter with Christie and the joint second fastest European in the event.

Amongst his British contemporaries Chambers ranks top with two 9.97 s finishes; the first in 1999 in Seville, Spain and the second in 2001 in Edmonton, Canada. Compatriot Mark Lewis-Francis also scored a personal best of 9.97 s at the Edmonton World Championships. Great Britain teammate Jason Gardener's personal best of 9.98 s falls just short of Chambers'. None of his British contemporaries broke the ten second barrier on more than one occasion; Chambers has done so five times.

Chambers is the only athlete ever to run sub-10s 100 m in three consecutive decades (1990s, 2000s and 2010s) and, as of 2025, is the ninth-fastest Briton of all time over 100 m.

His personal best of 6.42 in the 60 metres set in 2009 was a European record for over a decade, with Marcell Jacobs beating that by one hundredth of a second in 2022. As of 2025, it remains the second fastest mark by a European, and within the top ten fastest globally.

=== Personal bests ===
Event	Time	Venue	Date
50 metres	5.69 seconds	Liévin, France	13 February 2000
60 metres	6.42 seconds	Turin, Italy	7 March 2009
100 metres	9.97 seconds (+0.2 m/s wind)	Seville, Spain	22 August 1999
200 metres	20.31 seconds (−0.6 m/s wind)	London, England	22 July 2001

- Excludes times nullified due to Chambers' positive drugs tests and subsequent ban – All information taken from IAAF profile.

=== International competition record ===
Year	Competition	Venue	Position	Event	Notes
Representing Great Britain and England
1995	European Junior Championships	Nyíregyháza, Hungary	1st	100 m	10.41
1995	European Junior Championships	Nyíregyháza, Hungary	1st	4 × 100 m relay	39.43
1996	World Junior Championships	Sydney, Australia	5th	100 m	10.47 (wind: +1.0 m/s)
1996	World Junior Championships	Sydney, Australia	7th	4 × 100 m relay	40.32
1997	European Junior Championships	Ljubljana, Slovenia	1st	100 m	10.06 WJR
1997	European Junior Championships	Ljubljana, Slovenia	1st	4 × 100 m relay	39.62
1998	European Indoor Championships	Valencia, Spain	5th (semis)	60 m	6.66
1998	European Championships	Budapest, Hungary	2nd	100 m	10.10
1998	European Championships	Budapest, Hungary	DNF	4 × 100 m relay	—
1998	IAAF World Cup	Johannesburg, South Africa	3rd	100 m	10.03
1998	IAAF World Cup	Johannesburg, South Africa	1st	4 × 100 m relay	38.09
1998	Commonwealth Games	Kuala Lumpur, Malaysia	5th (semis)	100 m	10.18
1998	Commonwealth Games	Kuala Lumpur, Malaysia	1st	4 × 100 m relay	38.20
1999	European Cup	Paris, France	1st	100 m	10.21
1999	World Championships	Seville, Spain	3rd	100 m	9.97 PB
1999	World Championships	Seville, Spain	2nd	4 × 100 m relay	37.73 AR
2000	Olympic Games	Sydney, Australia	4th	100 m	10.08
2000	Olympic Games	Sydney, Australia	DQ	4 × 100 m relay	—
2001	World Championships	Edmonton, Canada	4th†	100 m	9.99
2001	World Championships	Edmonton, Canada	5th (q-finals)	200 m	20.60
2001	World Championships	Edmonton, Canada	DNF	4 × 100 m relay	—
2001	Goodwill Games	Brisbane, Australia	1st	100 m	10.11
2002	Commonwealth Games	Manchester, England	8th	100 m	11.19
2002	European Championships	Munich, Germany	1st (DQ)	100 m	
2002	European Championships	Munich, Germany	1st (DQ)	4 × 100 m relay	
2006	European Cup	Málaga, Spain	2nd	100 m	10.19
2006	European Championships	Gothenburg, Sweden	7th	100 m	10.24
2006	European Championships	Gothenburg, Sweden	1st	4 × 100 m relay	38.91
2006	IAAF World Cup	Johannesburg, South Africa	2nd	4 × 100 m relay	38.45
2008	World Indoor Championships	Valencia, Spain	2nd	60 m	6.54
2009	European Indoor Championships	Torino, Italy	1st	60 m	6.46
2009	European Team Championships	Leiria, Portugal	1st	100 m	10.07
2009	European Team Championships	Leiria, Portugal	1st	200 m	20.55
2009	World Championships	Berlin, Germany	6th	100 m	10.00
2010	IAAF World Indoor Championships	Doha, Qatar	1st	60 m	6.48
2010	European Team Championships	Bergen, Norway	1st	100 m	9.99
2010	European Championships	Barcelona, Spain	5th	100 m	10.18
2011	European Indoor Championships	Paris, France	2nd	60 m	6.54
2011	World Championships	Daegu, South Korea	DQ (semis)	100 m	—
2012	World Indoor Championships	Istanbul, Turkey	3rd	60 m	6.60
2012	European Championships	Helsinki, Finland	DQ	4 × 100 m relay	—
2012	Olympic Games	London	4th (semis)	100 m	10.05
2012	Olympic Games	London	DQ	4 × 100 m relay	—
2013	European Indoor Championships	Gothenburg, Sweden	5th (heats)	60 m	6.78
2013	World Championships	Moscow, Russia	6th (semis)	100 m	10.15
2013	World Championships	Moscow, Russia	DQ	4 × 100 m relay	—
2014	World Indoor Championships	Sopot, Poland	6th	60 m	6.53
2014	European Championships	Zürich, Switzerland	4th	100 m	10.24
2014	World Relays	Nassau, Bahamas	3rd	4 × 100 m relay	38.19

- †Amended from fifth after Tim Montgomery tested positive for banned substances
- Excludes results nullified due to Chambers' positive drugs tests and subsequent ban.

== See also ==
- James Dasaolu
- List of doping cases in athletics

== Notes ==
Records
Preceded by Ronald Pognon	Men's 60 m European Indoor Record Holder; 7 March 2009 – Present	Succeeded by Incumbent
Awards
Preceded by André Bucher	Men's European Athlete of the Year; 2002	Succeeded by Christian Olsson
Records
Preceded by Stanley Floyd	Men's 100 m world junior record holder 24 May 1980 – 24 August 2003	Succeeded by Darrel Brown
