= Roberto Coltri =

Italian long jumper (born 1969)

Personal information
- Nationality: Italian
- Born: 28 June 1969 (age 57) Verona

Sport
- Country: Italy
- Sport: Athletics
- Event: Long jump

Achievements and titles
- Personal best: Long jump: 8.11 m (1995)
Medal record
European Cup
Bronze medal – third place	1999 Paris	Long jump

Roberto Coltri (born 28 June 1969) is an Italian male retired long jumper, who participated at the 1995 World Championships in Athletics.

== Biography ==
He finished 3rd in 1999 European Cup (Super League) and also won two times the national championships at senior level.

== Achievements ==
Year	Competition	Venue	Position	Event	Performance	Notes
1995	World Championships	(Sweden) Gothenburg	Qual.	Long jump	7.65 m	

== National titles ==
- Italian Athletics Championships
  - Long jump: 1999
- Italian Indoor Athletics Championships
  - Long jump: 1995

== See also ==
- Italian all-time lists - Long jump
