= Remi Korchemny =

Sprint coach involved in the 2003 BALCO doping scandal

Personal information
- Native name: Реми Корчемный
- Nationality: Ukrainian
- Citizenship: United States
- Born: 23 June 1932 (age 94) Ukraine
- Education: PhD in exercise physiology
- Occupation: Personal trainer
- Website: speedwithremi.com

Sport
- Sport: Sprint (coach)
- Retired: 12 March 2007

Achievements and titles
- Personal best: 100 m sprint: 10.4

Remi Korchemny (Russian: Реми Корчемный; born 23 June 1932) is the former sprint coach of a number of high-profile athletes, including Soviet Olympic champion Valeri Borzov and M40 record holder Ray Kimble. He is serving a lifetime ban from the sport for his involvement in providing performance-enhancing drugs.

After the 1972 Olympics, Korchemny moved to America and settled in New York. Start working in the beginning as a teacher and as a coach in track and field, he soon got excellent results with his athletes. He gave clinics to coaches in football and track and field sharing his knowledge how to develop speed. In 1983 he was invited to work for Stanford University in California, which he took advantage of and relocated. During that time he also worked with the San Francisco 49ers. After a little while, Remi was hired by the U.S. Army, to work on an Olympic development program.

Remi has trained and in some cases is still coaching a whole stable of past and current famous athletes, including Nonito Donaire Jr., Andre Ward, and Karim Mayfield

In the past he worked as a coach or advisor for a number of high-profile athletes, including British sprinter Dwain Chambers, and American athletes Kelli White, Chryste Gaines, Chris Phillips, Alvin Harrison, John Register and Jamaican athlete Grace Jackson.

== Life in the Soviet Union ==
Korchemny was born on 23 June 1932 in Ukraine. In 1937, when he was five years old, his father was executed by firing squad on charges of sabotage amid a labor dispute while his mother was sent to a forced labor camp for four years, leaving Korchemny to live with his grandparents. As an impoverished youth, he would race the boys at his school for food.

Drafted into the Red Army as an engineer, he was introduced to athletics, eventually becoming a coach in 1957. During the 1972 Munich Olympics, his sprinter Valeriy Borzov won the Olympic gold medals in the 100m and 200m. In 1975, after years of lobbying to leave the Soviet Union, Korchemny was allowed to move to the United States following brief stays in Israel and Italy.

== BALCO scandal ==
Korchemny was one of the figures in the 2003 BALCO scandal. He was indicted on 12 February 2004, and on 29 July 2005, he pleaded guilty in US District Court to distributing illegal performance-enhancing drugs to athletes between 2000 and 2003. Korchemny was sentenced to one year of probation on 24 February 2006, avoiding potential years of jail time. In the aftermath of the scandal, Korchemny agreed to retire on 12 March 2007. He was the first coach disciplined by the United States Anti-Doping Agency. Korchemny is serving a lifetime ban from USA Track & Field for conspiracy and cover-up.

== Post-scandal ==
In 2013, BALCO founder Victor Conte enlisted Korchemny to train the boxers he worked with such as Amir Khan, Nonito Donaire Jr., Andre Ward, and Karim Mayfield. In 2019, he coached professional boxer Mikey Garcia, who was contending for the IBF welterweight championship title against Errol Spence Jr.
