= Niels de Vos =

Niels Ernest de Vos (born 27 March 1967) is a British sports businessman and chief executive.

== Early life ==
He was born in Walsall. He attended King Edward's School, Birmingham. He studied Modern History from 1986-89 at Keble College, Oxford.

== Career ==
=== Sale Sharks ===
De Vos came to prominence as the Chief Executive of Sale Sharks, a professional rugby union club. De Vos helped the club move to a larger stadium in 2003, leaving Heywood Road in favour of Edgeley Park.

=== UK Athletics ===
In January 2007 he became the Chief Executive of the sporting governing body UK Athletics, headquartered in Birmingham. De Vos modernised the athletics body, cutting jobs and aiming to move sponsorship money away from headquarters costs and towards training centres athletics club. De Vos also cut down the number of athletes going to the 2008 Beijing Olympics, minimising the number to those who would still be young enough to perform at the 2012 London Olympics. He has a strong anti-doping stance, favouring a lifetime ban for athletes caught using banned substances. After attempting to ban Dwain Chambers from an athletics comeback, he underlined the damage Justin Gatlin caused to United States athletics as an example for his reasoning.

=== Fabric Group Ltd ===
In 2018 de Vos founded this specialist consultancy, advising governments, cities and businesses on investments into sport, the arts and communities.

=== Birmingham Museums Trust ===
In 2020 he was appointed Chair of the Trust’s board.

== Personal life ==
He is married (to Kirsten), with three children.

Business positions
Preceded by David Moorcroft	Chief Executive of UK Athletics; May 2007 - August 2019	Succeeded by vacancy
Preceded by	Commercial Director of Manchester 2002; 1999 - 2002	Succeeded by Position defunct
