= 2006 European Athletics Indoor Cup =

- Host city: Liévin, France
- Events: 19
- Dates: 5 March
- Main venue: Stade Couvert Régional

The 2006 European Athletics Indoor Cup was held on 5 March 2006 at the Stade Couvert Régional in Liévin, France. It was the third edition of the indoor track and field meeting for international teams, which featured the six top performing nations from the 2005 European Cup and the top two from the European Cup First League. Great Britain's women's team withdrew due to the Commonwealth Games in Melbourne, while the Italian women also withdrew as the dates coincided with their indoor national championships. The event was held a week prior to the 2006 IAAF World Indoor Championships in Moscow.

The competition featured nineteen athletics events ten for men and nine for women. The 400 metres race were held in a dual final format due to size constraints, with athletes' being assigned final positions through their finishing times. The international team points totals were decided by their athletes' finishing positions, with each representative's performance contributing towards their national overall score. The Russian women won the competition for a third consecutive time, holding a sixteen-point margin over runners-up Poland. The French men's team also repeated as champions, having won in 2004. Germany were the men's second placed team, while Spain just edged Poland into the third place spot.

The competition venue is also the annual host of the Meeting Pas de Calais.

== Results summary ==
=== Men ===
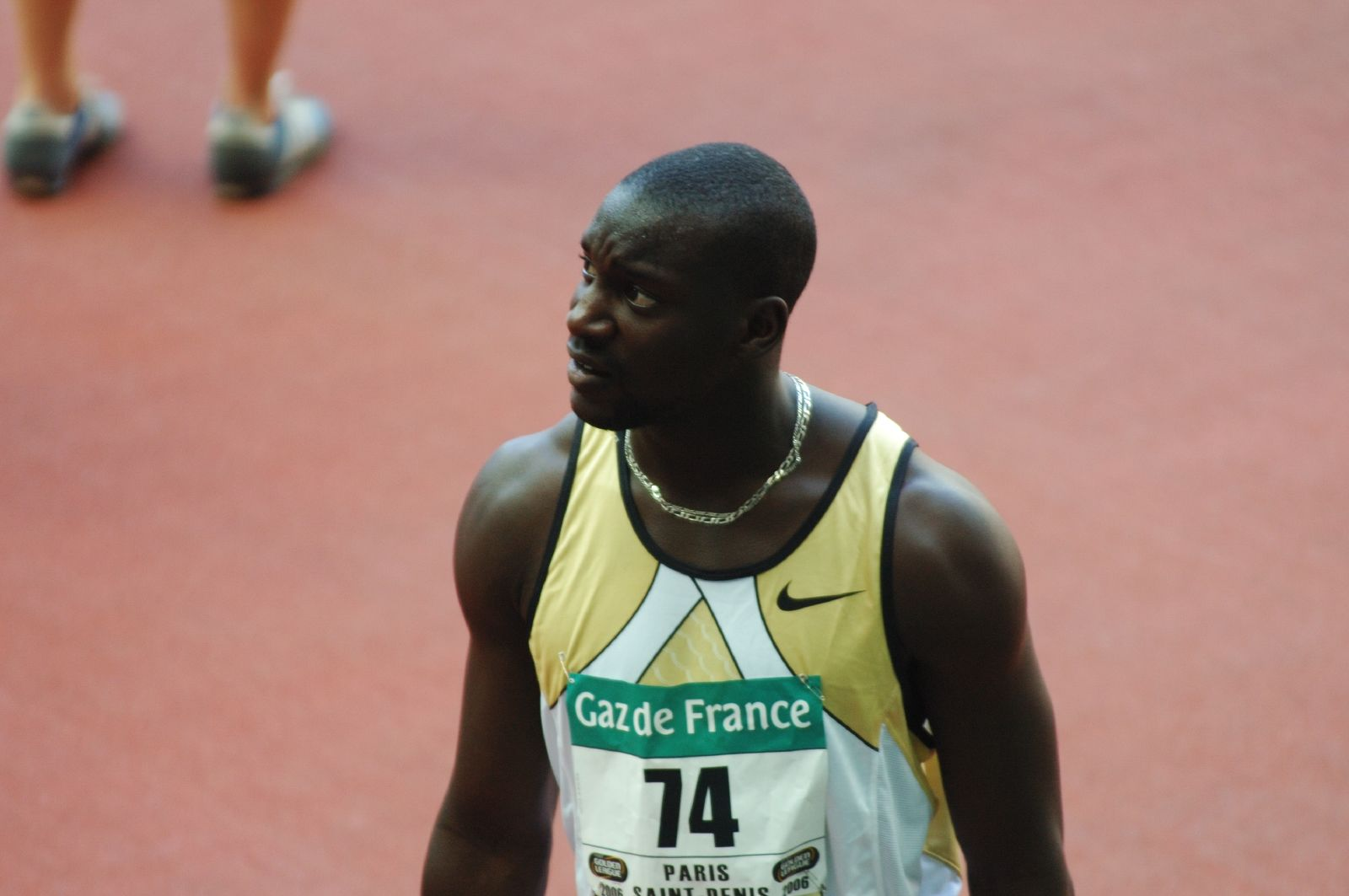
Reigning world champion Ladji Doucouré won the hurdles.

Event	Gold		Silver		Bronze	
60 metres	Ronald Pognon (FRA)	6.65	Anatoliy Dovhal (UKR)	6.70	Dariusz Kuć (POL)	6.73
400 metres	Daniel Dąbrowski (POL)	46.62	Ruwen Faller (GER)	46.89	Aleksey Rachkovskiy (UKR)	47.01
800 metres	Juan de Dios Jurado (ESP)	1:49.50	Maurizio Bobbato (ITA)	1:50.05	René Herms (GER)	1:50.06
1500 metres	Sergio Gallardo (ESP)	3:49.77	Guillaume Éraud (FRA)	3:50.66	Vasiliy Tsikalo (UKR)	3:50.74
3000 metres	Jan Fitschen (GER)	7:58.08	Badre Din Zioini (FRA)	8:03.63	Francisco Javier Alves (ESP)	8:04.78
60 metres hurdles	Ladji Doucouré (FRA)	7.62	Mike Fenner (GER)	7.69	Olli Talsi (FIN)	7.74
Swedish relay (800/600/400/200 m)	Russia (RUS); Yuriy Koldin; Dmitriy Bogdanov; Aleksandr Usov; Ivan Teplykh	4:15.93	France (FRA); Romain Maquin; Kévin Hautcœur; Brice Panel; Idrissa M'Barke	4:16.20	Germany (GER); Moritz Waldmann; Steffen Co; Florian Seitz; Sebastian Ernst	4:17.39
High jump	Ivan Ukhov (RUS)	2.26 m	Andrea Bettinelli (ITA)	2.26 m	Javier Bermejo (ESP)	2.26 m
Long jump	Olexiy Lukashevych (UKR)	7.88 m	Salim Sdiri (FRA)	7.85 m	Peter Rapp (GER)	7.82 m
Shot put	Tomasz Majewski (POL)	20.60 m	Ralf Bartels (GER)	20.59 m	Manuel Martínez (ESP)	20.09 m

=== Women ===
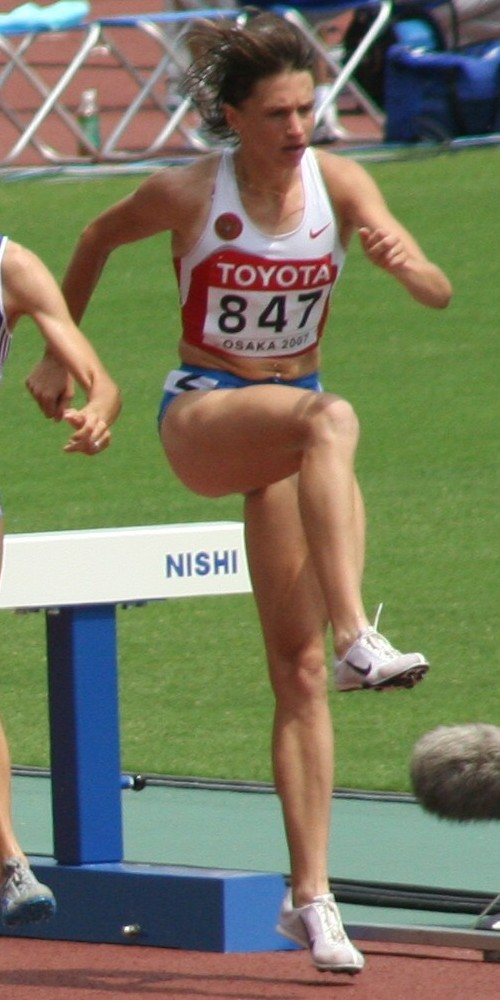
Russia's Yekaterina Volkova won the 3000 m.

Event	Gold		Silver		Bronze	
60 metres	Christine Arron (FRA)	7.16	Olga Khalandyreva (RUS)	7.29	Angela Moroșanu (ROM)	7.32
400 metres	Tatyana Veshkurova (RUS)	51.67	Monika Bejnar (POL)	52.45	Claudia Hoffmann (GER)	52.69
800 metres	Maria Cioncan (ROM)	2:02.21	Ewelina Sętowska (POL)	2:02.58	Svetlana Cherkasova (RUS)	2:02.78
1500 metres	Olga Komyagina (RUS)	4:10.23	Anna Jakubczak (POL)	4:13.23	Nataliya Tobias (UKR)	4:15.39
3000 metres	Yekaterina Volkova (RUS)	8:59.70	Antje Möldner (GER)	9:01.07	Tetyana Holovchenko (UKR)	9:04.88
60 metres hurdles	Susanna Kallur (SWE)	7.95	Glory Alozie (ESP)	7.99	Aurelia Trywiańska (POL)	8.00
Swedish relay (800/600/400/200 m)	Russia (RUS); Irina Vashentseva; Mariya Dryakhlova; Tatyana Firova; Natalya Ivanova	4:47.48	Romania (ROM); Mihaela Neacsu; Iuliana Popescu; Angela Moroșanu; Ionela Tîrlea-Manolache	4:49.96	Poland (POL); Lidia Chojecka; Małgorzata Pskit; Marta Chrust-Rożej; Grażyna Prokopek	4:50.96
Pole vault	Anna Rogowska (POL)	4.80 m	Tatyana Polnova (RUS)	4.50 m	Martina Strutz (GER)	4.40 m
Triple jump	Oksana Rogova (RUS)	14.08 m	Mariana Solomon (ROM)	14.04 m	Theresa N'Zola (FRA)	13.97 m

== Medal table ==
Key

The host country is highlighted in lavender blue

Men
Rank	Nation	Points total	Gold	Silver	Bronze	Medal total
1	France	59	2	4	0	6
2	Germany	54	1	3	3	7
3	Spain	50	2	0	3	5
4	Poland	50	2	0	1	3
5	Ukraine	47	1	1	2	4
6	Russia	41	2	0	0	2
7	Italy	38	0	2	0	2
8	Finland	27	0	0	1	1
Total			10	10	10	30

Women
Rank	Nation	Points total	Gold	Silver	Bronze	Medal total
1	Russia	69	5	2	1	8
2	Poland	53	1	3	2	6
3	Romania	46	1	2	1	4
4	France	41	1	0	1	2
5	Germany	38	0	1	2	3
6	Spain	32	0	1	0	1
7	Ukraine	29	0	0	2	2
8	Sweden	22	1	0	0	1
Total			9	9	9	27
