= Maurizio Bobbato =

Italian middle-distance runner

Personal information
- Nationality: Italian
- Born: 17 February 1979 (age 47) Castelfranco Veneto, Italy
- Height: 1.89 m (6 ft 2 1/2 in)
- Weight: 70 kg (154 lb)

Sport
- Country: Italy
- Sport: Athletics
- Event: Middle distance running
- Club: C.S. Carabinieri

Achievements and titles
- Personal bests: 800 m (2,624 ft 8 in)93 (2006); 1,500 m (4,921 ft 3 in)75 (2005); 800 m indoor: 1'48"71 (2007); 1500 m indoor: 3'44"33 (2005)
Medal record
Men's athletics
European Indoor Championships
Bronze medal – third place	2007 Birmingham	800 m
European Indoor Cup
Silver medal – second place	2006 Liévin	800 m

Maurizio Bobbato (born 17 February 1979) is an Italian middle-distance runner, who won a bronze medal in Birmingham at the 2007 European Athletics Indoor Championships.

== Biography ==
Bobbato is a 5-time winner of the Italian national championships.

== Achievements ==
Year	Competition	Venue	Position	Event	Notes
Representing Italy
1998	World Junior Championships	Annecy, France	19th (h)	1500m	3:54.14
2005	World Championships	Helsinki, Finland	elim. heat	800 metres	1'48"36
2006	European Indoor Cup	Liévin, France	2nd	800 metres	1'50"05
2006	European Championships	Gothenburg, Sweden	elim. heat	800 metres	1'48"21
2007	European Indoor Championships	Birmingham, United Kingdom	3rd	800 metres	1'48"71

== National titles ==
- 1 win in 800 metres at the Italian Athletics Championships (2006)
- 3 wins in 800 metres at the Italian Athletics Indoor Championships (2005, 2006, 2007)
- 1 win in 1500 metres at the Italian Athletics Indoor Championships (2007)
