= Daniel Zegeye =

Ethiopian middle-distance runner

Daniel Zegeye (born 13 March 1979 in Arusi) is a retired Ethiopian middle distance runner who specialized in 1500 metres.

He finished tenth at the 1998 World Junior Championships and sixth at the 2000 Olympic Games. He then competed at the 2001 World Indoor Championships and the 2001 World Championships without reaching the finals.

He has not competed on top international level since 2003. His personal best time was 3:36.33 minutes, achieved in August 2000 in Linz.
