= European Athletics Indoor Cup =

Sporting event in Europe

- Sport: Athletics
- Founded: 2003
- No. of teams: 11 (2008)
- Continent: Europe

The European Athletics Indoor Cup was a biennial (formerly annual) athletics sporting event that first took place in 2003 in Leipzig, Germany, where it was also organized the following year. The 3rd edition was held in 2006, in order to be held every two years to alternate with the European Indoor Championships in Athletics, but had its final edition in 2008. The event was organized by the European Athletic Association (EAA).

The purpose of the competition was to provide an international team competition at an indoor track and field event.

== List of competitions ==
Year	City	Country	Date	Venue	Winner	
Year	City	Country	Date	Venue	Men	Women
2003	Leipzig	Germany	15 February 2003	Leipzig Arena	Spain	Russia
2004	Leipzig	Germany	14 February 2004	Leipzig Arena	France	Russia
2006	Liévin	France	5 March 2006	Stade Couvert Régional	France	Russia
2008	Moscow	Russia	16 February 2008	CSKA Arena	Russia	Russia
