= 2004 World Junior Championships in Athletics – Women's 4 × 100 metres relay =

Women's 4×100 metres relay at 2004 World Junior Championship in Athletics

The women's 4×100 metres relay event at the 2004 World Junior Championships in Athletics was held in Grosseto, Italy, at Stadio Olimpico Carlo Zecchini on 17 and 18 July.

== Medalists ==
Gold	Ashley Owens; Juanita Broaddus; Jasmine Baldwin; Shalonda Solomon; United States
Silver	Nickesha Anderson; Tracy-Ann Rowe; Anneisha McLaughlin; Schillonie Calvert; Jamaica
Bronze	Natacha Vouaux; Lina Jacques-Sébastien; Aurélie Kamga; Nelly Banco; France

== Results ==
=== Final ===
18 July

Rank	Nation	Competitors	Time	Notes
1st place, gold medalist(s)	United States	Ashley Owens; Juanita Broaddus; Jasmine Baldwin; Shalonda Solomon	43.49	
2nd place, silver medalist(s)	Jamaica	Nickesha Anderson; Tracy-Ann Rowe; Anneisha McLaughlin; Schillonie Calvert	43.63	
3rd place, bronze medalist(s)	France	Natacha Vouaux; Lina Jacques-Sébastien; Aurélie Kamga; Nelly Banco	43.68	
4	Trinidad and Tobago	Jurlene Francis; Wanda Hutson; Monique Cabral; Kelly-Ann Baptiste	44.14	
5	Australia	Jacinta Boyd; Sally McLellan; Michelle Cutmore; Rebecca Negus	45.10	
6	Italy	Claudia Pacini; Maria Salvagno; Giulia Arcioni; Simona Ciglia	45.19	
7	Poland	Agnieszka Kasica; Marika Popowicz; Iwona Brzezinska; Marta Jeschke	45.34	
	Germany	Verena Sailer; Katja Börner; Maike Dix; Anne Möllinger	DQ	IAAF rule 170.14

=== Heats ===
17 July

==== Heat 1 ====
Rank	Nation	Competitors	Time	Notes
1	United States	Ashley Owens; Juanita Broaddus; Jasmine Baldwin; Cleo Tyson	44.00	Q
2	Poland	Agnieszka Kasica; Marika Popowicz; Iwona Brzezinska; Marta Jeschke	44.78	Q
3	Italy	Claudia Pacini; Maria Salvagno; Giulia Arcioni; Simona Ciglia	44.82	q
4	South Africa	Cindy Stewart; Amanda Kotze; Thandi Mngwevu; Isabel Le Roux	45.30	
5	Japan	Azusa Ichiki; Asami Tanno; Kaoru Matsuda; Saori Kitakaze	45.80	
	Ireland	Aoife McNeil; Mandy Crowe; Claire Brady; Louise Kiernan	DQ	IAAF rule 170.14

==== Heat 2 ====
Rank	Nation	Competitors	Time	Notes
1	Trinidad and Tobago	Jurlene Francis; Wanda Hutson; Monique Cabral; Kelly-Ann Baptiste	44.29	Q
2	Australia	Jacinta Boyd; Sally McLellan; Michelle Cutmore; Rebecca Negus	44.86	Q
3	Switzerland	Fabienne Weyermann; Sabrina Altermatt; Giorgia Candiani; Irene Pusterla	45.77	
4	Norway	Christine Lia; Christina Vukicevic; Marie Hagle; Thea Oppegaard	46.54	
	Mexico	Ana Coutinho; Deneb Cervantes; Gabriela Medina; Zudikey Rodríguez	DQ	IAAF rule 170.14
	Ukraine	Yuliya Semenova; Galina Tonkovyd; Natalya Pogrebnyak; Sevil Ibrahimova	DQ	IAAF rule 170.14

==== Heat 3 ====
Rank	Nation	Competitors	Time	Notes
1	France	Natacha Vouaux; Lina Jacques-Sébastien; Aurélie Kamga; Nelly Banco	43.85	Q
2	Germany	Verena Sailer; Katja Börner; Maike Dix; Anne Möllinger	44.58	Q
3	Jamaica	Schillonie Calvert; Tracy-Ann Rowe; Jodi-Ann Powell; Kimberly Smith	45.14	q
4	Canada	Francis Keating; Carline Muir; Emily Johnson; Genevieve Thibault	45.23	
5	Finland	Emma Linton; Minna Laukka; Sari Keskitalo; Elisa Hakamäki	45.31	
	Sweden	Annika Andersson; Maria Teilman; Pernilla Tornemark; Mfon Etim	DNF	

== Participation ==
According to an unofficial count, 75 athletes from 18 countries participated in the event.

- Australia (4)
- Canada (4)
- Finland (4)
- France (4)
- Germany (4)
- Ireland (4)
- Italy (4)
- Jamaica (6)
- Japan (4)
- Mexico (4)
- Norway (4)
- Poland (4)
- South Africa (4)
- Sweden (4)
- Switzerland (4)
- Trinidad and Tobago (4)
- Ukraine (4)
- United States (5)
