= 2004 World Junior Championships in Athletics – Women's 200 metres =

The women's 200 metres event at the 2004 World Junior Championships in Athletics was held in Grosseto, Italy, at Stadio Olimpico Carlo Zecchini on 15 and 16 July.

== Medalists ==
Gold	Shalonda Solomon; United States
Silver	Anneisha McLaughlin; Jamaica
Bronze	Nickesha Anderson; Jamaica

== Results ==
=== Final ===
16 July
Wind: -0.2 m/s

Rank	Name	Nationality	Time	Notes
1st place, gold medalist(s)	Shalonda Solomon	United States	22.82	
2nd place, silver medalist(s)	Anneisha McLaughlin	Jamaica	23.21	
3rd place, bronze medalist(s)	Nickesha Anderson	Jamaica	23.46	
4	Kelly-Ann Baptiste	Trinidad and Tobago	23.46	
5	Shana Cox	United States	23.63	
6	Maike Dix	Germany	24.01	
7	Seyi Omojuwa	Nigeria	24.11	
8	Aurélie Kamga	France	24.17	

=== Semifinals ===
15 July

==== Semifinal 1 ====
Wind: +0.7 m/s

Rank	Name	Nationality	Time	Notes
1	Nickesha Anderson	Jamaica	23.55	Q
2	Aurélie Kamga	France	23.89	Q
3	Shana Cox	United States	23.90	q
4	Danijela Grgić	Croatia	24.19	
5	Franciela Krasucki	Brazil	24.22	
6	Marta Jeschke	Poland	24.51	
7	Carline Muir	Canada	24.55	
8	Rebecca Negus	Australia	24.62	

==== Semifinal 2 ====
Wind: +0.7 m/s

Rank	Name	Nationality	Time	Notes
1	Shalonda Solomon	United States	23.13	Q
2	Kelly-Ann Baptiste	Trinidad and Tobago	23.53	Q
3	Sara Battke	Germany	24.23	
4	Sari Keskitalo	Finland	24.48	
5	Isabel Le Roux	South Africa	24.60	
6	Mandy Crowe	Ireland	24.69	
7	Kaoru Matsuda	Japan	25.00	
	Elisabeth Slettum	Norway	DNS	

==== Semifinal 3 ====
Wind: +0.5 m/s

Rank	Name	Nationality	Time	Notes
1	Anneisha McLaughlin	Jamaica	23.41	Q
2	Maike Dix	Germany	23.76	Q
3	Seyi Omojuwa	Nigeria	23.81	q
4	Viktoriya Talko	Russia	23.96	
5	Michelle Cutmore	Australia	24.02	
6	Nelly Banco	France	24.16	
7	Tezdzhan Naimova	Bulgaria	24.44	
8	Sherry Fletcher	Grenada	24.61	

=== Heats ===
15 July

==== Heat 1 ====
Wind: +0.5 m/s

Rank	Name	Nationality	Time	Notes
1	Mandy Crowe	Ireland	24.18	Q
2	Isabel Le Roux	South Africa	24.24	Q
3	Danijela Grgić	Croatia	24.26	Q
4	Rebecca Negus	Australia	24.35	q
5	Gretta Taslakian	Lebanon	24.52	
6	Emily Johnson	Canada	24.53	
7	Pınar Saka	Turkey	25.43	

==== Heat 2 ====
Wind: +0.1 m/s

Rank	Name	Nationality	Time	Notes
1	Nickesha Anderson	Jamaica	23.52	Q
2	Seyi Omojuwa	Nigeria	23.69	Q
3	Sara Battke	Germany	23.73	Q
4	Sari Keskitalo	Finland	24.07	q
5	Carline Muir	Canada	24.34	q
6	Anja Puc	Slovenia	24.72	
7	Céline Pace	Malta	25.08	

==== Heat 3 ====
Wind: +1.3 m/s

Rank	Name	Nationality	Time	Notes
1	Aurélie Kamga	France	23.37	Q
2	Kelly-Ann Baptiste	Trinidad and Tobago	23.41	Q
3	Maike Dix	Germany	23.79	Q
4	Michelle Cutmore	Australia	24.20	q
5	Zudikey Rodríguez	Mexico	24.99	
6	Gaileen van der Westhuizen	South Africa	25.49	

==== Heat 4 ====
Wind: +0.3 m/s

Rank	Name	Nationality	Time	Notes
1	Shalonda Solomon	United States	23.14	Q
2	Marta Jeschke	Poland	24.02	Q
3	Franciela Krasucki	Brazil	24.13	Q
4	Elisabeth Slettum	Norway	24.40	q
5	Desarie Walwyn	Saint Kitts and Nevis	24.89	
6	Zsófia Rózsa	Hungary	25.20	
7	Steina Fleming	British Virgin Islands	26.41	

==== Heat 5 ====
Wind: +1.2 m/s

Rank	Name	Nationality	Time	Notes
1	Anneisha McLaughlin	Jamaica	23.27	Q
2	Viktoriya Talko	Russia	24.02	Q
3	Kaoru Matsuda	Japan	24.48	Q
4	Jana Polívková	Czech Republic	24.51	
5	Sabina Veit	Slovenia	24.63	
6	Giulia Arcioni	Italy	24.75	
	Yomara Hinestroza	Colombia	DQ	IAAF rule 163.3

==== Heat 6 ====
Wind: +0.5 m/s

Rank	Name	Nationality	Time	Notes
1	Nelly Banco	France	23.85	Q
2	Shana Cox	United States	23.91	Q
3	Sherry Fletcher	Grenada	24.36	Q
4	Tezdzhan Naimova	Bulgaria	24.38	q
5	Monique Williams	New Zealand	24.43	
6	Tamara Rigby	Bahamas	24.69	
7	Miriama Radiniwaimaro	Fiji	25.43	

== Participation ==
According to an unofficial count, 41 athletes from 33 countries participated in the event.

- Australia (2)
- Bahamas (1)
- Brazil (1)
- British Virgin Islands (1)
- Bulgaria (1)
- Canada (2)
- Colombia (1)
- Croatia (1)
- Czech Republic (1)
- Fiji (1)
- Finland (1)
- France (2)
- Germany (2)
- Grenada (1)
- Hungary (1)
- Ireland (1)
- Italy (1)
- Jamaica (2)
- Japan (1)
- Lebanon (1)
- Malta (1)
- Mexico (1)
- New Zealand (1)
- Nigeria (1)
- Norway (1)
- Poland (1)
- Russia (1)
- Saint Kitts and Nevis (1)
- Slovenia (2)
- South Africa (2)
- Trinidad and Tobago (1)
- Turkey (1)
- United States (2)
