= 2007 European Athletics U23 Championships – Women's 200 metres =

The women's 200 metres event at the 2007 European Athletics U23 Championships was held in Debrecen, Hungary, at Gyulai István Atlétikai Stadion on 13 and 14 July.

== Medalists ==
Gold	Yuliya Chermoshanskaya; Russia
Silver	Nelly Banco; France
Bronze	Marta Jeschke; Poland

== Results ==
=== Final ===
14 July
Wind: -1.1 m/s

Rank	Name	Nationality	Time	Notes
1st place, gold medalist(s)	Yuliya Chermoshanskaya	Russia	23.19	
2nd place, silver medalist(s)	Nelly Banco	France	23.36	
3rd place, bronze medalist(s)	Marta Jeschke	Poland	23.42	
4	Ewelina Klocek	Poland	23.45	
5	Yelena Novikova	Russia	23.48	
6	Olivia Borlée	Belgium	23.57	
7	Montell Douglas	United Kingdom	23.63	
8	Olha Andreyeva	Ukraine	23.90	

=== Semifinals ===
14 July
Qualified: first 4 in each heat to the Final

==== Semifinal 1 ====
Wind: -0.6 m/s

Rank	Name	Nationality	Time	Notes
1	Nelly Banco	France	23.29	Q
2	Ewelina Klocek	Poland	23.38	Q
3	Olivia Borlée	Belgium	23.39	Q
4	Montell Douglas	United Kingdom	23.42	Q
5	Halyna Tonkovyd	Ukraine	23.71	
6	Lina Grinčikaitė	Lithuania	23.73	
7	Kseniya Vdovina	Russia	23.80	
8	Sari Keskitalo	Finland	24.06	

==== Semifinal 2 ====
Wind: -0.2 m/s

Rank	Name	Nationality	Time	Notes
1	Yuliya Chermoshanskaya	Russia	23.33	Q
2	Marta Jeschke	Poland	23.36	Q
3	Yelena Novikova	Russia	23.37	Q
4	Olha Andreyeva	Ukraine	23.45	Q
5	Eleni Artymata	Cyprus	23.46	
6	Kadi-Ann Thomas	United Kingdom	23.57	
7	Elisabeth Slettum	Norway	23.72	
8	Amandine Elard	France	23.95	

=== Heats ===
13 July
Qualified: first 3 in each heat and 4 best to the Semifinal

==== Heat 1 ====
Wind: 0.3 m/s

Rank	Name	Nationality	Time	Notes
1	Nelly Banco	France	23.47	Q
2	Marta Jeschke	Poland	23.50	Q
3	Yelena Novikova	Russia	23.51	Q
4	Halyna Tonkovyd	Ukraine	23.69	q
5	Sabina Veit	Slovenia	23.95	
6	Giulia Arcioni	Italy	24.16	
7	Eva Martín	Spain	24.33	
8	Rita Pogorelov	Israel	24.73	

==== Heat 2 ====
Wind: 0.1 m/s

Rank	Name	Nationality	Time	Notes
1	Eleni Artymata	Cyprus	23.39	Q
2	Montell Douglas	United Kingdom	23.62	Q
3	Kseniya Vdovina	Russia	23.66	Q
4	Sari Keskitalo	Finland	23.87	q
5	Lina Andrijauskaitė	Lithuania	24.16	
6	Elodie Barre	France	24.16	
7	Yuliya Irhina	Ukraine	24.31	
8	Ekaterini Karatza	Greece	24.56	

==== Heat 3 ====
Wind: 0.1 m/s

Rank	Name	Nationality	Time	Notes
1	Yuliya Chermoshanskaya	Russia	23.34	Q
2	Olha Andreyeva	Ukraine	23.42	Q
3	Lina Grinčikaitė	Lithuania	23.46	Q
4	Elisabeth Slettum	Norway	23.48	q
5	Amandine Elard	France	23.87	q
6	Mareike Peters	Germany	23.90	
7	Martina Dostálová	Czech Republic	24.38	
8	Monika Ivanova	Bulgaria	24.59	

==== Heat 4 ====
Wind: 0.1 m/s

Rank	Name	Nationality	Time	Notes
1	Ewelina Klocek	Poland	23.26	Q
2	Olivia Borlée	Belgium	23.33	Q
3	Kadi-Ann Thomas	United Kingdom	23.81	Q
4	Maike Dix	Germany	24.02	
5	Agni Derveni	Greece	24.20	
6	Zsófia Rózsa	Hungary	24.57	
7	Pia Tajnikar	Slovenia	24.63	
8	Charlene Attard	Malta	24.76	

== Participation ==
According to an unofficial count, 32 athletes from 20 countries participated in the event.

- Belgium (1)
- Bulgaria (1)
- Cyprus (1)
- Czech Republic (1)
- Finland (1)
- France (3)
- Germany (2)
- Greece (2)
- Hungary (1)
- Israel (1)
- Italy (1)
- Lithuania (2)
- Malta (1)
- Norway (1)
- Poland (2)
- Russia (3)
- Slovenia (2)
- Spain (1)
- Ukraine (3)
- United Kingdom (2)
