= 2004 World Junior Championships in Athletics – Women's 100 metres =

The women's 100 metres event at the 2004 World Junior Championships in Athletics was held in Grosseto, Italy, at Stadio Olimpico Carlo Zecchini on 13 and 14 July.

== Medalists ==
Gold	Ashley Owens; United States
Silver	Jasmine Baldwin; United States
Bronze	Sally McLellan; Australia

== Results ==
=== Final ===
14 July
Wind: +1.5 m/s

Rank	Name	Nationality	Time	Notes
1st place, gold medalist(s)	Ashley Owens	United States	11.13	
2nd place, silver medalist(s)	Jasmine Baldwin	United States	11.34	
3rd place, bronze medalist(s)	Sally McLellan	Australia	11.40	
4	Wanda Hutson	Trinidad and Tobago	11.45	
5	Verena Sailer	Germany	11.49	
6	Lina Jacques-Sébastien	France	11.58	
7	Schillonie Calvert	Jamaica	11.60	
8	Wang Wenshan	China	11.70	

=== Semifinals ===
13 July

==== Semifinal 1 ====
Wind: -0.1 m/s

Rank	Name	Nationality	Time	Notes
1	Jasmine Baldwin	United States	11.46	Q
2	Sally McLellan	Australia	11.49	Q
3	Wang Wenshan	China	11.68	q
4	Verena Sailer	Germany	11.69	q
5	Lina Grinčikaitė	Lithuania	11.71	
6	Genevieve Thibault	Canada	11.74	
7	Franciela Krasucki	Brazil	11.86	
8	Ruth Conde	Spain	11.98	

==== Semifinal 2 ====
Wind: +0.6 m/s

Rank	Name	Nationality	Time	Notes
1	Ashley Owens	United States	11.35	Q
2	Schillonie Calvert	Jamaica	11.77	Q
3	Lucy Sargent	United Kingdom	11.77	
4	Jodi-Ann Powell	Jamaica	11.81	
5	Katja Börner	Germany	11.85	
6	Maria Salvagno	Italy	11.88	
7	Yomara Hinestroza	Colombia	12.24	
	Seyi Omojuwa	Nigeria	DNS	

==== Semifinal 3 ====
Wind: +0.1 m/s

Rank	Name	Nationality	Time	Notes
1	Wanda Hutson	Trinidad and Tobago	11.60	Q
2	Lina Jacques-Sébastien	France	11.69	Q
3	Iwona Brzezinska	Poland	11.74	
4	Sari Keskitalo	Finland	11.83	
5	Cindy Stewart	South Africa	11.95	
6	Saori Kitakaze	Japan	12.00	
7	Rhonda-Kaye Trusty	Canada	12.07	
8	Tamara Rigby	Bahamas	12.08	

=== Heats ===
13 July

==== Heat 1 ====
Wind: -0.4 m/s

Rank	Name	Nationality	Time	Notes
1	Schillonie Calvert	Jamaica	11.79	Q
2	Maria Salvagno	Italy	11.94	Q
3	Yomara Hinestroza	Colombia	12.04	Q
4	Michelle Cutmore	Australia	12.05	
5	Yuliya Semenova	Ukraine	12.15	
6	Zsófia Rózsa	Hungary	12.19	
7	Deneb Cervantes	Mexico	12.36	

==== Heat 2 ====
Wind: +0.9 m/s

Rank	Name	Nationality	Time	Notes
1	Wanda Hutson	Trinidad and Tobago	11.58	Q
2	Seyi Omojuwa	Nigeria	11.60	Q
3	Sari Keskitalo	Finland	11.77	Q
4	Rhonda-Kaye Trusty	Canada	11.85	q
5	Ruth Conde	Spain	11.85	q
6	Kaoru Matsuda	Japan	12.06	
7	Monika Ivanova	Bulgaria	12.08	

==== Heat 3 ====
Wind: +0.6 m/s

Rank	Name	Nationality	Time	Notes
1	Ashley Owens	United States	11.47	Q
2	Cindy Stewart	South Africa	11.85	Q
3	Saori Kitakaze	Japan	11.99	Q
4	Tamara Rigby	Bahamas	12.01	q
5	Ayodelé Ikuesan	France	12.02	
6	Desarie Walwyn	Saint Kitts and Nevis	12.26	
7	Margaret Teiti	Cook Islands	13.37	

==== Heat 4 ====
Wind: +0.3 m/s

Rank	Name	Nationality	Time	Notes
1	Verena Sailer	Germany	11.58	Q
2	Lina Jacques-Sébastien	France	11.69	Q
3	Lucy Sargent	United Kingdom	11.72	Q
4	Maja Golub	Croatia	12.09	
5	Isabel Le Roux	South Africa	12.13	
6	Victoria Tjingaete	Namibia	12.47	
7	Ludmila Leal	São Tomé and Príncipe	12.58	
8	Aiza Cometa	Philippines	13.73	

==== Heat 5 ====
Wind: -0.7 m/s

Rank	Name	Nationality	Time	Notes
1	Sally McLellan	Australia	11.66	Q
2	Jasmine Baldwin	United States	11.72	Q
3	Franciela Krasucki	Brazil	11.80	Q
4	Genevieve Thibault	Canada	11.93	q
5	Katja Börner	Germany	12.02	q
6	Zudikey Rodríguez	Mexico	12.19	

==== Heat 6 ====
Wind: -0.1 m/s

Rank	Name	Nationality	Time	Notes
1	Iwona Brzezinska	Poland	11.77	Q
2	Wang Wenshan	China	11.77	Q
3	Lina Grinčikaitė	Lithuania	11.78	Q
4	Jodi-Ann Powell	Jamaica	11.82	q
5	Louise Kiernan	Ireland	12.02	
6	Natalya Pogrebnyak	Ukraine	12.04	
7	Monique Cabral	Trinidad and Tobago	12.04	
8	Chiara Gervasi	Italy	12.13	

== Participation ==
According to an unofficial count, 43 athletes from 31 countries participated in the event.

- Australia (2)
- Bahamas (1)
- Brazil (1)
- Bulgaria (1)
- Canada (2)
- China (1)
- Colombia (1)
- Cook Islands (1)
- Croatia (1)
- Finland (1)
- France (2)
- Germany (2)
- Hungary (1)
- Ireland (1)
- Italy (2)
- Jamaica (2)
- Japan (2)
- Lithuania (1)
- Mexico (2)
- Namibia (1)
- Nigeria (1)
- Philippines (1)
- Poland (1)
- Saint Kitts and Nevis (1)
- São Tomé and Príncipe (1)
- South Africa (2)
- Spain (1)
- Trinidad and Tobago (2)
- Ukraine (2)
- United Kingdom (1)
- United States (2)
