= Athletics at the 2009 Summer Universiade – Women's 200 metres =

The women's 200 metres event at the 2009 Summer Universiade was held on 9–10 July.

== Medalists ==
Gold	Silver	Bronze
Monique Willams; New Zealand	Isabel Le Roux; South Africa	Sabina Veit; Slovenia

== Results ==
=== Heats ===
Qualification: First 3 of each heat (Q) and the next 6 fastest (q) qualified for the semifinals.

Wind:
Heat 1: -0.2 m/s, Heat 2: +0.5 m/s, Heat 3: +0.7 m/s, Heat 4: +1.2 m/s, Heat 5: +1.1 m/s, Heat 6: +1.3 m/s

Rank	Heat	Name	Nationality	Time	Notes
1	2	Monique Willams	New Zealand	23.55	Q
2	2	Yekaterina Voronenkova	Russia	23.65	Q, SB
3	6	Giulia Arcioni	Italy	23.75	Q, PB
4	4	Sabina Veit	Slovenia	23.80	Q
5	2	Marta Jeschke	Poland	23.85	Q
6	3	Isabel Le Roux	South Africa	23.87	Q
7	5	Kimberly Hyacinthe	Canada	23.90	Q
8	3	Amonn Nelson	Canada	24.05	Q
9	3	Olga Pervyakova	Russia	24.06	Q
10	5	Hanne Marien	Belgium	24.07	Q
11	9	Pia Tajnikar	Slovenia	24.09	Q
12	1	Melissa Breen	Australia	24.14	Q
13	1	Amandine Elard	France	24.22	Q
14	5	Eva Martín	Spain	24.25	Q
15	4	Andrea Koenen	New Zealand	24.27	Q
16	5	Lina Andrijauskaitė	Lithuania	24.29	q
17	3	Doris Tomasini	Italy	24.30	q
18	5	Jelena Subotić	Serbia	24.32	q
19	5	Catharine Horn	South Africa	24.39	q
20	3	Iwona Brzezińska	Poland	24.51	q
21	3	Joanne Cuddihy	Ireland	24.54	q
21	6	Mildred Gamba	Uganda	24.54	Q, PB
23	4	Vaya Vladeva	Bulgaria	24.71	Q
24	4	Joanna Patterson	Ireland	24.97	
25	2	Emily Nanziri	Uganda	25.00	
26	2	Leng Mei	China	25.03	
27	4	Lorène Bazolo	Republic of the Congo	25.15	Q
28	6	Ivana Rožman	Macedonia	25.38	
29	2	Tang Uen Shan	Hong Kong	25.40	
30	4	Millisand de la Paz	Netherlands Antilles	25.41	
31	1	Inesa Rimkevičiūtė	Lithuania	25.48	
32	3	Fatou Diabaye	Senegal	25.90	
33	2	Temalangeni Dlamini	Swaziland	25.97	PB
34	4	Madiha Latif	Pakistan	26.63	
35	1	Sarita Morales	Costa Rica	26.74	
36	2	Reginah Rakumako	Botswana	26.75	PB
37	4	Dao Thi Ha	Vietnam	27.95	
38	4	Keikanyemang Ngande	Botswana	29.78	
	6	Tatjana Mitić	Serbia	DQ	
	1	Halimat Ismaila	Nigeria	DNS	
	1	Momoko Takahashi	Japan	DNS	
	3	Olivia Precious Kizze	Nigeria	DNS	
	5	Julie Schmidt-Scherer	Denmark	DNS	
	6	Inonge Ilubala	Zambia	DNS	
	6	Marie-Josée Lukaku	Democratic Republic of the Congo	DNS	

=== Semifinals ===
Qualification: First 2 of each semifinal (Q) and the next 2 fastest (q) qualified for the finals.

Wind:
Heat 1: +0.9 m/s, Heat 2: +1.0 m/s, Heat 3: +2.6 m/s

Rank	Heat	Name	Nationality	Time	Notes
1	3	Isabel Le Roux	South Africa	23.39	Q
2	2	Monique Willams	New Zealand	23.44	Q
3	3	Sabina Veit	Slovenia	23.50	Q
4	2	Marta Jeschke	Poland	23.56	Q
5	3	Kimberly Hyacinthe	Canada	23.58	q
6	2	Yekaterina Voronenkova	Russia	23.68	q
7	1	Amandine Elard	France	23.73	Q, SB
8	3	Olga Pervyakova	Russia	23.89	
9	1	Amonn Nelson	Canada	23.91	Q
10	1	Hanne Marien	Belgium	24.02	
11	1	Catharine Horn	South Africa	24.05	
12	1	Eva Martín	Spain	24.06	
13	3	Doris Tomasini	Italy	24.08	
14	2	Melissa Breen	Australia	24.12	
15	3	Andrea Koenen	New Zealand	24.14	
16	1	Jelena Subotić	Serbia	24.20	
17	1	Pia Tajnikar	Slovenia	24.34	
18	1	Mildred Gamba	Uganda	24.38	PB
19	3	Vaya Vladeva	Bulgaria	24.47	
20	2	Joanne Cuddihy	Ireland	24.53	
21	2	Lorène Bazolo	Republic of the Congo	25.24	
	2	Giulia Arcioni	Italy	DQ	
	3	Iwona Brzezińska	Poland	DNF	
	2	Lina Andrijauskaitė	Lithuania	DNS	

=== Final ===
Wind: +0.4 m/s

Rank	Lane	Name	Nationality	Time	Notes
1st place, gold medalist(s)	3	Monique Willams	New Zealand	23.11	
2nd place, silver medalist(s)	5	Isabel Le Roux	South Africa	23.18	
3rd place, bronze medalist(s)	6	Sabina Veit	Slovenia	23.34	SB
4	6	Yekaterina Voronenkova	Russia	23.59	SB
5	8	Marta Jeschke	Poland	23.65	
6	1	Kimberly Hyacinthe	Canada	23.66	SB
7	4	Amandine Elard	France	23.77	
8	7	Amonn Nelson	Canada	23.99	
