= Athletics at the 2009 Summer Universiade – Women's 4 × 100 metres relay =

The women's 4 × 100 metres relay event at the 2009 Summer Universiade was held on 11–12 July.

== Medalists ==
Gold	Silver	Bronze
Italy; Audrey Alloh; Doris Tomasini; Giulia Arcioni; Maria Aurora Salvagno	Poland; Ewelina Ptak; Marika Popowicz; Dorota Jędrusińska; Marta Jeschke; Iwona Brzezińska*	France; Laetitia Denis; Ayodelé Ikuesan; Amandine Elard; Lucienne M'belu

* Athletes who competed in heats only and received medals.

== Results ==
=== Heats ===
Qualification: First 3 teams of each heat (Q) plus the next 2 fastest (q) qualified for the final.

Rank	Heat	Nation	Athletes	Time	Notes
1	1	Italy	Audrey Alloh, Doris Tomasini, Giulia Arcioni, Maria Aurora Salvagno	44.19	Q
2	2	Poland	Ewelina Ptak, Marika Popowicz, Dorota Jędrusińska, Iwona Brzezińska	44.46	Q
3	1	Thailand	Jintara Seangdee, Sangwan Jaksunin, Jutamass Tawoncharoen, Nongnuch Sanrat	44.70	Q
4	2	Lithuania	Silva Pesackaitė, Lina Andrijauskaitė, Sonata Tamošaitytė, Lina Grinčikaitė	44.73	Q, SB
5	1	Russia	Ekaterina Voronenkova, Olga Pervyakova, Ekaterina Tatarintseva, Yuna Mekhti-Zade	44.89	Q
6	1	South Africa	Thandiwe Vilakazi, Isabel Le Roux, Catharine Horn, Cindy Stewart	44.91	q
7	2	France	Laetitia Denis, Ayodelé Ikuesan, Amandine Elard, Lucienne M'Belu	44.95	Q
8	1	Hungary	Anna Breier, Éva Kaptur, Edina Pál, Zsófia Rózsa	45.29	q, SB
9	2	Slovenia	Marina Tomić, Tina Murn, Sabina Veit, Pia Tajnikar	45.61	
	2	Ghana	Lilian Frempomah Kyei, Salamatu Musa, Boahemaa Charity Ofori, Anna Animah Yeboah	DQ	
	1	China		DNS	
	1	Senegal		DNS	
	2	Serbia		DNS	

=== Final ===
Rank	Lane	Nation	Athletes	Time	Notes
1st place, gold medalist(s)	4	Italy	Audrey Alloh, Doris Tomasini, Giulia Arcioni, Maria Aurora Salvagno	43.83	
2nd place, silver medalist(s)	5	Poland	Ewelina Ptak, Marika Popowicz, Dorota Jędrusińska, Marta Jeschke	43.96	
3rd place, bronze medalist(s)	8	France	Laetitia Denis, Ayodelé Ikuesan, Amandine Elard, Lucienne M'Belu	44.31	
4	3	Thailand	Jintara Seangdee, Sangwan Jaksunin, Jutamass Tawoncharoen, Nongnuch Sanrat	44.47	
5	6	Lithuania	Silva Pesackaitė, Lina Andrijauskaitė, Sonata Tamošaitytė, Lina Grinčikaitė	44.48	SB
6	7	Russia	Ekaterina Voronenkova, Olga Pervyakova, Ekaterina Tatarintseva, Yuna Mekhti-Zade	44.94	
7	1	South Africa	Thandiwe Vilakazi, Isabel Le Roux, Catharine Horn, Cindy Stewart	45.01	
8	2	Hungary	Anna Breier, Éva Kaptur, Edina Pál, Zsófia Rózsa	46.20	
