= Athletics at the 2007 Summer Universiade – Women's 200 metres =

The women's 200 metres event at the 2007 Summer Universiade was held on 12–13 August.

== Medalists ==
Gold	Silver	Bronze
Iryna Shtanhyeyeva; Ukraine	Kadi-Ann Thomas; Great Britain	Hanna Mariën; Belgium

== Results ==
=== Heats ===
Qualification: First 4 of each heat (Q) and the next 4 fastest (q) qualified for the quarterfinals.

Wind:
Heat 1: -0.6 m/s, Heat 2: +1.3 m/s, Heat 3: +0.6 m/s, Heat 4: -2.4 m/s, Heat 5: +0.1 m/s, Heat 6: -0.2 m/s, Heat 7: -1.8 m/s

Rank	Heat	Name	Nationality	Time	Notes
1	3	Iryna Shtanhyeyeva	Ukraine	23.61	Q
2	2	Kadi-Ann Thomas	Great Britain	23.81	Q
3	5	Halyna Tonkovyd	Ukraine	23.87	Q
4	7	Kseniya Vdovina	Russia	24.05	Q
5	7	Monique Williams	New Zealand	24.08	Q
6	3	Jutamass Tawoncharoen	Thailand	24.11	Q
7	3	Sabina Veit	Slovenia	24.20	Q
8	3	Chiara Gervasi	Italy	24.21	Q, SB
9	6	Hanna Mariën	Belgium	24.24	Q
10	2	Giulia Arcioni	Italy	24.27	Q
11	7	Andriana Ferra	Greece	24.39	Q
12	5	Justine Bayigga	Uganda	24.42	Q
13	6	Amandine Elard	France	24.50	Q
14	2	Anita Kozica	Latvia	24.61	Q
14	3	Saliha Özyurt	Turkey	24.61	q
16	2	Cindy Stewart	South Africa	24.62	Q
17	2	Violaine Noyat	France	24.74	q, PB
18	1	Momoko Takahashi	Japan	24.81	Q
19	1	Sari Keskitalo	Finland	24.82	Q
20	2	Yekaterina Kondratyeva	Russia	24.89	q
21	4	Anna Gavriushenko	Kazakhstan	24.91	Q
22	4	Christine Ras	South Africa	24.94	Q
23	1	Limian Kyei Frimpomaa	Ghana	24.95	Q
24	5	Yah Soucko Koïta	Mali	24.97	Q
25	4	Burcu Şentürk	Turkey	25.16	Q
26	4	Vaya Vladeva	Bulgaria	25.59	Q
26	5	Han Ling	China	25.59	Q
28	6	Edwina Judith Nanevie	Ghana	25.60	Q, SB
29	2	Chan Ho Yee	Hong Kong	25.70	q
30	5	Chuang Shu-chuan	Chinese Taipei	25.82	
31	5	Choo Amanda	Singapore	26.06	PB
32	2	Millysand De La Paz	Netherlands Antilles	26.16	
33	7	Patricia Riesco	Peru	26.20	Q
34	1	Norjannah Hafiszah Jamaludin	Malaysia	26.28	Q
35	3	Enirahs Martina	Netherlands Antilles	26.49	PB
36	7	Munguntuya Batgerel	Mongolia	26.80	
37	4	Siao Mei Ann	Singapore	27.10	
38	7	Le Thi Diep	Vietnam	27.61	
39	4	Leckat Snege	Gabon	27.79	PB
40	1	Linda Opiyo	Kenya	28.02	
41	5	Amina Khalib	Pakistan	29.56	
42	4	Ruth Litebele	Zambia	29.79	
43	3	Andrey Assane Ahmed Bahati	Comoros	30.21	
44	1	Khurshida Khatun	Bangladesh	30.30	
45	6	Sidra Syed Ali	Pakistan	36.32	Q
	1	Thaissa Presti	Brazil	DNS	
	1	Maty Salame	Senegal	DNS	
	5	Celiangeli Morales	Puerto Rico	DNS	
	6	Lina Andrijauskaitė	Lithuania	DNS	
	6	Épiphanie Uwintije	Rwanda	DNS	
	6	Zsófia Rózsa	Hungary	DNS	
	7	Dedeh Erawati	Indonesia	DNS	
	7	Zudikey Rodríguez	Mexico	DNS	

=== Quarterfinals ===
Qualification: First 4 of each heat qualified directly (Q) for the semifinals.

Wind:
Heat 1: -0.7 m/s, Heat 2: -0.6 m/s, Heat 3: -0.2 m/s, Heat 4: -0.7 m/s

Rank	Heat	Name	Nationality	Time	Notes
1	3	Iryna Shtanhyeyeva	Ukraine	23.58	Q
2	4	Kadi-Ann Thomas	Great Britain	23.67	Q
3	2	Hanna Mariën	Belgium	23.69	Q
4	3	Jutamass Tawoncharoen	Thailand	23.93	Q
5	1	Halyna Tonkovyd	Ukraine	23.95	Q
6	4	Sabina Veit	Slovenia	24.06	Q
7	2	Kseniya Vdovina	Russia	24.14	Q
7	3	Monique Williams	New Zealand	24.14	Q, FS2
9	2	Sari Keskitalo	Finland	24.19	Q
10	2	Amandine Elard	France	24.20	Q
11	1	Chiara Gervasi	Italy	24.22	Q
12	1	Justine Bayigga	Uganda	24.30	Q
13	4	Giulia Arcioni	Italy	24.33	Q
14	4	Cindy Stewart	South Africa	24.35	Q
15	3	Andriana Ferra	Greece	24.37	Q, FS1
16	1	Momoko Takahashi	Japan	24.44	Q
17	1	Christine Ras	South Africa	24.48	
18	4	Anna Gavriushenko	Kazakhstan	24.66	
19	3	Anita Kozica	Latvia	24.68	
20	2	Saliha Özyurt	Turkey	24.94	
21	4	Yekaterina Kondratyeva	Russia	25.04	
22	1	Violaine Noyat	France	25.19	
23	1	Burcu Şentürk	Turkey	25.27	
24	3	Vaya Vladeva	Bulgaria	25.55	
25	3	Chan Ho Yee	Hong Kong	25.73	
26	4	Patricia Riesco	Peru	26.16	
27	2	Norjannah Hafiszah Jamaludin	Malaysia	26.22	
28	1	Limian Kyei Frimpomaa	Ghana	26.34	
29	2	Edwina Judith Nanevie	Ghana	26.46	
	2	Sidra Syed Ali	Pakistan	DNS	
	3	Han Ling	China	DNS	
	4	Yah Soucko Koïta	Mali	DNS	

=== Semifinals ===
Qualification: First 4 of each semifinal qualified directly (Q) for the final.

Wind:
Heat 1: -1.1 m/s, Heat 2: -1.9 m/s

Rank	Heat	Name	Nationality	Time	Notes
1	1	Iryna Shtanhyeyeva	Ukraine	23.47	Q
2	1	Kadi-Ann Thomas	Great Britain	23.50	Q
3	1	Hanna Mariën	Belgium	23.58	Q
4	1	Sabina Veit	Slovenia	23.77	Q, PB, FS1
5	2	Halyna Tonkovyd	Ukraine	23.88	Q
6	2	Monique Williams	New Zealand	24.03	Q
7	2	Jutamass Tawoncharoen	Thailand	24.12	Q
8	1	Sari Keskitalo	Finland	24.22	
9	2	Chiara Gervasi	Italy	24.31	Q
10	2	Amandine Elard	France	24.36	
11	1	Justine Bayigga	Uganda	24.39	
12	2	Kseniya Vdovina	Russia	24.40	
13	2	Momoko Takahashi	Japan	24.53	
14	2	Andriana Ferra	Greece	24.56	
15	1	Giulia Arcioni	Italy	24.64	
16	1	Cindy Stewart	South Africa	24.65	

=== Final ===
Wind: -1.3 m/s

Rank	Lane	Name	Nationality	Time	Notes
1st place, gold medalist(s)	3	Iryna Shtanhyeyeva	Ukraine	22.95	
2nd place, silver medalist(s)	4	Kadi-Ann Thomas	Great Britain	23.28	PB
3rd place, bronze medalist(s)	8	Hanna Mariën	Belgium	23.48	
4	5	Halyna Tonkovyd	Ukraine	23.75	
5	1	Sabina Veit	Slovenia	23.77	
6	7	Jutamass Tawoncharoen	Thailand	23.88	SB
7	6	Monique Williams	New Zealand	24.08	
8	2	Chiara Gervasi	Italy	24.33	
