= 2007 European Athletics U23 Championships – Women's 4 × 100 metres relay =

The women's 4 x 100 metres relay event at the 2007 European Athletics U23 Championships was held in Debrecen, Hungary, at Gyulai István Atlétikai Stadion on 15 July.

== Medalists ==
| Gold | Yuna Mekhti-Zade; Kseniya Vdovina; Natalya Murinovich; Yuliya Chermoshanskaya; Russia |
| Silver | Anne-Kathrin Elbe; Verena Sailer; Mareike Peters; Anne Möllinger; Germany |
| Bronze | Paulina Siemieniako; Ewelina Klocek; Marta Jeschke; Iwona Brzezińska; Poland |

== Results ==
=== Final ===
15 July

| Rank | Nation | Competitors | Time | Notes |
|---|---|---|---|---|
| 1st place, gold medalist(s) | Russia | Yuna Mekhti-Zade; Kseniya Vdovina; Natalya Murinovich; Yuliya Chermoshanskaya | 43.67 | |
| 2nd place, silver medalist(s) | Germany | Anne-Kathrin Elbe; Verena Sailer; Mareike Peters; Anne Möllinger | 43.75 | |
| 3rd place, bronze medalist(s) | Poland | Paulina Siemieniako; Ewelina Klocek; Marta Jeschke; Iwona Brzezińska | 43.78 | |
| 4 | Italy | Chiara Gervasi; Maria Aurora Salvagno; Giulia Arcioni; Audrey Alloh | 44.08 | |
| 5 | Ukraine | Sevil Ibrahimova; Halyna Tonkovyd; Mariya Ryemyen; Olha Andreyeva | 44.21 | |
| 6 | France | Elodie Barre; Myriam Soumaré; Nelly Banco; Ayodelé Ikuesan | 44.34 | |
| 7 | Czech Republic | Iveta Mazáčová; Martina Dostálová; Pavla Hřivnová; Jitka Bartoničková | 45.18 | |
| 8 | Greece | Evaggelia Kavoura; Eleftheria Kobidou; Agni Derveni; Ekaterini Karatza | 45.26 | |

=== Heats ===
15 July
Qualified: first 2 in each heat and 4 best to the Final

==== Heat 1 ====
| Rank | Nation | Competitors | Time | Notes |
|---|---|---|---|---|
| 1 | Russia | Yuna Mekhti-Zade; Kseniya Vdovina; Natalya Murinovich; Yuliya Chermoshanskaya | 43.98 | Q |
| 2 | Italy | Chiara Gervasi; Maria Aurora Salvagno; Giulia Arcioni; Audrey Alloh | 44.08 | Q |
| 3 | France | Elodie Barre; Myriam Soumaré; Nelly Banco; Ayodelé Ikuesan | 44.12 | q |
| 4 | Ukraine | Sevil Ibrahimova; Halyna Tonkovyd; Mariya Ryemyen; Olha Andreyeva | 44.20 | q |
| 5 | Greece | Evaggelia Kavoura; Eleftheria Kobidou; Agni Derveni; Ekaterini Karatza | 44.91 | q |
| 6 | Spain | Ruth Conde; Silvia Riba; Eva Martín; Claudia Troppa | 45.58 | |
| 7 | Hungary | Zdenka Doma; Éva Kaptur; Zsóka Bartha; Zsófia Rózsa | 46.44 | |

==== Heat 2 ====
| Rank | Nation | Competitors | Time | Notes |
|---|---|---|---|---|
| 1 | Germany | Anne-Kathrin Elbe; Verena Sailer; Mareike Peters; Anne Möllinger | 43.73 | Q |
| 2 | Poland | Paulina Siemieniako; Ewelina Klocek; Marta Jeschke; Iwona Brzezińska | 44.07 | Q |
| 3 | Czech Republic | Iveta Mazáčová; Martina Dostálová; Pavla Hřivnová; Jitka Bartoničková | 44.98 | q |
| 4 | Belgium | Eline Berings; Olivia Borlée; Wendy Den Haeze; Kim Van Hertem | 44.99 | |
| 5 | Lithuania | Sonata Tamošaitytė; Lina Andrijauskaitė; Inesa Rimkevičiūtė; Lina Grinčikaitė | 45.37 | |
| 6 | Israel | Rita Pogorelov; Liat Kogon; Rotem Battat; Orly Lettos | 46.92 | |
| | Slovenia | | DNS | |

== Participation ==
According to an unofficial count, 52 athletes from 13 countries participated in the event.

- Belgium (4)
- Czech Republic (4)
- France (4)
- Germany (4)
- Greece (4)
- Hungary (4)
- Israel (4)
- Italy (4)
- Lithuania (4)
- Poland (4)
- Russia (4)
- Spain (4)
- Ukraine (4)
