= Ewelina Ptak =

Polish sprinter (born 1987)

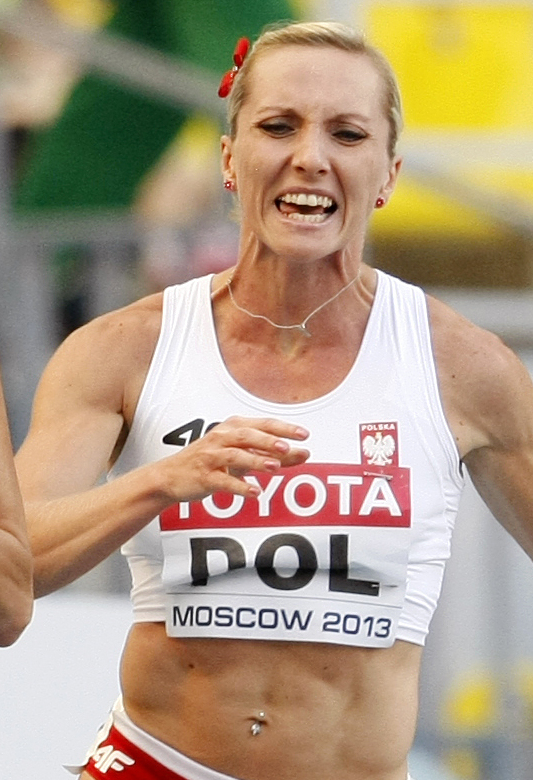

Personal information
- Born: Ewelina Klocek; 20 March 1987 (age 39) Trzebnica, Poland
- Height: 165 cm (5 ft 5 in) (2016)
- Weight: 57 kg (126 lb) (2016)

Sport
- Sport: Athletics
- Event(s): 200 metres, 4 × 100 metres relay, 4 × 400 metres relay
- Club: WKS Śląsk Wrocław
- Coached by: Józef Lisowski
Medal record
Women's athletics
Representing Poland
World Indoor Championships
| Silver medal – second place | 2016 Portland | 4 × 400 m relay |
European Championships
| Silver medal – second place | 2012 Helsinki | 4 × 100 m relay |
European Athletics U23 Championships
| Bronze medal – third place | 2009 Kaunas | 200 m |
Universiade
| Silver medal – second place | 2009 Belgrade | 4 × 100 m relay |
| Bronze medal – third place | 2013 Kazan | 4 × 100 m relay |

Ewelina Ptak (née Klocek; born 20 March 1987) is a Polish track and field sprint athlete.

Klocek represented Poland at the 2008 Summer Olympics in Beijing. She competed at the 4 × 100 metres relay together with Daria Korczyńska, Dorota Jedrusinska and Marta Jeschke. In their first round heat they placed fifth behind Belgium, Great Britain, Brazil and Nigeria. Their time of 43.47 seconds was the second best non-directly qualifying time and the seventh time overall out of sixteen participating nations. With this result they qualified for the final in which they replaced Jeschke with Joanna Henryka Kocielnik. In the final they were eventually disqualified.

She was selected to represent Poland at the 2016 Summer Olympics in the women's 4 × 400 metres relay event.

== Competition record ==
| Year | Competition | Venue | Position | Event | Notes |
Representing Poland
| 2005 | European Junior Championships | Kaunas, Lithuania | 8th | 200 m | 24.52 |
| 2006 | World Junior Championships | Beijing, China | 3rd | 200 m | 23.63 (-0.9 m/s) |
| 2006 | World Junior Championships | Beijing, China | 5th | 4 × 100 m relay | 44.70 |
| 2007 | European U23 Championships | Debrecen, Hungary | 4th | 200 m | 23.45 (-1.1 m/s) |
| 2007 | European U23 Championships | Debrecen, Hungary | 3rd | 4 × 100 m relay | 43.78 |
| 2007 | World Championships | Osaka, Japan | 23rd (qf) | 200 m | 23.26 |
| 2007 | World Championships | Osaka, Japan | 8th | 4 × 100 m relay | 43.57 |
| 2008 | Olympic Games | Beijing, China | 7th (h) | 4 × 100 m relay | 43.47 (Note: Disqualified in the final.) |
| 2009 | Universiade | Belgrade, Serbia | 2nd | 4 × 100 m relay | 43.96 |
| 2009 | European U23 Championships | Kaunas, Lithuania | 2nd | 200 m | 23.07 (-1.4 m/s) |
| 2009 | European U23 Championships | Kaunas, Lithuania | 2nd | 4 × 100 m relay | 43.90 |
| 2010 | European Championships | Barcelona, Spain | 14th (sf) | 200 m | 23.48 |
| 2012 | European Championships | Helsinki, Finland | 3rd | 4 × 100 m relay | 43.06 |
| 2012 | Olympic Games | London, United Kingdom | 9th (h) | 4 × 100 m relay | 43.07 |
| 2013 | Universiade | Kazan, Russia | 9th (sf) | 200 m | 23.65 |
| 2013 | Universiade | Kazan, Russia | 3rd | 4 × 100 m relay | 43.81 |
| 2013 | World Championships | Moscow, Russia | 11th (h) | 4 × 100 m relay | 43.18 |
| 2014 | World Indoor Championships | Sopot, Poland | 5th | 4 × 400 m relay | 3:29.89 |
| 2014 | IAAF World Relays | Nassau, Bahamas | 13th (h) | 4 × 100 m relay | 44.07 |
| 2015 | IAAF World Relays | Nassau, Bahamas | 5th | 4 × 400 m relay | 3:29.30 |
| 2016 | World Indoor Championships | Portland, United States | 2nd | 4 × 400 m relay | 3:31.15 |
| 2016 | European Championships | Amsterdam, Netherlands | 4th | 4 × 400 m relay | 3:27.60 |
