= Lina Grinčikaitė-Samuolė =

Lithuanian sprinter

Lina Grinčikaitė
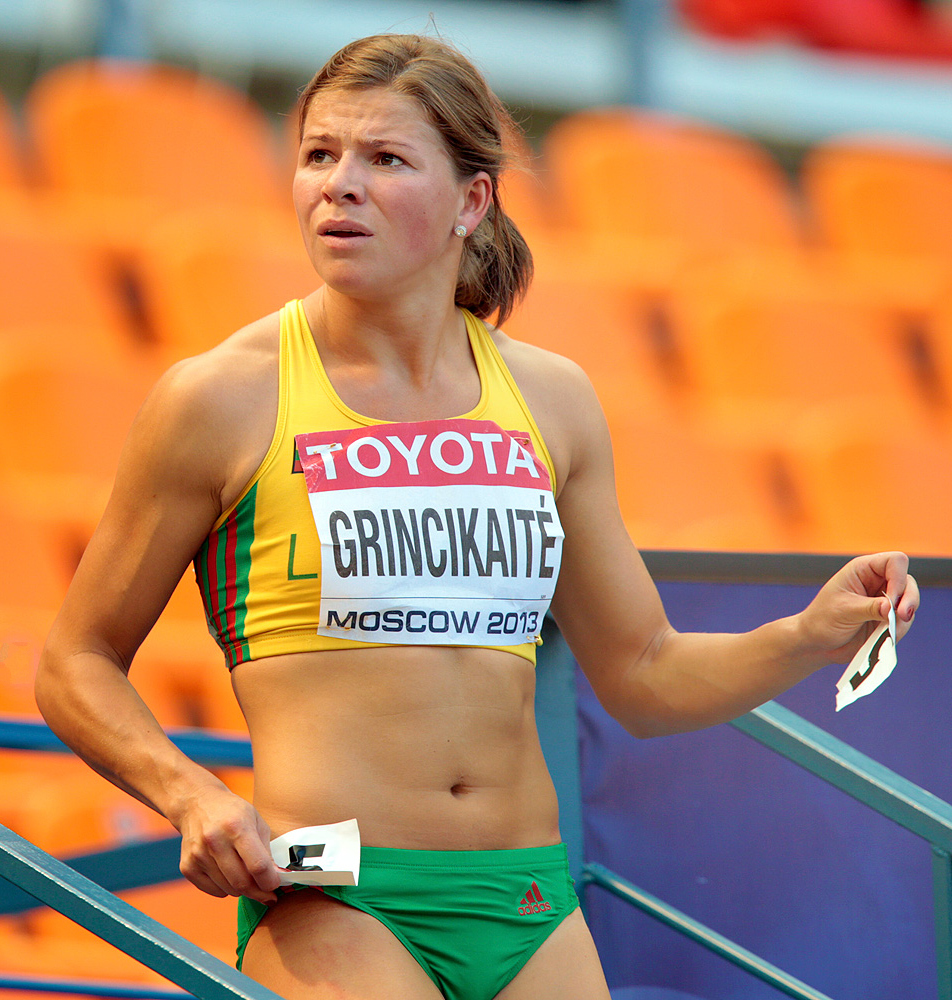
- Lina Grinčikaitė in 2013 IAAF World Championships in Athletics

Personal information
- Nationality: Lithuanian
- Born: 3 May 1987 (age 39) Klaipėda, Lithuania

Sport
- Country: Lithuania
- Sport: Track and field
- Event: Sprint

Achievements and titles
- Olympic finals: 2008: SF, 2012:SF
- Personal bests: 60m: 7.27; 100m: 11.19s NR; 200m: 23.33s; 4x100m: 43.95s NR
Medal record
Women's Athletics
Representing Lithuania
European Championships
Bronze medal – third place	2012 Helsinki	100 metres
Summer Universiade
Gold medal – first place	2009 Belgrade	100 metres
Bronze medal – third place	2011 Shenzhen	100 metres
European U23 Championships
Gold medal – first place	2009 Kaunas	100 metres
Bronze medal – third place	2009 Kaunas	4 x 100 m relay
European Junior Championships
Silver medal – second place	2005 Kaunas	100 metres

Lina Grinčikaitė-Samuolė (born 3 May 1987 in Klaipėda) is a track and field sprint athlete, who competes internationally for Lithuania.

Grinčikaitė represented Lithuania at the 2008 Summer Olympics in Beijing. She competed at the 100 metres sprint and placed third in her first round heat after Chandra Sturrup and Kelly-Ann Baptiste in a time of 11.43 seconds. She qualified for the second round, in which she improved her time to 11.33 seconds and placed second after Torri Edwards. With 11.50 seconds she placed sixth in her semi final race, which meant she was eliminated.

After finishing seventh at the 2009 European Athletics Indoor Championships, Grinčikaitė took the gold medal in the 100 m at the 2009 Summer Universiade, scoring a new personal best of 11.31 seconds in the process. She competed at the 2010 IAAF World Indoor Championships, but was eliminated in the semi-finals of the women's 60 metres.

== Personal bests ==
Event	Time (sec)	Venue	Date
60 metres	7.26	Istanbul, Turkey	11 March 2012
100 metres	11.19 NR	London, United Kingdom	3 August 2012
200 metres	23.33	Leiria, Portugal	22 June 2008

- All information taken from IAAF profile.

== Achievements ==
Year	Competition	Venue	Position	Event	Notes
Representing Lithuania
2004	World Junior Championships	Grosseto, Italy	8th (sf)	100m	11.71 (-0.1 m/s)
2005	European Indoor Championships	Madrid, Spain	16th (sf)	60 m	7.41
2005	European Junior Championships	Kaunas, Lithuania	2nd	100 m	11.69
2005	European Junior Championships	Kaunas, Lithuania	4th	200 m	23.78
2005	European Junior Championships	Kaunas, Lithuania	6th	4 × 100 m relay	45.47
2006	World Indoor Championships	Moscow, Russia	18th (sf)	60 m	7.38
2006	World Junior Championships	Beijing, China	6th	100m	11.49 (-0.8 m/s)
2006	World Junior Championships	Beijing, China	4th (h)	200m	23.84 (-1.5 m/s)
2007	European Indoor Championships	Birmingham, United Kingdom	29th (h)	60 m	7.47
2007	European U23 Championships	Debrecen, Hungary	4th	100m	11.69 (-2.0 m/s)
2007	European U23 Championships	Debrecen, Hungary	13th (sf)	200m	23.73 (-0.6 m/s)
2007	European U23 Championships	Debrecen, Hungary	10th (h)	4 × 100 m relay	45.37
2008	World Indoor Championships	Valencia, Spain	21st (sf)	60 m	7.41
2008	Olympic Games	Beijing, China	14th (sf)	100 m	11.50
2009	European Indoor Championships	Turin, Italy	7th	60 m	7.38
2009	Universiade	Belgrade, Serbia	1st	100 m	11.31
2009	Universiade	Belgrade, Serbia	5th	4 × 100 m relay	44.48
2009	European Athletics U23 Championships	Kaunas, Lithuania	1st	100 m	11.37 (+0.2 m/s)
2009	European Athletics U23 Championships	Kaunas, Lithuania	3rd	4 × 100 m relay	44.09
2010	World Indoor Championships	Doha, Qatar	13th (sf)	60 m	7.34
2010	European Championships	Barcelona, Spain	12th (sf)	100 m	11.35
2010	European Championships	Barcelona, Spain	11th (h)	4 × 100 m relay	44.13
2011	European Indoor Championships	Paris, France	9th (sf)	60 m	7.27
2011	Universiade	Shenzhen, China	3rd	100 m	11.44
2012	World Indoor Championships	Istanbul, Turkey	12th (sf)	60 m	7.26
2012	European Championships	Helsinki, Finland	3rd	100 m	11.32
2012	Olympic Games	London, United Kingdom	17th (sf)	100 m	11.30
2013	Universiade	Kazan, Russia	2nd	100 m	11.32
2014	European Championships	Zürich, Switzerland	18th (sf)	100 m	11.52
2015	European Indoor Championships	Prague, Czech Republic	25th (h)	60 m	7.41
2015	Universiade	Gwangju, South Korea	4th	100 m	11.49
2015	Universiade	Gwangju, South Korea	–	4 × 100 m relay	DNF
2016	European Championships	Amsterdam, Netherlands	20th (h)	100 m	11.77
