= 2007 European Athletics U23 Championships – Women's 100 metres =

The women's 100 metres event at the 2007 European Athletics U23 Championships was held in Debrecen, Hungary, at Gyulai István Atlétikai Stadion on 12 and 13 July.

== Medalists ==
| Gold | Verena Sailer; Germany |
| Silver | Montell Douglas; United Kingdom |
| Bronze | Myriam Soumaré; France |

== Results ==
=== Final ===
13 July
Wind: -2.0 m/s

| Rank | Name | Nationality | Time | Notes |
|---|---|---|---|---|
| 1st place, gold medalist(s) | Verena Sailer | Germany | 11.66 | |
| 2nd place, silver medalist(s) | Montell Douglas | United Kingdom | 11.66 | |
| 3rd place, bronze medalist(s) | Myriam Soumaré | France | 11.68 | |
| 4 | Lina Grinčikaitė | Lithuania | 11.69 | |
| 5 | Yuna Mekhti-Zade | Russia | 11.78 | |
| 6 | Natalya Murinovich | Russia | 11.78 | |
| 7 | Sari Keskitalo | Finland | 11.80 | |
| 8 | Maria Aurora Salvagno | Italy | 11.89 | |

=== Semifinals ===
12 July
Qualified: first 4 in each heat to the Final

==== Semifinal 1 ====
Wind: 0.8 m/s

| Rank | Name | Nationality | Time | Notes |
|---|---|---|---|---|
| 1 | Montell Douglas | United Kingdom | 11.28 | Q |
| 2 | Natalya Murinovich | Russia | 11.47 | Q |
| 3 | Myriam Soumaré | France | 11.58 | Q |
| 5 | Olivia Borlée | Belgium | 11.59 | |
| 6 | Iwona Brzezińska | Poland | 11.67 | |
| 7 | Anne Möllinger | Germany | 11.67 | |
| 8 | Chiara Gervasi | Italy | 11.73 | |

==== Semifinal 2 ====
Wind: 0.3 m/s

| Rank | Name | Nationality | Time | Notes |
|---|---|---|---|---|
| 1 | Verena Sailer | Germany | 11.37 | Q |
| 2 | Sari Keskitalo | Finland | 11.44 | Q |
| 3 | Lina Grinčikaitė | Lithuania | 11.48 | Q |
| 4 | Yuna Mekhti-Zade | Russia | 11.51 | Q |
| 5 | Lizet Assehbede | Ukraine | 11.54 | |
| 6 | Maja Golub | Croatia | 11.62 | |
| 7 | Fabienne Weyermann | Switzerland | 11.76 | |
| 8 | Natacha Vouaux | France | 11.84 | |

=== Heats ===
12 July
Qualified: first 2 in each heat and 6 best to the Semifinals

==== Heat 1 ====
Wind: 1.2 m/s

| Rank | Name | Nationality | Time | Notes |
|---|---|---|---|---|
| 1 | Natalya Murinovich | Russia | 11.48 | Q |
| 2 | Iwona Brzezińska | Poland | 11.62 | Q |
| 3 | Mariya Ryemyen | Ukraine | 11.78 | |
| 4 | Pia Tajnikar | Slovenia | 11.78 | |
| 5 | Silvia Riba | Spain | 11.87 | |
| 6 | Charlene Attard | Malta | 12.21 | |

==== Heat 2 ====
Wind: 1.7 m/s

| Rank | Name | Nationality | Time | Notes |
|---|---|---|---|---|
| 1 | Lizet Assehbede | Ukraine | 11.51 | Q |
| 2 | Maria Aurora Salvagno | Italy | 11.57 | Q |
| 3 | Maja Golub | Croatia | 11.72 | q |
| 4 | Natacha Vouaux | France | 11.76 | q |
| 5 | Giorgia Candiani | Switzerland | 11.86 | |
| 5 | Eleftheria Kobidou | Greece | 11.86 | |

==== Heat 3 ====
Wind: 1.0 m/s

| Rank | Name | Nationality | Time | Notes |
|---|---|---|---|---|
| 1 | Lina Grinčikaitė | Lithuania | 11.52 | Q |
| 2 | Yuna Mekhti-Zade | Russia | 11.52 | Q |
| 3 | Fabienne Weyermann | Switzerland | 11.72 | q |
| 3 | Anne Möllinger | Germany | 11.73 | q |
| 5 | Rita Pogorelov | Israel | 11.85 | |
| 6 | Zsófia Rózsa | Hungary | 12.14 | |

==== Heat 4 ====
Wind: 1.8 m/s

| Rank | Name | Nationality | Time | Notes |
|---|---|---|---|---|
| 1 | Verena Sailer | Germany | 11.31 | Q |
| 2 | Myriam Soumaré | France | 11.50 | Q |
| 3 | Olivia Borlée | Belgium | 11.56 | q |
| 4 | Chiara Gervasi | Italy | 11.75 | q |
| 5 | Iveta Mazáčová | Czech Republic | 11.79 | |
| 6 | Ruth Conde | Spain | 12.01 | |
| 7 | Hanna Platitsyna | Ukraine | 12.14 | |

==== Heat 5 ====
Wind: 0.6 m/s

| Rank | Name | Nationality | Time | Notes |
|---|---|---|---|---|
| 1 | Montell Douglas | United Kingdom | 11.41 | Q |
| 2 | Sari Keskitalo | Finland | 11.61 | Q |
| 3 | Sónia Tavares | Portugal | 11.77 | |
| 4 | Katja Börner | Germany | 11.80 | |
| 5 | Audrey Alloh | Italy | 11.86 | |
| 6 | Paulina Siemieniako | Poland | 11.87 | |

== Participation ==
According to an unofficial count, 31 athletes from 20 countries participated in the event.

- Belgium (1)
- Croatia (1)
- Czech Republic (1)
- Finland (1)
- France (2)
- Germany (3)
- Greece (1)
- Hungary (1)
- Israel (1)
- Italy (3)
- Lithuania (1)
- Malta (1)
- Poland (2)
- Portugal (1)
- Russia (2)
- Slovenia (1)
- Spain (2)
- Switzerland (2)
- Ukraine (3)
- United Kingdom (1)
