= 2006 European Athletics Championships – Women's 200 metres =

Women's 200 metres at the 2006 European Athletics Championships
- Venue: Ullevi Stadium
- Location: Gothenburg, Sweden
- Dates: 10 August (heats); 11 August (semi-finals & final)
- Competitors: 28 from 19 nations
- Winning time: 22.68

Medalists
gold medal	Kim Gevaert	Belgium
silver medal	Yuliya Gushchina	Russia
bronze medal	Natalia Rusakova	Russia

These are the results of the women's 200 metres event at the 2006 European Athletics Championships in Gothenburg, Sweden.

== Medalists ==
Gold	Silver	Bronze
Kim Gevaert; Belgium	Yuliya Gushchina; Russia	Natalia Rusakova; Russia

== Schedule ==
Date	Time	Round
10 August 2006	18:25	Round 1
11 August 2006	18:45	Semifinals
11 August 2006	20:45	Final

== Records ==
World Record	Florence Griffith-Joyner (USA)	21.34	Seoul, South Korea (SO)	29 September 1988
European Record	Marita Koch (GDR)	21.71	Karl Marx Stadt, East Germany	10 June 1979
European Record	Heike Drechsler (GDR)	21.71	Stuttgart, West Germany	28 August 1986
Championship Record	Heike Drechsler (GDR)	21.71	Stuttgart, West Germany	28 August 1986

No records were broken during this event.

== Results ==
KEY:	q	Fastest non-qualifiers	Q	Qualified	NR	National record	PB	Personal best	SB	Seasonal best

=== Round 1 ===
Qualification: First 3 in each heat (Q) and the next 4 fastest (q) advance to the semifinals.

Rank	Heat	Name	Nationality	Time	Notes
1	4	Yuliya Gushchina	Russia	22.69	Q, SB
2	2	Natalia Rusakova	Russia	22.75	Q
3	4	Kim Gevaert	Belgium	22.83	Q
4	1	Monika Bejnar	Poland	23.07	Q
5	3	Angela Moroșanu	Romania	23.14	Q
6	3	Hanna Mariën	Belgium	23.24	Q
7	4	Muriel Hurtis-Houairi	France	23.27	Q, SB
8	1	Jacqueline Poelman	Netherlands	23.35	Q
9	4	Jala Gangnus	Germany	23.39	q
10	1	Yekaterina Kondratyeva	Russia	23.41	Q
10	2	Olena Chebanu	Ukraine	23.41	Q
12	2	Olivia Borlée	Belgium	23.48	Q
13	2	Sylviane Félix	France	23.50	q
14	1	Eleni Artymata	Cyprus	23.51	q, PB
15	2	Klodiana Shala	Albania	23.55	q, NR
16	2	Sari Keskitalo	Finland	23.55	PB
17	2	Elisabeth Slettum	Norway	23.55	PB
18	3	Belén Recio	Spain	23.62	Q
19	1	Kristina Žumer	Slovenia	23.63	SB
20	1	Štěpánka Klapáčová	Czech Republic	23.64	
21	1	Eleftheria Kobidou	Greece	23.92	
22	3	Lena Aruhn	Sweden	23.94	
22	4	Anna Boyle	Ireland	23.94	
24	4	Pia Tajnikar	Slovenia	24.22	
25	4	Iveta Mazáčová	Czech Republic	24.25	
26	3	Monika Gachevska	Bulgaria	24.53	
	3	Ciara Sheehy	Ireland	DNF	
	3	Fabienne Beret-Martinel	France	DQ	

=== Semifinals ===
First 4 of each Semifinal will be directly qualified (Q) for the Final.

==== Semifinal 1 ====
Rank	Lane	Name	Nationality	React	Time	Notes
1	4	Kim Gevaert	Belgium	0.154	23.07	Q
2	3	Yuliya Gushchina	Russia	0.162	23.21	Q
3	5	Angela Moroșanu	Romania	0.222	23.60	Q
4	6	Olena Chebanu	Ukraine	0.174	23.79	Q
5	2	Muriel Hurtis-Houairi	France	0.161	23.80	
6	8	Belén Recio	Spain	0.255	24.20	
7	1	Jala Gangnus	Germany	0.193	24.24	
8	7	Klodiana Shala	Albania	0.245	24.64	

==== Semifinal 2 ====
Rank	Lane	Name	Nationality	React	Time	Notes
1	5	Natalia Rusakova	Russia	0.180	23.02	Q
2	8	Yekaterina Kondratyeva	Russia	0.218	23.32	Q
3	4	Monika Bejnar	Poland	0.143	23.34	Q
4	7	Sylviane Félix	France	0.181	23.46	Q
5	6	Hanna Mariën	Belgium	0.192	23.59	
6	2	Olivia Borlée	Belgium	0.156	23.90	
7	1	Eleni Artymata	Cyprus	0.179	23.93	
8	3	Jacqueline Poelman	Netherlands	0.150	24.01	

=== Final ===
Rank	Lane	Name	Nationality	React	Time	Notes
1st place, gold medalist(s)	5	Kim Gevaert	Belgium	0.149	22.68	
2nd place, silver medalist(s)	4	Yuliya Gushchina	Russia	0.161	22.93	
3rd place, bronze medalist(s)	3	Natalia Rusakova	Russia	0.165	23.09	
4	7	Monika Bejnar	Poland	0.162	23.28	
5	8	Sylviane Félix	France	0.216	23.45	
6	6	Yekaterina Kondratyeva	Russia	0.162	23.58	
7	2	Olena Chebanu	Ukraine	0.175	23.63	
8	1	Angela Moroșanu	Romania	0.230	23.66	
