= Monique Williams =

Monique Williams may refer to:

- Monique Williams (athlete) (born 1985), New Zealand sprinter
- Monique Williams (actress) (born 1992), Australian actress
