= Kseniya Ryzhova =

Russian sprinter

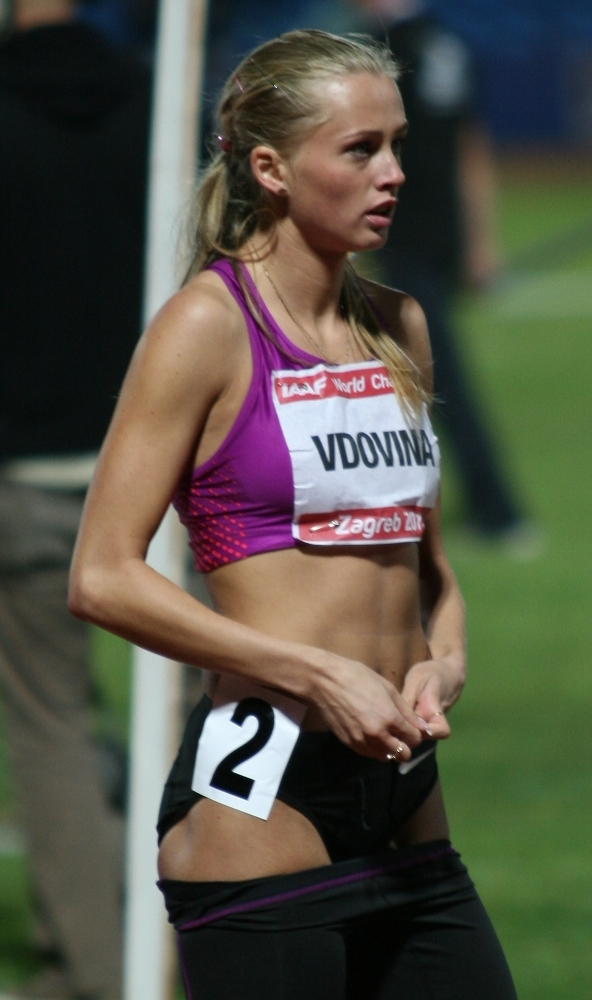
- Ryzhova in Zagreb in 2010

Medal record

Women's athletics

Representing Russia

World Championships
Disqualified	2013 Moscow	4 × 400 m relay

World Indoor Championships
Disqualified	2010 Doha	4 × 400 m relay

European Indoor Championships
Gold medal – first place	2011 Paris	4 × 400 m relay

Kseniya Olegovna Ryzhova, née Vdovina (Russian: Ксения Олеговна Рыжова; born April 19, 1987) is a Russian track and field sprint athlete, originally from Lipetsk. She was the 2013 World Champion in 4 × 400 m relay (running the third leg).

On March 7, 2014, at the 2014 World Indoor Championships, Ryzhova was tested for illegal substances, and the test subsequently revealed trimetazidine. She was disqualified for nine months.

== Competition record ==
Year	Competition	Venue	Position	Event	Notes
Representing Russia
2006	World Junior Championships	Beijing, China	19th (sf)	200 m	24.68 (wind: -2.8 m/s)
2006	World Junior Championships	Beijing, China	7th (h)	4 × 100 m relay	44.92
2007	European U23 Championships	Debrecen, Hungary	14th (sf)	200 m	23.80 (wind: -0.6 m/s)
2007	European U23 Championships	Debrecen, Hungary	1st	4 × 100 m relay	43.67
2007	Universiade	Bangkok, Thailand	12th (sf)	200 m	24.40
2007	Universiade	Bangkok, Thailand	4th	4 × 100 m relay	44.16
2009	European U23 Championships	Kaunas, Lithuania	1st	4 × 400 m relay	3:27.59
2010	World Indoor Championships	Doha, Qatar	DSQ (2nd)	4 × 400 m relay	DSQ (3:27.44)
2011	European Indoor Championships	Paris, France	1st	4 × 400 m relay	3:29.34
2011	World Championships	Daegu, South Korea	1st (h)	4 × 400 m relay	3:20.94
2013	World Championships	Moscow, Russia	7th	400 m	50.98
2013	World Championships	Moscow, Russia	DSQ (1st)	4 × 400 m relay	DSQ (3:20.19)
2014	World Indoor Championships	Sopot, Poland	DSQ (4th)	4 × 400 m relay	DSQ (3:28.39)
2015	World Championships	Beijing, China	—	4 × 100 m relay	DNF
2015	World Championships	Beijing, China	4th	4 × 400 m relay	3:24.84

== 2013 Moscow kiss ==
During the medal ceremony for the women's 4 × 400 metres relay images of Kseniya Ryzhova and Yuliya Gushchina (Note: Several sources misidentified the pictures of Gushchina as fellow relay medallist Tatyana Firova.) sharing a kiss on the lips spread through social media and were interpreted as a protest against the anti-gay laws. Both Ryzhova and Gushchina denied any intention to make such a protest, rather they were simply happy with their athletic success, and stated that they were married to men. Although reports were principally focused on the pair, all four of the Russia relay runners briefly kissed each other on the podium. Ryzhova described her assumed connection to LGBT as insulting. The Russian Minister for Sport, Vitaly Mutko, said that Western media had over-emphasised the issue, noting that same-sex relations are not illegal in Russia and sparser coverage of the issue in domestic media.
