= Vincenza Calì =

Italian sprinter (born 1983)

Personal information
- Born: 15 October 1983 (age 42) Palermo, Italy
- Height: 1.74 m (5 ft 8 1/2 in)
- Weight: 63 kg (139 lb)

Sport
- Country: Italy
- Sport: Athletics
- Event: Sprint
- Club: G.S. Fiamme Azzurre

Achievements and titles
- Personal bests: 100 m: 11.35 (2008); 200 m: 22.98 (2008)
Medal record
Mediterranean Games
Silver medal – second place	2009 Pescara	4 × 100 metres relay
European Cup
Bronze medal – third place	2005 Florence	4 × 100 metres relay
Bronze medal – third place	2008 Annecy	4 × 100 metres relay
European Athletics U23 Championships
Bronze medal – third place	2005 Erfurt	200 metres
Bronze medal – third place	2005 Erfurt	4 × 100 metres relay

Vincenza Calì (born 15 October 1983) is an Italian former track and field sprint athlete.

She won three medals at the senior level with the national relay team at the International athletics competitions.

== Biography ==
She represented Italy at the 2008 Summer Olympics in Beijing. She competed at the 4 × 100 metres relay together with Anita Pistone, Giulia Arcioni, and Audrey Alloh. In their first-round heat they were disqualified and eliminated from the final. She won two medals at the Mediterranean Games in Pescara. She has 11 caps in national team from 2001 to 2008.

She was engaged to the Italy national football team goalkeeper, Gianluigi Buffon.

== National records ==
- 4 × 100 metres relay: 43.04 ( (France) Annecy, 21 June 2008) - with Anita Pistone, Giulia Arcioni, Audrey Alloh - current holder

== National titles ==
Calì has won the individual national championship 7 times.

- 2 wins in the 100 metres (2004, 2005)
- 2 wins in the 200 metres (2004, 2005, 2008)
- 1 win in the indoor 60 metres (2008)

== See also ==
- Italy national relay team
- Italian all-time lists - 100 metres
- Italian all-time lists - 200 metres
- Italian all-time lists - 4 × 100 metres relay
