= Iveta Mazáčová =

Czech sprinter

Personal information
- Full name: Iveta Mazáčová
- Born: 15 December 1986 (age 39) Czechoslovakia

Sport
- Country: Czech Republic
- Sport: Athletics
- Event(s): 100 metres, 200 metres

Achievements and titles
- Regional finals: 25th at the 2006 European Athletics Championships
- Personal bests: 60 m: 7.37 (Prague; 19 February 2011); 100 m: 11.72 (Prague; 13 June 2011); 200 m: 23.73 (Prague; 25 June 2006)

Iveta Mazáčová (born 15 December 1986) is a Czech athlete who specialises in the sprint disciplines 60 m, 100 m and 200 metres.

At the 2006 European Athletics Championships, Mazáčová finished seventh in her 200 m heat for a 25th place overall result.

In 2011, for the third year in succession, Mazáčová won the gold medal at the Czech Indoor Championships in the 60 metres, securing a personal best time of 7.37 seconds.

== Achievements ==
Year	Competition	Venue	Position	Event	Notes
Representing Czech Republic
2006	Czech Athletics Championships	Prague, Czech Republic	2nd	100 m	11.86
2006	Czech Athletics Championships	Prague, Czech Republic	2nd	200 m	23.73, PB
2006	European Championships	Gothenburg, Sweden	25th	200 m	24.25
2006	European Championships	Gothenburg, Sweden	—	4 × 100 m relay	DSQ
2007	Czech Indoor Championships	Prague, Czech Republic	3rd	60 m	7.48
2007	Czech Indoor Championships	Prague, Czech Republic	3rd	200 m	24.23
2007	Czech Athletics Championships	Třinec, Czech Republic	3rd	100 m	12.03
2007	European U23 Championships	Debrecen, Hungary	20th (h)	100m	11.79 (wind: 1.8 m/s)
2007	European U23 Championships	Debrecen, Hungary	7th	4 × 100 m relay	45.18
2008	Czech Indoor Championships	Prague, Czech Republic	2nd	60 m	7.48
2008	Czech Athletics Championships	Tábor, Czech Republic	4th	100 m	11.84
2008	Czech Athletics Championships	Tábor, Czech Republic	5th	200 m	24.45
2009	Czech Indoor Championships	Prague, Czech Republic	1st	60 m	7.41
2009	Czech Indoor Championships	Prague, Czech Republic	3rd	200 m	24.63
2009	Czech Athletics Championships	Prague, Czech Republic	4th	100 m	11.99
2009	Czech Athletics Championships	Prague, Czech Republic	4th	200 m	24.83
2010	Czech Indoor Championships	Prague, Czech Republic	1st	60 m	7.38
2010	Czech Athletics Championships	Třinec, Czech Republic	2nd	100 m	11.83
2010	Czech Athletics Championships	Třinec, Czech Republic	3rd	200 m	24.73
2011	Czech Indoor Championships	Prague, Czech Republic	1st	60 m	7.37, PB
2011	Czech Athletics Championships	Brno, Czech Republic	2nd	100 m	11.47 ^{[w]}
2011	Czech Athletics Championships	Brno, Czech Republic	4th	200 m	24.29
2012	Czech Indoor Championships	Prague, Czech Republic	2nd	60 m	7.39
2012	Czech Indoor Championships	Prague, Czech Republic	2nd	200 m	24.54
2012	Czech Athletics Championships	Vyškov, Czech Republic	3rd	100 m	11.78
2012	Czech Athletics Championships	Vyškov, Czech Republic	7th	200 m	24.85

- ^{w} : Wind assisted
