= 2009 European Athletics U23 Championships – Women's 200 metres =

The women's 200 metres event at the 2009 European Athletics U23 Championships was held in Kaunas, Lithuania, at S. Dariaus ir S. Girėno stadionas (Darius and Girėnas Stadium) on 18 July.

== Medalists ==
Gold	Aleksandra Fedoriva; Russia
Silver	Ewelina Ptak; Poland
Bronze	Marika Popowicz; Poland

== Results ==
=== Final ===
18 July
Wind: -1.4 m/s

Rank	Name	Nationality	Time	Notes
1st place, gold medalist(s)	Aleksandra Fedoriva	Russia	22.97	
2nd place, silver medalist(s)	Ewelina Ptak	Poland	23.07	
3rd place, bronze medalist(s)	Marika Popowicz	Poland	23.25	
4	Alena Kievich	Belarus	23.31	
5	Johanna Danois	France	23.38	
6	Weronika Wedler	Poland	23.66	
7	Nataliya Pohrebnyak	Ukraine	23.81	
8	Lucy Sargent	United Kingdom	23.96	

=== Heats ===
18 July
Qualified: first 2 in each heat and 2 best to the Final

==== Heat 1 ====
Wind: 1.2 m/s

Rank	Name	Nationality	Time	Notes
1	Aleksandra Fedoriva	Russia	23.34	Q
2	Weronika Wedler	Poland	23.48	Q
3	Nataliya Pohrebnyak	Ukraine	23.52	q
4	Joey Duck	United Kingdom	23.77	
5	Wendy Pascal	France	23.83	
6	Michaela D'Angelo	Italy	24.36	
7	Monika Táborská	Czech Republic	24.65	

==== Heat 2 ====
Wind: 1.1 m/s

Rank	Name	Nationality	Time	Notes
1	Marika Popowicz	Poland	23.15	Q
2	Alena Kievich	Belarus	23.15	Q
3	Lucy Sargent	United Kingdom	23.57	q
4	Yelizaveta Savlinis	Russia	23.85	
5	Kadene Vassell	Netherlands	23.95	
6	Joellie Baflan	France	24.07	
7	Louise Kiernan	Ireland	24.27	
8	Martina Pretelli	San Marino	26.43	

==== Heat 3 ====
Wind: 0.6 m/s

Rank	Name	Nationality	Time	Notes
1	Johanna Danois	France	23.14	Q
2	Ewelina Ptak	Poland	23.22	Q
3	Tina Jureš	Slovenia	23.70	
4	Estela García	Spain	24.08	
5	Anamaria Ioniță	Romania	24.16	
6	Katsiaryna Hanchar	Belarus	24.29	
	Yekaterina Yefimova	Russia	DNF	
	Ezinne Okparaebo	Norway	DNS	

== Participation ==
According to an unofficial count, 22 athletes from 14 countries participated in the event.

- Belarus (2)
- Czech Republic (1)
- France (3)
- Ireland (1)
- Italy (1)
- Netherlands (1)
- Poland (3)
- Romania (1)
- Russia (3)
- San Marino (1)
- Slovenia (1)
- Spain (1)
- Ukraine (1)
- United Kingdom (2)
