= Elisabeth Slettum =

Norwegian athlete (born 1986)

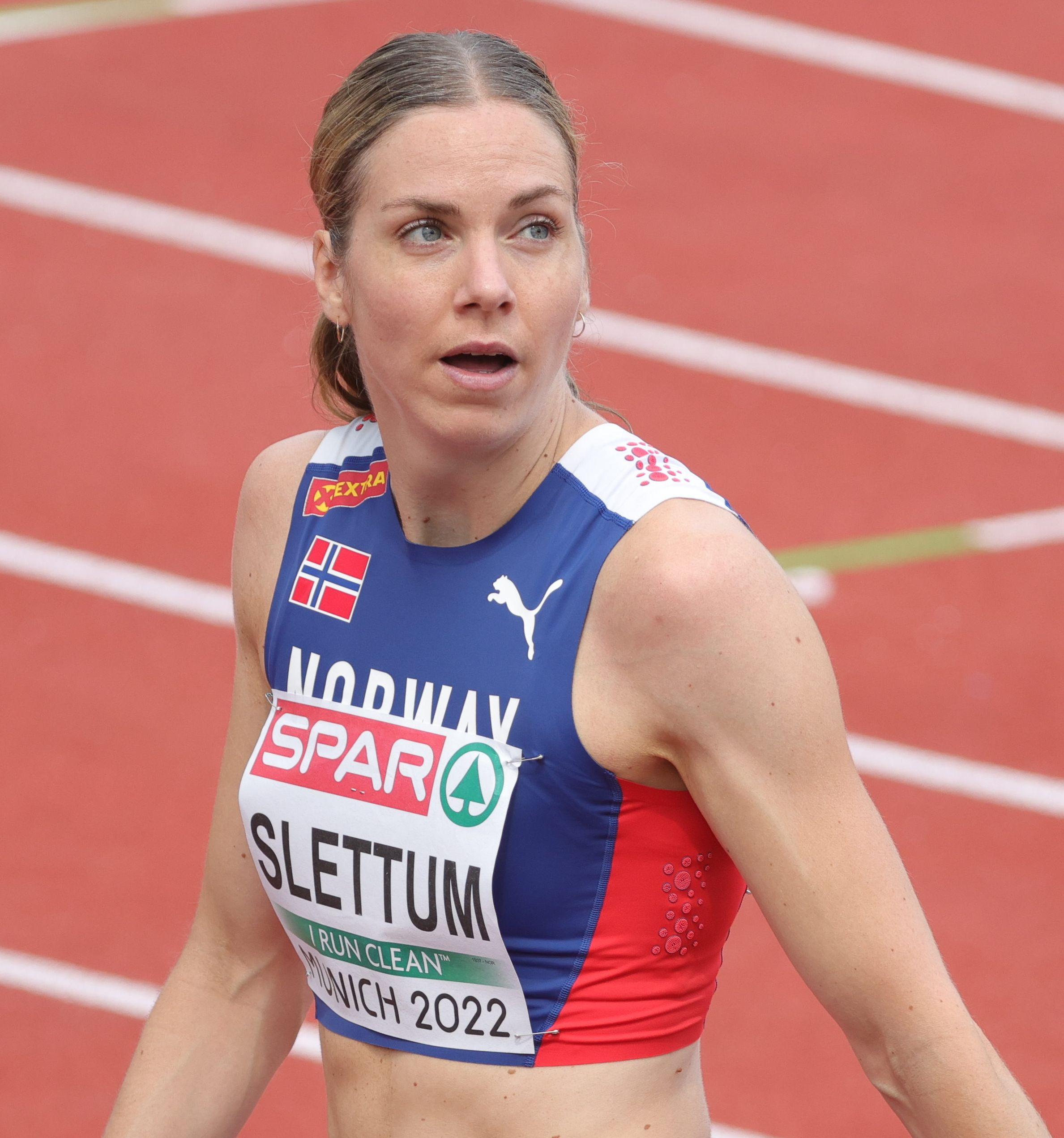
- Slettum at the 2022 European Championships

Personal information
- Born: 31 August 1986 (age 39)
- Height: 1.87 m (6 ft 2 in)

Sport
- Country: Norway
- Sport: Athletics
- Events: 200 metres, 400 metres hurdles

Elisabeth Slettum (born 31 August 1986) is a Norwegian athlete who specialized in the 200 metres, later the 400 metres hurdles.

Individually she finished sixth at the 2003 European Youth Olympic Festival. She competed at the 2004 World Junior Championships, the 2005 European Indoor Championships, the 2005 European Junior Championships, the 2006 European Championships, the 2007 European U23 Championships and the 2014 European Championships without reaching the final.

At the Norwegian championships she won gold in 2005–2009 and 2014–2015, and also took four silver medals and one bronze. In the 100 metres she has six silver medals and one bronze medal. She represents the club IL Skjalg.

Her personal best times are 11.73 in the 100 metres, achieved in August 2013 at Bislett stadion and 23.48 in the 200 metres, achieved at the 2007 European U23 Championships in Debrecen. Indoors she notably ran the 200 metres in 23.66 seconds in February 2004 in Stange, a national indoor record for more than a decade.

In the 4 x 100 metres relay she finished fifth at the 2003 European Youth Olympic Festival and was a Norwegian team mainstay at numerous European Cups and Team Championships. She helped breaking the Norwegian record with 44.35 seconds at the 2008 edition, together with Siri Eritsland, Folake Akinyemi and Ezinne Okparaebo. Slettum helped improve it to 44.29 seconds at the 2014 European Championships with Isabelle Pedersen, Christine Bjelland Jensen and Ezinne Okparaebo; then to 43.94 seconds at the 2015 European Team Championships Super League with Isabelle Pedersen, Ida Bakke Hansen and Ezinne Okparaebo.

After Amalie Iuel relocated to Norway in 2017, Slettum, Iuel and Karsten Warholm formed a group training under Leif Olav Alnes. Slettum had switched event to the low hurdles. In 2018 she ran personal best times of 54.35 seconds without hurdles and 57.51 seconds with hurdles, both at Bislett stadion. Her hurdling result was 0.01 seconds shy of qualification mark for the 2018 European Championships.
