= Anita Pistone =

Italian sprinter

Personal information
- Full name: Anita Sebastiana Pistone
- Nationality: Italian
- Born: 29 October 1976 (age 49) Catania, Italy
- Height: 1.65 m (5 ft 5 in)
- Weight: 55 kg (121 lb)

Sport
- Country: Italy
- Sport: Athletics
- Event: Sprint
- Club: G.S. Fiamme Gialle

Achievements and titles
- Personal bests: 100 m: 11.27 (2008); 200 m hs: 23.76 (2007)
Medal record
Event	1st	2nd	3rd
Mediterranean Games	0	2	0
European Cup	0	0	1
Total	0	2	1

Anita Pistone (born 29 October 1976) is a track and field sprint athlete who competes internationally for Italy.

== Biography ==
Pistone represented Italy at the 2008 Summer Olympics in Beijing. She competed at the 100 metres sprint and placed second in her first round heat after Muna Lee in a time of 11.43. She qualified for the second round in which she failed to qualify for the semi-finals as her time of 11.56 was the sixth time of her race. Together with Vincenza Calì, Giulia Arcioni and Audrey Alloh she also took part in the 4 × 100 metres relay. In their first round heat they were however disqualified and eliminated for the final.

== National records ==
- 4 × 100 metres relay: 43.04 ( (France) Annecy, 21 June 2008) - with Audrey Alloh, Giulia Arcioni, Vincenza Calì - current holder

== Achievements ==
Year	Competition	Venue	Position	Event	Time	Notes
2001	Mediterranean Games	(Tunisia) Tunis	2nd	4 × 100 m relay	44.89	
2008	European Cup	(France) Annecy	3rd	4 × 100 m relay	43.04	
2009	Mediterranean Games	(Italy) Pescara	2nd	4 × 100 m relay	43.86	

== See also ==
- Italy national relay team
- Italian all-time lists - 4 × 100 metres relay
