= Audrey Alloh =

Italian sprinter (born 1987)

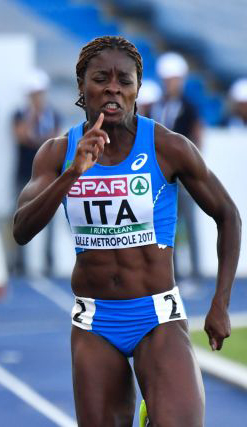

Personal information
- Nationality: Italian
- Born: 21 July 1987 (age 39) Abidjan, Ivory Coast

Sport
- Country: Italy
- Sport: Athletics
- Event: Sprint
- Club: G.S. Fiamme Azzurre

Achievements and titles
- Personal bests: 60 m indoor: 7.24 (2015); 100 m: 11.37 (2017); 200 m: 24.06 (2012)
Medal record
Event	1st	2nd	3rd
Summer Universiade	1	0	0
Mediterranean Games	1	0	0
European Cup	0	0	1

Batafoé N’Gnoron Jeanne Audrey Larissa Alloh (born 21 July 1987) is a sprinter who competes internationally for Italy.

== Biography ==
Alloh represented Italy at the 2008 Summer Olympics in Beijing. She competed at the 4 × 100 metres relay together with Anita Pistone, Giulia Arcioni and Vincenza Calì. In their first round heat they were however disqualified and eliminated for the final.

== National records ==
- 4 × 100 metres relay: 43.04 ( (France) Annecy, 21 June 2008) – with Anita Pistone, Giulia Arcioni, Vincenza Calì – current holder

== Achievements ==
Year	Competition	Venue	Position	Event	Notes
Representing Italy
2006	World Junior Championships	Beijing, China	14th (h)	4 × 100 m relay	45.57
2007	European U23 Championships	Debrecen, Hungary	23rd (h)	100m	11.86 (wind: 0.6 m/s)
2007	European U23 Championships	Debrecen, Hungary	4th	4 × 100 m relay	44.08
2007	Universiade	Bangkok, Thailand	23rd (qf)	100 m	12.02
2007	Universiade	Bangkok, Thailand	5th	4 × 100 m relay	44.71
2008	European Cup	Annecy, France	3rd	4 × 100 m relay	43.04
2008	Olympic Games	Beijing, China	– (h)	4 × 100 m relay	DQ
2009	Universiade	Belgrade, Serbia	13th (sf)	100 m	11.82
2009	Universiade	Belgrade, Serbia	1st	4 × 100 m relay	43.83
2009	European U23 Championships	Kaunas, Lithuania	12th (sf)	100m	11.83 (wind: -0.5 m/s)
2009	European U23 Championships	Kaunas, Lithuania	7th	4 × 100 m relay	45.40
2010	European Championships	Barcelona, Spain	12th (h)	4 × 100 m relay	44.15
2012	World Indoor Championships	Istanbul, Turkey	20th (sf)	60 m	7.38
2012	European Championships	Helsinki, Finland	13th (sf)	100 m	11.51
2012	European Championships	Helsinki, Finland	10th (h)	4 × 100 m relay	43.90
2013	Mediterranean Games	Mersin, Turkey	1st	4 × 100 m relay	44.66
2013	Universiade	Kazan, Russia	8th	100 m	11.62
2014	World Indoor Championships	Sopot, Poland	24th (h)	60 m	7.35
2014	European Championships	Zürich, Switzerland	14th (sf)	100 m	11.45
2014	European Championships	Zürich, Switzerland	4th	4 × 100 m relay	43.26
2015	European Indoor Championships	Prague, Czech Republic	9th (sf)	60 m	7.24
2017	IAAF World Relays	Nassau, Bahamas	–	4 × 100 m relay	DQ
2018	European Championships	Berlin, Germany	7th	4 × 100 m relay	43.42

== National titles ==
She has won 5 times the individual national championship.

- 1 win in the 100 metres (2012)
- 4 wins in the 60 metres indoor (2012, 2013, 2014, 2015)

== See also ==
- Italian records in athletics
- Italian all-time lists – 100 metres
- Italian all-time lists – 4 × 100 metres relay
- Italy national relay team
