= Isabel Le Roux =

English sprinter

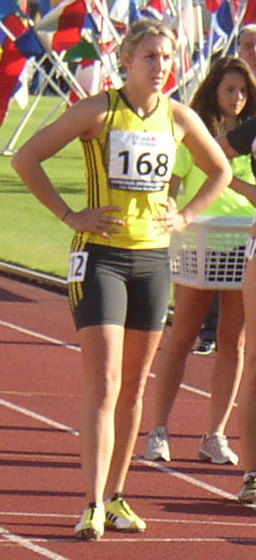
- Isabel Le Roux at the 2010 Josef Odložil Memorial in Prague

Medal record

Women's athletics

Representing South Africa

African Championships
| Gold medal – first place | 2008 Addis Ababa | 200 m |
| Bronze medal – third place | 2008 Addis Ababa | 4×100 m |

Isabel Le Roux (born 23 January 1987) is a South African sprinter who specializes in the 200 metres.

At the 2008 African Championships she won the 200 metres race in a personal best time of 22.69 seconds. She also won a bronze medal in 4 × 100 metres relay.

In the 100 metres her personal best time is 1 seconds, achieved in April 2004 in Bloemfontein.

== Achievements ==
| Year | Competition | Venue | Position | Event | Notes |
Representing South Africa
| 2004 | World Junior Championships | Grosseto, Italy | 34th (h) | 100 m | 12.13 (wind: +0.3 m/s) |
| 2004 | World Junior Championships | Grosseto, Italy | 19th (sf) | 200 m | 24.60 (wind: +0.7 m/s) |
| 2004 | World Junior Championships | Grosseto, Italy | 10th (h) | 4 × 100 m relay | 45.30 |
| 2008 | African Championships | Addis Ababa | 1st | 200 m | 22.69 |
| 2008 | African Championships | Addis Ababa | 3rd | 4 × 100 m relay | 44.28 |
| 2008 | Olympic Games | Beijing, China | 36th (h) | 200 m | 23.67 |
| 2009 | Universiade | Belgrade, Serbia | 2nd | 200 m | 23.18 |
| 2009 | Universiade | Belgrade, Serbia | 7th | 4 × 100 m relay | 45.01 |
| 2009 | World Championships | Berlin, Germany | 32nd (h) | 200 m | 23.61 |
