= Leif Olav Alnes =

Norwegian athletics coach

Leif Olav Alnes (born 29 January 1957) is a Norwegian athletics coach.

He originally hails from Torvikbukt. He did his military service at Haakonsvern in Bergen. When moving to Oslo to study at the Norwegian School of Sport Sciences, whence he graduated in biomechanics, he became a coach in IK Tjalve.

Having coached many athletes, Alnes is best known as the coach of Fernando Ramírez and Geir Moen and later Karsten Warholm, in a training group also consisting of Amalie Iuel and Elisabeth Slettum.
