= Marta Jeschke =

Polish sprinter (born 1986)

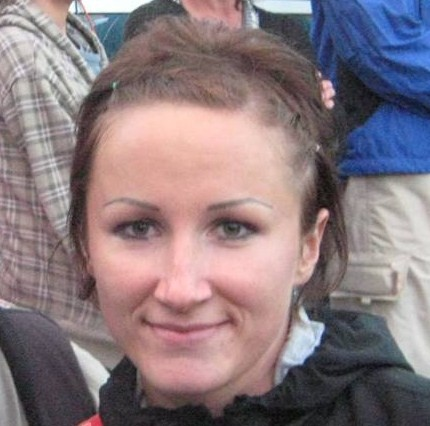
- Marta Jeschke in 2010

Personal information
- Nationality: Poland
- Born: 2 June 1986 (age 40) Wejherowo, Poland
- Height: 1.64 m (5 ft 4 1/2 in)
- Weight: 58 kg (128 lb) (2012)

Sport
- Sport: Athletics
- Event(s): 100 m, 200 m
- Club: SKLA Sopot
Medal record
Women's athletics
Representing Poland
European Championships
Bronze medal – third place	2010 Barcelona	4 × 100 m relay
Bronze medal – third place	2012 Helsinki	4 × 100 m relay
European Team Championships
Silver medal – second place	2009 Leiria	200 m
Universiade
Silver medal – second place	2009 Belgrade	4 × 100 m relay

Marta Jeschke (born 2 June 1986 in Wejherowo) is a Polish sprinter who specializes in the 200 metres. Her personal best time is 23.19 seconds, achieved in June 2008 in Rostock. She has best of 11.33 seconds in the 100 metres, which she set in Kraków in 2011.

Jeschke represented Poland at the 2008 Summer Olympics in Beijing. In the 200 m she did not qualify from her heat. She competed in the 4 × 100 metres relay together with Daria Korczyńska, Dorota Jędrusińska and Ewelina Klocek. In their first round heat they placed fifth behind Belgium, Great Britain, Brazil and Nigeria. Their time of 43.47 seconds was the second best non-directly qualifying time and the seventh time overall out of sixteen participating nations. With this result they qualified for the final in which they replaced Jeschke with Joanna Henryka Kocielnik. In the final they were eventually disqualified. She won the bronze medal with the Polish 4 × 100 metres relay at the 2010 European Athletics Championships.

She again represented Poland at the 2012 Summer Olympics, this time in the 100 m and the 4 × 100 metres.

== Competition record ==
Year	Competition	Venue	Position	Event	Notes
Representing Poland
2004	World Junior Championships	Grosseto, Italy	17th (sf)	200 m	24.51 (wind: +0.7 m/s)
2004	World Junior Championships	Grosseto, Italy	7th	4 × 100 m relay	45.34
2005	European Junior Championships	Kaunas, Lithuania	5th	100 m	11.86
2005	European Junior Championships	Kaunas, Lithuania	13th (sf)	200 m	24.63
2005	European Junior Championships	Kaunas, Lithuania	1st	4 × 100 m relay	44.65
2007	European U23 Championships	Debrecen, Hungary	3rd	200 m	23.42 (wind: -1.1 m/s)
2007	European U23 Championships	Debrecen, Hungary	3rd	4 × 100 m relay	43.78
2007	World Championships	Osaka, Japan	8th	4 × 100 m relay	43.57
2008	Olympic Games	Beijing, China	33rd (h)	200 m	23.59
2008	Olympic Games	Beijing, China	7th (h)	4 × 100 m relay	43.47
2009	Universiade	Belgrade, Serbia	5th	200 m	23.65
2009	Universiade	Belgrade, Serbia	2nd	4 × 100 m relay	43.96
2009	World Championships	Berlin, Germany	9th (h)	4 × 100 m relay	43.63
2010	European Championships	Barcelona, Spain	12th (sf)	200 m	23.36
2010	European Championships	Barcelona, Spain	3rd	4 × 100 m relay	42.68 (NR)
2011	World Championships	Daegu, South Korea	38th (h)	100 m	11.72
2011	World Championships	Daegu, South Korea	–	4 × 100 m relay	DNF
2012	European Championships	Helsinki, Finland	3rd	4 × 100 m relay	43.06
2013	World Championships	Moscow, Russia	11th (h)	4 × 100 m relay	43.18
2014	World Indoor Championships	Sopot, Poland	24th (sf)	60 m	7.41
2015	World Championships	Beijing, China	11th (h)	4 × 100 m relay	43.20
