= Giulia Arcioni =

Italian sprinter (born 1986)

Personal information
- Born: 21 March 1986 (age 40) Rome, Italy
- Height: 1.71 m (5 ft 7 1/2 in)
- Weight: 55 kg (121 lb)

Sport
- Country: Italy
- Sport: Athletics
- Event: Sprint
- Club: G.S. Fiamme Azzurre

Achievements and titles
- Personal bests: 100 m: 11.58 (2010); 200 m: 23.40 (2010)
Medal record
Summer Universiade
Gold medal – first place	2009 Belgrade	4 × 100 metres relay
Mediterranean Games
Silver medal – second place	2009 Pescara	4 × 100 metres relay
European Cup
Bronze medal – third place	2008 Annecy	4 × 100 metres relay

Giulia Arcioni (born 21 March 1986 in Rome) is a track and field sprint athlete who competes internationally for Italy.

== Biography ==
Arcioni represented Italy at the 2008 Summer Olympics in Beijing. She competed at the 4 × 100 metres relay together with Anita Pistone, Vincenza Calì and Audrey Alloh. In their first round heat they were however disqualified and eliminated for the final. She won two medals, to senior level, with the national relay team at the International athletics competitions.

== National records ==
- 4 × 100 metres relay: 43.04 ( (France) Annecy, 21 June 2008) - with Anita Pistone, Audrey Alloh, Vincenza Calì - current holder

== Achievements ==
Year	Competition	Venue	Position	Event	Notes
Representing Italy
2004	World Junior Championships	Grosseto, Italy	32nd (h)	200 m	24.75 (wind: +1.2 m/s)
2004	World Junior Championships	Grosseto, Italy	6th	4 × 100 m relay	45.19
2007	European U23 Championships	Debrecen, Hungary	20th (h)	200 m	24.16 (wind: 0.3 m/s)
2007	European U23 Championships	Debrecen, Hungary	4th	4 × 100 m relay	44.08
2007	Universiade	Bangkok, Thailand	15th (sf)	200 m	24.64
2007	Universiade	Bangkok, Thailand	5th	4 × 100 m relay	44.71
2008	European Cup	Annecy, France	3rd	4 × 100 m relay	43.04 (NR)
2008	Olympic Games	Beijing, China	–	4 × 100 m relay	DQ
2009	Mediterranean Games	Pescara, Italy	5th	200 m	23.89
2009	Mediterranean Games	Pescara, Italy	2nd	4 × 100 m relay	43.86
2009	Universiade	Belgrade, Serbia	1st	4 × 100 m relay	43.83
2010	European Championships	Barcelona, Spain	15th (sf)	200 m	23.77
2010	European Championships	Barcelona, Spain	12th (h)	4 × 100 m relay	44.15
2011	European Indoor Championships	Paris, France	4th	4 × 400 m relay	3:33.70 (NR)

== See also ==
- Italy national relay team
- Italian all-time lists - 4 × 100 metres relay
