= Monique Williams (athlete) =

New Zealand sprinter

Personal information
- Born: 23 September 1985 (age 40) Tokoroa, New Zealand

Sport
- Country: New Zealand
- Sport: Athletics
Medal record
Women's Athletics
Representing New Zealand
Oceania Championships
Gold medal – first place	2006 Apia	200 m
Gold medal – first place	2006 Apia	400 m
Gold medal – first place	2006 Apia	800 m medley relay (Mixed)
Bronze medal – third place	2006 Apia	4x100 m relay
Summer Universiade
Gold medal – first place	2009 Belgrade	200 m

Monique Williams (born 23 September 1985) is a New Zealand sprinter from Tokoroa.

Williams became the first New Zealand female sprinter to win a gold medal at a major world championship event, when she won the 200 m at the World University Games (Universiade) in Belgrade during 2009.

In doing so she became only the second Kiwi sprinter to win gold at a world event, after Don Jowett won the 220 yards at the 1954 British Empire and Commonwealth Games.

Williams was selected as the flag Bearer for New Zealand at the 2009 Universiade.

During her development years, in 2006 she was awarded a New Zealand Prime Minister's Scholarship from Helen Clark, recognising Williams as an emerging and talented New Zealander. Williams won three consecutive New Zealand Athletics titles in the 100, 200 and 400 m in 2007, 2008 and 2009.

Williams broke the New Zealand national record for 200 m which had stood for almost 31 years, when she ran 22.98 in February 2009. She then ran 22.96 in the heats of the IAAF 2009 World Championships in Athletics in Berlin, before running 22.90s in the final, a record which lasted until 19 February 2023.

In 2009 Williams was named Auckland's North Shore Sports Personality of the Year and was short-listed for the Halberg Awards.

Williams graduated from Waikato University with a Bachelor of Education in primary school teaching and is a qualified primary school teacher.

== Achievements ==
Year	Competition	Venue	Position	Event	Notes
Representing New Zealand
2000	World Junior Championships	Santiago, Chile	8th	4 × 400 m relay	3:49.87
2004	World Junior Championships	Grosseto, Italy	24th (h)	200m	24.43 (wind: +0.5 m/s)
2004	World Junior Championships	Grosseto, Italy	14th (sf)	400m	56.13
2006	Oceania Championships	Apia, Samoa	1st	200 m	23.72 s (wind: +0.8 m/s)
2006	Oceania Championships	Apia, Samoa	1st	400 m	55.21 s
2006	Oceania Championships	Apia, Samoa	3rd	4 × 100 m relay	48.94 s
2006	Oceania Championships	Apia, Samoa	1st	Mixed 800 m medley relay	1:35.62 min
2007	Universiade	Bangkok, Thailand	7th	200 m	24.08
2009	Universiade	Belgrade, Serbia	1st	200 m	23.11
2009	World Championships	Berlin, Germany	12th (sf)	200 m	22.90
2010	Commonwealth Games	Delhi, India	6th	200 m	23.71

== Personal bests ==
Distance	Time	Place	Date
100 m	11.64	Wellington, New Zealand	27 March 2009
200 m	22.90 NR	Berlin, Germany	20 August 2009
400 m	51.88	Brisbane, Australia	20 March 2009
800 m	2:09.09	Debrecen, Hungary	12 July 2010
