= Zudikey Rodríguez =

Mexican sprinter and hurdler

Personal information
- Full name: Zudikey Rodríguez Núñez
- Born: 14 March 1987 (age 39) Valle de Bravo, State of Mexico, Mexico
- Height: fjrfh to dh1.68 m (5 ft 6 in)
- Weight: 56 kg (123 lb)
- Spouse: Patricio Araujo (m. 2020)

Sport
- Country: Mexico
- Sport: Athletics
- Event(s): Sprint and Hurdling
Medal record
Representing Mexico
Pan American Games
Silver medal – second place	2007 Rio de Janeiro	4x400m relay
Central American and Caribbean Games
Gold medal – first place	2014 Xalapa	400m hurdles
Silver medal – second place	2014 Xalapa	4x400m relay
Silver medal – second place	2018 Barranquilla	4x400m relay
- Updated on 3 January 2015

Zudikey Rodríguez Núñez (born 14 March 1987 in Valle de Bravo, State of Mexico) is a Mexican sprinter and hurdler. Her personal best time for the 200 metres is 23.18 seconds, achieved in May 2007 in Puebla.

Then she moved up a distance to run 400 metres. She was member of the silver medal-winning Mexican 4×400 relay team at the 2007 Pan American Games. She also placed eighth in the 2007 World Championships in Athletics and represented Mexico at the 2008 Summer Olympics.

In 2010, she switched to the 400 metres hurdles event. In her first competitive race, she set a Mexican record of 56.10 seconds (previous record was 57.78 by Mayra González). She went on to become the hurdles champion at the 2010 Ibero-American Championships in Athletics.

During the 2010 Central American and Caribbean Games where she won the silver in the 400 meters hurdles and bronze in the 4 x 400 meters relay, she tested positive for a banned substance, methylhexanamine, commonly used as nasal decongestant, she was consequently suspended for six months from 3 August 2010 to 4 February 2011.

== Personal bests ==
Event	Result	Venue	Competition	Date
Outdoor
100 m	11.67 s (wind: +1.1 m/s)	(Mexico) Monterrey	National University Games	30 Apr 2007
200 m	23.18 s (wind: NWI)	(Mexico) Puebla	Olimpiada Nacional	27 May 2007
400 m	51.75 s	(Mexico) San José del Cabo	National Championships	25 Jun 2010
400 m hurdles	55.11 s	Colombia	XXIII Central American and Caribbean Games	31 Jul 2018

== International competitions ==
Year	Competition	Venue	Position	Event	Notes
Representing Mexico
2004	Central American and Caribbean; Junior Championships (U-20)	Coatzacoalcos, Mexico	6th	200 m	24.65 (wind: 2.7 m/s)
2004	Central American and Caribbean; Junior Championships (U-20)	Coatzacoalcos, Mexico	3rd	4 × 100 m relay	47.86
2004	World Junior Championships	Grosseto, Italy	37th (h)	100 m	12.19 (wind: -0.7 m/s)
2004	World Junior Championships	Grosseto, Italy	34th (h)	200 m	24.99 (wind: +1.3 m/s)
2004	World Junior Championships	Grosseto, Italy	—	4 × 100 m relay	DQ
2007	Pan American Games	Rio de Janeiro, Brazil	2nd	4 × 400 m relay	3:27.75 (NR)
2007	Universiade	Bangkok, Thailand	8th (sf)	400 m	53.16
2007	World Championships	Osaka, Japan	32nd (qf)		24.31 (wind: +0.7 m/s)
2007	World Championships	Osaka, Japan	8th	4 × 400 m relay	3:29.14
2008	Ibero-American Championships	Iquique, Chile	1st	400m	52.14
2008	Ibero-American Championships	Iquique, Chile	1st	4 × 400 m relay	3:33.27
2008	Central American and Caribbean Championships	Cali, Colombia	8th	400 m	52.95 A
2008	Central American and Caribbean Championships	Cali, Colombia	2nd	4 × 400 m relay	3:29.94
2008	Olympic Games	Beijing, China	14th (h)	4 × 400 m relay	3:30.36
2010	Ibero-American Championships	San Fernando, Spain	1st	400 m hurdles	56.33 s
2010	Ibero-American Championships	San Fernando, Spain	2nd	4 × 400 m relay	3:32.96
2010	Central American and Caribbean Games	Mayagüez, Puerto Rico	—	400 m hurdles	DQ^{1}
2010	Central American and Caribbean Games	Mayagüez, Puerto Rico	—	4 × 400 m relay	DQ^{1}
2011	Pan American Games	Guadalajara, Mexico	5th	4 × 400 m relay	3:40.07 A
2013	Central American and Caribbean Championships	Morelia, Mexico	3rd	400m hurdles	58.12 A
2013	Central American and Caribbean Championships	Morelia, Mexico	2nd	4 × 400 m relay	3:34.52 A
2014	Ibero-American Championships	São Paulo, Brazil	1st	400m hurdles	56.64
2014	Pan American Sports Festival	Mexico City, Mexico	1st	400 m hurdles	55.78 A
2014	Central American and Caribbean Games	Xalapa, Mexico	1st	400 m hurdles	56.79 A
2014	Central American and Caribbean Games	Xalapa, Mexico	2nd	4 × 400 m relay	3:33.16 A
2015	NACAC Championships	San José, Costa Rica	7th	400m hurdles	56.64
2018	Central American and Caribbean Games	Barranquilla, Colombia	2nd	400 m hurdles	55.11(NR)

^{1}: Doping.
