= Kelly-Ann Baptiste =

Trinidad and Tobago sprinter

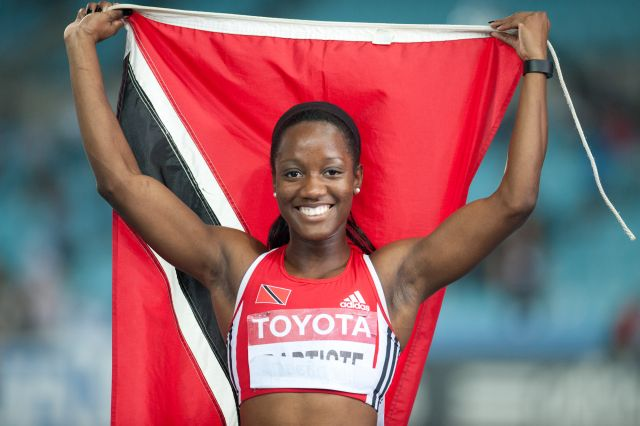

Personal information
- Nationality: Trinidad and Tobago
- Born: 14 October 1986 (age 40) Plymouth, Trinidad and Tobago
- Height: 1.67 m (5 ft 6 in)
- Weight: 54 kg (119 lb)

Sport
- Sport: Track and field
- Events: 100 metres, 200 metres, 4 × 100 m relay
Medal record
Women's athletics
Representing Trinidad and Tobago
World Championships
Bronze medal – third place	2011 Daegu	100 m
Bronze medal – third place	2015 Beijing	4 × 100 m relay
Representing Americas
Continental Cup
Gold medal – first place	2010 Split	100 m
Gold medal – first place	2010 Split	4 × 100 m relay

Kelly-Ann Kaylene Baptiste (born 14 October 1986) is a Trinidad and Tobago track and field sprint athlete.

== Junior ==
Competing at the international level for the first time, Kelly-Ann bowed out in the semi-finals of the World Junior Championships in Athletics. She ran 12.03 seconds to end seventh in her heat at the National Stadium in Kingston, Jamaica.

In 2003, Kelly-Ann was the first Trinidad and Tobago female sprinter to win a medal in a global track meet when she ran 11.58 seconds to take bronze in the 100 m at the 3rd IAAF World Youth Championships in Sherbrooke, Canada. Less than a year later, she took 200 m gold and 100 m silver at the XVI Central American and Caribbean (CAC) Junior Track & Field Championships, in Veracruz, Mexico. She followed that up with fourth place in the 200 m final at the 10th IAAF World Junior Championships, in Grosseto, running 23.46 and missing out on bronze by one-thousandth of a second.

Kelly-Ann completed a busy year by making her Olympic debut in Athens, running the lead-off leg in the 4 × 100 m relay, but she was unable to complete the baton exchange with Fana Ashby, and T&T exited the event in the first round.

In 2005, Kelly-Ann ran 11.39 and 23.35 to win the 100 m and 200 m races at the CARIFTA Games on her home island of Tobago. She then competed at the 10th IAAF World Championships in Athletics in Helsinki, Finland, and reached the quarter-finals of the 100 m, where she ran 11.42 to finish sixth.

== College ==
In 2005, Kelly-Ann began her track career at Trinidad and Tobago's national events before moving on to Louisiana State University. In her freshman season, sandwiched between CARIFTA and World Championships, she made the finals of three events at the NCAA Outdoor Track & Field Championships, finishing fourth in the 100 m (11.37), eighth in the 200 m (23.42) and anchoring the Lady Tigers to fifth in the 4 × 100-m relay.

She would end her collegiate career in 2008 as a 14-time All-American (having made that number of NCAA event finals), a six-time NCAA Mideast Regional Champion and a two-time NCAA champion. Her two titles came in her senior season, as she became the first Lady Tiger to sweep 60 m and 100 m titles at the NCAA Championships in the same season. She scored a team-high 19 points at the 2008 NCAA Outdoor Track and Field Championships to lead the Lady Tigers to their first national championship since 2004 and their 25th NCAA team title.

Those accomplishments earned Kelly-Ann recognition as Southeastern Conference Female Runner of the Year for the Indoor and Outdoor seasons, and US Track and Field and Cross Country Coaches Association South Central Region Female Track Athlete of the Year.

Kelly-Ann returned to major international competition when she represented Trinidad and Tobago at the 2008 Summer Olympics in Beijing. She competed at the 100 m and placed second in her first round heat after Chandra Sturrup in a time of 11.39. She qualified for the second round in which she failed to qualify for the semi-finals as her time of 11.42 was the sixth time of her race. Together with Wanda Hutson, Ayanna Hutchinson and Semoy Hackett she also took part in the 4 × 100 metres relay. In their first round heat they did not finish and once again Trinidad and Tobago was eliminated due to a mistake with the baton exchange.

== Professional ==
In May 2009, at the Grande Prêmio Brasil Caixa in May 2009, Kelly-Ann set a Trinidad and Tobago national record in the 200 metres finishing with a time of 22.60 seconds. Later that year, she would go on to make the semifinals of the 100 and 200 at the 10th IAAF World Championships in Athletics, finishing fifth (11.04 seconds) and 4th (22.96) respectively. She was also invited to the IAAF/VTB Bank World Athletics Final, where she ran 11.27 to finish 8th in the 100.

Despite the absence of major meets in 2010, Kelly-Ann had a stellar competitive year. She began training in Florida with 2007 triple world champion Tyson Gay, 2001 World 200 m gold medallist Debbie Ferguson Mc Kenzie and 2004 Olympic and 2009 World 4 × 100 champion Aileen Bailey, under coach Lance Brauman. Although she had had success in the collegiate ranks under head track and field coach Dennis Shaver, the change of environment brought the desired results.

In June, the Trinidadian star achieved the then-best performance of the year in the women's 100, doing 10.84 at the National Training Centre (NTC) Stars Invitational meet, in Clermont, Florida, making her the 27th-fastest woman over that distance all-time. She had a good run at the inaugural Samsung Diamond League, ending third in her event on points. Kelly-Ann then achieved perhaps her most significant victory to date, winning the 100 at the first-ever IAAF / VTB Continental Cup. Her time of 11.05 was the fourth-fastest winning time in the history of that meet.

Kelly-Ann then joined American Shalonda Solomon (who was second in the individual 100), Cydonie Mothersill of the Cayman Islands and Debbie Ferguson-McKenzie of the Bahamas to win the women's 4 × 100 relay for the Americas in a time of 43.07. 2011 ISTAF IAAF World Challenge meet, in Berlin, German 100 m Winner.

At the 2012 Summer Olympics, she competed in the 100 m, finishing in 6th, and the 4 × 100 m, where Trinidad and Tobago reached the final but did not finish as Michelle-Lee Ahye did not complete the baton exchange to Baptiste.

At the 2017 World Athletics Championships, she competed in the 100 m qualifying for the final in a time of 11.07.

== Doping ban ==
Baptiste failed a doping test in April 2013; the test result was announced in August just ahead of the 2013 World Championships in Athletics in Moscow, which she had been scheduled to compete in. Baptiste received a two-year ban from the IAAF, though Trinidadian authorities argued for a shorter ban on the grounds that she fully co-operated with anti-doping investigators; her case was compared to that of her training partner Tyson Gay, who had also co-operated with authorities after a failed test and received a reduced ban of only one year. The Court of Arbitration for Sport eventually cleared Baptiste to compete in January 2015; the effective duration of her ban was 21 months, backdating to 24 April 2013. Baptiste's results from competitions between the backdated start of the ban and August 2013 (when the failed test was announced and she was first suspended from competing) were all annulled in accordance with IAAF rules; her national records of 10.83 (100 m) and 22.36 (200 m) from the June 2013 national championships were wiped out.

== Personal bests ==
Event	Time (seconds)	Venue	Date
55 metres	6.73	Gainesville, United States	26 February 2006
60 metres	7.13	Fayetteville, United States	2 March 2008
100 metres	10.84 (Note: Baptiste ran times of 10.83 (+1.6) for 100 metres and 22.36 (+0.3) for 200 metres at the 2013 national championships in Port of Spain, but they were subsequently annulled due to a failed doping test.)	Clermont, United States	5 June 2010
100 metres	10.84	Port of Spain, Trinidad and Tobago	27 June 2015
200 metres	22.60	Belém, Brazil	24 May 2009

== 100 m progression ==
Time (seconds)	Venue	Date
11.78	Port of Spain (TRI)	14 April 2002
11.48 +0.5	Bridgetown (BAR)	9 June 2003
11.40 0.0	Szombathely (HUN)	8 August 2004
11.17 +0.6	Port of Spain (TRI)	25 June 2005
11.08 +1.4	Fayetteville (USA)	14 May 2006
11.22 +1.3	Baton Rouge (USA)	24 March 2007
11.06 +1.9	Austin (USA)	5 April 2008
10.94 +1.7	Port of Spain (TRI)	19 June 2009
10.84 +1.8	Clermont (USA)	5 June 2010
10.83 +1.6	Port of Spain (TRI)	22 June 2013
10.84 +1.4	Port of Spain (TRI)	27 June 2015

== International competitions ==
Year	Competition	Venue	Position	Event	Notes
Representing Trinidad and Tobago
2001	CARIFTA Games (U-17)	Bridgetown, Barbados	6th	100 m	12.39 (0.0 m/s)
2001	CARIFTA Games (U-17)	Bridgetown, Barbados	5th	200 m	25.27 (−4.0 m/s)
2002	CARIFTA Games (U-17)	Nassau, Bahamas	3rd	100 m	12.05 (0.6 m/s)
2002	Central American and Caribbean; Junior Championships (U-17)	Bridgetown, Barbados	6th	100 m	12.36 (0.0 m/s)
2002	Central American and Caribbean; Junior Championships (U-17)	Bridgetown, Barbados	2nd	200 m	24.82 (−1.0 m/s)
2002	World Junior Championships	Kingston, Jamaica	20th (sf)	100 m	12.03 (0.7 m/s)
2003	CARIFTA Games (U-20)	Port of Spain, Trinidad and Tobago	5th	100 m	11.77 w (3.8 m/s)
2003	CARIFTA Games (U-20)	Port of Spain, Trinidad and Tobago	5th	200 m	24.31 (−3.0 m/s)
2003	CARIFTA Games (U-20)	Port of Spain, Trinidad and Tobago	2nd	4 × 100 m relay	45.09
2003	World Youth Championships	Sherbrooke, Canada	3rd	100 m	11.58 (1.8 m/s)
2003	Pan American Junior Championships	Bridgetown, Barbados	3rd	4 × 100 m relay	
2004	CARIFTA Games (U-20)	Hamilton, Bermuda	3rd	100 m	11.94 (−1.7 m/s)
2004	CARIFTA Games (U-20)	Hamilton, Bermuda	3rd	200 m	23.86 (1.1 m/s)
2004	CARIFTA Games (U-20)	Hamilton, Bermuda	2nd	4 × 100 m relay	46.09
2004	Central American and Caribbean; Junior Championships (U-20)	Coatzacoalcos, Mexico	2nd	100 m	11.50 (0.6 m/s)
2004	Central American and Caribbean; Junior Championships (U-20)	Coatzacoalcos, Mexico	1st	200 m	23.37 w (2.7 m/s)
2004	Central American and Caribbean; Junior Championships (U-20)	Coatzacoalcos, Mexico	2nd	4 × 100 m relay	45.10
2004	World Junior Championships	Grosseto, Italy	4th	200 m	23.46 (wind: -0.2 m/s)
2004	World Junior Championships	Grosseto, Italy	4th	4 × 100 m relay	44.14
2005	CARIFTA Games (U-20)	Bacolet, Trinidad and Tobago	1st	100 m	11.39 (0.9 m/s)
2005	CARIFTA Games (U-20)	Bacolet, Trinidad and Tobago	1st	200 m	23.25 (0.1 m/s)
2005	CARIFTA Games (U-20)	Bacolet, Trinidad and Tobago	2nd	4 × 100 m relay	44.76
2005	World Championships	Helsinki, Finland	6th (qf)	100 m	11.42 (−0.1 m/s)
2008	Olympic Games	Beijing, China	6th (qf)	100 m	11.42 (0.1 m/s)
2009	World Championships	Berlin, Germany	5th (sf)	100 m	11.07 (−0.1 m/s)
2009	World Championships	Berlin, Germany	4th (sf)	200 m	22.96 (0.5 m/s)
2011	World Championships	Daegu, South Korea	3rd	100 m	10.98 (−1.4 m/s)
2015	World Championships	Beijing, China	6th	100 m	11.01
2015	World Championships	Beijing, China	3rd	4 × 100 m relay	42.03
2017	World Championships	London, United Kingdom	8th	100 m	11.09
2017	World Championships	London, United Kingdom	6th	4 × 100 m relay	42.62
2019	Pan American Games	Lima, Peru	8th	100 m	11.52
2019	Pan American Games	Lima, Peru	4th	4 × 100 m relay	43.57
2019	World Championships	Doha, Qatar	12th (sf)	100 m	11.19
2019	World Championships	Doha, Qatar	6th	4 × 100 m relay	42.71
2021	Olympic Games	Tokyo, Japan	39th (h)	100 m	11.48
2021	Olympic Games	Tokyo, Japan	15th (h)	4 × 100 m relay	43.62

== Notes ==
Olympic Games
Preceded by Keshorn Walcott	Flagbearer for Trinidad and Tobago; Tokyo 2020	Succeeded by Incumbent
