= Joanna Kocielnik =

Polish sprinter

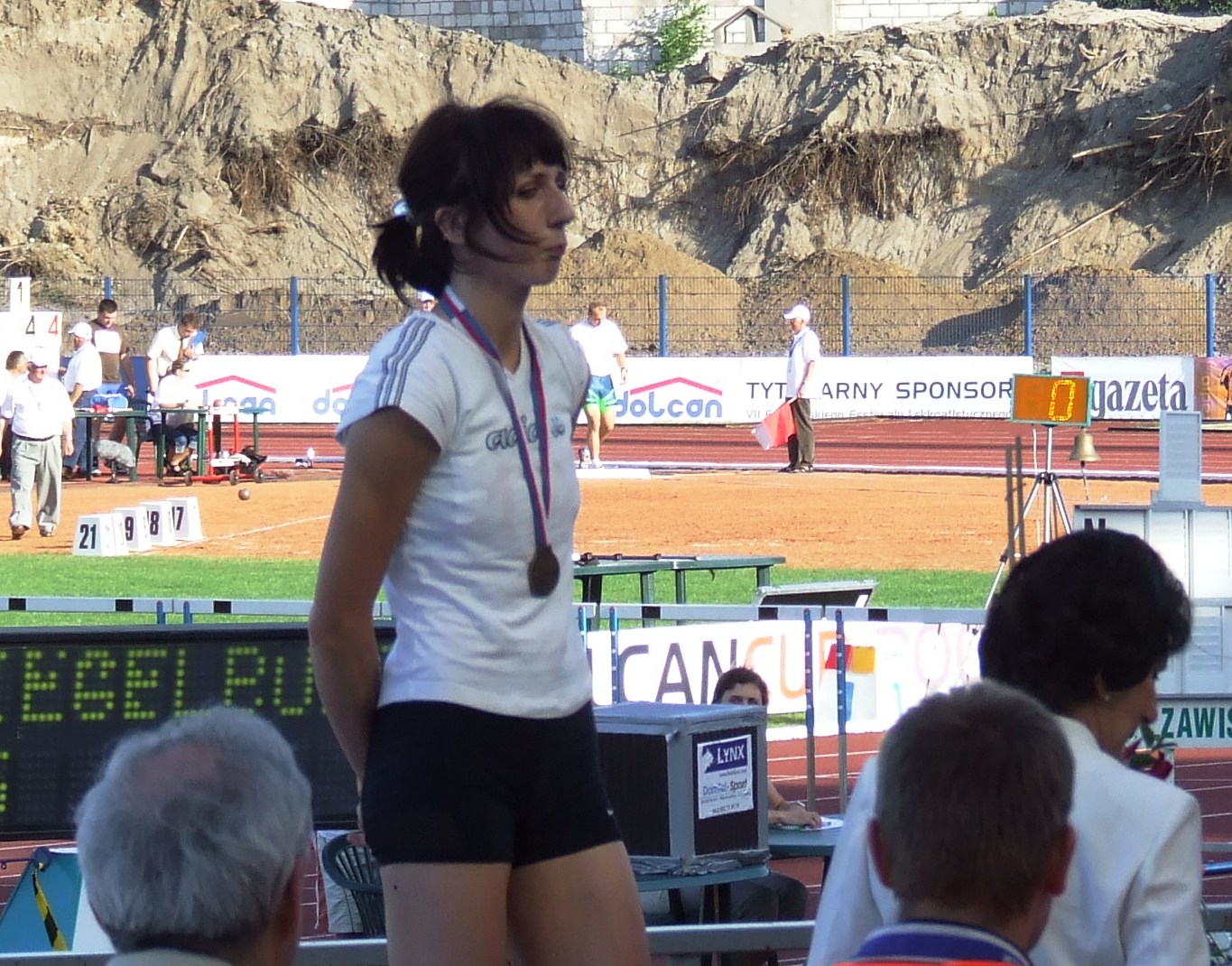
Joanna Kocielnik, 2007

Joanna Henryka Kocielnik (born 11 March 1983 in Warsaw) is a track and field sprint athlete who competes internationally for Poland.

Kocielnik represented Poland at the 2008 Summer Olympics in Beijing. She competed at the 4 x 100 metres relay together with Daria Korczyńska, Dorota Jędrusińska and Marta Jeschke. In their first round heat (without Kocielnik) they placed fifth behind Belgium, Great Britain, Brazil and Nigeria. Their time of 43.47 seconds was the second best non-directly qualifying time and the seventh time overall out of sixteen participating nations. With this result they qualified for the final in which they replaced Jeschke with Kocielnik. In the final they were eventually disqualified.
