= Shalonda Solomon =

American sprinter

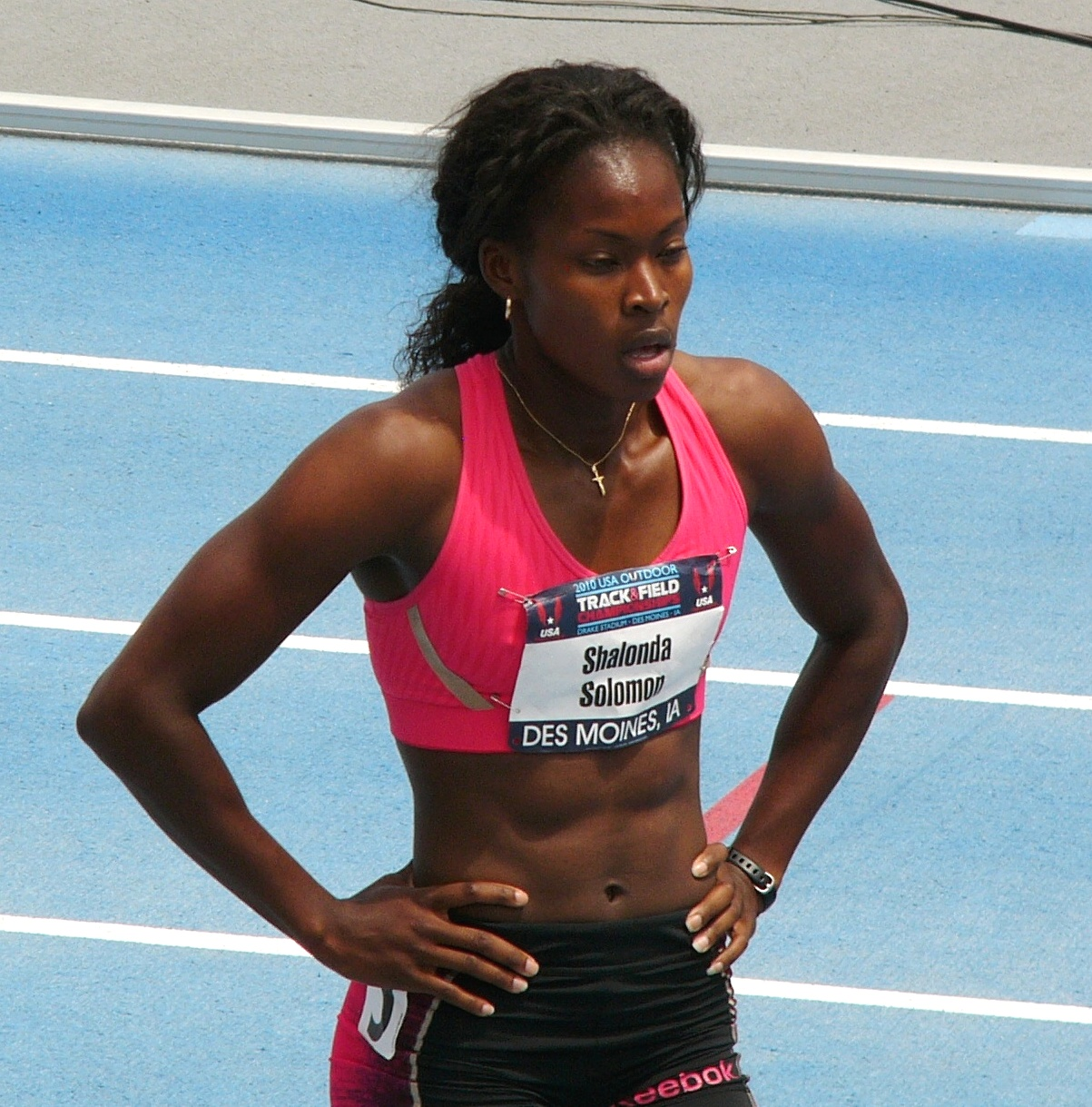
- Solomon during the 2010 USATF Championships

Personal information
- Nationality: United States
- Born: December 19, 1985 (age 40) Los Angeles, California, U.S.
- Height: 5 ft 6 1/2 in (1.69 m)
- Weight: 125 lb (57 kg)

Sport
- Sport: Running
- Events: 100 metres, 200 metres
Medal record
Women's athletics
Representing United States
World Championships
Gold medal – first place	2011 Daegu	4 × 100 m relay
World Relay Championships
Gold medal – first place	2014 Nassau	4 × 200 m relay
Continental Cup
Gold medal – first place	2010 Split	4 × 100 m relay
Silver medal – second place	2010 Split	100 m
World Junior Championships
Gold medal – first place	2004 Grosseto	200 m
Gold medal – first place	2004 Grosseto	4 × 100 m relay
NACAC Under-23 Championships in Athletics
Gold medal – first place	2006 Santo Domingo	200 m
Gold medal – first place	2006 Santo Domingo	4 × 100 m relay
Silver medal – second place	2006 Santo Domingo	100 m
Pan American Junior Championships
Gold medal – first place	2003 Bridgetown	100 m
Gold medal – first place	2003 Bridgetown	200 m
Gold medal – first place	2003 Bridgetown	4 × 100 m relay

Shalonda Solomon (born December 19, 1985) is an American track and field sprinter. Her greatest international accomplishment is a silver medal in the 100 m at the 2010 IAAF Continental Cup, while representing the Americas team. She qualified for the 2011 World Championships in Athletics by winning the 200 m at the USA Outdoor Track and Field Championships. Her 22.15 in winning that race was the world-leading time for 2011. While running in the World Championships, she ran far slower than at the National Championships, finishing a fourth-place in the 200 m behind Jamaican Veronica Campbell-Brown, and American teammates Carmelita Jeter and defending champion Allyson Felix. Later in those championships, she won a gold medal by serving on the American 4 × 100 m relay team in the preliminary rounds, being replaced by Felix in the final. She has a distinct head bob while running, something noticeable since high school.

== Biography ==
While at Long Beach Polytechnic High School in Long Beach, California, Solomon was named the Gatorade Athlete of the Year for the school year 2003–2004. At the CIF California State Meet, as a freshman in 2001 she finished just 0.02 behind Allyson Felix in the 100 m (and third behind Felix in the 200 m). In 2002 as a sophomore, she finished second to Felix in the 100 m see the race and 200 m see the race, and ran on her team's dominant 4 × 100 m relay and 4 × 400 m relay victories, leading her team to the team title., a feat she and her team duplicated in 2003 and in 2004, except after the graduation of Felix, Soloman was beaten by Bishop Amat Memorial High School senior Jasmin Baldwin.

While still in high school, Shalonda Solomon won the USA Junior Outdoor Championship at both 100 m and 200 m. This qualified her to run in the 2003 Pan American Junior Championships in Barbados for the United States, where she walked away with three gold medals in the two short sprints as well as the 4 × 100 m relay. Her victory at 200 m in 22.93 was a championship record performance. In her senior season in high school, Solomon finished runner-up in the 100 m and 200 m at the CIF State Meet, losing to a strong double win by Jasmine Baldwin, who ran 11.35 at 100 m and 22.86 at 200 m. Solomon did come through victorious in the 4 × 100 m relay and the 4 × 400 m relay, which is why she was voted the Gatorade Track Athlete of the Year for the second year in a row. During the summer of her final season of high school track, she had another great international performance, winning gold in the 200 m and 4 × 100 m relay at the 2004 World Junior Championships in Athletics.

Solomon moved to the collegiate level at the University of South Carolina, where she ran on their 2005 NCAA Women's Outdoor Track and Field Championship 4 × 400 m relay team. The following year she won both the NCAA Indoor and outdoor championship in the 200 m.

Shalonda Solomon finished second behind Felix at the USA Outdoor Track and Field Championships. In 2006 Solomon was named Women's Indoor Scholar Athlete of the Year by the U.S. Track & Field and Cross Country Coaches Association. Her junior year was limited by a strained left quadriceps muscle.

In 2007 Shalonda Solomon announced she would forgo her senior year of eligibility to turn professional after earning 10 NCAA All American honors, ultimately signing with Reebok.

In 2010, she repeated a second place at the USA National Championships in the 200 m.

In 2011, Solomon beat Carmelita Jeter to win the USA National Championships in the 200 m and qualify for the World Championships.

At the 2012 United States Olympic Trials (track and field), Solomon finished 12th in the 100 m and 20th in the 200 m representing Reebok in 11.29 and 24.17 respectively.

In 2013, Solomon finished 5th in the 200 m at the 2013 USA Outdoor Track and Field Championships in 22.33.

In 2014, Solomon finished 5th in the 100 m and 4th in the 200 m at the 2014 USA Outdoor Track and Field Championships in 11.40 and 22.54 respectively.

In 2015, Solomon represented adidas finished 11th in the 200 m at the 2015 USA Outdoor Track and Field Championships.
