= Monique Cabral =

Medal record

Athletics

Representing Trinidad and Tobago

CAC Junior Championships (U20)
| Silver medal – second place | 2004 Coatzacoalcos | 4x100 m relay |

CARIFTA Games Junior (U20)
| Silver medal – second place | 2003 Port of Spain | 4x100 m relay |

Monique Cabral (born December 9, 1986) is a sprinter from Trinidad and Tobago.

== Personal bests ==
| Year | Meet | Event | Time |
|---|---|---|---|
| 2007 | SEC Championships | 60M | 7.43 |
| 2009 NCAA Championships | 100M | 11.45 | |
| 2008 | LSU Tiger Invitational | 200M | 23.54 |
