= Aurélie Kamga =

French sprinter

Aurélie Kamga (born 18 June 1985 in Béziers, France) is a French sprinter who specializes in the 200 metres and 400 metres.

As a junior, she finished eighth in the 200 metres at the 2003 European Junior Championships and the 2004 World Junior Championships. At the 2004 World Junior Championships she also won a bronze medal in the 4 x 100 metres relay. In the 4 x 400 metres relay she also finished seventh at the 2009 World Championships. She won the 200 metres bronze medal at the 2005 Jeux de la Francophonie, and the 400 metres bronze medal at the 2009 Mediterranean Games.

Her personal best times are 7.48 seconds in the 60 metres (indoor), achieved in January 2006 in Mondeville; 11.57 seconds in the 100 metres, achieved in July 2004 in Niort; and 23.37 seconds in the 200 metres, achieved in July 2004 in Grosseto.
