= Wanda Hutson =

Trinidadian track and field sprint athlete

Personal information
- Born: January 8, 1985 (age 41) Port of Spain, Trinidad and Tobago

Sport
- Sport: Track and field
Medal record
Athletics
Representing Trinidad and Tobago
CAC Junior Championships (U20)
Gold medal – first place	2004 Coatzacoalcos	100 m
Silver medal – second place	2004 Coatzacoalcos	4 × 100 m relay
CAC Junior Championships (U17)
Silver medal – second place	2000 San Juan	4 × 100 m relay
Silver medal – second place	2000 San Juan	4 × 400 m relay
CARIFTA Games Junior (U20)
Silver medal – second place	2004 Hamilton	200 m
Silver medal – second place	2004 Hamilton	4 × 100 m relay
Silver medal – second place	2003 Port of Spain	4 × 100 m relay
Bronze medal – third place	2003 Port of Spain	100 m
Bronze medal – third place	2002 Nassau	100 m
CARIFTA Games Youth (U17)
Silver medal – second place	2001 Bridgetown	100 m
Silver medal – second place	2001 Bridgetown	200 m

Wanda Hutson (born January 8, 1985) is a track and field sprint athlete who competes internationally for Trinidad and Tobago.

Wanda attended Port of Spain's Bishop Anstey High School (2001) in Trinidad. She went on to Southern Union State Community College in Auburn, Alabama, and eventually graduated from Abilene Christian University, where she met her husband, Chris Woods, in 2010, with a first degree in Information Systems. Wanda was a two-time NCAA Division II All American for the ACU Wildcats in 2010.

Her best time of 11.38 (1.3) in the 100 m dash is a Trinidad & Tobago National Junior Record. Her best time in the 200 m is 23.65. Both performances came at the 2004 National Championships in Port-of-Spain. That year, she also won the Central American and Caribbean Junior Championships women's 100 m title with a time of 11.46, and was fourth in the finals of the women's 100 m at the IAAF World Junior Championships in Grosseto, Italy, running 11.45. She had been eighth (11.87) at the 2002 World Junior Championships in Kingston, Jamaica.

Wanda competed at the 2004 Summer Olympics in Athens, Greece, as a member of her country's sprint relay team, which failed to complete its race in the opening round. She again represented Trinidad and Tobago at the 2008 Summer Olympics in Beijing. She competed at the 4 × 100 metres relay together with Kelly-Ann Baptiste, Ayanna Hutchinson and Semoy Hackett. In their first round heat they did not finish and were eliminated due to a mistake with the baton exchange.

Wanda is 5 ft 4 in (163 cm) and weighs 104 pounds (47 kg).
