= Nelly Banco =

French sprinter

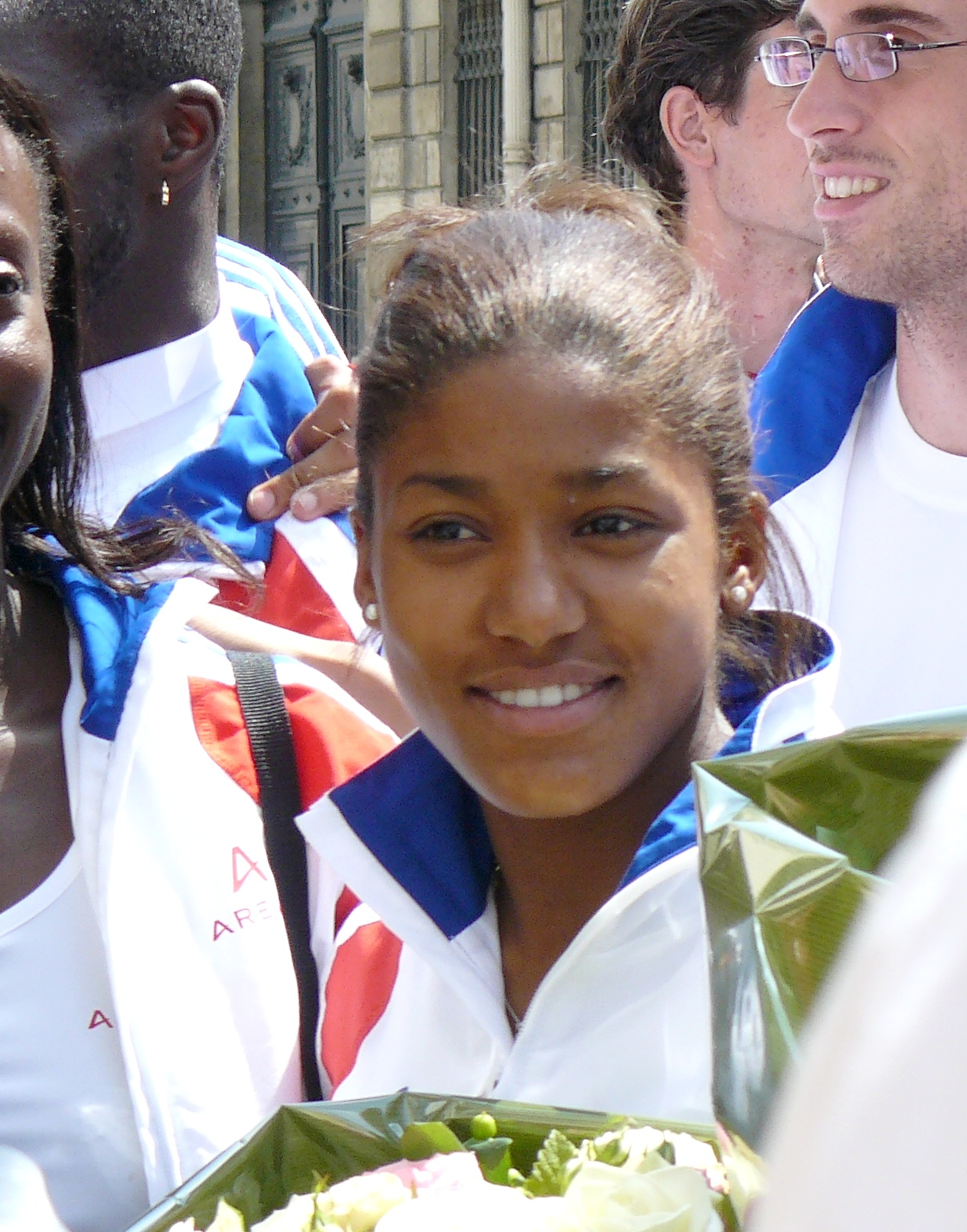
- Banco receiving medal at Barcelone à l'Élysée

Personal information
- Born: 17 February 1986 (age 40) Châtenay-Malabry, France
- Height: 1.61
- Weight: 53 kg (117 lb)

Sport
- Country: France
- Sport: Track and field
- Event(s): 100m, 200m, and 4 × 100 m relay
- Coached by: Alain JOUSSELIN

Achievements and titles
- Personal best: 22.98s (200m)
Medal record
Médaille de la Ville du Plessis-Robinson

Nelly Banco (born 17 February 1986 in Châtenay-Malabry) is a French athlete, specialising in the 200 metres.

In 2004, Nelly Banco won the bronze medal in the 4 × 100 metres relay during the Junior World Championships at Grosseto. The French team, also made up of Natacha Vouaux, Lina Jacques-Sébastien and aurélie kamga, established a new French junior record for the discipline in 43 68 s. French Junior Champion in the 200m in 2005, Nelly won a new bronze medal in the 400m relay at the Junior European Championships at Kaunas. Under 21s Champion of France in the 100 meters and 200 meters in 2006, she finished second in the 200 m at the under 21s European Championship at Debrecen behind the Russian Yuliya Chermoshanskaya.

His personal best of 200m is 22.98s, set in 2012 in Sotteville-lès-Rouen, France.

In 2010, Nelly Banco ran in the preliminary 4 × 100 m heats at the European Championships in Barcelona and allowed the French team to qualify for the final (43 35 s). Not selected for the final, she nevertheless received the silver medal for being part of the team in the previous rounds.

== Personal records ==
- 200 m : 22.98s (2012)
