= Sabina Veit =

Slovenian sprinter

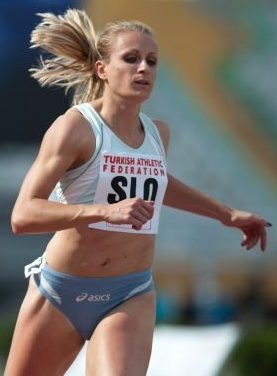
- Veit in 2011

Personal information
- Nationality: Slovenia
- Born: 5 December 1985 (age 40) Maribor, SR Slovenia, SFR Yugoslavia
- Height: 1.66 m (5 ft 5 1/2 in)
- Weight: 56 kg (123 lb)

Sport
- Sport: Athletics
- Event: Sprint
- Club: Poljane Maribor

Achievements and titles
- Personal best(s): 100 m: 11.83 s (2007); 200 m: 22.74 s (2008)
Medal record
Women's athletics
Representing Slovenia
Universiade
Bronze medal – third place	2009 Belgrade	200 m

Sabina Veit (born December 5, 1985, in Maribor) is a Slovenian sprinter. She set a personal best and an Olympic A-standard time of 22.74 seconds, by winning the 200 metres at the Slovenian Open Athletics Championships, coincidentally in her home city. She also won a bronze medal in the same distance at the 2009 Summer Universiade in Belgrade, finishing her time at 23.34 seconds.

Veit represented Slovenia at the 2008 Summer Olympics in Beijing, where she competed for the women's 200 metres. She ran in the third heat against seven other competitors, including United States' Marshevet Hooker, and four-time Olympian Debbie Ferguson-McKenzie of the Bahamas. She finished the race in fifth place by four hundredths of a second (0.04) behind Cyprus' Eleni Artymata, with a time of 23.62 seconds. Veit, however, failed to advance into the quarterfinals, as she placed thirty-fourth overall, and was ranked below four mandatory slots for the next round. She also tied her overall position with Barbados' Jade Bailey.
