= Pia Tajnikar =

Slovenian sprinter

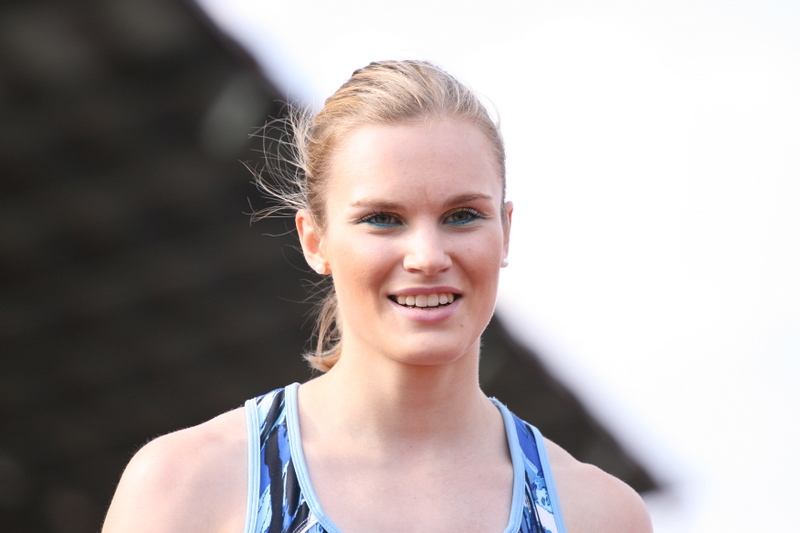
Pia Tajnikar in 2007

Pia Tajnikar (born 19 September 1985 in Ljubljana) is a track and field sprint athlete who competes internationally for Slovenia.

Tajnikar represented Slovenia at the 2008 Summer Olympics in Beijing. She competed in the 100 metres sprint and placed fifth in her heat without advancing to the second round. She ran the distance in a time of 11.82 seconds.
