= Christine Ohuruogu =

British sprinter (born 1984)

Christine Ohuruogu MBE
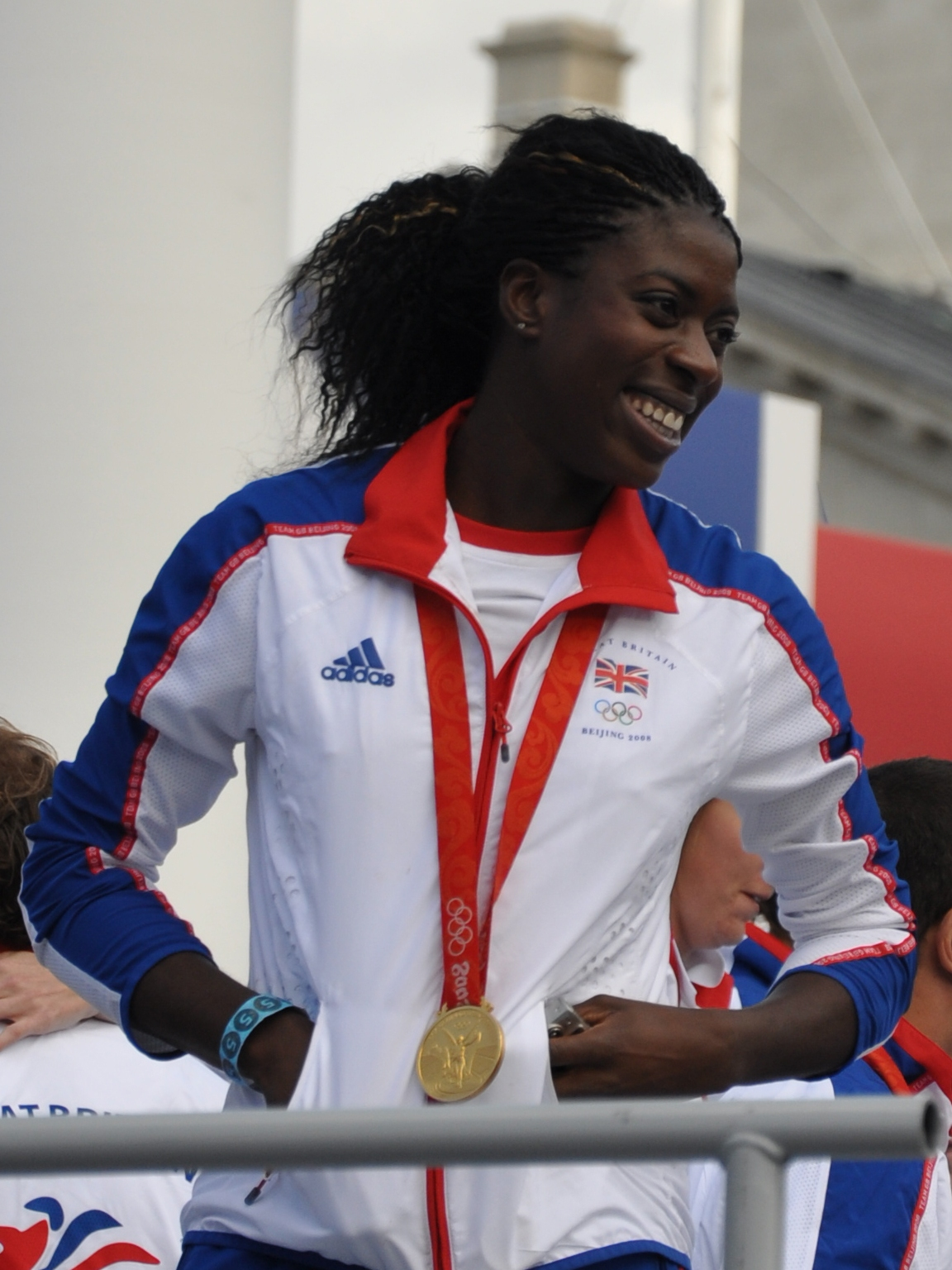
- Ohuruogu at the victory parade in London following the 2008 Summer Olympics

Personal information
- Born: 17 May 1984 (age 42) Newham, England
- Height: 1.75 m (5 ft 9 in)
- Weight: 68 kg (150 lb)
- Relative: Victoria Ohuruogu (sister)

Sport
- Country: Great Britain
- Club: Newham and Essex Beagles
- Turned pro: 2004

Achievements and titles
- Olympic finals: 2008 – 1st, 400 m 2012 – 2nd, 400 m
- World finals: 2007 – 1st 2013 – 1st
- Highest world ranking: 200 m: 11 (2008); 400 m: 2 (2007/2008)
- Personal bests: 100 m 11.35; 200 m 22.85; 400 m 49.41
Medal record
Event	1st	2nd	3rd
Olympic Games	1	1	2
World Championships	2	1	5
World Indoor Championships	1	0	1
European Indoor Championships	1	0	0
Commonwealth Games	1	0	1
World Athletics Final / Diamond League	0	1	2
European Team Ch'ships / Cup	2	1	1
European U23 / Junior Ch'ships	0	2	1
Total	8	6	13
Women's athletics
Representing Great Britain
Olympic Games
Gold medal – first place	2008 Beijing	400 m
Silver medal – second place	2012 London	400 m
Bronze medal – third place	2008 Beijing	4 × 400 m
Bronze medal – third place	2016 Rio de Janeiro	4 × 400 m
World Championships
Gold medal – first place	2007 Osaka	400 m
Gold medal – first place	2013 Moscow	400 m
Silver medal – second place	2013 Moscow	4 × 400 m
Bronze medal – third place	2005 Helsinki	4 × 400 m
Bronze medal – third place	2007 Osaka	4 × 400 m
Bronze medal – third place	2009 Berlin	4 × 400 m
Bronze medal – third place	2011 Daegu	4 × 400 m
Bronze medal – third place	2015 Beijing	4 × 400 m
World Indoor Championships
Gold medal – first place	2012 Istanbul	4 × 400 m
Bronze medal – third place	2014 Sopot	4 × 400 m
World Athletics Final
Silver medal – second place	2008 Stuttgart	400 m
Bronze medal – third place	2007 Stuttgart	400 m
Diamond League
Bronze medal – third place	2012	400 m
European Indoor Championships
Gold medal – first place	2013 Gothenburg	4 × 400 m
European Cup
Gold medal – first place	2005 Florence	4 × 400 m
Silver medal – second place	2008 Annecy	200 m
European Team Championships
Gold medal – first place	2013 Gateshead	4 × 400 m
Bronze medal – third place	2009 Leiria	200 m
European U23 Championships
Silver medal – second place	2005 Erfurt	400 m
Silver medal – second place	2005 Erfurt	4 × 400 m
European Junior Championships
Bronze medal – third place	2003 Tampere	400 m
Representing England
Commonwealth Games
Gold medal – first place	2006 Melbourne	400 m
Bronze medal – third place	2014 Glasgow	4 × 400 m
- Updated on 20 August 2016

Christine Ijeoma Ohuruogu // (born 17 May 1984) is a British former track and field athlete who specialised in the 400 metres, the event for which she is an Olympic, World and Commonwealth champion. The Olympic champion in 2008, and silver medalist in 2012, she is a double World Champion, having won the 400 m at the 2007 and 2013 World Championships. She has also won six World championship medals in the women's 4 × 400 m relay as part of the Great Britain and Northern Ireland team and bronze Olympic medals in the women's 4 × 400 m relay at the 2008 Beijing Games and the 2016 Rio Games, her final Olympics. Ohuruogu shares with Merlene Ottey and Usain Bolt the record for medalling in most successive global championships – 9 – between the 2005 World Championships in Athletics and the 2016 Summer Olympics.

Ohuruogu's personal best time of 49.41 seconds, set at the 2013 World Championships, beat the UK record set by Kathy Cook in 1984 by 0.02 seconds, simultaneously making her the first British woman to win two World Championship titles, and the first British woman to win three global titles (both achievements retrospectively moved to Jessica Ennis following her promotion to gold in the 2011 World Championships). Her relay bronze at the 2016 Summer Olympics made her only the second British track and field athlete, after Steve Backley to win medals at three successive Olympic Games. She was coached by Lloyd Cowan.

Known for her strength endurance, consistent pacing, her gift for maintaining speed in the final straight as rivals struggled and slowed, and her capacity to peak for major championships, Ohuruogu retired in 2017, a year after winning her final senior global medal, a bronze as part of the Great Britain Olympic 4 × 400 metre relay team, her 12th overall global medal. Upon retirement, Ohuruogu made public her plan to begin her second career, seeking to qualify in law, with the aim of being called to the Bar.

Ohuruogu mentored Matthew Hudson-Smith in 2022; their collaboration resulted in a British 400 metre record and a World Championship bronze medal, his first, for Hudson-Smith.

== Biography ==
Born to Igbo Nigerian parents in Newham, east London, she was raised in Stratford. She competed for Newham in the London Youth Games at both netball and athletics. She was inducted into the London Youth Games Hall of Fame in 2009. Ohuruogu studied at University College London, where she graduated in Linguistics in 2005. She also played netball during her undergraduate studies.

She has eight siblings, including Victoria Ohuruogu, a sprints competitor. She attended St. Edward's Church of England School (Romford) and Trinity Catholic High School (Woodford Green). She resumed her education in 2017 when she started a two-year law degree course at Queen Mary University of London. Ohuruogu is a member of Newham and Essex Beagles Athletics Club.

She was appointed MBE in the 2009 New Year Honours, and conferred with an Honorary Doctorate by the University of East London.

She is the author of the "Camp Gold" series of children's books about an elite training school for budding athletes.

== Athletics career ==
In 2003, Ohuruogu was a bronze medallist in 400 m at the European Junior Championships. She became the AAA champion in the 400 m in 2004, was a semi-finalist in the 400 m at the Athens Olympics of 2004, also taking part in the 4 × 400 m relay team that finished 4th. In the 2005 European Under 23 Championships she took the silver medal, losing individual gold by a hundredth of a second. She also won silver in the 4 × 400 m relay.

After reaching the semi-final at the 400 m at the 2005 World Championships in Athletics she won a bronze medal in the women's 4 × 400 m relay together with Lee McConnell, Donna Fraser and Nicola Sanders.

Ohuruogu won a gold medal for England in the 400 m at the 2006 Commonwealth Games in a personal best time of 50.28 seconds, beating favourite Tonique Williams-Darling in both the semi-final and the final.

She was banned for a year for missing three out-of-competition drug tests; one in October 2005 and then a further two in June 2006.

Within 24 days of the end of her year-long competition suspension she returned to win the gold medal at the 2007 World Championships in Osaka. Fellow British athlete, Nicola Sanders won silver with Novlene Williams of Jamaica third. Ohuruogu won all three of her individual races at the world championships – her heat, her semi-final and the final.

=== 2006 ===
At the 2006 Commonwealth Games, Ohuruogu missed out on a gold medal due to a mix-up caused by other members of her team. She ran the final leg in the 4 × 400 m relay for England, where the team finished over a second ahead of Australia, with Ohuruogu pulling away at the end. However, after the race the Australians were awarded the gold medal, after they protested that the English team had breached IAAF Rule 170 earlier in the race, when Tasha Danvers changed position with Tamsyn Lewis. Australian winner Jana Pittman offered the England team her gold medal, stating "They set the fastest time of the day and England are the winners of the race".

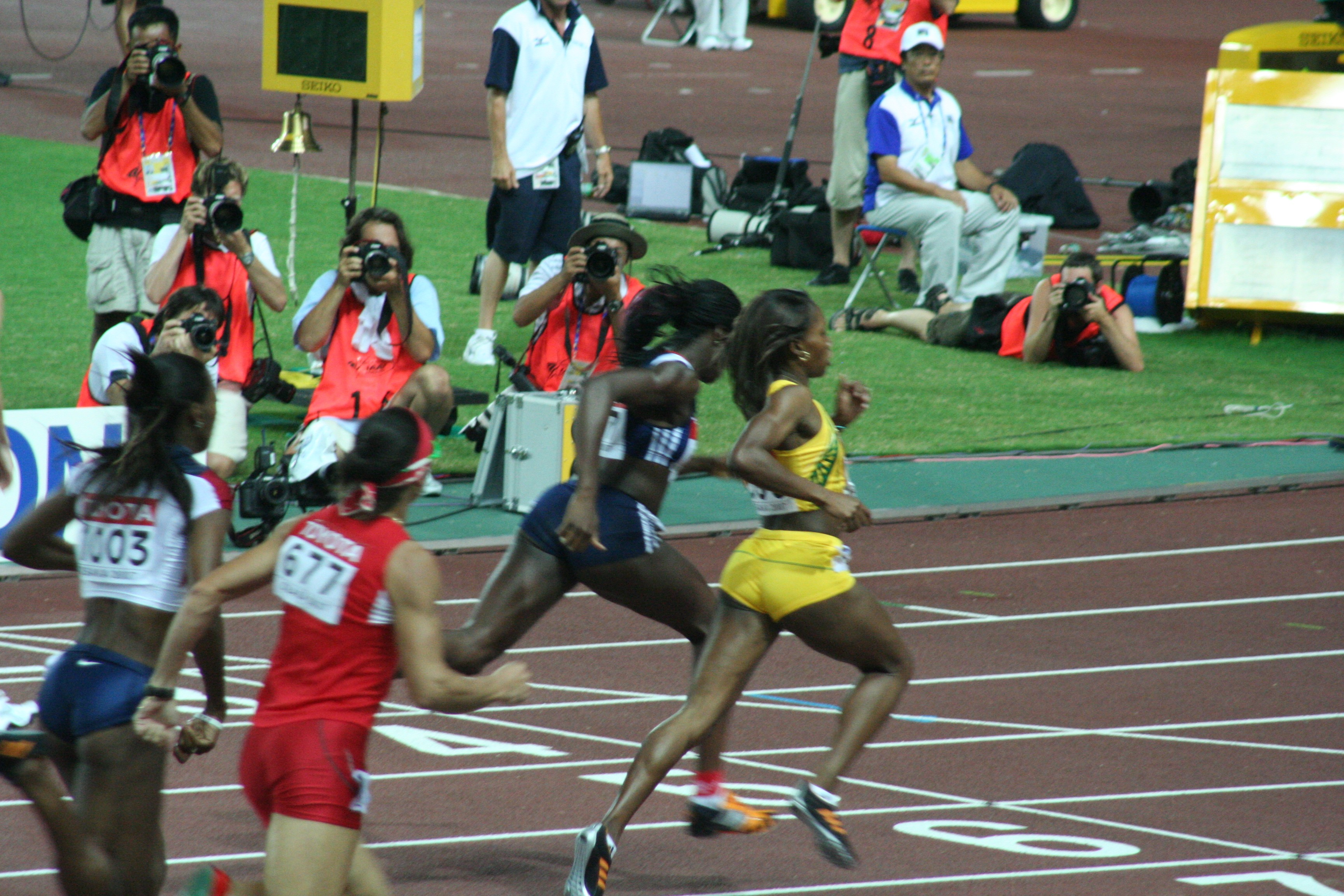
Christine Ohuruogu (in dark blue, centre) winning the 400 m at the 2007 World Championships in Athletics in Osaka, Japan.

Ohuruogu was suspended from competing in the 2006 European Athletics Championships because she had committed a violation of the anti-doping code. She missed three out-of-competition drug tests, known as the "whereabouts" system, of the World Anti-Doping Code; one in October 2005 and then a further two in June 2006. Under IAAF and British Olympic Association rules, she received a one-year ban for missing these tests, which expired on 5 August 2007. The final test missed occurred when Ohuruogu failed to inform the testers of a last-minute change of training venue after a double-booking. Due to the circumstances, the Independent Committee stated "There is no suggestion, nor any grounds for suspicion, that the offence may have been deliberate in order to prevent testing", and that a fair ban would have been 3 months. Ohuruogu passed tests 9 days before and 3 days after her final violation.

The British Olympic Association also imposed a lifetime ban on competing at future Olympic Games for Great Britain. She appealed to the Court of Arbitration for Sport, but the original decision was upheld, even though CAS emphasised that there was no suspicion of doping. Ohuruogu submitted a further appeal, citing the precedent of triathlete Tim Don. Ohuruogu suggested that she would probably leave Britain and compete in the Olympics for another country if her appeal was unsuccessful, but confessed "I haven't really given it any serious thought." Her Olympic ban was overturned on 27 November 2007.

=== 2007 ===
A day after her ban ended, Ohuruogu was selected for the British team at the 2007 Athletics World Championships. She had only run five competitive races before the final since her suspension; however, she won the individual 400 m, taking the only gold medal for Great Britain at the Championships. Nicola Sanders won silver. Ohuruogu was also part of the bronze medal-winning team in the 400 m relay.

=== 2008 ===
At the 2008 Summer Olympics in Beijing, Ohuruogu won her heat against Yulia Guschina who finished 0.18 seconds behind. She won the semi-final over Shericka Williams by 0.14 seconds. In the final, she became the first ever British female Olympic 400 m champion, by beating the pre-race favourite Sanya Richards (bronze) and Shericka Williams (silver), with a time of 49.62s, the fastest time of 2008. In doing so, Ohuruogu won the 50th gold medal for Great Britain in athletics at the Summer Olympics. She was once again ranked No. 2 in the world over 400 m behind Sanya Richards. Ohuruogu was also part of the bronze medal-winning team in the 4 × 400 m relay, initially finishing 5th but being upgraded to 3rd place following subsequent disqualifications for drugs offences of the teams finishing in 3rd and 4th place.

She won BOA Athlete of the Year at the UK Athletics Awards in 2008.

=== 2009 ===
In preparation for the European Indoor Championships in Turin, Ohuruogu set personal bests in the 60 metres and 200 m at the Birmingham Grand Prix. She competed at the 2009 Manchester City Games, finishing second in the 150 metres final in 17.10 seconds. She ran a personal best 22.85 seconds to take second place in the 200 m at the Fanny Blankers-Koen Games. While she won the 400 m national title at the UKA Championships in Birmingham that July, her times and finishes over the distance at IAAF Golden League meets were unimpressive. She had failed to break 51 seconds in the 2009 season; some distance behind world-leader Richards's best of 49.23 seconds. A hamstring problem caused her to withdraw from the London Grand Prix, raising doubts that she would be able to defend her World title. Ohuruogu's form improved in time for the 2009 World Championships, and she set a season's best time in her semi-final heat. She ran another season's best of 50.21s in the final, well behind Sanya Richards, who won in a time of 49.00s.

=== 2010 ===
Ohuruogu was ruled out of the European Championships in Barcelona with a thigh injury, and later in the year withdrew from the 2010 Commonwealth Games in Delhi, citing niggling injury that she did not want to aggravate.

=== 2011 ===
Ohuruogu was selected for the British team at the 2011 World Championships. She was disqualified from the individual 400 m after a false start.

=== 2012 ===
In the Indoor World Championships 4 × 400 m relay in Istanbul Ohuruogu, after legs from Shana Cox and Nicola Sanders took over in third place for Great Britain. Ohuruogu handed over to Perri Shakes-Drayton to hold off Sanya Richards-Ross to win Great Britain's first ever IAAF World Indoor Championships medal in the Women's 4 × 400 m relay.

Ohuruogu won the silver medal at 400 m in the 2012 London Olympics. In a close race Sanya Richards-Ross held on to take the gold while Ohuruogu produced a fast finish to beat DeeDee Trotter and Amantle Montsho by just a few hundredths of a second to take the silver. Trotter finished third. Richards-Ross won in 49.55s; Ohuruogu ran a season's best time of 49.70, which is only the third time she ran under 50 seconds. Ohuruogu said she was "heartbroken" to not be able to defend her title. With her family home less than a mile away from the Olympic Stadium in Stratford, she had been picked out as the public face of the Games when London was awarded the Olympics in 2005, but after her suspension her image was removed from publicity material. Ohuruogu had a low-key build up to the Games, with the burden of "poster girl" falling instead on Jessica Ennis.

=== 2013 ===
Ohuruogu claimed a second world title on 12 August 2013, becoming the first British woman to do so, by winning the 400 m final in Moscow. A late surge helped her pip Montsho in a photo finish, and beat Kathy Cook's long-standing British record in the process, with a time of 49.41s, beating Montsho by 0.004 seconds.

=== 2014 ===
Ohuruogu only entered the 4 × 400 m Women's relay at the 2014 IAAF World Indoor Championships, alongside her sister Victoria Ohuruogu, attempting to defend the title that Great Britain had won two years earlier in Istanbul, however the team finished in bronze medal position.

=== 2015 ===
Despite an injury-ravaged season, Ohuruogu reached the final of the 400 m at the World Championships in Beijing, the scene of her Olympic triumph in 2008, as the defending champion. She finished in eighth place with a time of 50.63.

She led off the British 4 × 400 m relay at the same championships, helping them to win a bronze medal.

=== 2016 ===
Ohuruogu won the bronze medal at the 4 × 400 m relay in the 2016 Rio Olympics, running the final leg. Running the first three legs were Eilidh Doyle, Anyika Onuora and Emily Diamond, and they finished in a time of 3:25.88, behind the US and Jamaica.

=== 2017 and retirement ===
Ohuruogu missed out on selection for the individual 400 m at the 2017 World Championships in her hometown of London, failing to advance to the final at the GB World Championship trials in June of that year after finishing third in her heat with a time which was five seconds down on her personal best. She subsequently stated that 2017 would be her last season in competition, and that she would be open to competing in the 4 × 400 m relay at the World Championships if selected. Although she was not selected for the Worlds, she did attend the Championships, supporting the British women's 4 × 400 m team that took a silver medal there, and along with her 4 × 400 m team-mates, was presented with three medals from the 2009, 2011 and 2013 Worlds after the Russian squads which had finished ahead of Team GB in those Championships were disqualified due to doping. The British teams received bronzes for 2009 and 2011, and a silver for 2013.

In June 2018, on the first day of the British Athletics Championships, Ohuruogu confirmed her retirement from competition, indicating that although she did not feel ready to retire at the end of 2017 her subsequent training had been restricted due to injuries and her studies.

== Personal bests ==
Event	Best	Location	Date
60 metres	7.54 s	Birmingham, England	21 February 2009
100 metres	11.35 s	Irvine, California, United States	4 May 2008
200 metres	22.85 s	Hengelo, Netherlands	1 June 2009
400 metres	49.41 s	Moscow, Russia	12 August 2013

== International titles ==
Preceded by Aliann Pompey (Guyana)	Commonwealth Champion in 400 m 2006	Succeeded by Amantle Montsho (Botswana)
Preceded by Tonique Williams-Darling (The Bahamas)	World Champion in 400 m 2007	Succeeded by Sanya Richards (United States)
Preceded by Tonique Williams-Darling (The Bahamas)	Olympic Champion in 400 m 2008	Succeeded by Sanya Richards-Ross (United States)
Preceded by Amantle Montsho (Botswana)	World Champion in 400 m 2013	Succeeded by Allyson Felix (United States)
Preceded by United States; Debbie Dunn; DeeDee Trotter; Natasha Hastings; Allyson Felix	World Indoor Champion in 4 × 400 m relay representing Great Britain with Shana Cox; Nicola Sanders; Perri Shakes-Drayton; 2012	Succeeded by United States; Natasha Hastings; Joanna Atkins; Francena McCorory; Cassandra Tate; Jernail Hayes*; Monica Hargrove*
Preceded by Russia; Kseniya Zadorina; Kseniya Vdovina; Yelena Migunova; Olesya Forsheva	European Indoor Champion in 4 × 400 m relay representing Great Britain with Eilidh Child; Shana Cox; Perri Shakes-Drayton; 2013	Succeeded by France; Floria Gueï; Elea-Mariama Diarra; Agnès Raharolahy; Marie Gayot

== National titles ==
- AAA Championships
  - 400 metres: 2004
- British Athletics Championships
  - 400 metres: 2009
