= Marina Karnaushchenko =

Russian sprinter

Personal information
- Born: October 2, 1988 (age 37)
Medal record
Athletics
Representing Russia
World Indoor Championships
Disqualified	2012 Istanbul	4x400 m relay

Marina Karnaushchenko (born October 2, 1988) is a Russian sprint athlete. She was part of the Russian team that won the bronze medal at the 2012 IAAF World Indoor Championships.
