= 2012 IAAF World Indoor Championships – Women's 400 metres =

The women's 400 metres at the 2012 IAAF World Indoor Championships was held at the Ataköy Athletics Arena on 9 and 10 March.

== Medalists ==
Gold	Silver	Bronze
Sanya Richards-Ross; United States	Aleksandra Fedoriva; Russia	Natasha Hastings; United States

== Records ==
Standing records prior to the 2012 IAAF World Indoor Championships
World record	Jarmila Kratochvílová (TCH)	49.59	Milan, Italy	7 March 1982
Championship record	Olesya Forsheva (RUS)	50.04	Moscow, Russia	12 March 2006
World Leading	Sanya Richards-Ross (USA)	50.71	Albuquerque, United States	26 February 2012
African record	Charity Opara (NGR)	50.73	Stuttgart, Germany	1 February 1998
Asian record	Li Yajun (CHN)	52.27	Beijing, China	24 February 1996
European record	Jarmila Kratochvílová (TCH)	49.59	Milan, Italy	7 March 1982
North and Central American and Caribbean record	Christine Amertil (BAH)	50.34	Moscow, Russia	12 March 2006
Oceanian Record	Maree Holland (AUS)	52.17	Budapest, Hungary	4 March 1989
South American record	Aliann Pompey (GUY)	51.83	New York City, United States	26 February 2010

== Qualification standards ==
Indoor	Outdoor
53.25	51.25

== Schedule ==
Date	Time	Round
March 9, 2012	9:35	Heats
March 9, 2012	19:50	Semifinals
March 10, 2012	18:40	Final

== Results ==
=== Heats ===
Qualification: First 2 in each heat (Q) and the next 6 fastest (q) advance to the semifinals.

Rank	Heat	Name	Nationality	Time	Notes
1	2	Nataliya Pyhyda	Ukraine	52.02	Q, SB
2	3	Sanya Richards-Ross	United States	52.81	Q
3	1	Denisa Rosolová	Czech Republic	52.95	Q
4	1	Vania Stambolova	Bulgaria	52.97	Q
5	2	Patricia Hall	Jamaica	52.99	Q
6	6	Shana Cox	Great Britain	53.24	Q
7	4	Aleksandra Fedoriva	Russia	53.26	Q
8	4	Dominique Blake	Jamaica	53.39	Q
9	4	Muizat Ajoke Odumosu	Nigeria	53.47	q
10	2	Meliz Redif	Turkey	53.55	q
11	3	Nadine Okyere	Great Britain	53.56	Q
12	6	Irina Davydova	Russia	53.58	Q
13	5	Natasha Hastings	United States	53.64	Q
14	1	Maria Enrica Spacca	Italy	53.74	q
14	3	Tiandra Ponteen	Saint Kitts and Nevis	53.74	q
16	5	Moa Hjelmer	Sweden	54.01	Q
DQ	3	Bimbo Miel Ayedou	Benin	~~54.44~~	q, ~~NR~~ †
17	5	Aliann Pompey	Guyana	54.63	q
18	6	Ambwene Simukonda	Malawi	55.51	
19	6	Kineke Alexander	Saint Vincent and the Grenadines	55.88	
20	2	Amaliya Sharoyan	Armenia	56.41	
21	1	Déborah Rodríguez	Uruguay	57.08	
22	4	Natacha Ngoye	Congo	58.21	
23	1	Sharon Kwarula	Papua New Guinea	59.56	
24	5	Graciela Martins	Guinea-Bissau	59.83	
25	2	Danielle Alakija	Fiji	1:00.00	
26	5	Vladislava Ovcharenko	Tajikistan	1:00.33	NR
27	6	Gaiane Ustiane	Georgia	1:01.38	
28	6	Maziah Mahusin	Brunei	1:03.69	NR
29	2	Amy Atkinson	Guam	1:05.99	NR
	3	Geisa Aparecida Coutinho	Brazil	DQ	
	4	Munguntuya Batgerel	Mongolia	DQ	

=== Semifinals ===
Qualification: First 2 of each heat qualified (Q).

Rank	Heat	Name	Nationality	Time	Notes
1	3	Sanya Richards-Ross	United States	50.99	Q
2	3	Aleksandra Fedoriva	Russia	51.79	Q
3	1	Natasha Hastings	United States	51.87	Q
4	1	Vania Stambolova	Bulgaria	51.87	Q
5	1	Nataliya Pyhyda	Ukraine	51.98	SB
6	1	Moa Hjelmer	Sweden	52.29	NR
7	2	Shana Cox	Great Britain	52.69	Q
8	2	Denisa Rosolová	Czech Republic	52.78	Q
9	2	Dominique Blake	Jamaica	53.00	
10	2	Irina Davydova	Russia	53.02	
11	3	Patricia Hall	Jamaica	53.21	
12	3	Nadine Okyere	Great Britain	53.66	
13	2	Maria Enrica Spacca	Italy	53.71	
14	1	Muizat Ajoke Odumosu	Nigeria	54.06	
DQ	3	Bimbo Miel Ayedou	Benin	~~54.26~~	~~NR~~, †
15	3	Meliz Redif	Turkey	54.48	
	1	Aliann Pompey	Guyana	DNF	
	2	Tiandra Ponteen	Saint Kitts and Nevis	DNF	

- † = Bimbo Miel Ayedou's sample later tested positive for banned substances and she was disqualified.

=== Final ===
Rank	Name	Nationality	Time	Notes
1st place, gold medalist(s)	Sanya Richards-Ross	United States	50.79	
2nd place, silver medalist(s)	Aleksandra Fedoriva	Russia	51.76	
3rd place, bronze medalist(s)	Natasha Hastings	United States	51.82	
4	Vania Stambolova	Bulgaria	51.99	
5	Shana Cox	Great Britain	52.13	PB
6	Denisa Rosolová	Czech Republic	52.48	
