= Monica Hargrove =

American sprinter

Personal information
- Nationality: American
- Born: December 30, 1982 (age 43) New Haven, Connecticut, United States

Sport
- Sport: Track and field
- Events: 200 m, 400 m
- College team: Georgetown University
Medal record
Representing United States
Women's athletics
World Indoor Championships
Gold medal – first place	2014 Sopot	4 × 400 m relay
Silver medal – second place	2006 Moscow	4 × 400 m relay

Monica Hargrove (born December 30, 1982) is an American track and field athlete who specializes in the 200- and 400-meter dash. She won the silver medal at the 2006 IAAF World Indoor Championships as part of the 4 × 400-meter relay team, and also set a world best in the sprint medley relay at the Penn Relays that year.

== College career ==
A native of New Haven, Connecticut, she began her amateur track career at Georgetown University. There she was selected as an All-American in 2002, 2003 and 2004 for her part in Georgetown's sprint medley relay team. She competed for the Georgetown Hoyas in the Big East Conference, forming part of the outdoor champion 4 × 400 meter relay team in 2002, and winning the indoor 500 meter race in 2003. In 2004 Hargrove suffered a number of injury setbacks and, after graduating with a degree in psychology, she took on a volunteer counselor role at a high school track and field camp. She stated that the presence of performance-enhancing drug use had made a professional track career less appealing to her. However, motivated by the atmosphere in the camp, she return to her track career in mid-2005.

== Professional career ==
The 2006 season represented a breakthrough into the elite level of competition in the United States. She finished fourth in the 400 meters at the US indoor championships and was selected for the US relay team at the 2006 IAAF World Indoor Championships. Running with Debbie Dunn, Tiffany Williams, and Mary Danner, she won the silver medal in 3 min 28.63 seconds, her first major medal in international competition. She experienced more team success that year, setting a world best of 3:37.16 in the sprint medley relay at the Penn Relays with Rachelle Boone-Smith, Lauryn Williams, and Hazel Clark.

In 2007, she won 400 m at the Boston Indoor Games, setting an indoor best of 52.85 seconds. She also had fifth-place finish at the Reebok Grand Prix in 2007. She competed in Europe in the summer of 2008, taking third at the DN Galan, and fourth at the London Grand Prix and DecaNation meetings.

=== 2009 season ===
Hargrove won the 600 meter race at the Millrose Games, narrowly beating Aliann Pompey. Success continued in the relay events, as she set a world leading time in the 4 × 400-meter relay with Natasha Hastings, Allyson Felix and Sanya Richards at the 2009 Penn Relays. This time was only bettered by the medal winning teams at the World Championships that year. A sixth-place finish at the national track and field championships in June meant that she had not qualified for the US team at the 2009 World Championships.

She was a prominent fixture on the European athletics circuit, competing at IAAF Golden League and Super Grand Prix meets. This included a win at the 2009 DecaNation competition, and second-place finish at the Athens Grand Prix, where she set a new 400 m best of 50.39 seconds.

Near the end of the 2009 season, Hargrove was among the top twelve 400 m runners (and the fifth fastest American) that year. As one of the top ranked runners on the IAAF World Athletics Tour, she was entered in the 2009 IAAF World Athletics Final.

== Personal bests ==
Event	Time (sec)	Venue	Date
200-meter dash	23.17	Kortrijk, Belgium	July 11, 2010
400-meter dash	50.39	Athens, Greece	July 13, 2009
400-meter dash (indoor)	52.26	Boston, Massachusetts, United States	February 25, 2007
500-meter dash (indoor)	1:12.31	University Park, Pennsylvania, United States	January 26, 2002

- All information taken from IAAF profile.
