= 2012 IAAF World Indoor Championships – Women's 4 × 400 metres relay =

The women's 4 × 400 metres relay at the 2012 IAAF World Indoor Championships was held at the Ataköy Athletics Arena on 11 March 2012. Perri Shakes-Drayton held off individual champion Sanya Richards-Ross to claim Great Britain's first-ever medal in this event. Ukraine originally finished fourth, but were later disqualified as their first leg runner (Bryzhina) inadvertently ran outside her assigned lane.

The winning margin was 0.03 seconds which as of July 2024 remains the only time the women's 4x400 metres relay was won by less than a tenth of a second at these championships.

== Medalists ==
Gold	Silver	Bronze
Great Britain; Shana Cox; Nicola Sanders; Christine Ohuruogu; Perri Shakes-Drayton	United States; Leslie Cole; Natasha Hastings; Jernail Hayes; Sanya Richards-Ross	Romania; Angela Moroșanu; Alina Panainte; Adelina Pastor; Elena Mirela Lavric

== Records ==
Standing records prior to the 2012 IAAF World Indoor Championships
World record	Russia (RUS)	3:23.37	Glasgow, Great Britain	28 January 2006
Championship record	Russia (RUS)	3:23.88	Budapest, Hungary	7 March 2004
World Leading	University of Kansas	3:31.36	College Station, United States	25 February 2012
Asian record	India (IND)	3:37.46	Doha, Qatar	16 February 2008
European record	Russia (RUS)	3:23.37	Glasgow, Great Britain	28 January 2006
North and Central American and Caribbean record	United States (USA)	3:27.34	Doha, Qatar	14 March 2010
Oceanian Record	Australia (AUS)	3:26.87	Maebashi, Japan	7 March 1999

== Schedule ==
Date	Time	Round
March 11, 2012	16:40	Final

== Results ==
=== Final ===
Started at 16:40.

Rank	Nation	Athletes	Time	Notes
1st place, gold medalist(s)	Great Britain	Shana Cox, Nicola Sanders, Christine Ohuruogu, Perri Shakes-Drayton	3:28.76	WL
2nd place, silver medalist(s)	United States	Leslie Cole, Natasha Hastings, Jernail Hayes, Sanya Richards-Ross	3:28.79	SB
3rd place, bronze medalist(s)	Romania	Angela Moroșanu, Alina Panainte, Adelina Pastor, Elena Mirela Lavric	3:33.41	SB
4	Belarus	Hanna Tashpulatava, Yulyana Yushchanka, Iryna Khliustava, Sviatlana Usovich	3:33.73	SB
	Ukraine	Yelizaveta Bryzhina, Iuliia Olishevska, Olha Zemlyak, Nataliya Pyhyda	DQ	R 163.3
	Russia	Yuliya Gushchina, Kseniya Ustalova, Marina Karnaushchenko, Aleksandra Fedoriva	3:29.55	DQ
