= Shana Cox =

American sprinter who competes internationally for Great Britain since 2011

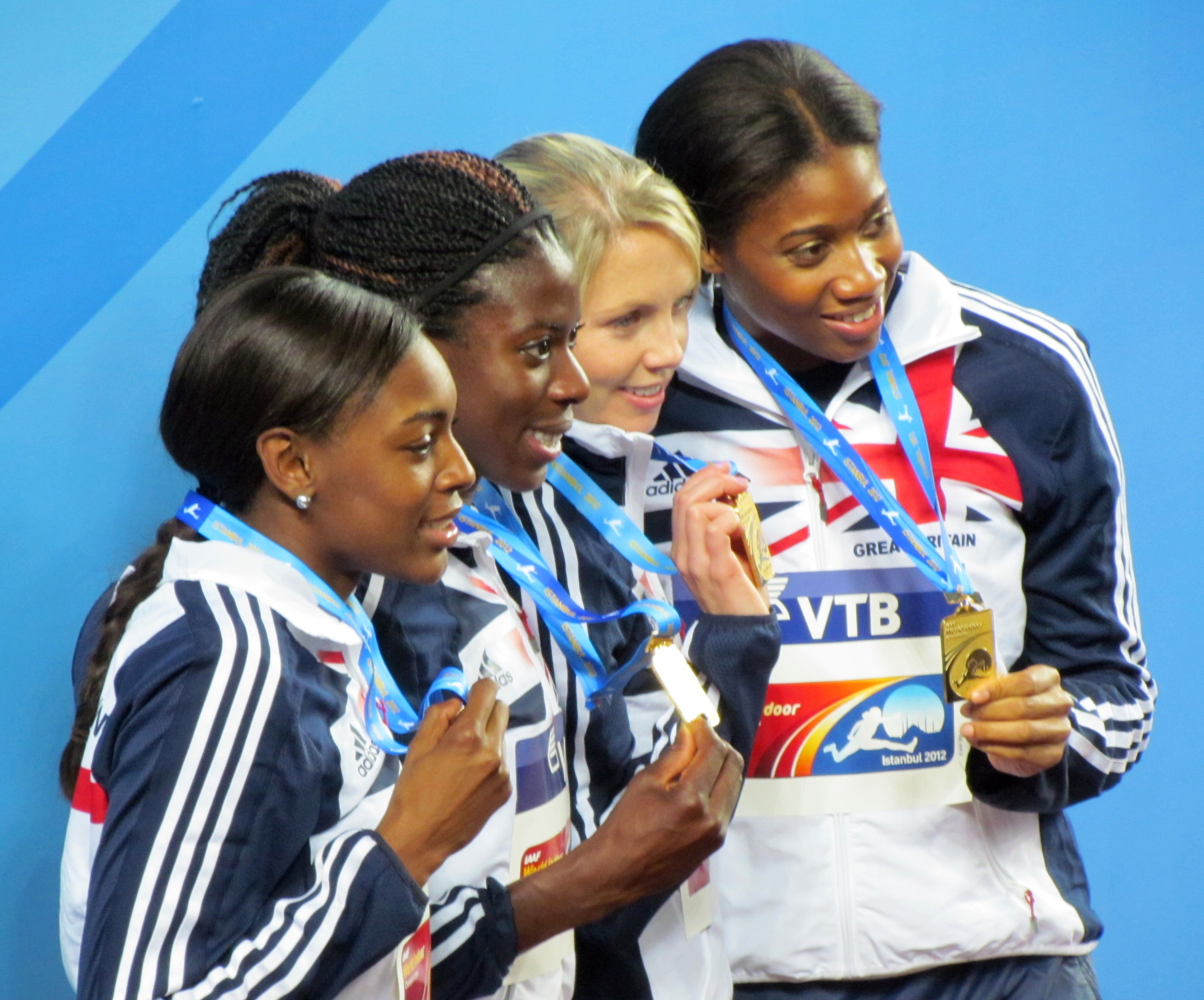
- Shana Cox (right)

Personal information
- Born: Shana Amanda Cox; January 22, 1985 (age 41) Brooklyn, New York, U.S.
- Education: Penn State
- Height: 1.72 m (5 ft 8 in)
- Weight: 65 kg (143 lb)

Sport
- Country: Great Britain (2011–2016); United States (2003–2011)
- Sport: Athletics
- Event(s): 400 metres 4 × 400 m relay
- Club: Woodford Green with Essex Ladies
Medal record
Representing United Kingdom
World Championships
Silver medal – second place	2013 Moscow	4 × 400 m relay
World Indoor Championships
Gold medal – first place	2012 Istanbul	4 × 400 m relay
Bronze medal – third place	2014 Sopot	4 × 400 m relay
European Championships
Bronze medal – third place	2014 Zürich	4 × 400 m relay
European Indoors Championships
Gold medal – first place	2013 Gothenburg	4 × 400 m relay
Representing England
Commonwealth Games
Bronze medal – third place	2014 Glasgow	4 × 400 m relay

Shana Amanda Cox (born January 22, 1985) is an American-born track and field retired athlete, who during her career represented both the United States and Great Britain. She specialised in the 400 metres.

Cox was born in Brooklyn, New York to parents of British descent. Growing up in Long Island, New York, she attended Trinity Lutheran School in Hicksville, New York, as well as the Holy Trinity Diocesan High School and Penn State. In her senior year at college, she won the 400 metres and 4 × 400 metres relay at the 2008 NCAA Women's Outdoor Track and Field Championship.

In 2011, the International Association of Athletics Federations approved Cox's transfer of allegiance from the US to Great Britain, the birthplace of both her parents.

Competing in her first major competition for Great Britain, Cox won a gold medal in the women's 4 × 400 metres relay at the 2012 IAAF World Indoor Championships in Istanbul, Turkey, as part of a team that also included Nicola Sanders, Christine Ohuruogu and Perri Shakes-Drayton.

On November 9, 2013, she married Michael Bingham, also an American-born sprinter representing Great Britain.

== Achievements ==
Year	Competition	Venue	Position	Event	Notes
Representing the United States
2003	Pan American Junior Championships	Bridgetown, Barbados	3rd	200 metres	23.39
2004	World Junior Championships	Grosseto, Italy	5th	200m	23.63 (wind: -0.2 m/s)
2006	NACAC Under-23 Championships	Santo Domingo, Dominican Republic	1st	400 metres	51.15
2006	NACAC Under-23 Championships	Santo Domingo, Dominican Republic	1st	4 × 400 m relay	3:29.05
Representing United Kingdom
2011	European Team Championships	Stockholm, Sweden	3rd	400 metres	51.49
2012	World Indoor Championships	Istanbul, Turkey	5th	400 metres	52.13
2012	World Indoor Championships	Istanbul, Turkey	1st	4 × 400 m relay	3:28.76
2012	Olympic Games	London, United Kingdom	7th (sf)	400 metres	52.58
2012	Olympic Games	London, United Kingdom	5th	4 × 400 m relay	3:24.76
2013	World Championships	Moscow, Russia	3rd	4 × 400 m relay	3:22.61
2014	European Championships	Zürich, Switzerland	3rd	4 × 400 m relay	3:24.34

== Personal bests ==
Event	Best	Location	Date
200 metres	23.15 s	Champaign, United States	May 18, 2008
400 metres	50.84 s	Tallahassee, United States	May 31, 2008
200 metres (indoor)	23.48 s	State College, United States	January 29, 2005
400 metres (indoor)	52.13 s	Istanbul, Turkey	March 10, 2012

== See also ==
- List of Pennsylvania State University Olympians

Preceded by Russia; Kseniya Zadorina; Kseniya Vdovina; Yelena Migunova; Olesya Forsheva	European Indoor Champion in 4 × 400 m relay representing Great Britain with Eilidh Child; Christine Ohuruogu; Perri Shakes-Drayton; 2013	Succeeded by France; Floria Gueï; Elea-Mariama Diarra; Agnès Raharolahy; Marie Gayot
