= Aleksandra Fedoriva =

Russian sprinter (born 1988)

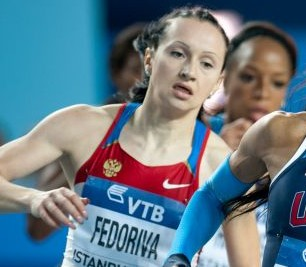
- Fedoriva during 2012 IAAF World Indoor Championships in Istanbul

Personal information
- Full name: Aleksandra Andreyevna Fedoriva
- Born: 13 September 1988 (age 37) Moscow, Russia

Sport
- Country: Russia
- Sport: Women's athletics
Medal record
Olympic Games
Disqualified	2008 Beijing	4 × 100 m relay
World Indoor Championships
Silver medal – second place	2012 Istanbul	400 m
Disqualified	2012 Istanbul	4 × 400 m relay
European Championships
Bronze medal – third place	2010 Barcelona	200 metres
Continental Cup
Gold medal – first place	2010 Split	200 metres
European U23 Championships
Gold medal – first place	2009 Kaunas	200 metres

Aleksandra Andreyevna Fedoriva (Russian: Александра Андреевна Федорива; born 13 September 1988) is a Russian track and field athlete who competes mainly in sprinting events.

Daughter to Soviet athlete Andrey Fedoriv, Fedoriva began her career as a hurdles specialist. She was a semi-finalist in the 100 metres hurdles at the 2005 World Youth Championships in Athletics, took fourth at the 2006 World Junior Championships in Athletics, then won the gold medal in the event at the 2007 European Athletics Junior Championships the following year. In 2007, she ran a Russian junior record in the 60 metres hurdles, completing the distance in 8.22 seconds. This mark stood for five years.

Fedoriva represented Russia at the 2008 Summer Olympics in Beijing competing at the 4 × 100 metres relay, together with Yuliya Chermoshanskaya, Yulia Gushchina and Yevgeniya Polyakova. In their first round heat they placed second behind Jamaica with a time of 42.87 seconds (the second fastest time in qualifying). In the final they finished in 42.31 seconds, taking first place and the gold medal, while the Jamaicans failed to finish due to a bad baton exchange. In August 2016, Fedoriva and her three relay teammates were stripped of their Olympic gold medal due to a doping violation by Chermoshanskaya.

The 2009 European Athletics U23 Championships saw Fedoriva move into longer distances as she won the women's 200 metres title. Fedoriva was a semi-finalist in the 60 m hurdles at the 2010 IAAF World Indoor Championships, but found greater success over longer sprint distances in the outdoor season: she was a bronze medallist in the 200 m at the 2010 European Athletics Championships and took the gold medal for Europe in that event at the 2010 IAAF Continental Cup. The following year she took bronze over 100 metres at the 2011 European Team Championships and reached the semi-finals over that distance at the 2011 World Championships in Athletics. She anchored the women's relay team to fifth place at that competition.

She made her indoor debut over 400 metres at the 2012 Russian Championships and won the hotly contested final in a time of 51.18 seconds.

At the 2012 Summer Olympics, Fedoriva came in third in the 200 m semifinal, meaning that she could not advance to the final.
