= 2014 IAAF World Indoor Championships – Women's 4 × 400 metres relay =

The women's 4 × 400 metres relay at the 2014 IAAF World Indoor Championships took place on 8–9 March 2014. The gold medal was won by the United States, with Jamaica and Great Britain taking the silver and bronze, respectively.

== Doping ==
The Russian team finished fourth in the final and was later disqualified after Kseniya Ryzhova's doping sample from 7 March 2014 was found positive for trimetazidine.

== Medalists ==
Gold	Silver	Bronze
United States; Natasha Hastings; Joanna Atkins; Francena McCorory; Cassandra Tate; Jernail Hayes*; Monica Hargrove*	Jamaica; Patricia Hall; Anneisha McLaughlin; Kaliese Spencer; Stephenie Ann McPherson; Verone Chambers*; Natoya Goule*	Great Britain; Eilidh Child; Shana Cox; Margaret Adeoye; Christine Ohuruogu; Victoria Ohuruogu*

*Athletes who competed in heats only.

== Records ==
Standing records prior to the 2014 IAAF World Indoor Championships
World record	Russia (RUS)	3:23.37	Glasgow, Great Britain	28 January 2006
Championship record	Russia (RUS)	3:23.88	Budapest, Hungary	7 March 2004
World Leading	University of Oregon	3:30.08	Albuquerque, United States	15 February 2014
Asian record	India (IND)	3:37.46	Doha, Qatar	16 February 2008
European record	Russia (RUS)	3:23.37	Glasgow, Great Britain	28 January 2006
North and Central American and Caribbean record	United States (USA)	3:27.34	Doha, Qatar	14 March 2010
Oceanian Record	Australia (AUS)	3:26.87	Maebashi, Japan	7 March 1999
Records broken during the 2014 IAAF World Indoor Championships
World Leading	United States (USA)	3:29.06	Sopot, Poland	8 March 2014
World Leading	United States (USA)	3:24.83	Sopot, Poland	9 March 2014

== Schedule ==
Date	Time	Round
8 March 2014	12:20	Heats
9 March 2014	17:45	Final

== Results ==
=== Heats ===
Qualification: First 2 in each heat (Q) and the next 2 fastest (q) qualified for the final.

Rank	Heat	Country	Athletes	Time	Notes
1	2	United States	Natasha Hastings, Jernail Hayes, Monica Hargrove, Cassandra Tate	3:29.06	Q, WL
2	2	Jamaica	Verone Chambers, Anneisha McLaughlin, Natoya Goule, Stephanie McPherson	3:29.43	Q, NR
3	2	Poland	Ewelina Ptak, Patrycja Wyciszkiewicz, Joanna Linkiewicz, Małgorzata Hołub	3:29.48	q, SB
4	2	Nigeria	Omolara Omotoso, Patience Okon George, Bukola Abogunloko, Folashade Abugan	3:29.67	q, AR
5	1	Great Britain	Eilidh Child, Shana Cox, Victoria Ohuruogu, Christine Ohuruogu	3:30.60	Q, SB
6	1	Russia	Olga Tovarnova, Irina Davydova, Yuliya Terekhova, Natalya Nazarova	3:30.87	Q, SB
7	1	Italy	Maria Enrica Spacca, Elena Maria Bonfanti, Marta Milani, Chiara Bazzoni	3:31.99	NR
8	1	Romania	Adelina Pastor, Alina Andreea Panainte, Sanda Belgyan, Bianca Răzor	3:38.18	SB

=== Final ===
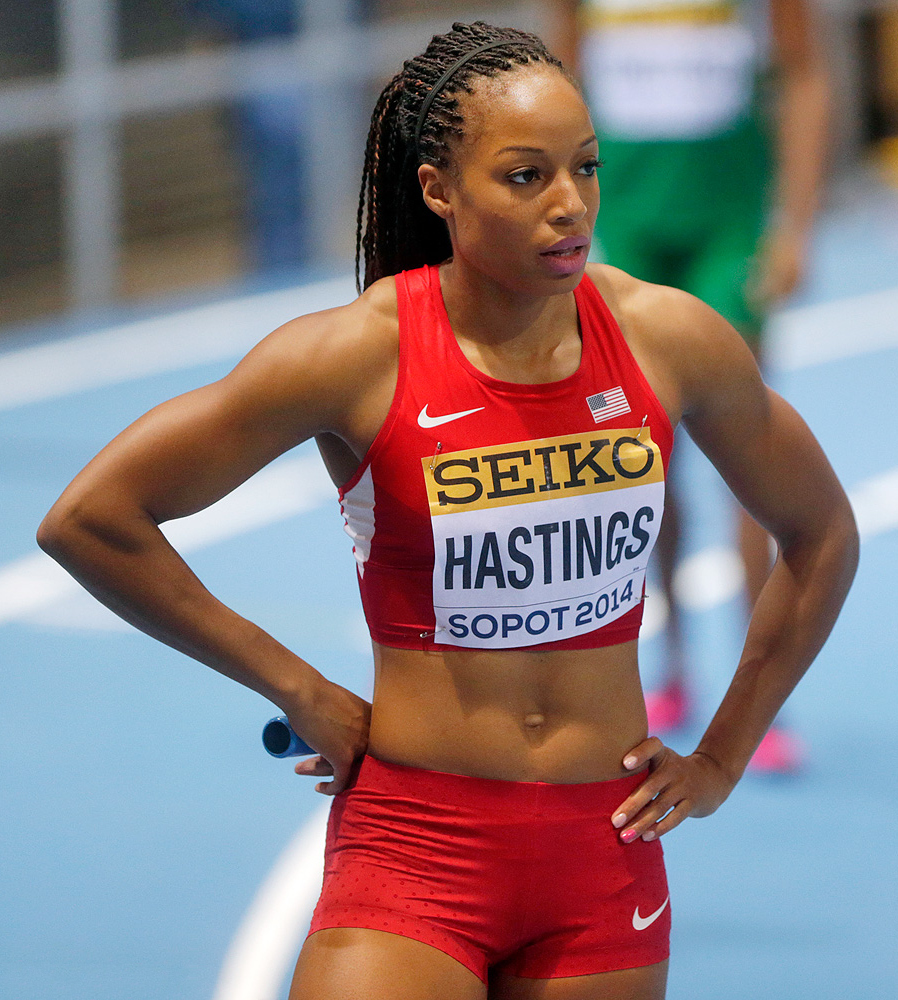
Natasha Hastings of the winning US team.

Rank	Country	Athletes	Time	Notes
1st place, gold medalist(s)	United States	Natasha Hastings, Joanna Atkins, Francena McCorory, Cassandra Tate	3:24.83	WL, NR
2nd place, silver medalist(s)	Jamaica	Patricia Hall, Anneisha McLaughlin, Kaliese Spencer, Stephanie McPherson	3:26.54	NR
3rd place, bronze medalist(s)	Great Britain	Eilidh Child, Shana Cox, Margaret Adeoye, Christine Ohuruogu	3:27.90	SB
DQ	Russia	Olga Tovarnova, Alena Tamkova, Yuliya Terekhova, Kseniya Ryzhova	~~3:28.39~~	~~SB~~
4	Poland	Ewelina Ptak, Małgorzata Hołub, Patrycja Wyciszkiewicz, Justyna Święty	3:29.89	
5	Nigeria	Omolara Omotoso, Folashade Abugan, Bukola Abogunloko, Patience Okon George	3:31.59	
