= 2013 European Athletics Indoor Championships – Women's 4 × 400 metres relay =

The Women's 4 × 400 metres relay race at the 2013 European Athletics Indoor Championships was held on March 3, 2013, in Gothenburg.

== Records ==
Standing records prior to the 2011 European Athletics Indoor Championships
World record	Russia (RUS)	3:23.37	Glasgow, United Kingdom	28 January 2006
European record	Russia (RUS)	3:23.37	Glasgow, United Kingdom	28 January 2006
Championship record	Belarus (BLR)	3:27.83	Birmingham, United Kingdom	4 March 2007
World Leading	University of Arkansas	3:35.20	New York, United States	2 February 2013
European Leading				

=== Final ===
The final was held at 18:30.

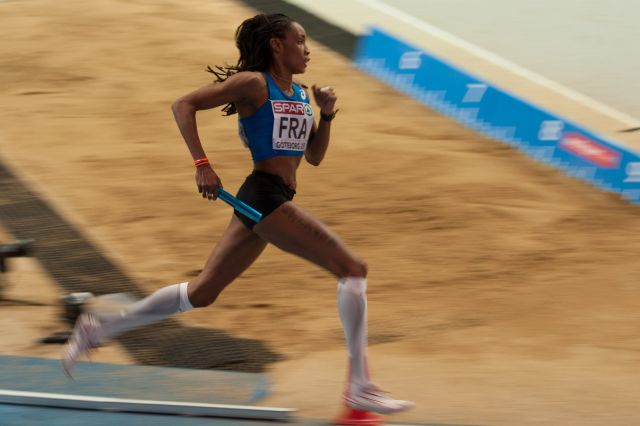
Phara Anacharsis of France during the race.

Position	Nationality	Runners	Time	Notes
1st place, gold medalist(s)	Great Britain	Eilidh Child; Shana Cox; Christine Ohuruogu; Perri Shakes-Drayton	3:27.56	WL, NR, CR
2nd place, silver medalist(s)	Russia	Olga Tovarnova; Tatyana Veshkurova; Nadezhda Kotlyarova; Kseniya Zadorina	3:28.18	SB
3rd place, bronze medalist(s)	Czech Republic	Denisa Rosolová; Jitka Bartoničková; Lenka Masná; Zuzana Hejnová	3:28.49	SB
4	France	Myriam Soumaré; Muriel Hurtis; Phara Anacharsis; Marie Gayot	3:28.71	NR
5	Ukraine	Yuliya Krasnoshchok; Olha Bibik; Kseniya Karandyuk; Olha Zemlyak	3:34.61	SB
6	Sweden	Josefin Magnusson; Moa Hjelmer; Frida Persson; Elin Moraiti	3:36.17	SB
