= Sanya Richards-Ross =

American sprinter (born 1985)

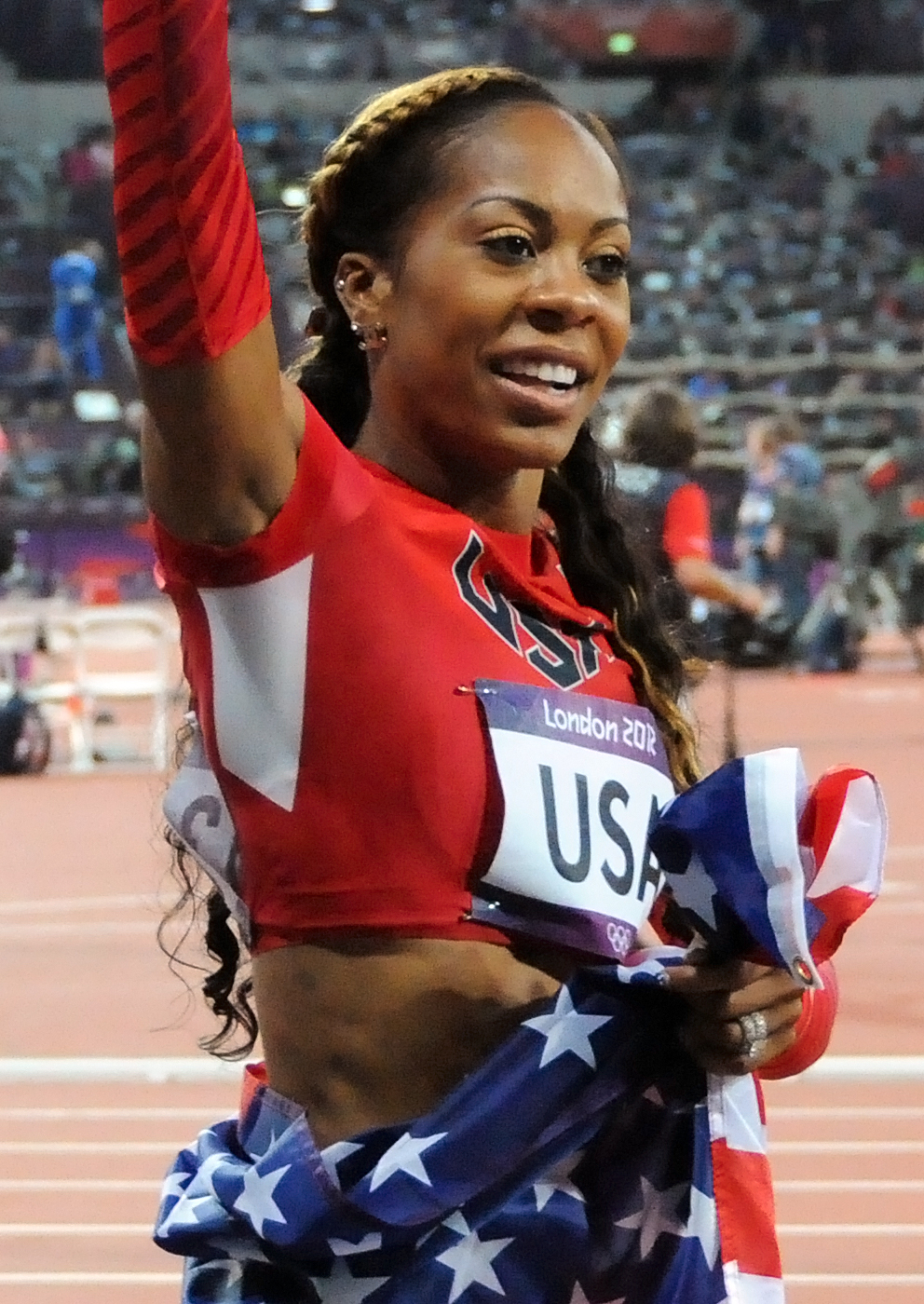
- Richards-Ross at the 2012 Summer Olympics

Personal information
- Born: Sanya Richards; February 26, 1985 (age 41) Kingston, Jamaica
- Height: 5 ft 8 in (1.73 m)
- Weight: 137 lb (62 kg)
- Spouse: Aaron Ross (m. 2010)

Sport
- Country: United States
- Sport: Track and field
- Event: 400 m

Achievements and titles
- Personal bests: 100 m: 10.97 (Shanghai 2007); 200 m: 22.09 (New York 2009); 400 m: 48.70 (Athens 2006); Indoors; 200 m: 22.49 (Fayetteville 2004); 400 m: 50.71 (Albuquerque 2012)
Medal record
Women's athletics
Representing United States
Event	1st	2nd	3rd
Olympic Games	4	0	1
World Championships	5	2	0
World Indoor Championships	1	1	0
Total	10	3	1
Olympic Games
Gold medal – first place	2004 Athens	4 × 400 m relay
Gold medal – first place	2008 Beijing	4 × 400 m relay
Gold medal – first place	2012 London	400 m
Gold medal – first place	2012 London	4 × 400 m relay
Bronze medal – third place	2008 Beijing	400 m
World Championships
Gold medal – first place	2003 Paris	4 × 400 m relay
Gold medal – first place	2007 Osaka	4 × 400 m relay
Gold medal – first place	2009 Berlin	400 m
Gold medal – first place	2009 Berlin	4 × 400 m relay
Gold medal – first place	2011 Daegu	4 × 400 m relay
Silver medal – second place	2005 Helsinki	400 m
Silver medal – second place	2015 Beijing	4 × 400 m relay
World Indoor Championships
Gold medal – first place	2012 Istanbul	400 m
Silver medal – second place	2012 Istanbul	4 × 400 m relay
World Relays
Gold medal – first place	2014 Nassau	4 × 400 m relay
Gold medal – first place	2015 Nassau	Distance medley relay
Gold medal – first place	2015 Nassau	4 × 400 m relay

Sanya Richards-Ross (née Richards; born February 26, 1985) is a retired American track and field athlete who competed internationally for the United States in the 400-meter sprint. Her notable accolades in this event include being the 2012 Olympic champion, 2009 world champion, 2008 Olympic bronze medalist, and 2005 world silver medalist. With her victory in 2012, she became the second American woman to win the 400 meters at the Olympic Games and the first American woman to earn multiple global 400-meter titles. At this distance, Richards-Ross is also a six-time U.S. national champion (2003, 2005, 2006, 2008, 2009, and 2012).

A formidable competitor throughout her career, Richards-Ross ranked number one in the world from 2005 to 2009 and again in 2012 in the 400 meters. She set the then American 400-meter record of 48.70 seconds in 2006 and was named the IAAF 2006 Female World Athlete of the Year, an honor she received again in 2009. Richards-Ross also holds the record for the most sub-50 second sprints in the history of the event, with a career total of 49 times. In addition to her individual achievements, she won three consecutive Olympic gold medals in the 4 × 400 meters relay at the 2004, 2008, and 2012 Summer Olympics, as well as five total relay medals from multiple World Athletics Championships.

Following an injury at the 2016 U.S. Olympic trials, Richards-Ross retired from the sport and subsequently joined the NBC broadcasting team as a track and field analyst. She published her memoir Chasing Grace: What the Quarter Mile has Taught Me about God and Life in 2017.

In October 2021, Bravo announced that Richards-Ross was joining the fourteenth season of The Real Housewives of Atlanta, departing after the fifteenth season.

== Early life ==
Richards-Ross was born on February 26, 1985, in Kingston, Jamaica to Archie and Sharon Richards. She began running at the age of seven and represented her school Vaz Prep in annual youth championships. When she was twelve years old, her family immigrated to Fort Lauderdale, Florida, so that she could attend an American high school, increasing her chances of obtaining an athletic scholarship to an American university. She later became a naturalized citizen of the United States.

At St. Thomas Aquinas High School in Fort Lauderdale, she was a nine-time individual Florida high school state champion with four 100-meter titles, three 200-meter titles, one 400-meter title and one long jump title. On June 20, 2002, Richards ran the 400m in 50.69 seconds at the U.S. Junior Championships at Stanford University, the fastest high school time ever recorded in that event and still standing in 2025.

She graduated from Aquinas in 2002 with a cumulative 4.0 GPA and was named the 2002 Gatorade National High School Girls Track and Field Athlete of the Year and the USA Track and Field Youth Athlete of the Year. Richards-Ross attended the University of Texas, Austin from 2002 to 2005, majoring in business and starring on the women's track and field team.

== Career ==
=== 2003–2005 ===
Representing the University of Texas in 2003, Richards-Ross became the first freshman to win the NCAA national championship in the 400 meters and the 4 × 400 meters relay. Her victory in 400 meters set the then American U20 record of 50.58 seconds. Later that June, at eighteen years old, the freshman Longhorn claimed her first senior national title by winning the 400 meters in 51.01 seconds at the 2003 U.S. national championships and qualified for the 2003 Paris World Championships. In Paris, she finished fourth in her 400 meters semi-final and did not move on to the final. However, Richards-Ross still came home with a gold medal in the 4 × 400 meters relay after anchoring Team USA to a victory.

Richards-Ross qualified for her first Olympic team by running 49.89 seconds to place second in the 400 meters at the 2004 U.S. Olympic trials. In the 2004 Olympic 400 meters final, Richards-Ross finished sixth with a time of 50.19 seconds, behind her two American compatriots DeeDee Trotter and Monique Hennagan, who both missed the podium as well. The American women sought redemption from their disappointing run by winning gold in the 4 × 400 meters relay, days later. After leaving Athens, Richards-Ross forwent her college eligibility at Texas, competing as a Nike-sponsored athlete and training under the then head track and field coach of Baylor University, Clyde Hart.

At the 2005 Helsinki World Championships, 20-year-old Richards-Ross failed to maintain the lead coming off the second curve in the 400 meters final and was passed by the 2004 Olympic champion Tonique Williams-Darling of the Bahamas, who won with a season's best of 49.55 seconds. Richards-Ross attributed the difficult loss to her inexperience as a young professional athlete, fixating on beating her main competitor before the final 100 meters instead of trusting her established race strategy. Reverting to her predetermined race plan, she dipped under 49 seconds for the first time with a personal best of 48.92 seconds, the fastest time in the world that year, in Zürich, a race that also featured the newly crowned world champion Williams-Darling.

=== 2006–2008 ===
Pursuit of the American 400 meters record, set at 48.83 seconds by Valerie Brisco-Hooks, became Richards-Ross' goal of the 2006 season. Leading into the World Cup race in Athens, the American woman was on a dominant win-streak and held the world-leading time of 49.05 seconds. She finished the World Cup race in 48.70 seconds, replacing Brisco-Hooks as the new American record holder in the 400 meters. At the time, this personal best ranked her as the seventh-fastest woman ever at the distance. Richards-Ross and her training partner Jeremy Wariner were awarded the 2006 Jesse Owens Award by USA Track and Field after both were undefeated for the entire season and each won their $250,000 portion of the IAAF Golden League. Athletes who win all six Golden League meets in an event claim a share of the $1 million jackpot.

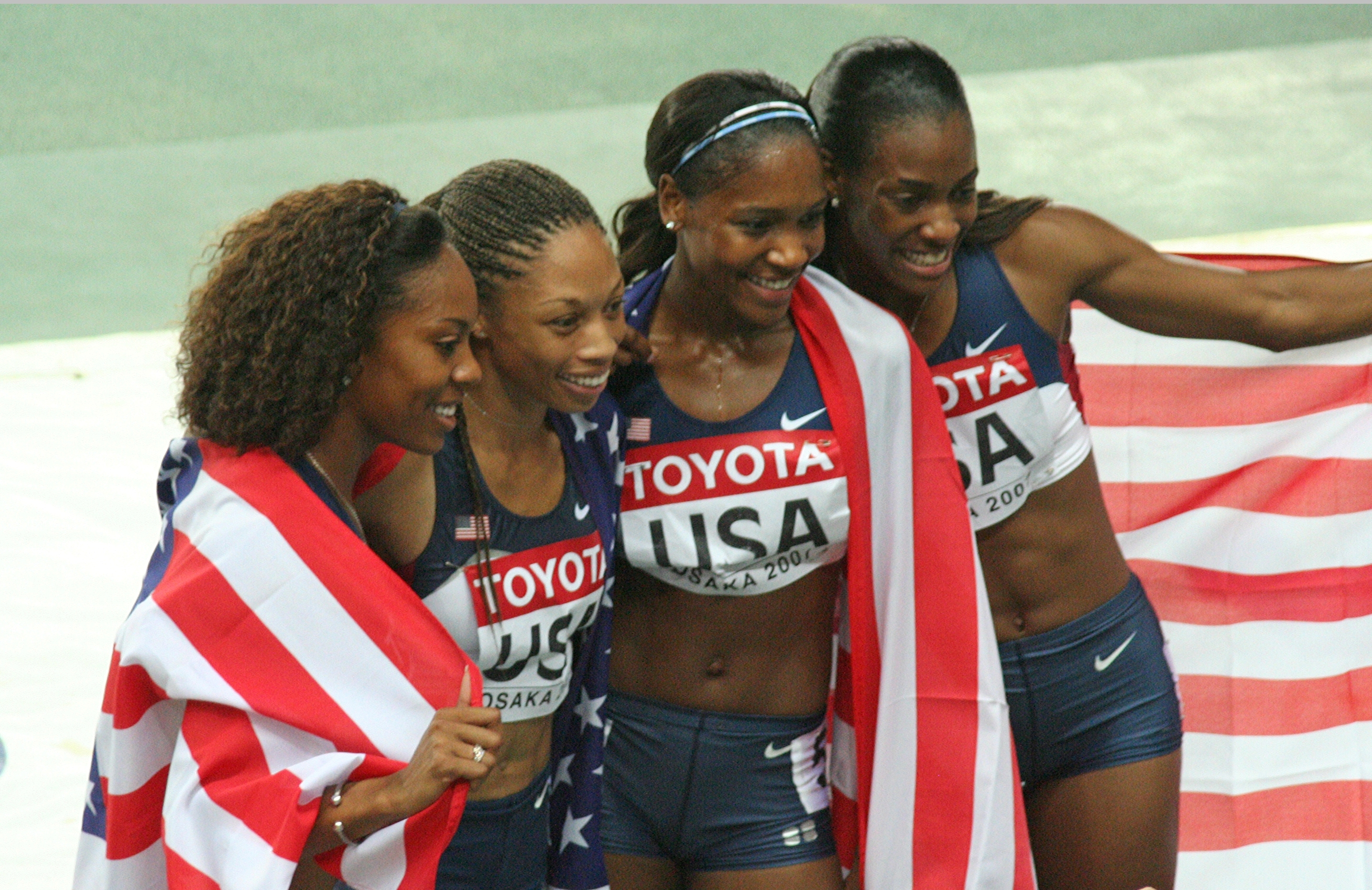
Richards-Ross with the U.S. relay team at the 2007 Osaka World Championships

For the 2007 season, Richards-Ross decided to expand her résumé, racing more 200-meter sprints and testing her ability to possibly pursue the rare 200–400 meters double Olympic victory in Beijing the following year. Only a handful of athletes have ever achieved such a feat, including Michael Johnson, her coach Clyde Hart's world-record-setting pupil. Things strayed from her plan, as she finished fourth in the 400 meters event at the 2007 U.S. national championships, only qualifying for the 2007 Osaka World Championships by placing second in the 200 meters, behind reigning 200 meters world champion Allyson Felix. In Osaka, Richards-Ross ran 22.70 seconds to finish fifth, as teammate Felix successfully defended her title from two years prior. Both American women reunited for the women's 4 × 400 meters relay, helping Team USA win gold, ahead of the Jamaican team and the British team, which featured the new 400 meters world champion Christine Ohuruogu and 400 meters silver medalist Nicola Sanders. Despite failing to qualify in her signature event at the national championships and leaving Osaka with only a spectator's memory of the individual race, the 23-year-old American woman still finished the year undefeated in the six Golden League 400-meter races and with the number one world ranking. Reflecting on her season, she admitted that losing focus on the quarter-mile race was the reason for her defeat, after constantly shifting mindsets and strategies to race the 100, 200, and 400 meters throughout the season.

Coming into 2008, despite being among the most prolific sub-50 second 400-meter sprinters of the decade, Richards-Ross had yet to win any individual world or Olympic title. Up until then, she had run a total of 27 races below the 50-second barrier. After winning the 2008 U.S. Olympic trials, Richards-Ross was favored to win gold at the 2008 Beijing Olympics. However, in Beijing, Richards-Ross faltered, coming off the curve with a significant lead and having nothing left to come home. She held on for the bronze medal as Christine Ohuruogu of Great Britain and Shericka Williams of Jamaica surged ahead. Richards-Ross later avenged her individual loss by making up a ten-meter deficit in the women's 4 × 400 meters relay and catching the Russian sprinter on the anchor leg right before the finish line, allowing the United States to win by a 0.28-second margin.

Throughout her career, Richards-Ross answered questions regarding the 2008 Olympic 400 meters race with self-described half-truths, attributing her loss to a sudden right hamstring injury, lack of sleep, or fate. In her 2017 memoir Chasing Grace: What the Quarter Mile Taught Me about God and Life, she finally revealed the underlying reason for her disappointing loss at the 2008 Olympics; one month before the games, Richards-Ross discovered that she was pregnant and decided to terminate the pregnancy the day before leaving for Beijing. A devout Christian woman and a world-class athlete at the prime of her career, she endured much physical and emotional turmoil following her difficult decision, even into the 2008 Olympics, as explicated in the book: "I made a decision that broke me, and one from which I would not immediately heal from. Abortion would now forever be a part of my life. A scarlet letter I never thought I'd wear."

=== 2009–2011 ===
With the echoes of her Beijing loss still lingering into 2009, Richards-Ross began working with a sports psychologist, at the urging of coach Clyde Hart, to overcome her bouts of anxiety and emotional anguish. Her efforts on the track coupled with her mental preparation made a difference as the 2009 season became her most successful to date. Richards-Ross won the 400 meters U.S. national title in 50.05 seconds, 0.74 seconds over second-place finisher Debbie Dunn, and qualified for the 2009 Berlin World Championships. In Berlin, she won her first global 400 meters title by dominating the 400 meters final from start to finish, winning in 49.00 seconds and proving to her critics that she could perform on the sport's biggest stages. The newly crowned world champion then anchored Team USA to a gold medal in the women's 4 × 400 meters relay. The winning time of 3.17.83 minutes was the sixth-fastest time in history, up until then, with Richards-Ross unofficially splitting 48.43 seconds on her anchor leg.

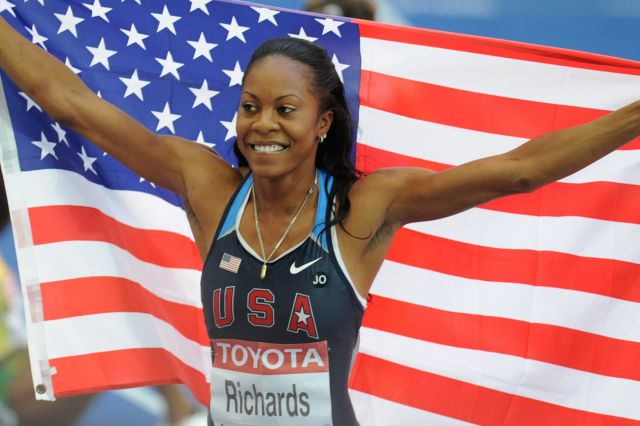
Richards-Ross celebrating her victory at the 2009 Berlin World Championships

Upon leaving Berlin, Richards-Ross returned to the track to continue her 2009 IAAF Golden League win streak. In addition to winning the Berlin meet in 49.57 seconds, Oslo in 49.23 seconds, Rome in 49.46 seconds, and Paris in 49.34 seconds, all before the world championships, she claimed victory again in the last two Golden League meets in Zürich and Brussels, with times of 48.94 seconds and 48.83 seconds, respectively. This was her third time sweeping the IAAF Golden League meets, a feat she accomplished in 2006 and 2007 as well, allowing her to once again earn a share of the $1 million jackpot. After a 49.95-second win in the 400 meters IAAF World Athletics Final meet, she broke Marita Koch's record for the most career sub-50 second performances, surpassing Koch's total of 35 with her own total of 41. Her only defeat this season, in any event, was to the now three-time defending 200-meter world champion Allyson Felix at the IAAF World Athletics Final in the 200 meters, with the victor discerned via photo finish and Richards-Ross declared second in an identical time of 22.29 seconds. To cap off the successful season, the 24-year-old American woman, along with Usain Bolt, were named the 2009 IAAF World Athlete of Year.

The next two outdoor seasons, however, proved to be difficult and disappointing for the defending world champion. A quad injury right before the 2010 Penn Relays forced Richards-Ross to prematurely end her 2010 season to rest and regroup. She bounced back in 2011 to run a 49.66-second 400 meters race at the London Diamond League meet, just prior to the 2011 Daegu World Championships, sparking some optimism of rounding back into top form in time for the major competition. In Daegu, Richards-Ross struggled to find her rhythm as she narrowly qualified for the 400 meters final and then wound up seventh in a time of 51.32 seconds. She later returned in the 4 × 400 meters relay, this time running the lead-off leg in 49.1 seconds and setting the U.S. women up for victory.

=== 2012 ===
==== Road to London ====
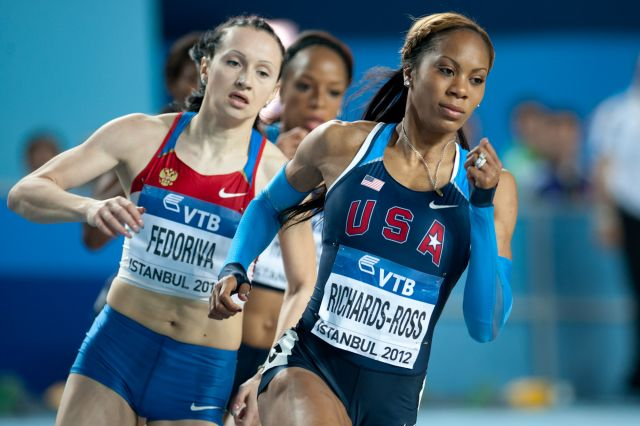
Richards-Ross racing at the 2012 Istanbul World Indoor Championships

Healthy and well-rested, Richards-Ross began her 2012 quest for the coveted individual Olympic gold medal by racing a full indoor schedule to warm up for her outdoor debut. With four wins in four indoor races under her belt coming into the 2012 IAAF World Indoor Championships, she secured a resounding 400-meter victory in Istanbul with a time of 50.79 seconds, 0.97 seconds ahead of the Russian runner-up. Her first indoor world title ushered in some much-needed confidence as the outdoor season began. Richards-Ross decisively won the 400-meter final at the 2012 U.S. Olympic trials, tying the Olympic trials record of 49.28 seconds and earning a berth to her third consecutive Olympics. Longtime teammate DeeDee Trotter and the 2011 world bronze medalist Francena McCorory finished second and third, respectively, and joined her on the 400 meters team. Later at the trials, Richards-Ross also finished third in the 200-meter sprint in 22.22 seconds, allowing her to attempt the rare 200 meter-400 meter double at the 2012 London Olympics.

Once again, heading into the Olympic Games as the 400-meter favorite, she shouldered the same pressure and expectations, but this time, Richards-Ross was prepared to maintain her serenity amidst the vortex. Stiff competition lined up for the 400 meters final in London, including the defending 2008 Olympic champion Christine Ohuruogu of Great Britain, 2011 world champion Amantle Montsho of Botswana, and Antonina Krivoshapka of Russia, who held the world-leading time of 49.16 seconds. From the sound of the gun, Richards-Ross executed a race opposite of the one four years ago, pushing hard out of the blocks before relaxing into a comfortable stride down the backstretch and entering the homestretch in the third position, behind Krivoshapka and DeeDee Trotter. The U.S. champion willed her legs to pull ahead of the field with fifty meters left of the race and in the final moments, which almost mirrored the 2008 race in Beijing as Ohuruogu closed down quickly on the leading American, Richards-Ross held on to win in 49.55 seconds, finally earning the gold medal that had long eluded her. This victory became the first time an American woman had won the event in 28 years, since Valerie Brisco-Hooks in 1984. Despite a fifth-place finish later in the 200 meters final, the newly crowned Olympic champion concluded the Games by running 49.1 seconds on the anchor leg of the victorious U.S. women's 4 × 400 meters relay team and left London with two gold medals.

==== Opposition to Rule 40 ====
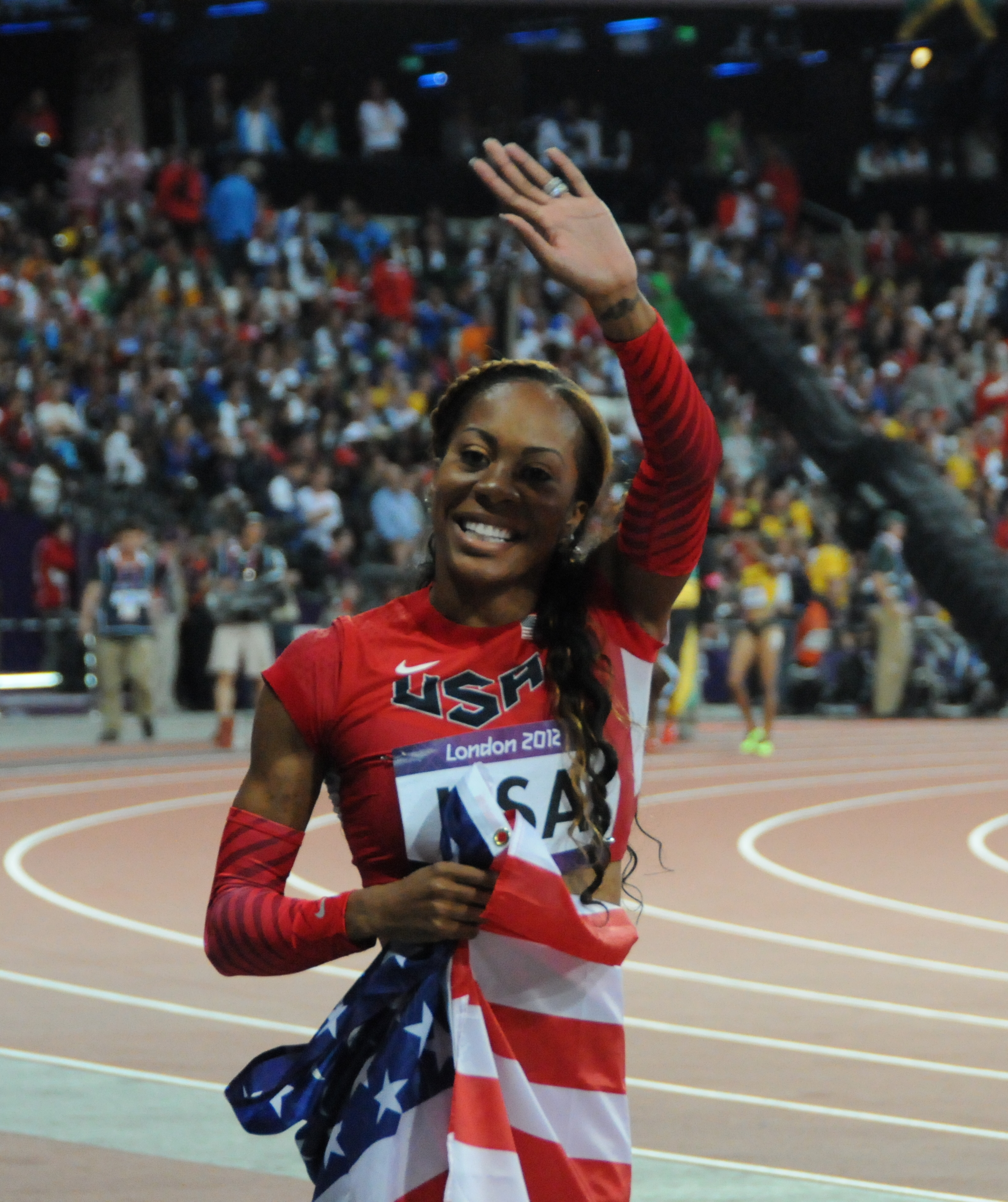
Richards-Ross celebrating at the 2012 Olympic Games

Throughout the Olympic season, Richards-Ross had appeared at the forefront of an athlete-driven #WeDemandChange movement advocating against the International Olympic Committee's (IOC) controversial Rule 40, a regulation that forbids Olympic athletes and coaches from acknowledging personal, non-Olympic sponsors by name, wearing additional logos on apparel, or promoting them on social media two weeks before or during the Olympic Games. The rule strived to prevent ambush marketing and concentrate viewer attention on messages from official Olympic sponsors, such as Coca-Cola and Visa, which had paid a hefty amount for exclusive partnerships with the Games, although none of the multi-billion dollar revenue trickled into athletes' pockets. Prior to the London Olympics, she sparked a discussion on the topic, tweeting, "With $6 billion exchanging hands during the Olympics why do the athletes compete for free?!? #QuestionsThatNeedAnswers #WeDemandChange." Since track and field professionals earn the vast majority of their income through sponsorship deals, Rule 40 prevents them from thanking personal sponsors for their endorsement and also dissuades potential non-Olympic sponsors from investing in these athletes when the sport is receiving the most attention.

Starting on July 29, 2012, a group of U.S. track and field athletes, including Trey Hardee, Bernard Lagat, Nick Symmonds, and Dawn Harper-Nelson, coordinated a Twitter campaign to criticize the restriction on athletes' rights, posting messages with hashtags #WeDemandChange, #Rule40, and #WeDemandChange2012. Richards-Ross spoke at a news conference regarding the #WeDemandChange campaign on the following day and explained that although she was fortunate to have secured major sponsorships to continue her training and treatment, many athletes have to work two or three jobs to be able to afford to stay in the sport. Answering conference reporters, she said, "I’ve been very fortunate to do very well around the Olympics, but so many of my peers struggle in the sport, and I think it's unjust that they're not being considered, that athletes are not part of the conversation." At the Olympic Village in London, Richards-Ross helped organize a group of track and field athletes to share their concerns, further their message to the IOC, and discuss potential regulation amendments to accommodate the athletes, with several options including permission to post sponsors on social media, clearance to wear non-Olympic sponsor logos, and IOC-funded prize money. Efforts by these track and field athletes, along with later campaigns voicing Olympic athletes' discontent, finally pushed to the IOC to slightly amend Rule 40 for the 2020 Tokyo Olympics, allowing athletes to promote personal sponsors and appear in their advertisements during the Games, within specific guidelines.

=== 2015–Retirement ===
Following two surgeries to correct a persistent toe problem, Richards-Ross injured her calf muscle right before the 2015 U.S. national championships, which lead her to finish fifth in her semi-final and prevent her from qualifying for the 2015 Beijing World Championships. Despite not making the individual team, the track veteran was still selected to be on the women's 4 × 400 meters relay in Beijing. There, she ran a 51.5-second leg to help the United States team win silver. Richards-Ross admitted later that overtraining, as she was approaching the closing stages of her career, might have contributed to the rapid decline in the latter part of the season.

2016 began with the official announcement of her retirement by the end of the track season. Still in recovery from a third toe surgery, the reigning 400-meter Olympic champion suffered an injury to her right hamstring at the 2016 U.S. Olympic trials, prompting her to discontinue the race and salute the Hayward Field crowd one last time. Shortly after retiring, Richards-Ross joined the NBC broadcasting team as a track and field analyst for major events, such as the 2016, 2020, and 2024 Summer Olympics.

In 2026, Richards-Ross was inducted as a member of the USATF National Track and Field Hall of Fame.

== Personal life ==
While attending the University of Texas, Richards-Ross began dating Longhorn football cornerback Aaron Ross, who later won two Super Bowls with the New York Giants of the NFL. The two were engaged in 2007 and married in 2010. Their wedding was featured on an episode of Platinum Weddings. The pair welcomed their first child, Aaron Jermaine Ross II, in 2017, and announced in July 2023 that they were expecting their second child, later revealed to be a boy in September 2023. On February 23, 2025, the couple expecting their third child together. On July 2, 2025, they welcomed their third son.

For five years, Richards-Ross suffered from severe onsets of mouth ulcers, joint aches, and full-body skin lesions, which in 2007, doctors initially thought were caused by a rare, chronic disease involving the inflammation of blood vessels called Behçet's disease. She began donning compression arm sleeves in competition to hide her ulcerated skin, but as a fashion enthusiast, later embraced the extra garment as part of her trademark look.

Exploring new opportunities off the track, in 2013, Richards-Ross premiered her WE tv reality TV show Glam and Gold, a docu-series that followed her as she juggled appearances, ran businesses, trained for the track season, and balanced life with her husband and family. Primarily shot at their home in Austin, the series also visited Florida, New York, and Jamaica, where she took Team SRR for an Olympic victory lap and celebration.

She briefly appeared in the music video of Busta Rhymes 2008 remix of his song Arab Money

== Achievements ==
=== Competition record ===
Year	Competition	Venue	Position	Event	Result
Representing the United States
2002	World Junior Championships	Kingston, Jamaica	3rd	200 m	23.09 (wind: -0.2 m/s)
2002	World Junior Championships	Kingston, Jamaica	2nd	400 m	51.49
2002	World Junior Championships	Kingston, Jamaica	3rd (h)	4 × 400 m relay	3:35.84
2003	World Championships	Paris, France	11th (sf)	400 m	51.32
2003	World Championships	Paris, France	1st	4 × 400 m relay	3:22.63
2004	Olympic Games	Athens, Greece	6th	400 m	50.19
2004	Olympic Games	Athens, Greece	1st	4 × 400 m relay	3:19.01
2005	World Championships	Helsinki, Finland	2nd	400 m	49.74
2005	World Athletics Final	Monaco	1st	400 m	49.52
2006	World Indoor Championships	Moscow, Russia	9th (sf)	400 m	52.46
2006	World Athletics Final	Stuttgart, Germany	2nd	200 m	22.17
2006	World Athletics Final	Stuttgart, Germany	1st	400 m	49.25
2006	World Cup	Athens, Greece	1st	400 m	48.70
2006	World Cup	Athens, Greece	1st	200 m	22.23
2007	World Championships	Osaka, Japan	5th	200 m	22.70
2007	World Championships	Osaka, Japan	1st	4 × 400 m relay	3:18.55
2008	Olympic Games	Beijing, China	3rd	400 m	49.93
2008	Olympic Games	Beijing, China	1st	4 × 400 m relay	3:18.54
2009	World Championships	Berlin, Germany	1st	400 m	49.00
2009	World Championships	Berlin, Germany	1st	4 × 400 m relay	3:17.83
2011	World Championships	Daegu, South Korea	7th	400 m	51.32
2011	World Championships	Daegu, South Korea	1st	4 × 400 m relay	3:18.09
2012	World Indoor Championships	Istanbul, Turkey	1st	400 m	50.79
2012	World Indoor Championships	Istanbul, Turkey	2nd	4 × 400 m relay	3:28.79
2012	Olympic Games	London, United Kingdom	5th	200 m	22.39
2012	Olympic Games	London, United Kingdom	1st	400 m	49.55
2012	Olympic Games	London, United Kingdom	1st	4 × 400 m relay	3:16.88
2014	World Relay Championships	Nassau, Bahamas	1st	4 × 400 m relay	3:21.73
2015	World Relay Championships	Nassau, Bahamas	1st	Distance medley relay	10:36.50 (WR)
2015	World Relay Championships	Nassau, Bahamas	1st	4 × 400 m relay	3:19.39
2015	World Championships	Beijing, China	2nd	4 × 400 m relay	3:19.44

=== National titles ===
- Six-time national 400 meters champion – 2003 (51.01), 2005 (49.28), 2006 (49.27), 2008 (49.89), 2009 (50.05), 2012 (49.28)

=== Personal bests ===
Event	Time (seconds)	Venue	Date
60 meters	7.21	Lincoln, Nebraska, United States	February 28, 2004
100 meters	10.97*	Shanghai, China	September 28, 2007
200 meters	22.09	New York City, USA	June 8, 2012
400 meters	48.70	Athens, Greece	September 16, 2006

- All information from World Athletics profile.

=== Diamond League wins ===
- 2011 – London (400 m)
- 2012 – Eugene (400 m), New York (200 m), Stockholm (400 m), Zurich (400 m)

== Awards ==
- World Athletics Awards

World Athlete of the Year (Women)：2006, 2009

Awards
Preceded by Alan Webb	USA Track & Field Youth Athlete of the Year; 2002	Succeeded by Jason Richardson
Preceded by (Russia) Yelena Isinbayeva	Women's Track & Field Athlete of the Year; 2006	Succeeded by (Ethiopia) Meseret Defar
Preceded by (Ethiopia) Tirunesh Dibaba	Women's Track & Field Athlete of the Year; 2009	Succeeded by (Croatia) Blanka Vlašić
