= Jernail Hayes =

American sprinter

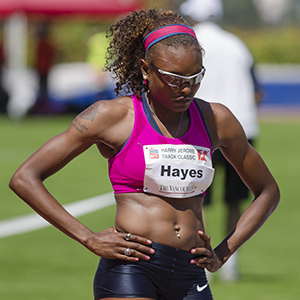

Personal information
- Born: July 8, 1988 (age 37)
Medal record
Athletics
Representing United States
World Indoor Championships
Gold medal – first place	2014 Sopot	4 × 400 m relay
Silver medal – second place	2012 Istanbul	4 × 400 m relay

Jernail Hayes (born July 8, 1988) is an American sprint athlete. She was part of the USA team that won the silver medal at the 2012 IAAF World Indoor Championships.

Hayes competed for the Seton Hall Pirates track and field team in the NCAA. She later became an assistant coach for the North Carolina Tar Heels track and field team.
