= 2012 IAAF World Indoor Championships =

14th IAAF World Indoor Championships
- Official competition logo
- Dates: 9–11 March
- Host city: Istanbul, Turkey
- Venue: Ataköy Athletics Arena
- Events: 26
- Participation: 629 athletes from 171 nations

The 2012 IAAF World Indoor Championships in Athletics was the 14th edition of the global-level indoor track and field competition and was held between March 9–11, 2012 at the Ataköy Athletics Arena in Istanbul, Turkey. It was the first of four IAAF World Athletics Series events in 2012, which includes the World Race Walking Cup, the World Junior Championships and the World Half Marathon Championships.

== Preparation ==
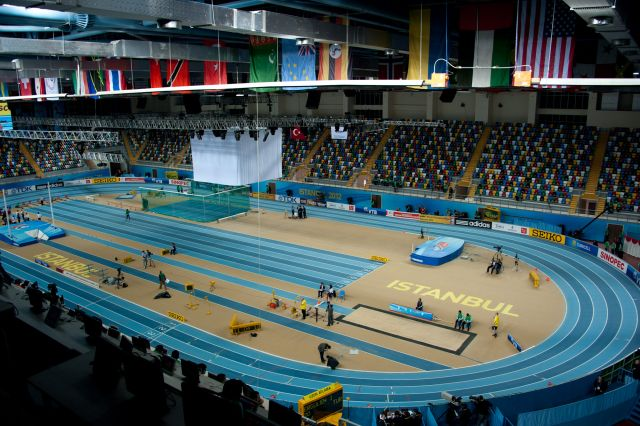
The Ataköy Athletics Arena.

The IAAF announced on March 25, 2007, at an IAAF Council meeting in Mombasa, Kenya that it had received bids from Turkey and Qatar to host the 2010 IAAF World Indoor Championships. In November 2007 at an IAAF Council meeting in Monaco, Doha was selected to host the 2010 edition, but due to the quality of the Istanbul bid, the Turkish city was chosen to host the following edition of the competition in 2012. It will be the first time that Turkey has hosted a major global athletics event. Previously, the highest level events that the country had hosted included the Athletics at the 2005 Summer Universiade and lower-level sections of the European Cup/European Team Championships.

The events took place at the 7,450-seater Ataköy Athletics Arena, which was constructed especially for the event in the Ataköy neighborhood of Bakırköy next to the Sinan Erdem Dome. The initial bid featured the Dome as the host stadium, but the venue was later changed as the Sinan Erdem Dome was host to the 2010 FIBA World Championship in the months before the event. The construction of the Ataköy Arena was behind schedule, leading to the cancellation of some tester events, meaning that the Turkish Indoor Championships in late January was the first competition to be held there.

== Schedule ==
Legend
Key	P	Q	H	½	F
Value	Preliminary round	Qualifiers	Heats	Semifinals	Final

All dates are EET (UTC+2)

Men
Date	Mar 9		Mar 10			Mar 11		
Event	M	A	M	A		M	A	
60 m		H		½	F			
400 m	H	½		F				
800 m	H						F	
1500 m	H			F				
3000 m		H					F	
60 m hurdles			H				½	F
4 × 400 m relay			H				F	
Long jump		Q		F				
Triple jump			Q				F	
High jump			Q				F	
Pole vault				F				
Shot put	Q	F						
Heptathlon	F							

Women
Date	Mar 9		Mar 10			Mar 11		
Event	M	A	M	A		M	A	
60 m			H				½	F
400 m	H	½		F				
800 m	H						F	
1500 m		H		F				
3000 m	H						F	
60 m hurdles		H		½	F			
4 × 400 m relay							F	
Long jump			Q				F	
Triple jump	Q			F				
High jump	Q			F				
Pole vault							F	
Shot put			Q	F				
Pentathlon	F							

== Results ==
=== Men ===
2008 | 2010 | 2012 | 2014 | 2016

Event	Gold		Silver		Bronze	
60 metres	Justin Gatlin; United States	6.46 SB	Nesta Carter; Jamaica	6.54	Dwain Chambers; Great Britain	6.60
400 metres	Nery Brenes; Costa Rica	45.11 CR, NR	Demetrius Pinder; Bahamas	45.34 SB	Chris Brown; Bahamas	45.90 SB
800 metres	Mohammed Aman; Ethiopia	1:48.36	Jakub Holuša; Czech Republic	1:48.62	Andrew Osagie; Great Britain	1:48.92
1500 metres	Abdalaati Iguider; Morocco	3:45.21	Ilham Tanui Özbilen; Turkey	3:45.35	Mekonnen Gebremedhin; Ethiopia	3:45.90
3000 metres	Bernard Lagat; United States	7:41.44 SB	Augustine Kiprono Choge; Kenya	7:41.77	Edwin Soi; Kenya	7:41.78
60 metres hurdles	Aries Merritt; United States	7.44	Liu Xiang; China	7.49	Pascal Martinot-Lagarde; France	7.53 PB
4 × 400 metres relay	United States; Frankie Wright; Calvin Smith Jr. Manteo Mitchell; Gil Roberts; Jamaal Torrance*; Quentin Iglehart-Summers*	3:03.94 SB	Great Britain; Conrad Williams; Nigel Levine; Michael Bingham; Richard Buck; Luke Lennon-Ford*	3:04.72 SB	Trinidad and Tobago; Lalonde Gordon; Renny Quow; Jereem Richards; Jarrin Solomon	3:06.85 NR
High jump	Dimitrios Chondrokoukis; Greece	2.33 PB	Andrey Silnov; Russia	2.33	Ivan Ukhov; Russia	2.31
Pole vault	Renaud Lavillenie; France	5.95 WL	Björn Otto; Germany	5.80	Brad Walker; United States	5.80
Long jump	Mauro Vinícius da Silva; Brazil	8.23	Henry Frayne; Australia	8.23 AR	Aleksandr Menkov; Russia	8.22
Triple jump	Will Claye; United States	17.70 WL	Christian Taylor; United States	17.63 SB	Lyukman Adams; Russia	17.36 PB
Shot put	Ryan Whiting; United States	22.00 WL	David Storl; Germany	21.88 PB	Tomasz Majewski; Poland	21.72 NR
Heptathlon	Ashton Eaton; United States	6645 WR	Oleksiy Kasyanov; Ukraine	6071	Artem Lukyanenko; Russia	5969
WR world record | AR area record | CR championship record | GR games record | NR national record | OR Olympic record | PB personal best | SB season best | WL world leading (in a given season)

=== Women ===
2008 | 2010 | 2012 | 2014 | 2016

Event	Gold		Silver		Bronze	
60 metres	Veronica Campbell-Brown; Jamaica	7.01 WL	Murielle Ahouré; Ivory Coast	7.04 NR	Tianna Bartoletta; United States	7.09
400 metres	Sanya Richards-Ross; United States	50.79	Aleksandra Fedoriva; Russia	51.76	Natasha Hastings; United States	51.82
800 metres	Pamela Jelimo; Kenya	1:58.83 WL	Nataliia Lupu; Ukraine	1:59.67 PB	Erica Moore; United States	1:59.97 PB
1500 metres	Genzebe Dibaba; Ethiopia	4:05.78	Mariem Alaoui Selsouli; Morocco	4:07.78	Hind Déhiba; France	4:10.30
3000 metres	Hellen Obiri; Kenya	8:37.16	Meseret Defar; Ethiopia	8:38.26	Gelete Burka; Ethiopia	8:40.18
60 metres hurdles	Sally Pearson; Australia	7.73 WL	Tiffany Porter; Great Britain	7.94	Alina Talay; Belarus	7.97 SB
4 × 400 metres relay	Great Britain; Shana Cox; Nicola Sanders; Christine Ohuruogu; Perri Shakes-Drayton	3:28.76 WL	United States; Leslie Cole; Natasha Hastings; Jernail Hayes; Sanya Richards-Ross	3:28.79 SB	Romania; Angela Moroșanu; Alina Panainte; Adelina Pastor; Elena Mirela Lavric	3:33.41 SB
High jump	Chaunté Lowe; United States	1.98	Antonietta Di Martino; Italy; Anna Chicherova; Russia; Ebba Jungmark; Sweden	1.95 SB 1.95 1.95 SB	Not awarded	
Pole vault	Yelena Isinbayeva; Russia	4.80	Vanessa Boslak; France	4.70 NR	Holly Bleasdale; United Kingdom	4.70
Long jump	Brittney Reese; United States	7.23 CR	Janay DeLoach; United States	6.98 SB	Shara Proctor; Great Britain	6.89 NR
Triple jump	Yamilé Aldama; Great Britain	14.82 SB	Olga Rypakova; Kazakhstan	14.63	Mabel Gay; Cuba	14.29
Shot put	Valerie Adams; New Zealand	20.54 AR	Michelle Carter; United States	19.58 SB	Jillian Camarena-Williams; United States	19.44
Pentathlon	Nataliya Dobrynska; Ukraine	5013 WR	Jessica Ennis; Great Britain	4965 NR	Austra Skujytė; Lithuania	4802 NR
WR world record | AR area record | CR championship record | GR games record | NR national record | OR Olympic record | PB personal best | SB season best | WL world leading (in a given season)

== Medal table ==
Rank	Nation	Gold	Silver	Bronze	Total
1	United States (USA)	10	4	5	19
2	Great Britain (GBR)	2	3	4	9
3	Ethiopia (ETH)	2	1	2	5
4	Kenya (KEN)	2	1	1	4
5	Russia (RUS)	1	3	4	8
6	Ukraine (UKR)	1	2	0	3
7	France (FRA)	1	1	2	4
8	Australia (AUS)	1	1	0	2
8	Jamaica (JAM)	1	1	0	2
8	Morocco (MAR)	1	1	0	2
11	Brazil (BRA)	1	0	0	1
11	Costa Rica (CRC)	1	0	0	1
11	Greece (GRE)	1	0	0	1
11	New Zealand (NZL)	1	0	0	1
15	Germany (GER)	0	2	0	2
16	Bahamas (BAH)	0	1	1	2
17	China (CHN)	0	1	0	1
17	Czech Republic (CZE)	0	1	0	1
17	Italy (ITA)	0	1	0	1
17	Ivory Coast (CIV)	0	1	0	1
17	Kazakhstan (KAZ)	0	1	0	1
17	Sweden (SWE)	0	1	0	1
17	Turkey (TUR)	0	1	0	1
24	Belarus (BLR)	0	0	1	1
24	Cuba (CUB)	0	0	1	1
24	Lithuania (LTU)	0	0	1	1
24	Poland (POL)	0	0	1	1
24	Romania (ROU)	0	0	1	1
24	Trinidad and Tobago (TRI)	0	0	1	1
Totals (29 entries)		26	28	25	79

== Gallery from the games ==
Photos from the games in Istanbul:

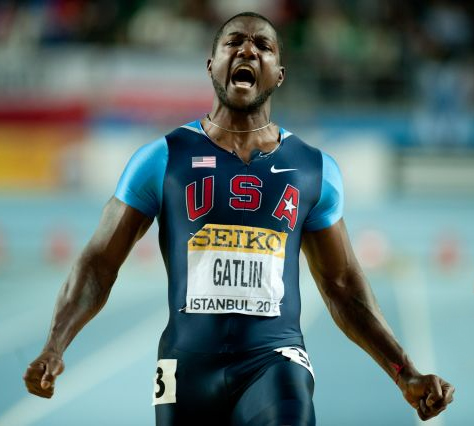
Justin Gatlin celebrating his win in the 60 metres.

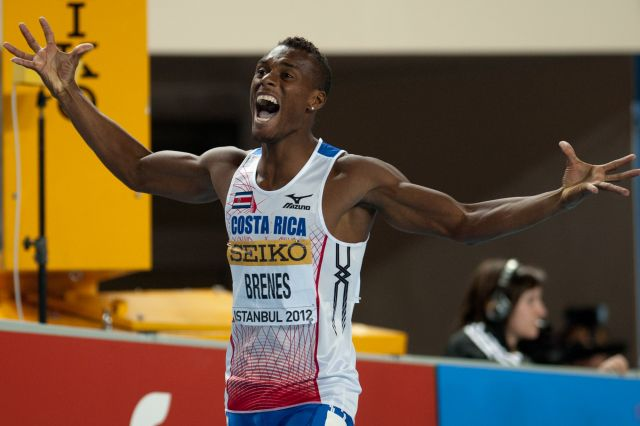
Nery Brenes celebrating his win after the 400 metres.

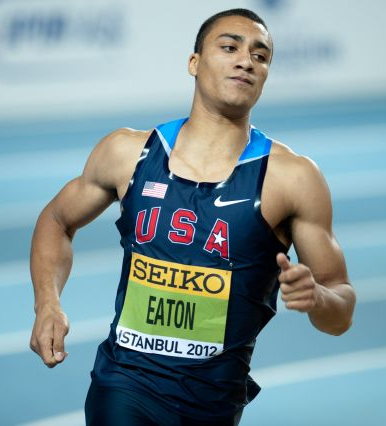
Ashton Eaton en route to victory in the heptathlon.

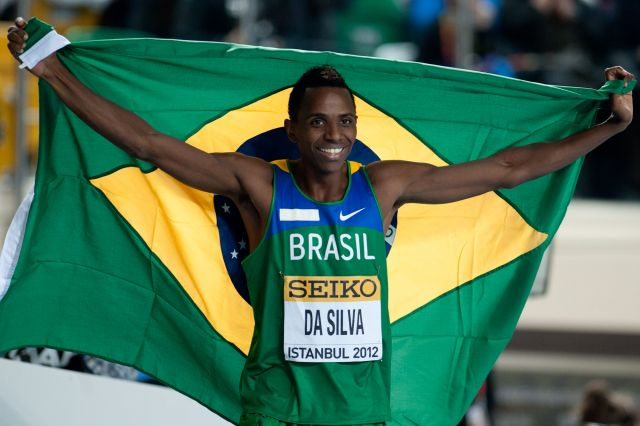
Mauro Vinícius da Silva celebrating his win after long jump.

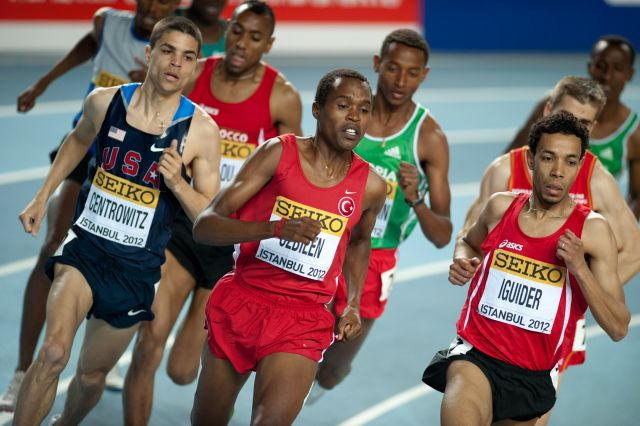
Abdalaati Iguider (far right) en route to victory in the 1500 metres.

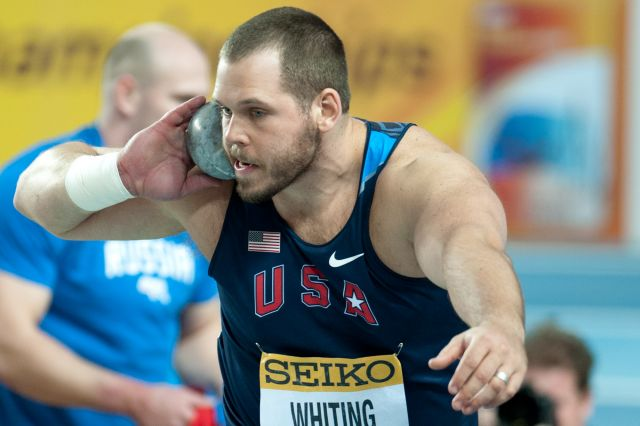
Ryan Whiting during the shot put in which he won gold.

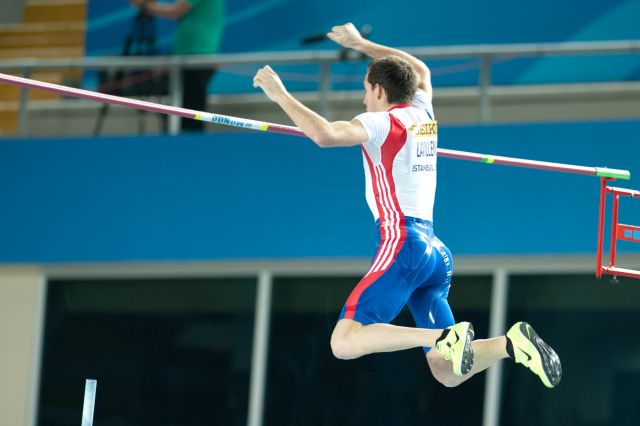
Renaud Lavillenie during the pole vault in which he won gold.

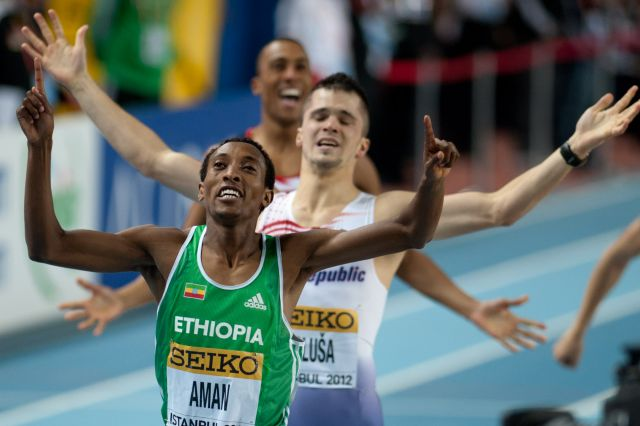
Mohammed Aman celebrating his win after finishing the 800 metres.

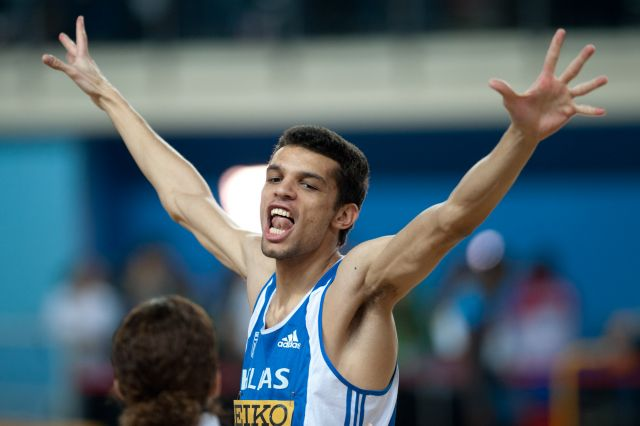
Dimitrios Chondrokoukis celebrating his win in the high jump.

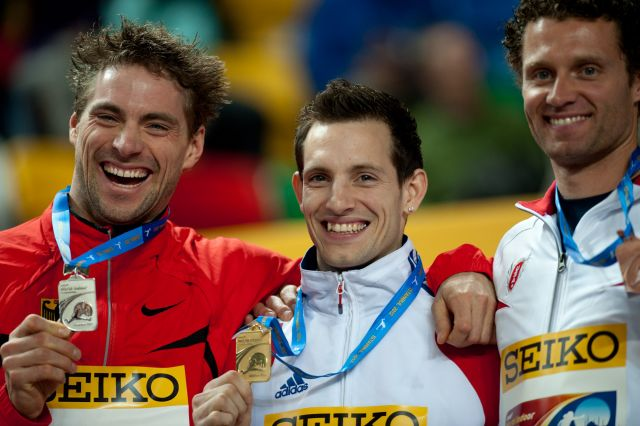
The winners in the pole vault (from left) Björn Otto, Renaud Lavillenie and Brad Walker.

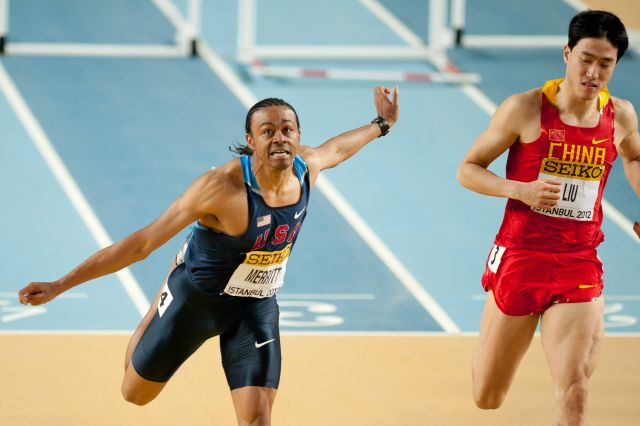
Aries Merritt en route to victory in the 60 metres hurdles.

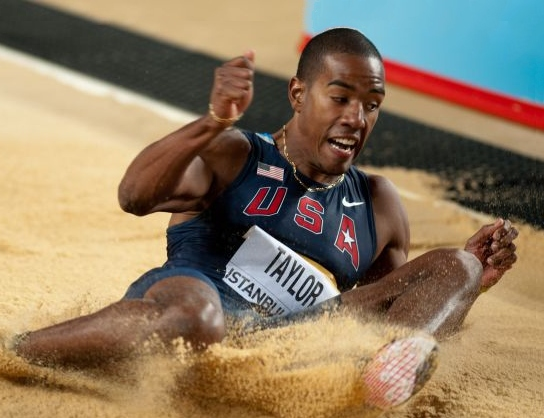
Silver medalist in the triple jump Christian Taylor.

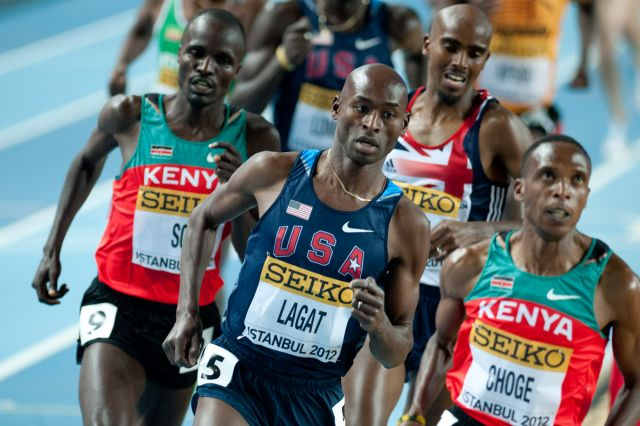
Bernard Lagat en route to victory in the 3000 metres.

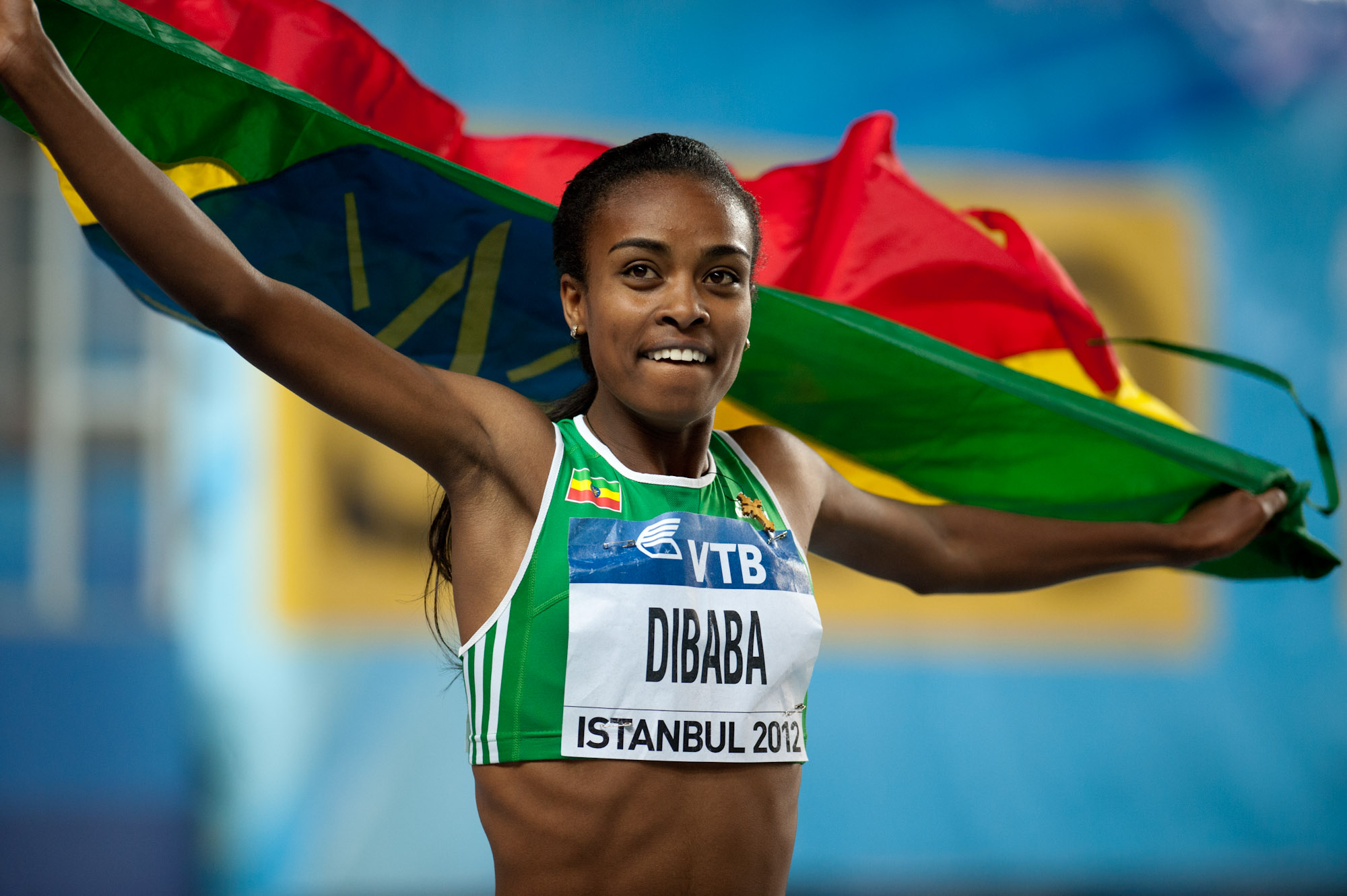
Genzebe Dibaba celebrating her win after the 1500 metres.

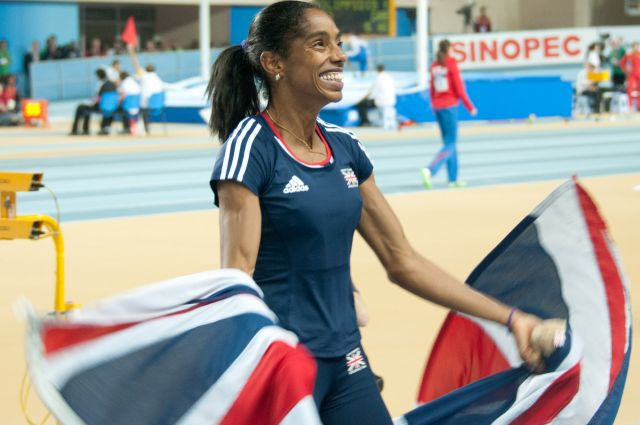
Yamilé Aldama celebrating her win after the triple jump.

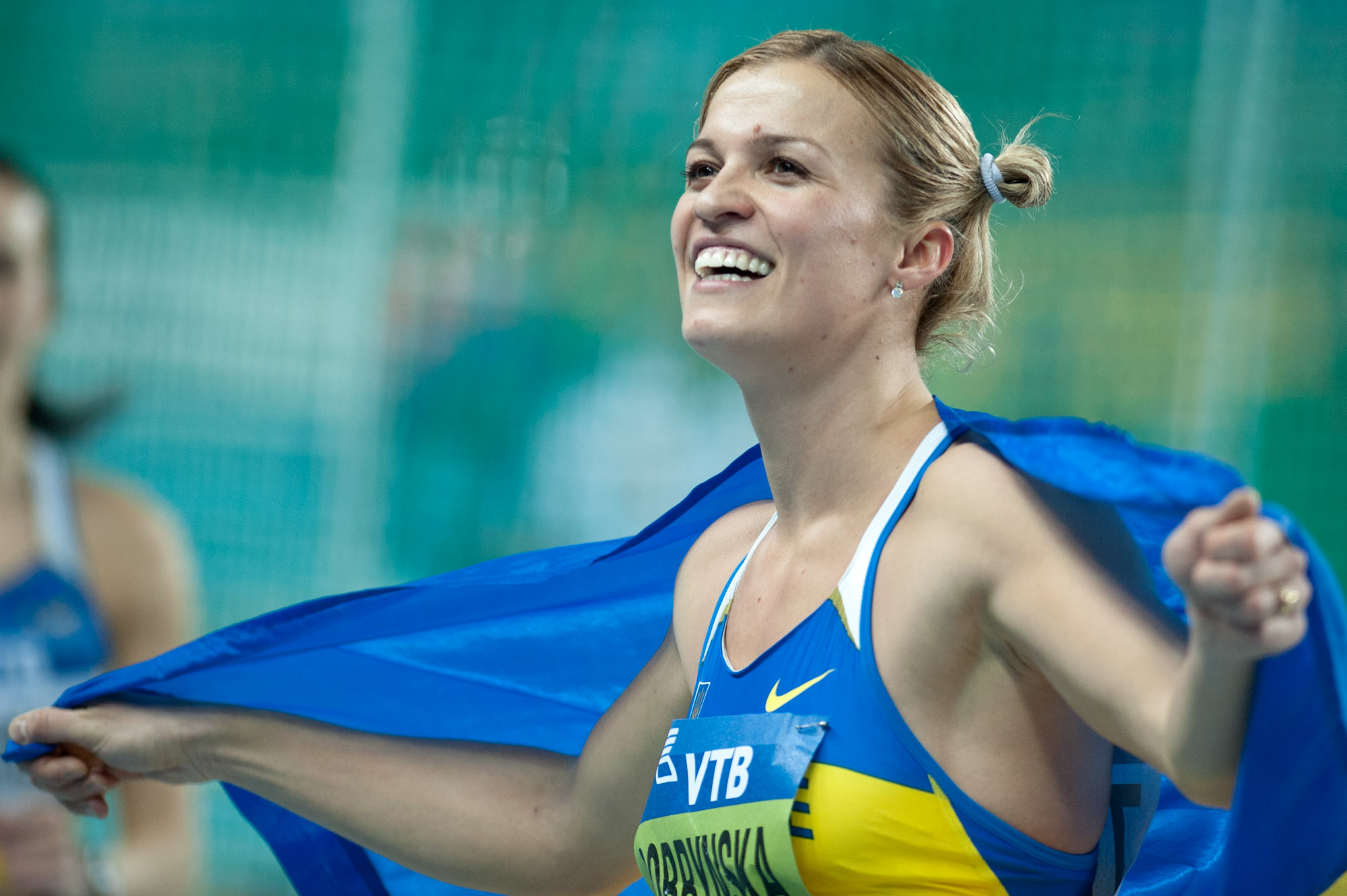
Nataliya Dobrynska celebrating her win after the pentathlon.

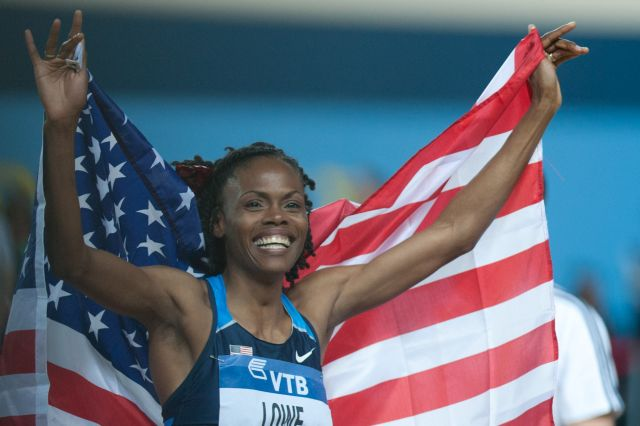
Chaunté Lowe celebrating her win after the high jump.

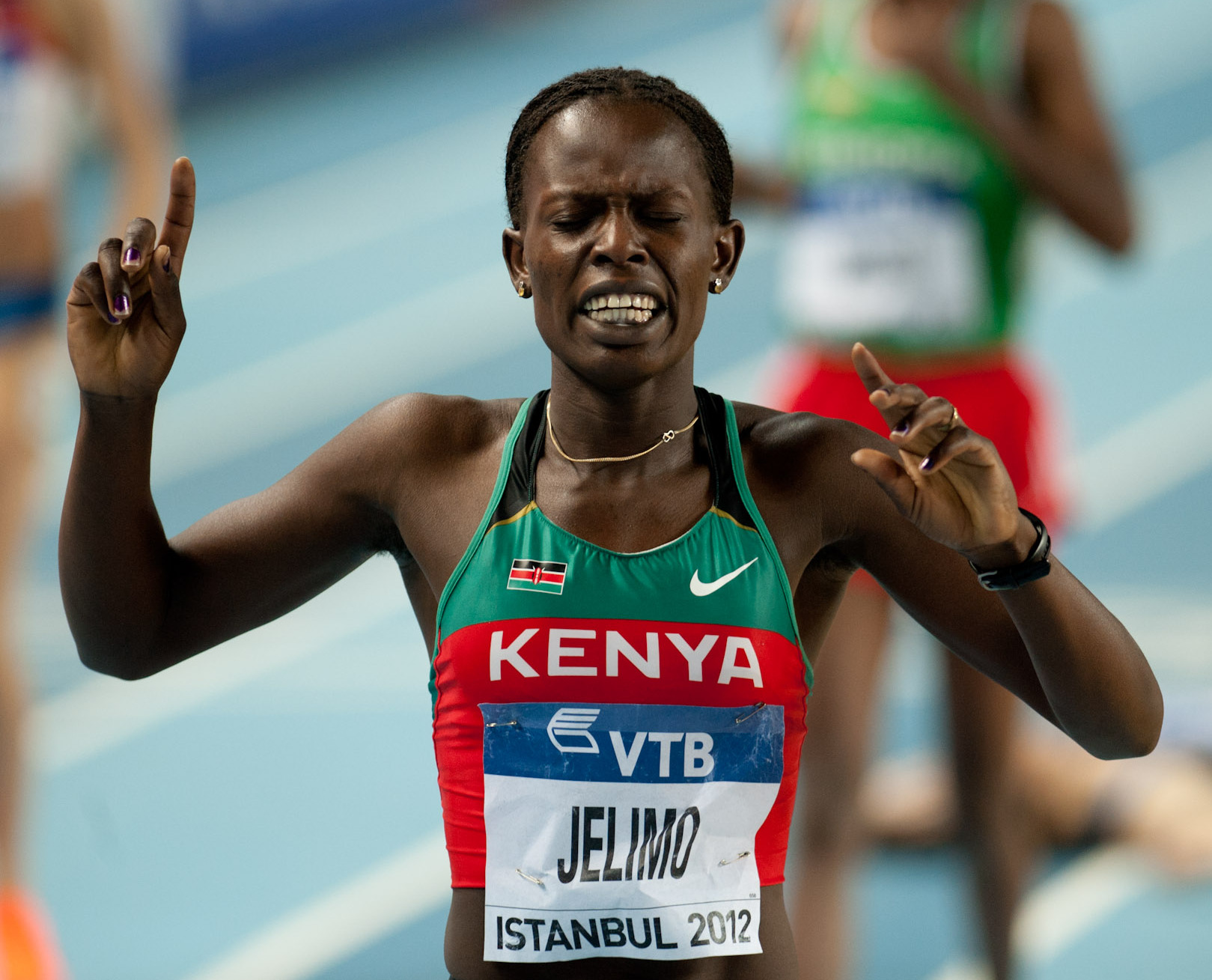
Pamela Jelimo celebrating her win after finishing the 800 metres.

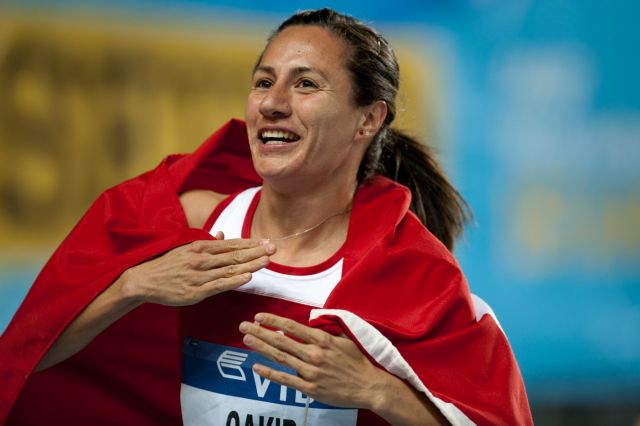
Aslı Çakır Alptekin celebrating her bronze medal performance in the 1500 metres.

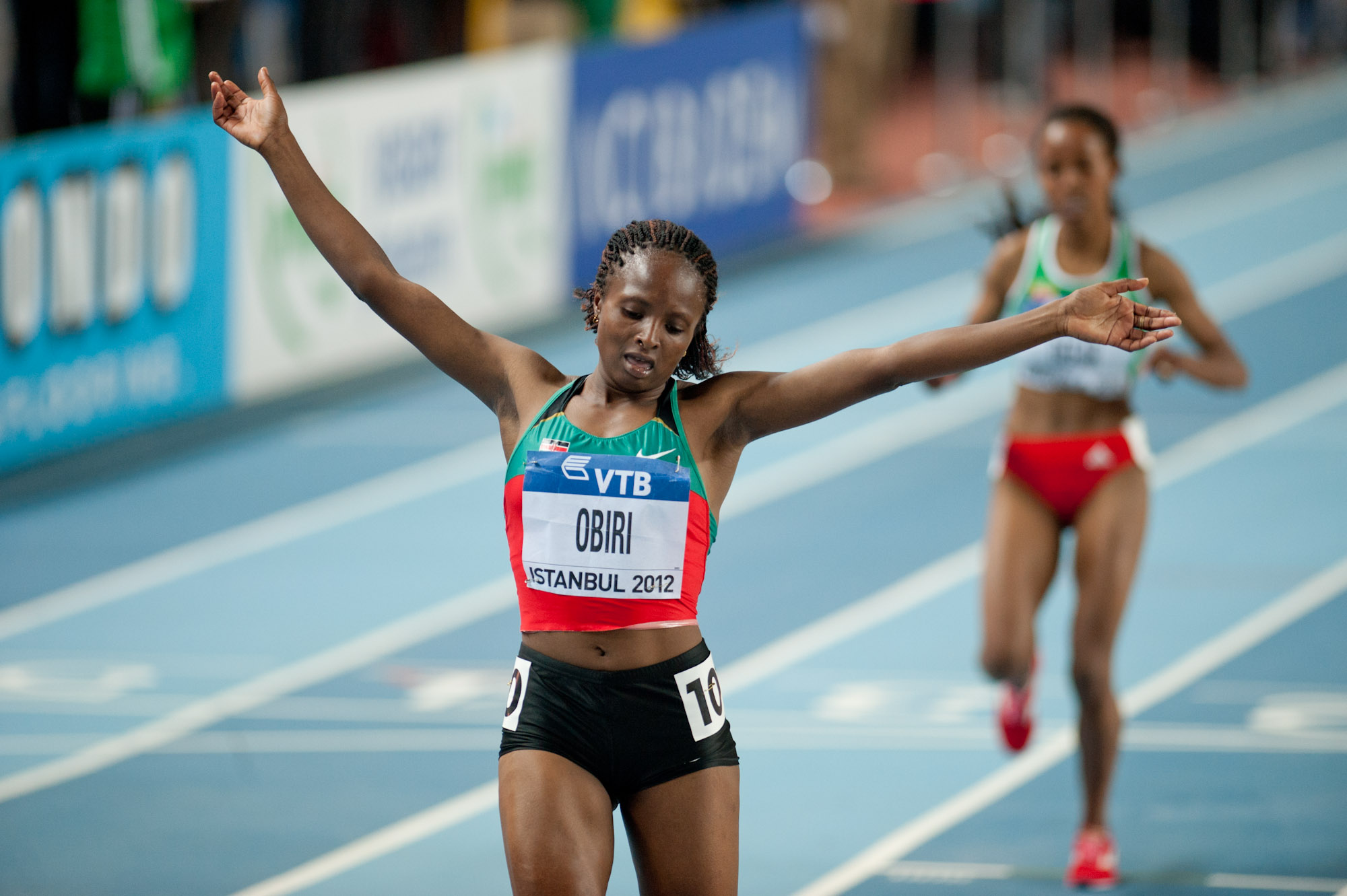
Hellen Onsando Obiri winning the 3000 metres.

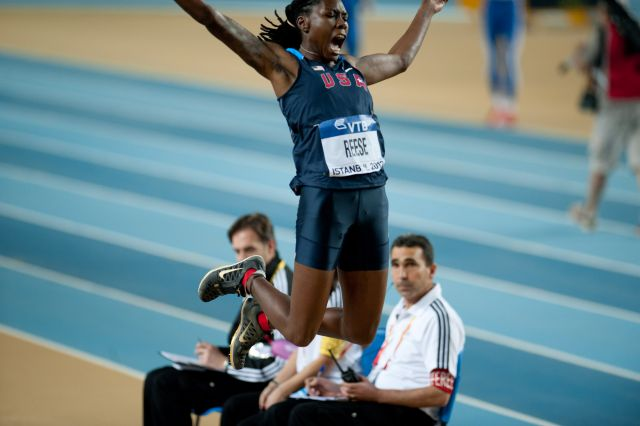
Gold medalist in the long jump Brittney Reese.

== Participating nations ==
- Afghanistan (1)
- Albania (2)
- Algeria (2)
- Andorra (2)
- Anguilla (2)
- Argentina (1)
- Armenia (2)
- Aruba (1)
- Australia (6)
- Austria (3)
- Azerbaijan (2)
- Bahamas (6)
- Bahrain (4)
- Bangladesh (2)
- Belarus (17)
- Belgium (3)
- Benin (2)
- Bermuda (1)
- Bosnia and Herzegovina (2)
- Botswana (4)
- Brazil (7)
- British Virgin Islands (1)
- Brunei (2)
- Bulgaria (8)
- Burkina Faso (1)
- Cambodia (1)
- Cameroon (2)
- Canada (4)
- Cayman Islands (1)
- Chad (1)
- China (13)
- Chinese Taipei (2)
- Colombia (1)
- Comoros (2)
- Cook Islands (1)
- Costa Rica (1)
- Croatia (1)
- Cuba (10)
- Cyprus (2)
- Czech Republic (13)
- Democratic Republic of the Congo (1)
- Denmark (2)
- Djibouti (1)
- Dominica (1)
- Dominican Republic (1)
- Ecuador (1)
- Egypt (1)
- Equatorial Guinea (1)
- Estonia (2)
- Ethiopia (10)
- Federated States of Micronesia (1)
- Fiji (2)
- France (11)
- French Polynesia (2)
- Gambia (1)
- Georgia (2)
- Germany (17)
- Ghana (3)
- Gibraltar (1)
- Great Britain (30)
- Greece (7)
- Grenada (1)
- Guam (2)
- Guinea (1)
- Guinea-Bissau (2)
- Guyana (2)
- Haiti (1)
- Hong Kong (2)
- Hungary (3)
- Iceland (2)
- India (1)
- Indonesia (1)
- Iran (3)
- Iraq (2)
- Ireland (3)
- Israel (2)
- Italy (14)
- Ivory Coast (2)
- Jamaica (10)
- Japan (1)
- Kazakhstan (6)
- Kenya (9)
- Kiribati (2)
- Kuwait (1)
- Kyrgyzstan (2)
- Latvia (2)
- Lebanon (1)
- Lesotho (1)
- Lithuania (5)
- Macau (1)
- Macedonia (1)
- Madagascar (1)
- Malawi (1)
- Maldives (1)
- Mali (1)
- Malta (1)
- Marshall Islands (1)
- Mauritania (1)
- Mauritius (2)
- Mexico (1)
- Moldova (2)
- Monaco (1)
- Mongolia (2)
- Morocco (6)
- Namibia (1)
- Nauru (2)
- Netherlands (4)
- New Zealand (1)
- Nicaragua (1)
- Nigeria (4)
- Norfolk Island (1)
- Northern Mariana Islands (1)
- Norway (1)
- Oman (1)
- Pakistan (2)
- Palau (2)
- Palestine (2)
- Panama (1)
- Papua New Guinea (2)
- Paraguay (1)
- Peru (1)
- Philippines (1)
- Poland (13)
- Portugal (2)
- Puerto Rico (1)
- Qatar (3)
- Republic of the Congo (1)
- Romania (13)
- Russia (42)
- Rwanda (2)
- Saint Kitts and Nevis (2)
- Saint Lucia (1)
- Saint Vincent and the Grenadines (2)
- El Salvador (1)
- Samoa (1)
- San Marino (2)
- Saudi Arabia (1)
- Senegal (1)
- Serbia (1)
- Seychelles (1)
- Sierra Leone (1)
- Singapore (2)
- Slovakia (1)
- Slovenia (4)
- Solomon Islands (2)
- South Africa (3)
- South Korea (1)
- Spain (20)
- Sudan (2)
- Swaziland (1)
- Sweden (4)
- Switzerland (2)
- Syria (2)
- Tajikistan (2)
- Tanzania (1)
- Thailand (1)
- Tonga (2)
- Trinidad and Tobago (7)
- Turkey (16)
- Turkmenistan (1)
- Tuvalu (1)
- Uganda (2)
- Ukraine (25)
- United Arab Emirates (2)
- United States (46)
- United States Virgin Islands (2)
- Uruguay (2)
- Uzbekistan (5)
- Vanuatu (2)
- Venezuela (4)
- Zambia (2)
