= Cassandra Tate =

American athlete (born 1990)

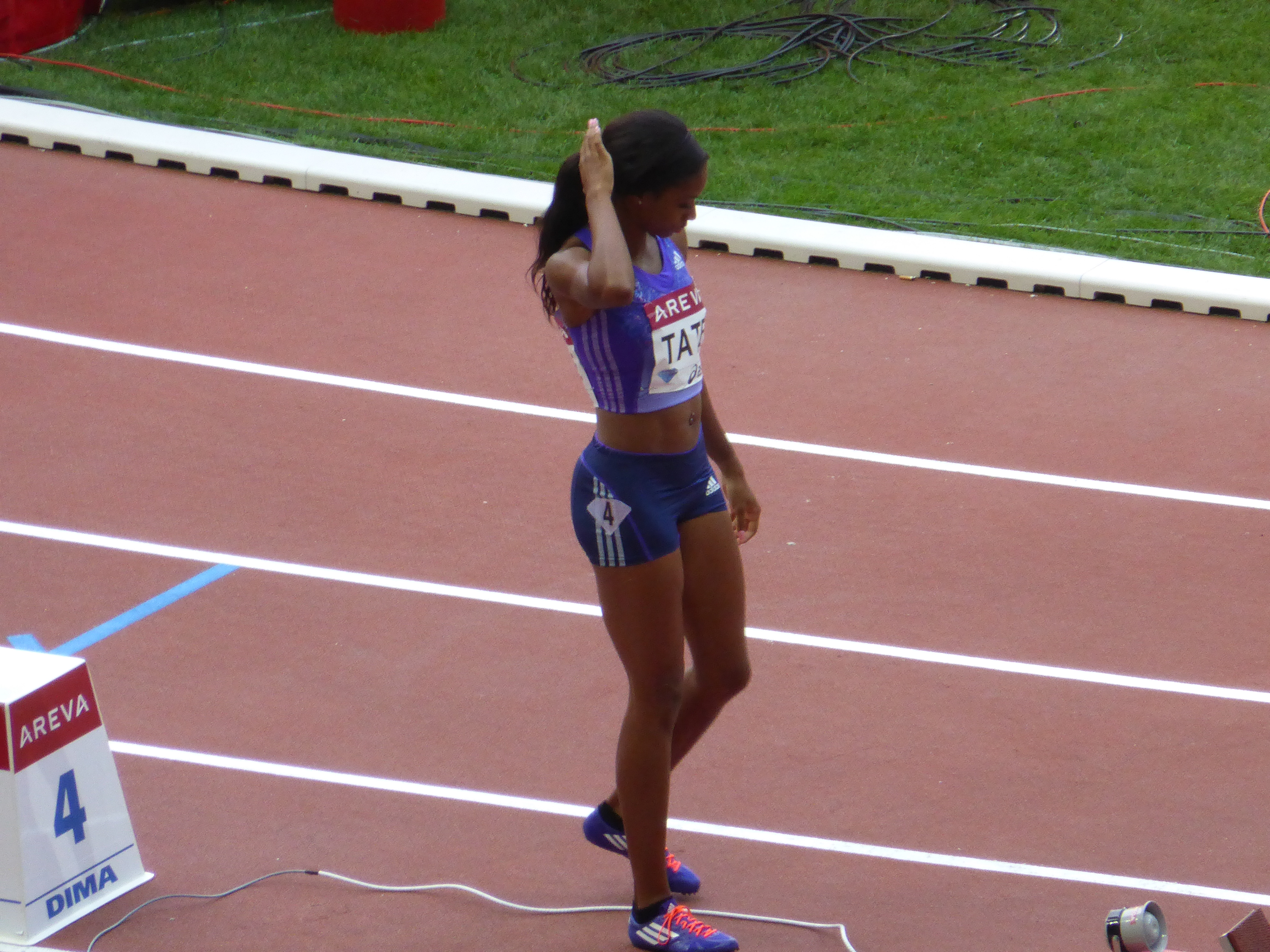
- Cassandra Tate in 2015

Personal information
- Nationality: American
- Born: September 11, 1990 (age 36)

Sport
- Country: United States
- Sport: Track and field
- Event: 400 metres hurdles
Medal record
World Championships
Bronze medal – third place	2015 Beijing	400 m hurdles

Cassandra Tate (born September 11, 1990) is an American track and field athlete specializing in the 400 meters hurdles. She won the bronze medal at the 2015 World Championships in Beijing.

Running for the LSU Lady Tigers track and field team, Tate won the 2012 400 meter hurdles at the NCAA Division I Outdoor Track and Field Championships.

== Statistics ==
=== International competitions ===
Year	Competition	Venue	Position	Event	Notes
Representing the United States
2012	NACAC U23 Championships	Irapuato, Mexico	1st	200 m	55.62
2012	NACAC U23 Championships	Irapuato, Mexico	1st	4 × 400 m relay	3:28.64
2014	World Indoor Championships	Sopot, Poland	1st	4 × 400 m relay	3:24.83
2015	World Championships	Beijing, China	3rd	400 m hurdles	54.02
2017	World Championships	London, United Kingdom	7th	400 m hurdles	55.43
2022	NACAC Championships	Freeport, Bahamas	3rd	400 m hurdles	55.62

=== Circuit performances ===
Grand Slam Track results
Slam	Race group	Event	Pl.	Time	Prize money
2025 Kingston Slam	Long hurdles	400 m hurdles	7th	56.65	US$12,500
2025 Kingston Slam	Long hurdles	400 m	6th	52.73	US$12,500
2025 Miami Slam	Long hurdles	400 m hurdles	6th	55.94	US$10,000
2025 Miami Slam	Long hurdles	400 m	8th	53.55	US$10,000

=== Personal bests ===
Outdoor

- 400 meters – 52.51 (Baton Rouge 2015)
- 400 meters hurdles – 54.01 (Eugene 2015)

Indoor

- 400 meters – 52.40 (Albuquerque 2014)
