= Joanna Atkins =

American sprinter

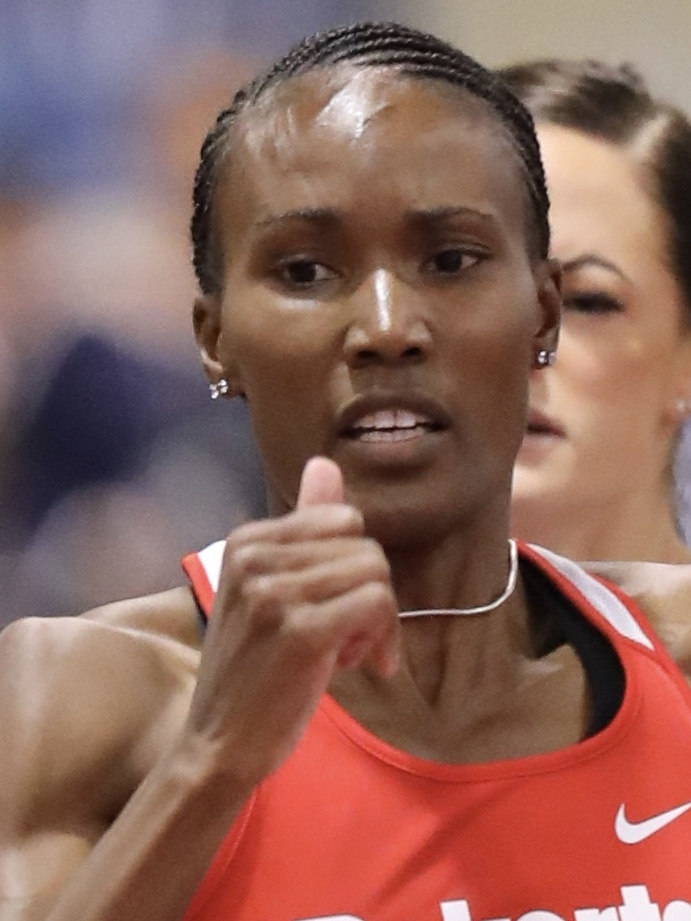
- Joanna Atkins at the 2018 USA Indoor Track and Field Championships.

Personal information
- Born: January 31, 1989 (age 37) Dallas, United States
- Height: 5 ft 11 in (180 cm)
- Weight: 144 lb (65 kg)

Sport
- College team: Auburn University
- Coached by: Derrick White

Achievements and titles
- Personal bests: 100 m: 10.99 s (Oregon 2016); 200 m: 22.27 s (Florida 2014); 400 m: 50.39 s (2009)
Medal record
Women's athletics
Representing the United States
World Outdoor Championships
Gold medal – first place	2013 Moscow	4 × 400 m relay
World Indoor Championships
Gold medal – first place	2014 Sopot	4 × 400 m relay
Gold medal – first place	2018 Birmingham	4 × 400 m relay
World Relay Championships
Gold medal – first place	2014 Nassau	4 × 400 m relay
Gold medal – first place	2019 Yokohama	4 × 400 m relay

Joanna Atkins (born January 31, 1989) is an American sprinter and American Record Holder who specializes in the 400 meter dash. She attended Stephenson High School in Stone Mountain, GA.

== College career ==
Atkins ran track for the Auburn Tigers under coach Henry Rolle where in 2009 she took first place at the NCAA Women's Division I Outdoor Track and Field Championships in the 400 meter dash and was Southeastern Conference champion in the same event.

== International career ==
At the 2013 USA Outdoor Track and Field Championships Atkins finished in 4th place. This finish assured her a spot as a team member of the 4 × 400 meter relay at the 2013 World Championships in Athletics.
